= Khoi =

Khoi may refer to:

== People ==
- The Khoekhoe people of South Africa
  - The Khoekhoe language

== Places ==
- Khoy, a city in Iran
  - Khoy County, an administrative subdivision of Iran

== Other uses ==
- Streblus asper, native name khoi
  - Khoi paper, a Southeast Asian paper made from khoi
- KHOI (FM), a radio station (89.1 FM) licensed to serve Story City, Iowa, United States

== See also ==
- KOI (disambiguation)
- Kois, surname
- Koi (disambiguation)
- Koy (disambiguation)
- Coi (disambiguation)
- Coy (disambiguation)
