= Nancy Kelsey =

First white woman to travel overland from Missouri

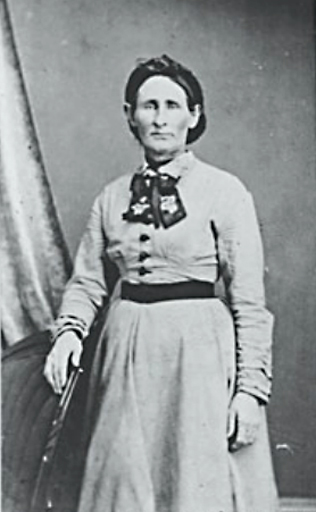
- Nancy Kelsey photographed by Carleton E. Watkins
- Born: Nancy Roberts; August 1, 1823; Barren County, Kentucky, U.S.
- Died: August 10, 1896 (aged 73); Cuyama, California, U.S.
- Occupation: California pioneer
- Known for: 1st white woman to overland from Missouri to California

Nancy Kelsey (August 1, 1823, in Barren County, Kentucky – August 10, 1896, in Cuyama, California) was a member of the Bartleson–Bidwell Party. She was the first white woman to travel overland from Missouri, seeing Utah and Nevada before crossing the Sierra Nevada mountains into California on November 25, 1841. Wife of Benjamin Kelsey, and the mother of eight surviving children, she is sometimes referred to as the "Betsy Ross of California" for her role in creation of the original Bear Flag from which Bear Flag Rebellion got its name.

== Personal life ==
Born in Barren County, Kentucky, her family moved to Jackson County, Missouri, when she was three years old.

Nancy married Benjamin "Ben" Kelsey on October 25, 1838, in Henry County, Missouri. Her husband and his brothers, David, Samuel and Andrew had settled a section in the Hoffman Bend area of what would become St. Clair County, Missouri, and had already been in some trouble with the authorities. There were some shady dealings in real estate; Samuel was indicted for murder, and a lawsuit was filed against Andrew in 1841. After his brothers left for the west, David remained behind as David Kelso in Missouri, taking care of their elderly father, Samuel Kelsey Sr.

== Overland to California ==
Nancy Kelsey was 17 years old in 1841 when Ben decided to travel west after reading doctor John Marsh's letter extolling the California climate and crop-growing advantages. As early as 1837, Marsh realized that owning a great rancho was problematic if he could not hold it. The corrupt and unpredictable rulings by courts in California (then part of Mexico) made this questionable. With evidence that the Russians, French and English were preparing to seize the province, he determined to make it a part of the United States. He felt that the best way to go about this was to encourage emigration by Americans to California, and in this way the history of Texas would be repeated.

Marsh conducted a letter-writing campaign espousing the California climate, soil and other reasons to settle there, as well as the best route to follow, which became known as "Marsh's route." His letters were read, reread, passed around, and printed in newspapers throughout the country, and started the first significant immigration to California. He invited immigrants to stay on his ranch until they could get settled, and assisted in their obtaining passports.

Before they left Missouri, Nancy Kelsey's second child, named after his uncle Samuel, died after only eight days. Shortly thereafter on May 18, 1841, Ben and Nancy with their one-year-old daughter, Martha Ann, and Kelsey's brothers joined John Bidwell as members of the first wagon train to California. The group had at least one wedding on the trail. Father Pierre-Jean De Smet performed the ceremony for Nancy Kelsey's sister "Betsey Grey" and her new husband Richard Phelan before the two emigrant groups and the priest's parties split up in August 1841.

One emigrant group, including some of the Kelsey family as well as Nancy's sister and new husband, went directly to Oregon. The other group—including Nancy, Martha Ann and Ben Kelsey—took the route detailed in Marsh's letter, which Marsh had never seen, through Utah and Nevada.

Many years later, an interview with Nancy Kelsey was published in the San Francisco Examiner where she recollected the trip across the continent; she said the group had no guide and no compass. Nancy Kelsey was the first white woman to see the Great Salt Lake in Utah. The emigrants had been told to not go too far south or north of the lake, but to strike westward from it. On September 16, the wagons and most of their contents were left on the west face of Nevada's Ruby Mountains, near Owens Lake and the present day Oasis, Nevada.

After abandoning the wagons, the party proceeded on foot with pack horses. The party was attacked several times, witnessed the fatal remains of other ambushes, and had their provisions and horses stolen. Nancy was quoted:

We left our wagons and finished our journey on horse-back and drove our cattle. I carried my baby in front of me on the horse. At one place the Indians surrounded us, armed with their bows and arrows, but my husband leveled his gun at the chief and made him order his Indians out of arrow range.

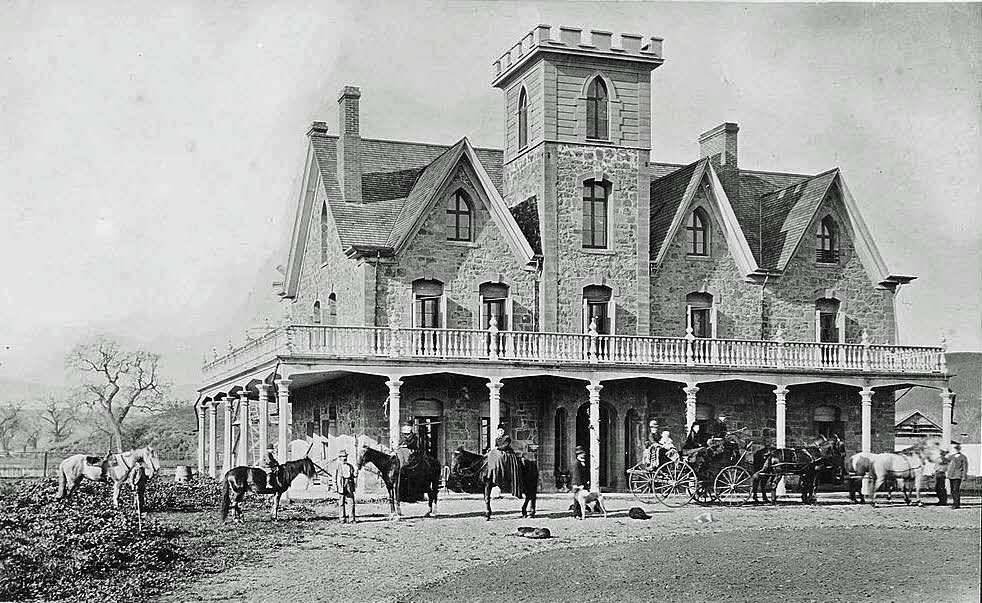
The Bartleson-Bidwell Party ended its journey at the ranch of Dr. John Marsh (at his invitation) near Brentwood, California. Marsh's stone house still stands, and is now part of Marsh Creek State Park.

On September 24, they found the Mary's River that was in Marsh's description; now called the Humboldt River, it ends in the Humboldt Sink, an intermittent dry lake bed and by October 15, they were at the base of the Sierra Nevada mountain range. The 34 members of the party arrived in California via the Sonora Pass and followed the Stanislaus River down hill. They reached the confluence with the San Joaquin River on November 3, and several members of the group, including the Kelsey's, stopped at Doctor Marsh's ranch at the foot of Mount Diablo on November 4, 1841. The Kelseys stayed a month with Marsh before proceeding to Sutter's Fort. Subsequently, several of the group wrote of Nancy's patience, heroism and kindness on the journey. She is credited with being the first white woman to see Utah, Nevada, the first to cross the Sierra Nevada and the first to travel overland from Missouri to California.

== Life in the west ==
During 1842, Nancy and Ben Kelsey worked for John Sutter collecting elk hides at Clear Lake, California. In 1843, while she was pregnant, they left Sutter's employ and drove cattle north along the California–Oregon Trail east of Mount Shasta, past Klamath Lake, and on to Oregon City. Along the way, they were attacked nearly constantly by Native Americans, one of whom was shot dead very close to Nancy. While in Oregon, Nancy delivered Sarah Jane Kelsey, who died after eight days. Nancy became pregnant almost immediately and delivered daughter Margaret September 14, 1843, in Oregon. After selling their cattle, the family loaded up with goods and returned to California where they settled on 2,000 acres (810 ha) at Calistoga, neighboring General Vallejo's property to the south. Ben's brothers Isaac and Samuel with their families arrived in northern California at the end of 1843; they had started with the Bidwell party but branched off for Oregon. David Kelsey arrived separately, but died in 1845 of smallpox.

In 1844 the Kelsey home about 1 mile (1.6 km) south of Calistoga was attacked by Native Americans. Nancy Kelsey rolled her daughter into a blanket; both survived. While tensions were growing in the spring of 1846, Nancy delivered son Andrew Kelsey on April 7, bringing the total of living children to three.

=== Bear Flag Rebellion ===
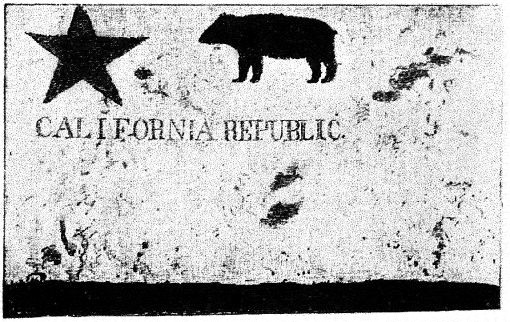
The original Bear Flag, designed by William L. Todd, sewn by Nancy Kelsey, Mrs. John Sears and Mrs. Benjamin Dewell. It was lost to fire in the 1906 San Francisco earthquake.

During the Bear Flag Rebellion in 1846, while the Kelsey brothers joined John C. Fremont in declaring California's independence from Mexico, Nancy Kelsey, Mrs. John Sears, and Mrs. Benjamin Dewell sewed the original "Bear Flag" from a pattern drawn by William L. Todd, a nephew of Mary Todd Lincoln. Nancy Kelsey has been referred to as the "Betsy Ross of California" for her contributions to the flag, after which the Bear Flag Rebellion was named. The words "California Republic" were inked in pokeberry juice, the fabrics borrowed from the little available and many said the bear looked more like a pig but it only had to serve for twenty-four days from June 14, 1846, until the U.S. Navy claimed California for the U.S. and raised an American flag at Monterey. On June 28, 1846, Fremont and Ben Kelsey became enemies when Kelsey refused to kill José de los Reyes Berreyesa, a Mexican neighbor and the twin sons of Francisco de Haro; they were killed by Kit Carson.

=== The Sonoma Gang ===
In 1848, Nancy delivered Mary Ellen Kelsey on June 26 at Sutter's Fort. Ben left Nancy and the four children behind when he took fifty Pomo men from his brother Andrew's ranch southwest of present-day Kelseyville, on Rancho Lupyomi at the American River, in the Sierra foothills to mine for gold. They established a mining camp called Kelsey Diggings in the Sierra foothills near Sutter's Mill.

Once at the diggings, he sold all the company's supplies to other miners and returned home to Sonoma, ill with malaria, but with a $16,000 profit. At this time, while still sick, he shot a Native American dead for "accosting" Nancy who had ridden from home to town to get him medicine. Only one or two of their abandoned Pomo workers survived in hostile territory, suffering from starvation and malaria. Andrew Kelsey and another partner, surnamed Stone, had forced the wife of one of their workers into concubinage and sent her husband off to live with Nancy and Ben Kelsey. When the mistreated husband returned to his people, he was tortured. Shortly thereafter, Stone and Andrew Kelsey were killed, but the details are highly variable among sources. This event provoked the Bloody Island Massacre, although the 60–100 Pomo Indians who were killed on Bloody Island by the U.S. Army and volunteers were not the ones responsible for the deaths of Stone and Kelsey.

Seeking revenge, Ben Kelsey and a group of vigilantes called "The Sonoma Gang" murdered "dozens of innocent Native Americans in Napa and Sonoma counties" in retribution for Andrew's murder. Seven of the vigilantes—but not Ben Kelsey—were captured and charged with murder, but bailed for $10,000 in the first-ever decision by the Supreme Court of California. Abandoning their bail, at least three of the seven sailed for Humboldt Bay aboard the schooner Ryerson.

=== Northwestern California ===
In April 1850, the Union Company was formed by 33 members—including survivors of the Josiah Gregg expedition to Humboldt Bay—with the goal of finding and settling lands around Humboldt Bay to supply the inland mines. Of the 33, ten were part of the Sonoma Gang, including Ben Kelsey.

In September 1850, Ben and his brother Samuel came to Humboldt County, California, rejoining the other members of the Union Company, including five of the seven released members of the Sonoma Gang. Ben had killed a Native American chief on their overland trip to Humboldt Bay and his reputation got to town before they did, a Eureka correspondent wrote: "Kelsey of Sonoma (the Indian killer) is on his way here with his own and several other families." Nancy and Ben built a fancy house at the northwest corner of the Arcata Plaza, at 9th and H streets. The Kelsey men burned two Wiyot villages and killed several Native Americans. They were in northwestern California about twenty-two months during which time Kelsey's brothers had injured and killed natives and caused harm to intercultural relationships that would lead to the 1860 Wiyot Massacre, while Ben opened up wagon trails to the mining areas from Crescent City, California. The Kelsey National Recreation trail follows 8 miles (13 km) of the route between Scott River Road and Paradise Lake.

Nancy delivered Nancy Rose on February 14, 1851, in Sonoma at about the same time as Ben Kelsey became sick with tuberculosis. They lost their fancy house in Arcata to foreclosure after which Ben, Nancy and the four children moved around a lot through Sacramento and San Joaquin to Mariposa for two months, then lived for eight months in San Jose. On March 18, 1855, Nancy delivered Georgia Ann. The family lived in Oakland for one year, moved to Gilroy for fourteen months, and moved again to the Kern River mines where Kelsey mined and operated a toll bridge for 18 months. From there, the family moved to Four Creeks for two years and finally to Mexico in late 1859 after Nancy delivered her last child, William Wallus Kelsey, on October 22 in Arizona, bringing the family to eight surviving children (out of 10 pregnancies), six girls and two boys.

=== Surviving the Comanches ===
Seeking drier weather for her husband, the family moved to Mexico in 1859, and then to Texas in 1861 where Nancy, Martha Ann and two younger daughters survived an attack by Comanche. Nancy loaded guns and told the children to hide. Her two oldest girls hid, but 12-year-old Mary Ellen was captured and found the next day scalped, stabbed and with a fractured skull which she survived but suffered mental illness until her death six years later

=== Final moves ===
In 1864, the family returned to California, at first in San Luis Obispo, then settling near Fresno in 1865. The wandering continued; the family moved to Inyo County, survived the 1872 Lone Pine earthquake, which Ben said was the only thing that ever frightened him. Ben worked in the Cerro Gordo Mines, and finally the family moved to Los Angeles where Ben Kelsey died on February 19, 1889, aged 76.

Nancy Kelsey outlived her husband and spent her final years on farms in Santa Barbara County, California, where she was a midwife and an herbalist. Her vocabulary was described by one newspaperman as such that "would have given any genteel hostess the vapors." She told her interviewer of her eventful life "I have enjoyed riches and suffered the pangs of poverty. I have seen U.S. Grant when he was little known; I have baked bread for General Fremont and talked to Kit Carson. I have run from bear and killed most all other kinds of smaller game." She had borne eight surviving children, out of 10 pregnancies. while moving over much of the American west and in and out of Mexico. In 1937 the Native Daughters of the Golden West put a bronze plaque on Nancy Kelsey's grave at the head of Cottonwood Canyon in the Cuyama River Valley. On April 1, 1995, Oregon–California Trails Association placed a commemorative marker on her grave.
