= Koi (disambiguation) =

Koi are ornamental domesticated fish, commonly kept for decorative purposes in an outdoor pond.

Koi may also refer to:

== People ==
=== Given name ===
- Furuichi Kōi (古市公威; 1854–1934), Japanese civil engineer and university president
- Koi Larbi (born 1914), Ghanaian barrister and judge
- Koi Ikeno (born 1959), Japanese manga author and illustrator
- Koi Turnbull (born 1976), American comic book artist

=== Surname ===
- Gyula Koi (born 1977), Hungarian legal scholar and lecturer
- Koi Sie Yan (born 1999), Malaysian rhythmic gymnast

=== Title ===
- Kōi (后位), an ancient title for the Empress of Japan

== Places ==
- Koi, California, a Native American settlement in Lake County, California, United States
- Koi (Pakistan), a village in Kotli District, Pakistan

== Media ==
- Koi (magazine), a British journal on the hobby of keeping Koi
- "Koi" (song), a single by Gen Hoshino
- Koi (group), a Japanese comic book artist duo who wrote Is the Order a Rabbit?

== Other uses ==
- Gangetic koi or anabas cobojius, fish species native to Bangladesh and India
- Koi (dish), a Lao raw fish or raw meat salad
- Koi language
- koi, the ISO 639-3 identifier for the Komi-Permyak language
- Madam Koi Koi, a myth
- Kōi (皇位, "imperial seat"), native name for the Chrysanthemum Throne of Japan

== See also ==
- KOI (disambiguation)
- Kois, surname
- Khoi (disambiguation)
- Koy (disambiguation)
- Coi (disambiguation)
- Coy (disambiguation)
