= Coy (name) =

Coy is both a surname and a given name. Notable people with the name include:

Surname:

- Bernard Coy (1991), an American bank robber, famous for trying to escape from Alcatraz prison
- Bobby Coy, English former football player
- Eric Coy, Canadian Olympic discus thrower and shot putter
- John Coy, American children's book author
- Jeffrey Coy (1951–2018), American politician
- Jonathan Coy, British actor
- Juan Coy, Minister of State for Human Development in Belize
- Lynne Coy-Ogan, American academic administrator
- Megan Coy, American politician
- Michelle Coy, British bobsledder
- Randi Coy, participant in the reality show My Big Fat Obnoxious Fiance
- Steve Coy, English drummer, manager, producer, and songwriter for new wave band Dead or Alive
- Ted Coy, American college football player
- Wayne Coy, chairman of the Federal Communications Commission (1947–1952)

Given name:

- Coy Gibbs, former NASCAR car driver and National Football League (NFL) assistant coach
- Coy Bacon, former NFL player
- Coy Bowles, guitarist and keyboardist in Zac Brown Band
- Coy Cronk (born 1998), American football player
- Coy Wire, NFL player
- Coy Watson Jr., American child actor
- Coy Cook, American singer
- Coy "Luke" Perry, American actor
- Coy Privette, Baptist pastor and politician under the shadow of a scandal
- Coy Pugh (born 1952), American politician

Fictional characters:

- Coy Duke, fictional character on the TV show The Dukes of Hazzard

== See also ==
- Koy (name), given name and surname
