= Koy =

Koy or KOY may refer to:

- Koy (name), given name and surname
- Koy (animal), intermediate between cattle and beast
- KOY, commercial AM radio station in Phoenix, Arizona, U.S.
- Kingdom of Yugoslavia, state in Southeast and Central Europe from 1918 until 1941

== See also ==
- Coy (disambiguation)
- Koi (disambiguation)
- Köy, the word for "village" in several Western Oghuz languages
