= Site of First Adobe Home, Lake County =

Historical Landmark in Kelseyville, California, United States

Site of First Adobe Home in Lake County
- Location within California Location within the United States
- 38.978°N 122.843°W
- Location: Main Street & Bell Hill Road, Kelseyville, California

History
- Built: 1849

California Historical Landmark
- Designated: March 18, 1949
- Reference no.: 426

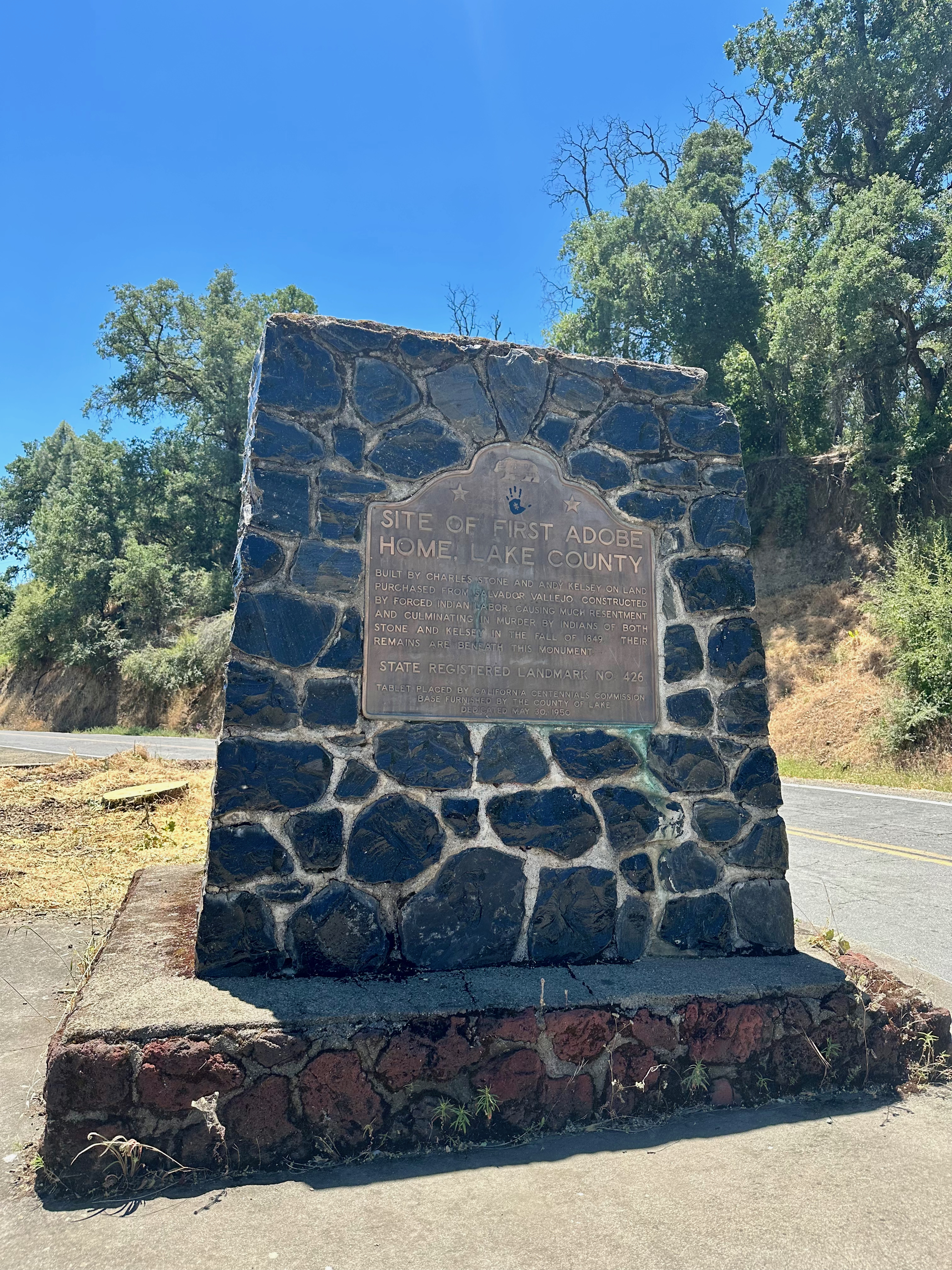
California Historical Landmark No. 426 in Kelseyville, the site of the adobe house Stone and Kelsey forced local Indians to build. Their remains are below the monument.

Site of First Adobe Home, Lake County is a historical landmark in Kelseyville, in Lake County, California.

In 1847, Californio Salvador Vallejo, General Mariano Guadalupe Vallejo's younger brother, sold his livestock and grazing rights in the Clear Lake area to Andrew and Benjamin Kelsey, Charles Stone and E.D. Shirland. Stone and Andrew Kelsey moved to the area and used Pomo and Wappo slave labor to build them a home, the first adobe house in the area. Pomo tribesmen were also forced by Ben Kelsey to work in gold mines in the Sierra foothills.

The Indians killed both Stone and Kelsey in the fall of 1849, due to the resentment of forced labor and other cruel acts.

In May 1850, the U.S. Cavalry killed hundreds of Pomo Indians on a Clear Lake island further north in the Bloody Island Massacre as retaliation.

The adobe house, which had been pillaged after Stone and Kelsey were killed, was eventually torn down by new settlers for materials to build chimneys and other buildings.

In May 1950, the remains of Stone and Kelsey, which had been reburied on a nearby hill, were exhumed and placed in a small wooden box, which several days later was buried beneath a newly erected monument. The historical landmark was unveiled on Memorial Day of the same year along four other markers as part as California's statehood's centennial celebrations.

The site of the house is California Historical Landmark No. 426.

== See also ==
- California Historical Landmarks in Lake County
- Andrew Kelsey
- Benjamin Kelsey
- Bloody Island Massacre
