= Koy (name) =

Koy is a given name and surname. Notable people with the name include:

== Given name ==
- Koy Banal, Filipino basketball coach
- Koy Detmer (born 1973), American football player

== Surname ==
- Ernie Koy (1909–2007), American baseball player
- Ernie Koy Jr. (born 1942), American football player
- Jo Koy (born 1971), American stand-up comic
- Ted Koy (born 1947), American football player

== See also ==
- Ah Koy, surname
- Coy (name), given name and surname
- Koi (disambiguation) § People, includes a list of people with the given name and surname Koi
