= Bartleson–Bidwell Party =

First American emigrants to succeed in wagon crossing from Missouri to California

In 1841, the Bartleson–Bidwell Party of thirty-two men and one woman, and her baby daughter, was led by Captain John Bartleson and John Bidwell. They became the first American emigrants to succeed in a wagon crossing from Missouri to California. Of the original 61 members, the only fatality was George Shotwell, who died from an accidental gunshot wound.

== Beginnings ==
In the winter of 1840, the Western Emigration Society was founded in Missouri, with a few dozen men, women and children ready to go to what they thought was a very prosperous utopia in Mexican California. Members included Baldridge, Barnett, Bartleson, Bidwell and Nye. Organized on 18 May 1841, Talbot H. Green was elected president, John Bidwell secretary, and John Bartleson captain. The group joined Father Pierre Jean De Smet's Jesuit missionary group, led by Thomas F. Fitzpatrick, westward across South Pass along the Oregon Trail. That trail took them past Courthouse and Jail Rocks, Chimney Rock, Scotts Bluff, Fort Laramie, and Independence Rock. The Bartleson-Bidwell party separated from Fitzpatrick, and the missionary group, at Soda Springs on 11 Aug.

== The Trail ==
The western Emigration Society had resolved to follow the route suggested by Dr. John Marsh. As early as 1837, Marsh realized that owning a great rancho was problematic if he could not hold it. The corrupt and unpredictable rulings by courts in California (then part of Mexico) made this questionable. With evidence that the Russians, French and English were preparing to seize the province, he determined to make it a part of the United States. He felt that the best way to go about this was to encourage emigration by Americans to California, and in this way the history of Texas would be repeated.

Marsh conducted a letter-writing campaign espousing the California climate, soil and other reasons to settle there, as well as the best route to follow, which became known as "Marsh's route." His letters were read, reread, passed around, and printed in newspapers throughout the country, and started the first significant immigration to California. He invited immigrants to stay on his ranch until they could get settled, and assisted in their obtaining passports.

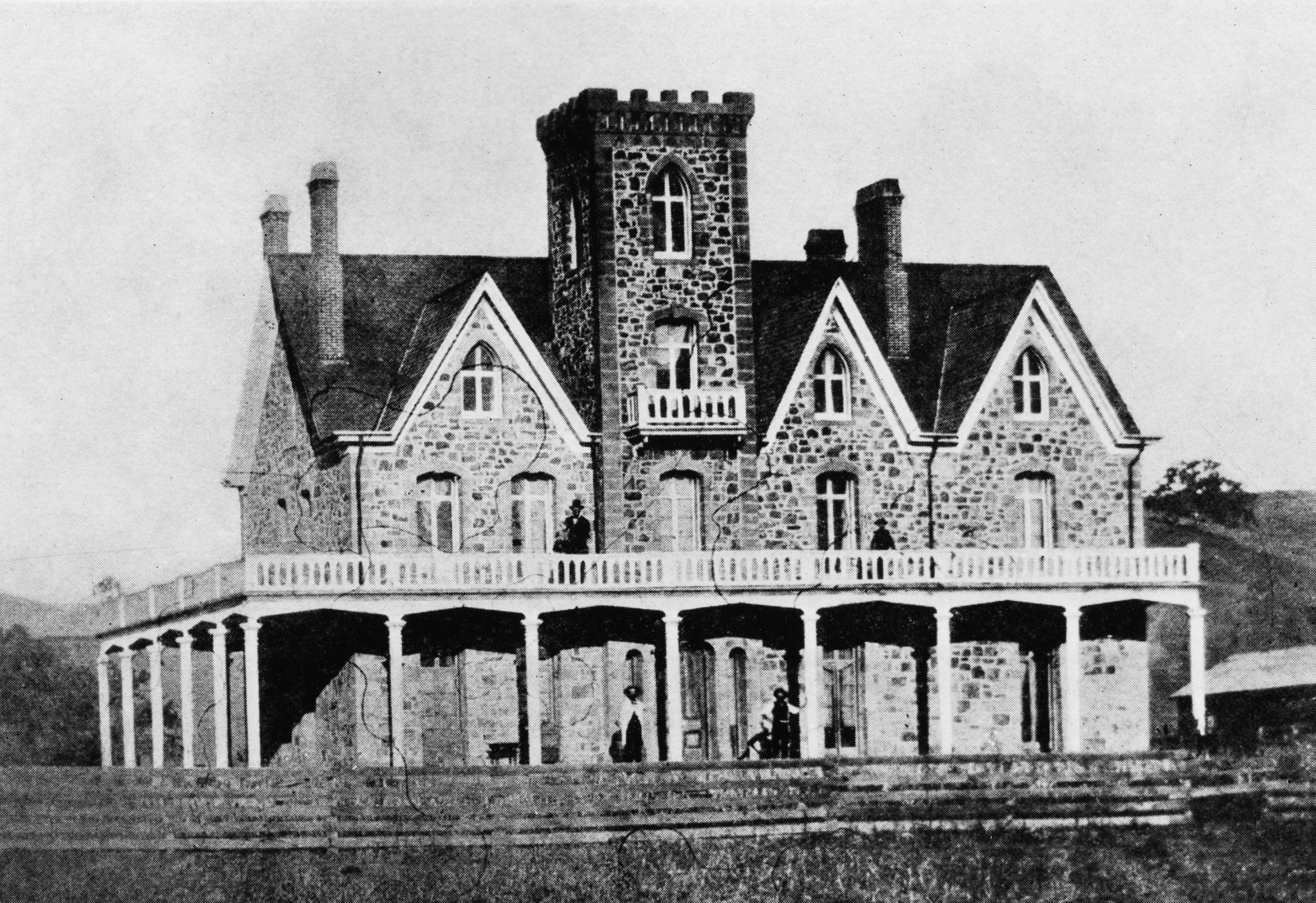
The Bartleson-Bidwell Party ended its journey at the ranch of John Marsh (at his invitation). He fed them, housed them and assisted in their getting settled. His house still stands, and is now part of Marsh Creek State Park.

Marsh's recommended route, the California Trail, was based on the prior experiences of Jedediah Smith, Peter Skene Ogden, and Joseph R. Walker. That route led southwest from Soda Springs along the Bear River and the Cache Valley. On August 24, 1841, the party headed west and north around the Great Salt Lake, camping in the vicinity of the Hansel Mountains until September 9 while they scouted the route to Mary's River (known today as the Humboldt River). By September 12 wagons and possessions were beginning to be abandoned. By October 9 they crossed Mary's River and headed west to Lake Humboldt, Humboldt Sink, and Carson Sink. On October 30 they passed through the Stanislaus River canyon into the San Joaquin Valley. On November 4, 1841, the 32 men, one woman and her baby daughter, made it to Marsh's ranch. They discovered a terrible drought was underway and living conditions were bad. Utopia it was not--and the Mexican government did not want them anywhere in California.

According to Doyce Nunis, "...the Bidwell-Bartleson party had successfully made the first planned overland emigrant journey to California, bearing with courage and great fortitude the vicissitudes of their ordeal. These hardy pioneers were the harbingers of many thousands to come."

== Roster ==
Missionary Party

- Captain: Thomas "Broken Hand" Fitzpatrick
- Jesuit Fathers: Pierre-Jean De Smet, Nicholas Point, Gregory Mengarini
- Jesuit Brothers: William Claessens, Charles Huet, Joseph Specht
- Teamsters: L. Boileau, E. Chaussie, L. L. Coving
- Trappers: Jim Baker, John Grey, William Mast, Piga
- Others: Amos E. Frye, Rogers, W.G. Romaine, Reverend Joseph Williams

The Bidwell-Bartleson who arrived in California

- John Bartleson
- Elias Barnett
- Josiah Belden
- William Belty
- John Bidwell
- Henry L. Brolaski
- David W. Chandler
- Joseph Chiles
- Grove C. Cook
- Nicholas Dawson
- V. W. Dawson
- Talbot H. Green
- George Henshaw
- Charles Hopper
- Henry Huber
- James John
- Thomas Jones
- Andrew Kelsey
- Benjamin Kelsey
- Nancy Kelsey and daughter
- John McDowell
- Nelson McMahan
- Samuel Green McMahan
- Michael C. Nye
- Andrew Gwinn Patton
- Robert Rickman
- John Roland
- John L. Schwartz
- James P. Springer
- Robert H. Thomas
- Ambrose Walton
- Major Walton
- Carl David Maria Weber

The Bidwell-Bartleson who arrived in Oregon

- Carroll
- Augustus Fifer
- Richard Fillan with wife and child
- William Fowler
- Charles W. Flügge
- David F. Hill
- J.W. Jones
- Samuel Kelsey with wife and five children
- Zedidiah Kelsey and wife
- Edward Rogers
- James Ross
- Richard Williams and wife

== See also ==
- Hastings Cutoff
