= Coy =

Coy or COY may refer to:

== Places ==
=== United States ===
- Coy, Arkansas, a town
- Coy, Alabama, an unincorporated community
- Coy, Missouri, an unincorporated community
- Coy Branch, Missouri, a stream

=== Elsewhere ===
- Coy Burn, Scotland, a stream
- Coy, Spain, a village
- Coolawanyah Station Airport, IATA airport code "COY"

== Other uses ==
- Coy (name), a list of people and a fictional character with the surname or given name
- Coy Cup, awarded to the Senior AA ice hockey champions of British Columbia
- COY, the ICAO designator for Coyne Airways, a British airline
- Abbreviation for company in the UK and some Commonwealth militaries

== See also ==
- Coy Site, Arkansas, United States, an archaeological site
- Coi (disambiguation)
- Koi, a type of ornamental domesticated fish
- Koi (disambiguation)
- McCoy (disambiguation)
