= Nathaniel Lyon =

U.S. army officer. First Union general to be killed in the American Civil War

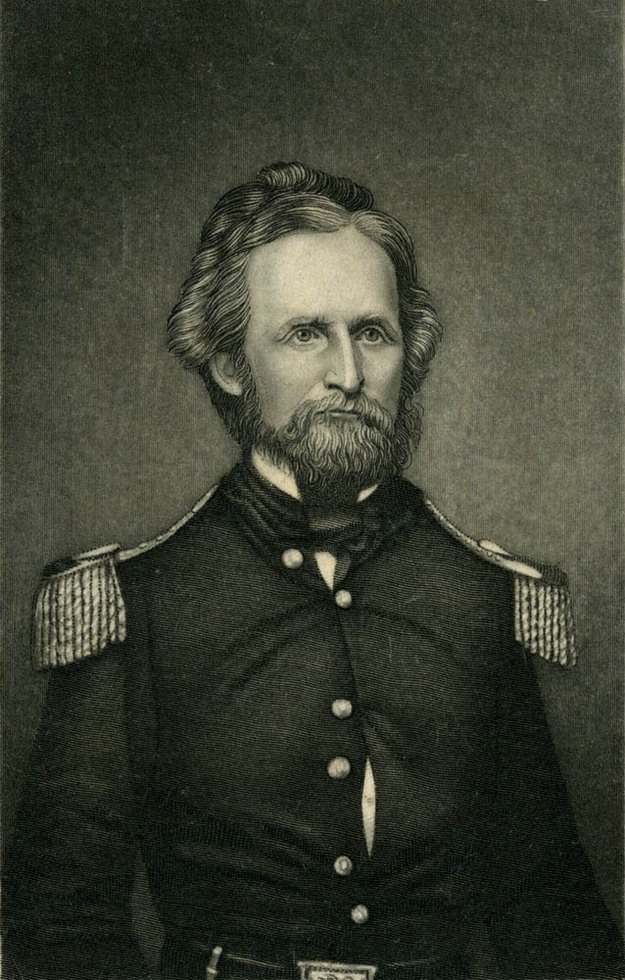
- Born: July 14, 1818; Ashford, Connecticut, U.S.
- Died: August 10, 1861 (aged 43); Battlefield, Missouri, U.S.
- Alma mater: United States Military Academy
- Military career
- Allegiance: United States
- Branch: United States Army
- Service years: 1841–1861
- Rank: Brigadier general
- Conflicts: Seminole Wars; Mexican–American War; Battle of Contreras; Battle of Churubusco; Battle of Mexico City; Bloody Island Massacre; Bleeding Kansas; American Civil War; Camp Jackson affair; Battle of Boonville; Battle of Wilson's Creek †

Signature
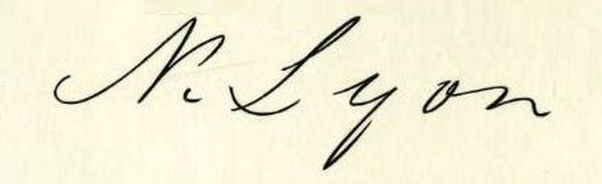

Nathaniel Lyon (July 14, 1818 – August 10, 1861) was a United States Army officer who was the first Union general to be killed in the American Civil War. He is noted for his actions in Missouri in 1861, at the beginning of the conflict, to forestall secret secessionist plans of the governor Claiborne Jackson.

He had fought in the Second Seminole War in Florida and the Mexican–American War. In 1850 he co-led the Bloody Island Massacre of 60–200 Pomo Native American old men, women, and children as part of the wider California genocide. Several days later, Lyon was responsible for another massacre in Cokadjal, killing 75 to 100 Native Americans, albeit the number was likely double.

After being assigned to Kansas, where many residents were divided about slavery and the Union, he developed strong pro-Union views. In February 1861, Lyon was made commander of the Union arsenal in St. Louis in Missouri, another divided state. Suspicious of governor Jackson, who was working with Jefferson Davis on a secret plan for secession, Lyon forced the surrender of the pro-Confederate militia.

Some civilians rioted and Lyon's troops fired into the crowd, which came to be known as the Camp Jackson Affair. Lyon was promoted brigadier-general and given command of Union troops in Missouri. He was killed at the Battle of Wilson's Creek, while trying to rally his outnumbered soldiers. Despite his death during the first year of the war, Lyon's efforts prevented the State of Missouri from joining the Confederacy.

== Early life and education ==
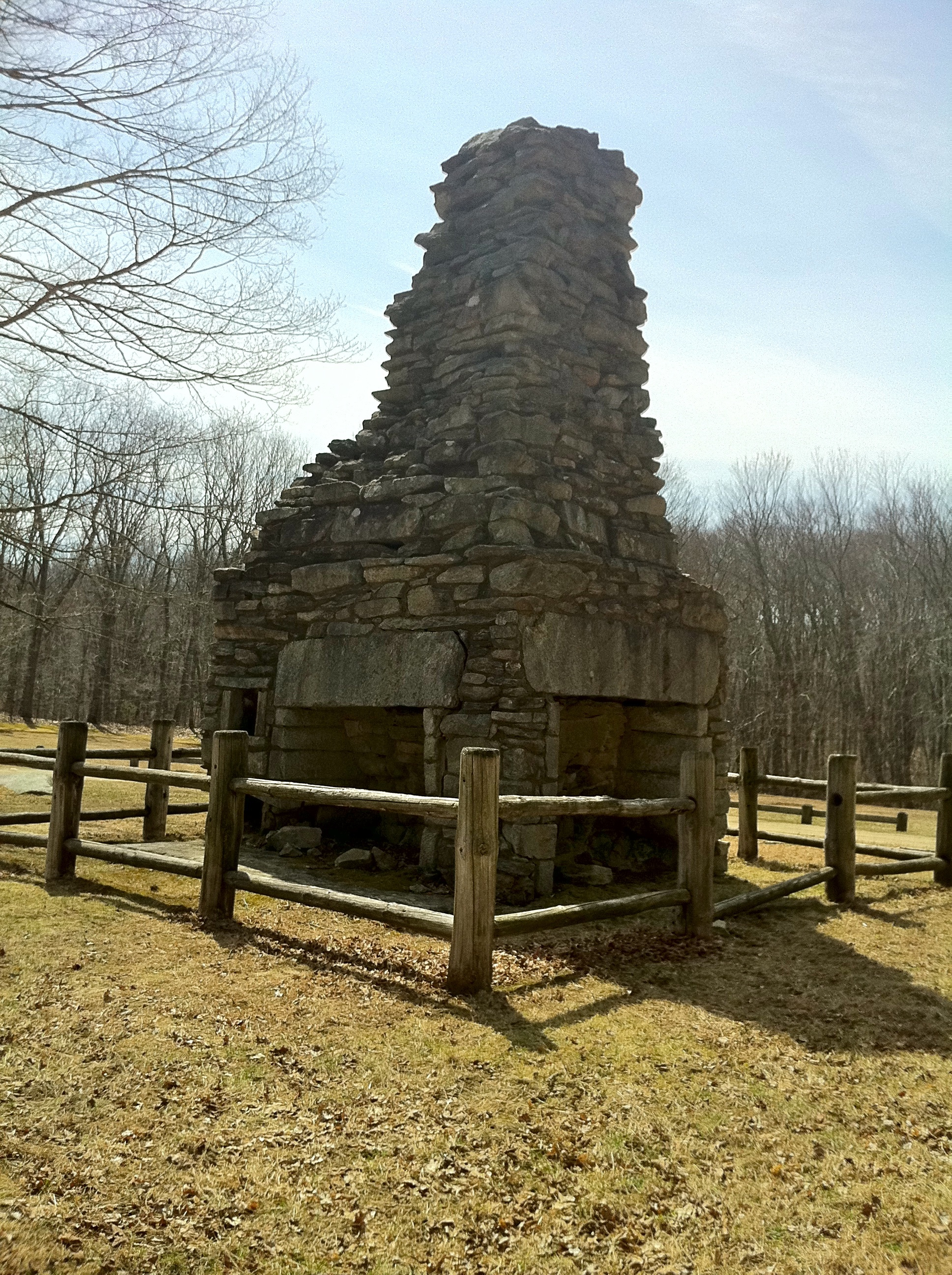
A stone chimney with four fireplaces is all that is left of General Nathaniel Lyon's birthplace homestead at Nathaniel Lyon Memorial State Park.

Nathaniel Lyon was born on July 14, 1818, to Amasa and Kezia Lyon. His father was a sawmill operator who also dabbled in farming, and his mother was related to Revolutionary War hero Thomas Knowlton. Raised on his father's farm, Nathaniel performed farm chores as a young child; at an early age he gained a reputation for seriousness and having a short temper. Amasa was strict and not affectionate towards his children, and Nathaniel grew quite close to his mother. Kezia was a devoted Christian, but Amasa tended towards rejecting organized Christianity, raising doubts about religion in Nathaniel's young mind. He was educated in the local school system, and briefly attended an academy in Brooklyn, Connecticut. After recommendations from family acquaintances, United States Representative Orrin Holt secured Lyon's appointment to the United States Military Academy (West Point) in early 1837.

Lyon officially entered West Point on July 1, 1837, While there, he established a record of good discipline, receiving few demerits, although he received 12 for a single incident in February 1841 related to an incident of insubordination when he angrily refused to turn over his orders to an officer. Academically, he struggled with calculus, drawing, and infantry tactics, but did well in natural philosophy, engineering, and artillery. Lyon's cousin Miner Knowlton was an assistant professor at West Point and served as a mentor for him. In 1841, he graduated from West Point ranked number 11th out of 52 cadets. Around this time, Lyon also displayed a romantic affection for a woman known as "Miss Tot"; her identity and the details of the relationship are unknown, but biographer Christopher Phillips suggests that the failure of this relationship may have contributed to Lyon's later decision to never marry. Traditionally, higher-ranked graduates of West Point were given the option to enter the United States Corps of Engineers, which was viewed as a desirable assignment, but Lyon instead chose to be assigned to the infantry, where he believed that promotion would come quicker. Briefly returning to Ashford after his graduation, Lyon received a commission as a second lieutenant on July 1.

== Military career ==
Upon graduating from West Point, Lyon was commissioned as a 2nd lieutenant and assigned to the 2nd U.S. Infantry Regiment after graduation and served with them in the Seminole Wars and the Mexican–American War. Despite denouncing American involvement in the Mexican War, he was promoted to first lieutenant for "conspicuous bravery in capturing enemy artillery" at the Battle for Mexico City and received a brevet promotion to captain for the battles of Contreras and Churubusco. Although he was eligible for membership, Lyon did not join the Aztec Club of 1847 when it was formed in Mexico City in 1847.

After the Mexican War, Lyon was posted to the Benicia Barracks, California. In 1850, he commanded an expedition to punish some Pomo who killed two notorious settlers who were infamous for their treatment of enslaved indigenous people near present day Kelseyville,California. Lyon's combined force of 75 included infantry, artillery, and dragoons. On his way to Clear Lake, California, he indiscriminately killed some 35 Wappo in Upper Napa Valley. Arriving at Upper Clear Lake on May 15, 1850, Lyon discovered multiple Pomo on Bo-No-Po-Ti Island. He then perpetrated the massacre of Pomo Native Americans known as the "Bloody Island Massacre"; in which as many as 200 old men, women, and children were slaughtered by artillery, guns, and sabers. Several days later, Lyon was responsible for another massacre known as the Russian River Massacre at the village of Cokadjal, which was a small island near the river some 5 miles south of present-day Ukiah, killing 75 to 100 people, albeit the number was likely double. In his after-action report, Lyon said, "Their position being entirely surrounded, they were attacked under most embarrassing circumstances, but as they could not escape, the island soon became a perfect slaughter pen." This massacres were the first large-scale military expedition aimed at eliminating indigenous people of their guilt.

In December 1851, he served as a judge on the courts martial of George H. Derby, the famous humorist, and Joseph Hooker, the assistant adjutant general of the Pacific Division in Sonoma, California and future famous Civil War commander.

After being reassigned to Fort Riley, Kansas, Lyon became staunchly antislavery. He did not support the radicalism of the abolitionists, and came to support the Republican Party while serving in the border wars known as "Bleeding Kansas." In January 1861, he wrote about the secession crisis, "It is no longer useful to appeal to reason, but to the sword."

== American Civil War ==
=== St. Louis Arsenal ===
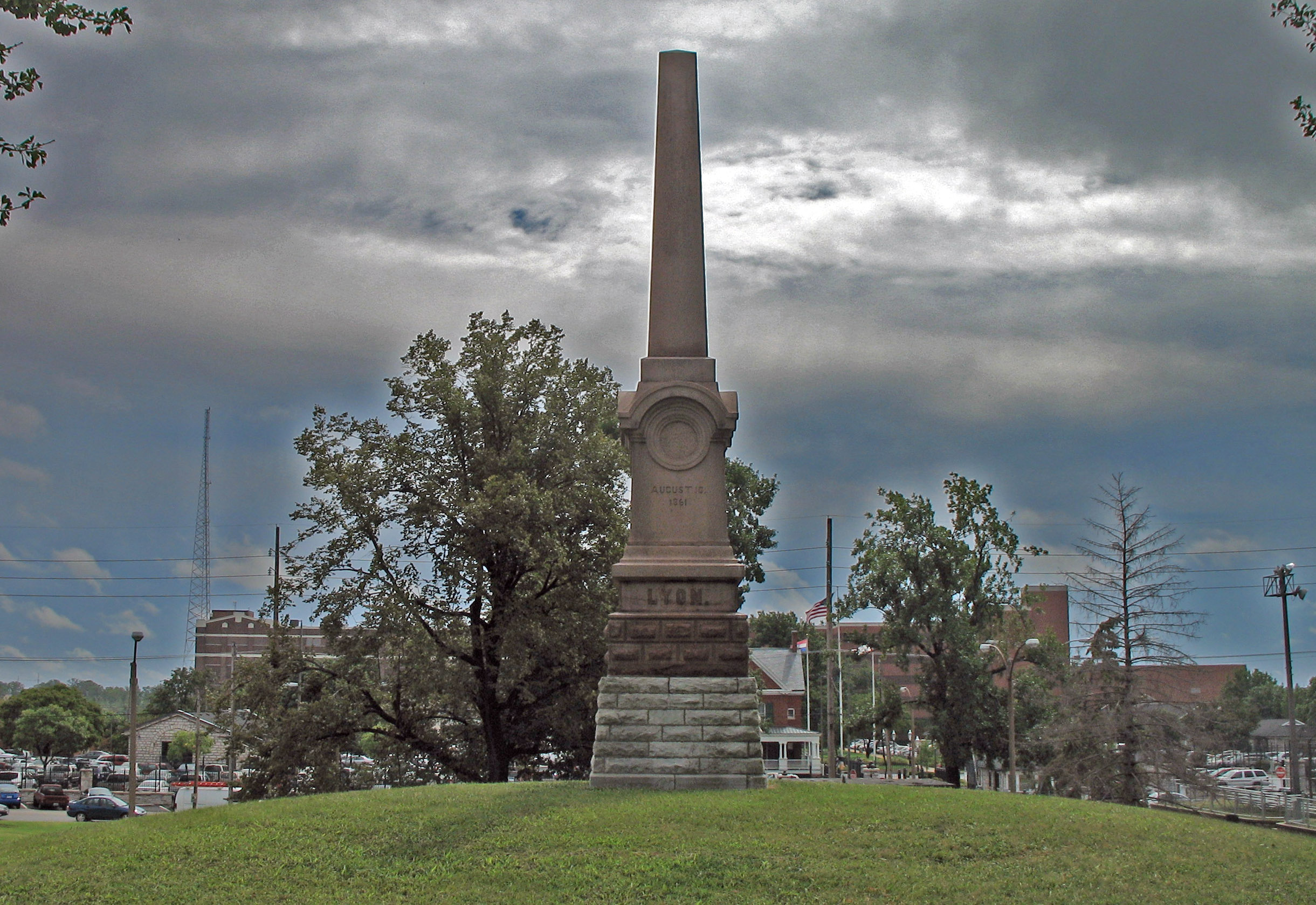
A monument to Nathaniel Lyon with the St. Louis Arsenal in the background

In March 1861, shortly before the outbreak of the American Civil War, Lyon arrived in St. Louis in command of Company B of the 2nd U.S. Infantry. At the time the population and state of Missouri were relatively neutral in the dispute between North and South, but Governor Claiborne F. Jackson was a strong Southern sympathizer, as were many of the state legislators. Lyon guessed correctly that Jackson would seize the federal arsenal in St. Louis if the state seceded and that the Union had insufficient defensive forces to prevent the seizure.

He attempted to strengthen the defenses, but came into opposition from his superiors, including Brig. Gen. William S. Harney of the Department of the West. Lyon employed his friendship with Francis P. Blair Jr., to have himself named commander of the arsenal. When the Civil War broke out and President Abraham Lincoln called for troops to put down the Confederacy, Missouri was asked to supply four regiments. Governor Jackson refused the request and ordered the Missouri State Guard to muster outside St. Louis under the stated purpose of training for home defense.

=== Wide Awakes ===
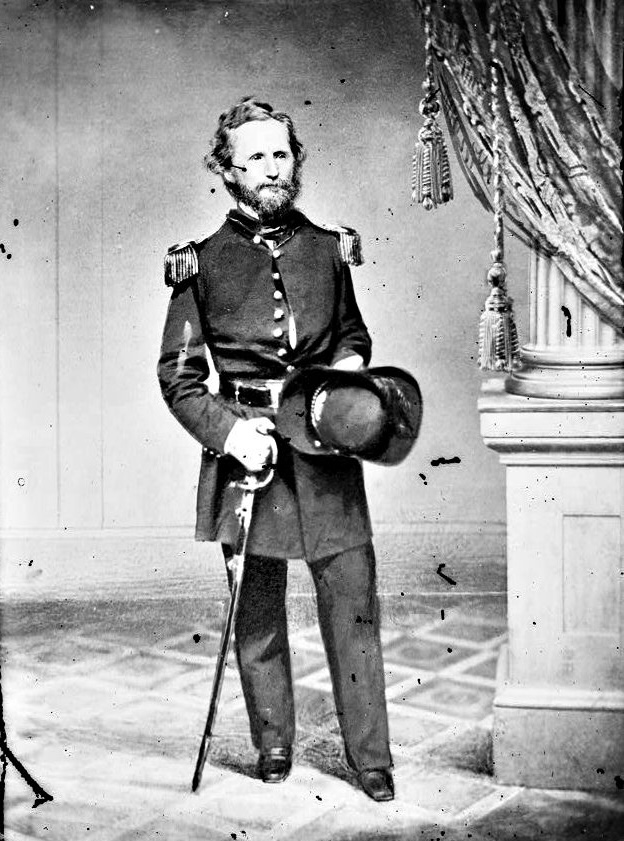
General Nathaniel Lyon

Lyon himself had been extensively involved in the St. Louis Wide Awakes, a pro-union paramilitary organization that he intended to arm from the arsenal and muster into the ranks of the federal army. Upon obtaining command of the arsenal, Lyon armed the Wide Awake units under guise of night. Lyon had most of the excess weapons in the arsenal secretly moved to Illinois.

Lyon was aware of a clandestine operation whereby the Confederacy had shipped captured artillery from the U.S. arsenal in Baton Rouge to the Missouri State Militia camp in St. Louis. Lyon allegedly disguised himself as a farm woman to spy on the State Guard's camp and then claimed that he had uncovered a plan by Jackson to seize the arsenal for Missouri troops.

=== Camp Jackson affair ===
On May 10 Lyon directed the Missouri volunteer regiments and the 2nd U.S. Infantry to the camp, forcing its surrender. Riots broke out in St. Louis as Lyon marched his prisoners through the city to the St. Louis Arsenal. The event provoked the Camp Jackson Affair of May 10, 1861, in which Lyons' troops opened fire on a crowd of civilians injuring at least 75 and killing 28.

Two federals and three militia were also killed and others were wounded. The source of the first shot is disputed, some witnesses claiming it was a drunken rioter, others claiming it was unprovoked. Lyon was nonetheless promoted to brigadier general May 17, and given command over the Union troops in Missouri May 31, 1861 as commander of the Department of the West.

=== Planters House Conference ===
On June 12, 1861 Lyon (accompanied by Congressman Colonel Francis P. Blair Jr.) met with Governor Jackson and Major General Sterling Price of the Missouri State Guard (who both traveled under a safe conduct from Lyon) at St. Louis' Planter's House hotel to discuss the implementation and potential continuation of the Price–Harney Truce between Federal forces and the State Guard. The discussions were conducted largely between Lyon and Jackson, who were generally intransigent in their respective positions: that U.S. forces had the right to move anywhere in the state, and that Federal forces should be restricted to the St. Louis-area, respectively.

After four unproductive hours Lyon eventually halted the meeting, informing Governor Jackson and MG Price that Jackson's demanded limitations on federal authority "means war". Lyon then allowed the two to leave St. Louis for Jefferson City by train, in accordance with the safe conduct.

=== Pursuit of Jackson ===
The governor fled first to the capitol at Jefferson City (ordering the tracks destroyed behind him), and then retreated with the State Guard to Boonville. Lyon moved up the Missouri River by steamer and occupied Jefferson City without a fight on June 13. Lyon continued the pursuit and on June 17 he defeated a portion of the State Guard at the Battle of Boonville. The governor, his administration, and the Guard retreated to the southwest.

Lyon was subsequently supported by the reconvened Missouri State Convention which reconvened on July 22, 1861, declared the office of Governor and other state officials "vacant", and appointed a Unionist provisional state government under former Missouri Chief Justice Hamilton Gamble. Lyon assumed command of the Army of the West on July 2. Lyon reinforced his army before moving southwest in pursuit of Jackson, Price and the State Guard.

=== Battle of Wilson's Creek and death ===
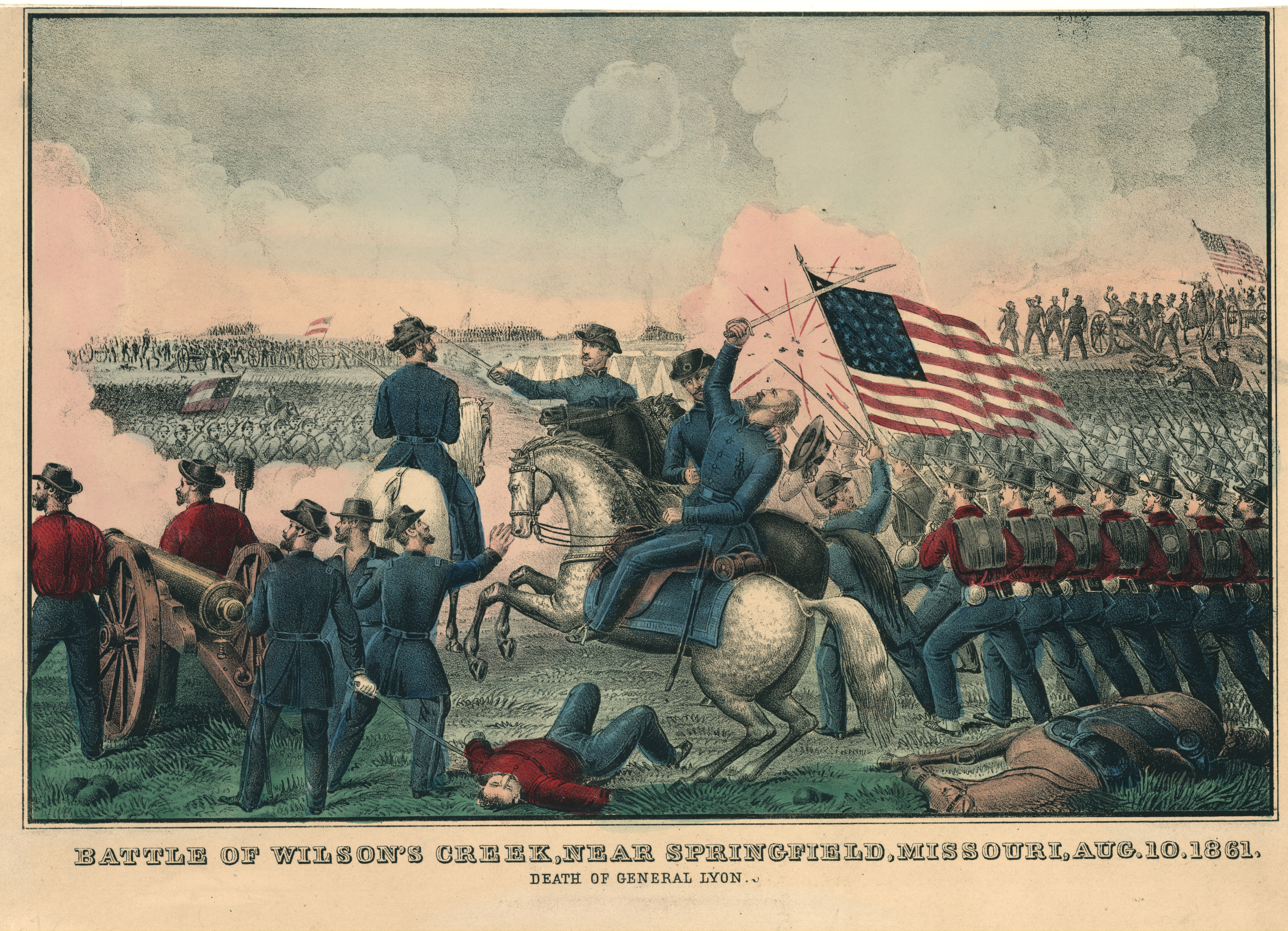
Death of General Lyon in the Battle of Wilson's Creek

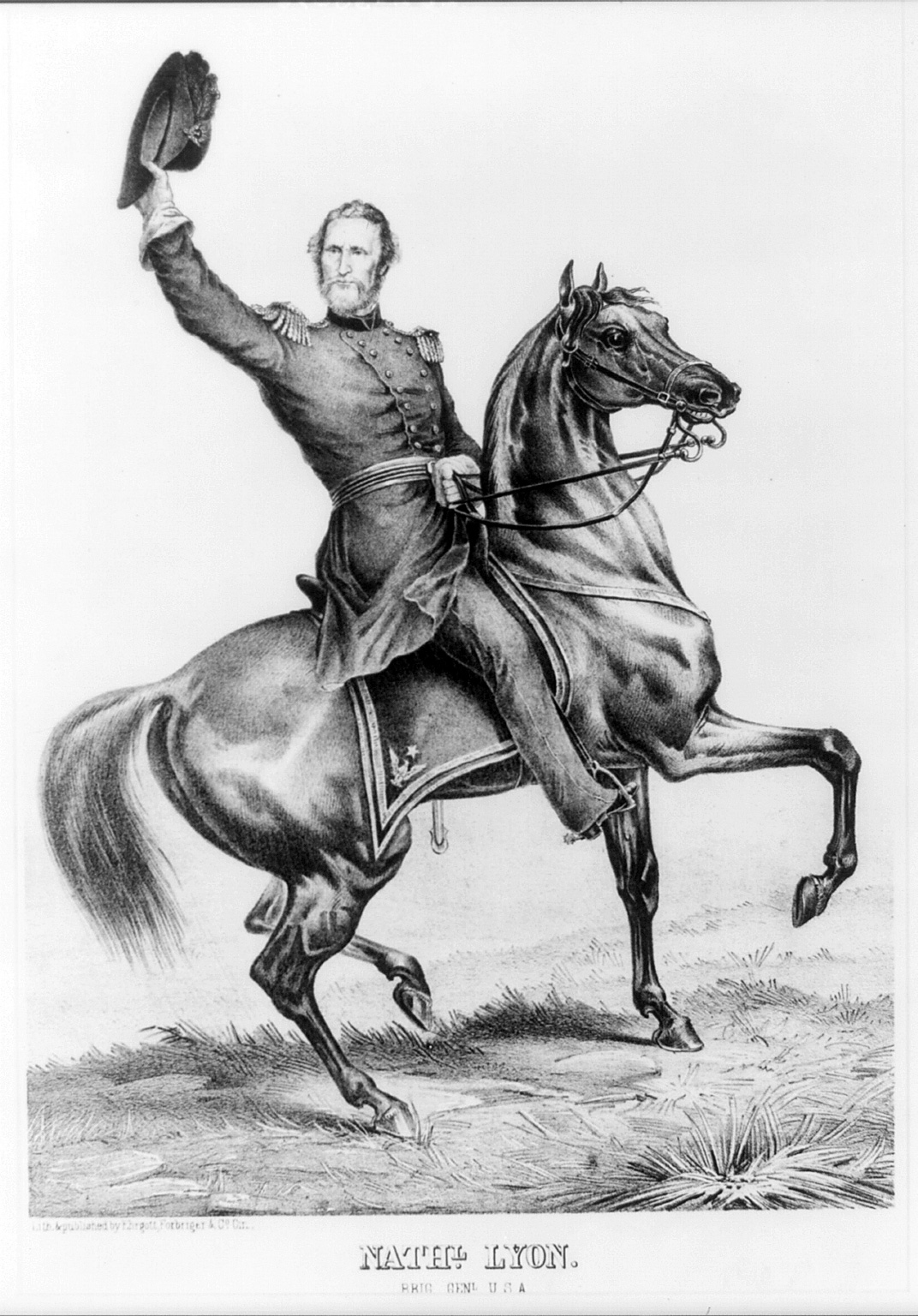
Nathaniel Lyon, lithograph possibly depicting the Battle of Wilson's Creek

By July 13, Lyon was encamped at Springfield, Missouri, with about 6,000 Union soldiers. The Missouri State Guard, about 75 miles southwest of Lyon and under the command of Price, met with troops under Brig. Gen. Benjamin McCulloch near the end of July. The combined Confederate forces numbered about 12,000, formed plans to attack Springfield, and marched northeast on July 31.

The armies met at dawn a few miles southwest of Springfield on the morning of August 10 in the Battle of Wilson's Creek. Lyon was wounded twice in the fighting; shot in the head and leg and his horse shot from under him. He returned to Union lines and commandeered a bay horse ridden by Maj. E.L. McElhaney of the Missouri Infantry. Lyon, badly outnumbered by Confederate forces, then dramatically led a countercharge of the 2nd Kansas Infantry on Bloody Hill, where he was shot in the heart at about 9:30 am. Although the Union Army was defeated at Wilson's Creek, Lyon's quick action neutralized the effectiveness of pro-Southern forces in Missouri, allowing Union forces to secure the state.

== Fate of Lyon's remains ==
In the confused aftermath of the Union retreat from Wilson's Creek, Lyon's body was mistakenly left behind on the battlefield and discovered by Confederate forces. It was briefly buried on a Union soldier's farm outside Springfield until it could be returned to Lyon's relatives. Eventually the remains were interred at the family plot in Eastford, Connecticut, where an estimated crowd of 15,000 attended the funeral. A cenotaph stands in memory of Lyon in the Springfield National Cemetery, Missouri.

== Legacy ==
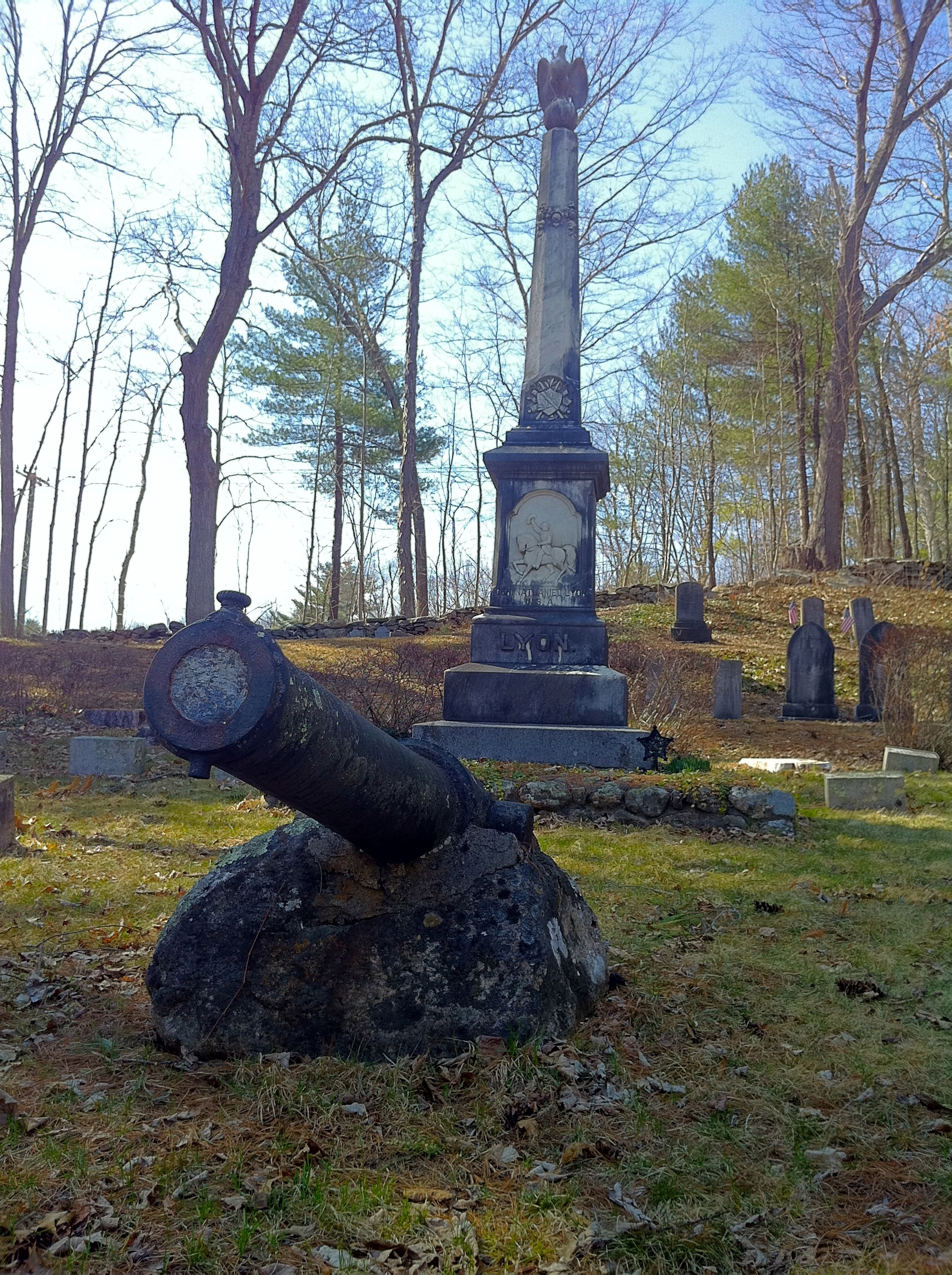
General Nathaniel Lyon's Grave in General Lyon Cemetery in Eastford, Connecticut

On December 24, 1861, the United States Congress passed a resolution of thanks for the "eminent and patriotic services of the late Brigadier General Nathaniel Lyon. The country to whose service he devoted his life will guard and preserve his fame as a part of its own glory. That the Thanks of Congress are hereby given to the brave officers who, under the command of the late general Lyon sustained the honor of the flag and achieved victory against overwhelming numbers at the battle of Springfield, Missouri."

The 24th Missouri Volunteer Infantry was recruited as "The Lyon Legion" in honor of the General, and carried a unique regimental color, depicting a Lion beneath a constellation of six stars. Counties in Iowa, Kansas, Minnesota, and Nevada, are named in Nathaniel Lyon's honor. Two forts were also named in his honor: Fort Lyon in Colorado and Fort Lyon (Virginia), which defended Washington, D.C., during the American Civil War. Lyon Park in St. Louis, Lyon Street in San Francisco and Lyon Lane in Carson City, Nevada are also named for him. Lyon is mentioned in Stephen C. Foster's 1862 song "Better Times Are Coming".

A monument honoring Nathaniel Lyon was erected on Grand Boulevard in St. Louis in 1927. However, the monument was removed in 1960 when Harriet Frost Fordyce, a St. Louis philanthropist and youngest child of Confederate General Daniel Frost, agreed to donate one million dollars to help expand St. Louis University's campus on the condition that Lyon's statue be removed. The city quickly removed the monument to Lyon Park, a small park near Anheuser-Busch Brewery. SLU later renamed its main campus the “Frost Campus” in honor of the Confederate General Frost.

Lyons Peak in San Diego County was named after Lyon. As an army captain, he passed by the peak in 1851 while scouting a new route east to the Colorado Desert.

== Dates of rank ==
- Cadet, United States Military Academy - 1 July 1837
- 2nd Lieutenant, 2nd Infantry - 1 July 1841
- 1st Lieutenant, 2nd Infantry - 16 February 1847
- Brevet Captain - 20 August 1847
- Captain, 2nd Infantry - 11 June 1851
- Brigadier General, Missouri Volunteers - 12 May 1861
- Brigadier General, US Volunteers - 17 May 1861

== See also ==
- Lyons family
- List of American Civil War generals (Union)
