= Koi, California =

Coordinates: 38.9402°N 122.6445°W

Koi (Southeastern Pomo: Xqoy) was one of the two principal Pomo villages in the southeastern section of Clear Lake, in present-day Lake County, California, United States. Along with the village of Elem, it was one of the major centers of the Southeastern Pomo triblet. Both settlements were located on islands near the shore of the lake and controlled surrounding mainland territory.

== Geography ==
Koi was located on Lower Lake Island, historically also known as Indian Island, near the southeastern arm of Clear Lake. The island provided both a defensible position and access to fishing, waterfowl, and other lake resources. The territory of Koi extended to parts of the nearby mainland, where hunting and plant gathering were carried out.

== History ==
Prior to European and American contact, Koi was part of the Southeastern Pomo cultural area. Along with Elem, it played a central role in trade and ceremonial life around Clear Lake.

During the mid-19th century, Pomo communities around Clear Lake were subjected to severe disruption due to settler encroachment, violence, and disease. In 1850, following the Bloody Island massacre, survivors from several Pomo villages were displaced or consolidated, with many eventually moving to what is now the Elem Indian Colony of Pomo Indians.

By the late 19th century, ethnographers recorded Koi only as a historic site, as its population had largely relocated.

== See also ==
- Pomo people
- Elem Indian Colony of Pomo Indians
- Clear Lake
