= Kelseyville High School =

Location
- 5480 Main St. Kelseyville, California 95451; United States
- Coordinates: 38.974547°N 122.830327°W

Information
- School type: Public
- Established: 1921
- School district: Kelseyville Unified School District (KVUSD)
- CEEB code: 051-290
- Principal: Mike Jones
- Teaching staff: 28.01 (FTE)
- Grades: 9 – 12
- Student to teacher ratio: 19.78
- Hours in school day: 8:15am – 3:22pm (374 minutes)
- Color
- Athletics conference: North Central League 1, Coastal Mountain Conference
- Team name: Knights
- Accreditation: Western Association of Schools and Colleges (WASC)
- Website: Kelseyville High website

Kelseyville High School is an American public high school located in Kelseyville, in Lake County, California. Kelseyville High serves grades 9-12 and is the only source of secondary education in the Kelseyville Unified School District (KVUSD).

== History ==
In 1923, Kelseyville Union School District supervisors voted to submit to district taxpayers a measure to finance the land acquisition and construction of Kelseyville Union High School. The proposition passed, and the construction of a $40,000 building with six classrooms and laboratories began in fall of 1924, near the site of Kelseyville Academy, a cross-shaped building that hosted students between 1886 and 1890.

In November 1929, a fire destroyed Kelseyville Union High School, prompting rumors of arson, as several other structures had also recently burned in the region. Classes were moved to former churches until the new school building was erected in the fall of 1930.

The school was expanded in 1954, and in 1957 a bond was put up for a vote to finance the construction of a new gymnasium, which was completed in early 1959.

In January 2019, improvements were made to existing buildings and a shop building was added, financed through a bond measure passed in 2016.

=== Mascot ===
The school adopted the Indians as their team's mascot in the 1940s. In 2006, the Kelseyville Unified School District agreed to drop the name, deemed offensive by some Native American and community members (Mountain Vista Middle School's mascot, the Braves, was also abandoned). Kelseyville High adopted the Knights as their new teams' name two months later. In 2008, the school board approved a motion to turn down a return to the Indian mascot brought about by a petition.

== Academics ==
For the 2022-2023 school year, Kelseyville High School's cohort dropout rate was 5.8%, and the graduation rate was 90.9%.

The only Advanced Placement course offered is in mathematics. The school contracts with Advancement Via Individual Determination to offer an elective class to prepare students for college. It has an agriculture mechanics program, working with the Kelseyville FFA Chapter and providing University of California-approved A-G classes. The school also offers vocational education pathways for agricultural science; cabinetry, millwork and woodworking; design, visual and media arts; as well as hospitality.

== Demographics ==
For the 2022–23 academic year, Kelseyville High School enrolled 540 students, according to the National Center for Education Statistics. The school employed 29.73 full-time equivalent educators, resulting in a student to teacher ratio of 18.2:1.

Enrollment by race and ethnicity (2022–23)
Race and ethnicity^{†}	Enrolled pupils	Percentage
African American	3	0.56%
Asian	6	1.11%
Hispanic	247	45.74%
Native American	0	0%
White	228	42.22%
Native Hawaiian, Pacific islander	0	0%
Multi-race	38	7.04%
Total	522	97%
^{†} "Hispanic" includes Hispanics of any race. All other categories refer to non-Hispanics.

Enrollment by gender (2022–23)
Gender	Enrolled pupils	Percentage
Female	255	47.22%
Male	280	51.85%
Non-binary	5	0.93%
Total	540	100%

Enrollment by grade (2022–23)
Grade	Enrolled pupils	Percentage
9	148	27.41%
10	142	26.3%
11	125	23.15%
12	125	23.15%
Ungraded	0	0%
Total	540	100%

In addition, California Department of Education reported the following demographic percentages of students for the 2022 – 2023 school year.

Demographic descriptor	Percent of total enrollment
English learners	13.7%
Foster youth	0.6%
Homeless	6.5%
Migrant	4.3%
Socioeconomically disadvantaged	65.6%
Students with disabilities	12%

== Athletics ==
The Kelseyville Knights compete in the North Central League 1 in the Coastal Mountain Conference.

The school competes in baseball, basketball, cross country, football, golf (coed), soccer, softball, tennis, track and field, wrestling, and girls volleyball.

The school established a mountain biking program in 2011, and Kelseyville High students participate in the Middletown Composite team to compete in the NorCal Interscholastic Cycling League's Division 2 of the Redwood Repack.
