= Juan Coy =

Belizean politician

Minister of State Juan Coy
- In office 2008–2012

Personal details
- Born: Belize City, Belize
- Party: United Democratic Party
- Spouse: Brigida Coy (deceased)

Juan Coy is a Belizean politician. He was elected to the House of Representatives in 2008 for the Toledo West constituency. Coy was appointed as Minister of State in the Ministry of Human Development. In 2012, he lost re-election to Oscar Requeña.
