= KOI =

KOI may refer to:

- KOI character encodings, for Cyrillic script
- Indonesian Olympic Committee (Indonesian: Komite Olimpiade Indonesia)
- Kepler object of interest
- Kirkwall Airport (IATA airport code)
- Komi-Permyak language (ISO language code)
- Movistar KOI (Spanish professional esports organization)
- Torre KOI (skyscraper in Mexico)
- Toronto KOI (Canadian professional esports organization)

== See also ==
- KOI-18, a cryptographic fill device used by the U.S. government
- Koi (disambiguation)
