= COI =

COI, CoI or Coi may refer to:

== Organizations ==
- Center on Organizational Innovation, a research center at Columbia University
- Central Office of Information, a former UK Government department
- Church of Ireland, an autonomous province of the Anglican Communion
- College of Idaho, a university
- Commission de l'Océan Indien, or Indian Ocean Commission

== Science and technology ==
- California Oregon Intertie or Path 66, an electrical power transmission system
- Centre of inertia
- Coefficient of Inbreeding, the probability that two alleles at a given locus are identical by descent
- Community of inquiry, a concept describing the social quality of scientific inquiry
- Community of interest (computer security), a computer networking technique of segregation of resources
- Confirmed opt-in, a policy for obtaining mailing list recipients
- Contingency Orbit Insertion, an abort mode of the Apollo spacecraft
- Cost of illness, see Disease burden
- Cytochrome Oxidase Subunit 1, a gene
- Coprocessor Offload Infrastructure, a high-level software library for code and data offloading to a Xeon Phi Coprocessor

== Other uses ==
- Comoros, UNDP country code
- Commission of inquiry (disambiguation)
- Constitution of India
- Conflict of interest
- Certificate of insurance
- Certificate of incorporation
- Coi (restaurant), restaurant in San Francisco, California
- Dennis Coi (died 1987), Canadian figure skater
- Trịnh Cối (died 1584), Vietnamese de facto ruler of Southern dynasty
- Coi (album), a 2023 album by Coi Leray

== See also ==
- Coy (disambiguation)
- Koi (disambiguation)
