= Benjamin Kelsey =

American pioneer

Benjamin "Ben" Kelsey
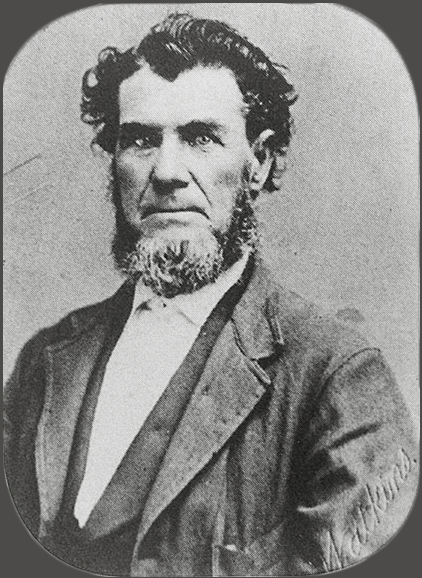
- Benjamin Kelsey photographed by Carleton E. Watkins.
- Born: Benjamin Kelsey; 1813; Kentucky
- Died: February 19, 1889 (aged 75–76); Los Angeles, California
- Occupation: California pioneer
- Known for: overland crossing of U.S. with Bartleson-Bidwell party, native American mistreatment and murders

Benjamin or Ben Kelsey (1813 – February 19, 1889) was an early American pioneer of California with his brothers Andrew and Sam Kelsey. He was a founder, often with one or more of his brothers, of several settlements in California.

Kelsey was born in Kentucky in 1813. He and his wife Nancy Kelsey arrived in Alta California in the Bartleson–Bidwell Party in 1841. In 1844, he brought a party of immigrants including his father David and brother Samuel from Oregon on the Siskiyou Trail to Sutter's Fort.

With his brothers, he participated in the Bear Flag Revolt of 1846, which ended Mexican control of California and established the California Republic. His wife Nancy is said to have sewn the first Bear Flag. He also served with his brothers in the California Battalion under Col. John C. Fremont and were honorably discharged in Los Angeles or San Gabriel in the early part of 1847.

In 1848, during the California Gold Rush, Ben Kelsey took fifty Pomo men from his brother Andrew's rancho near Kelseyville, Rancho Lupyomi, to the Sierra foothills in a gold mining venture, establishing a mining camp that became known as Kelsey Diggings. Once at the diggings, Ben decided it was more profitable to sell all the company's supplies to other miners than to pan for gold. After falling ill with malaria, he headed back to his home in Sonoma, leaving the others behind. The Pomo workers, forced to camp near a hostile group of local Indians and suffering from malaria and starvation, were left on their own. Only one or two are thought to have survived. This mistreatment of the Pomo and that of Andrew and his partner later led to the Bloody Island Massacre.

Benjamin Kelsey's willful neglect combined with disease and exposure killed as many as ninety-nine Indian men in 1849. Following the murder of his brother Andrew in 1850, Benjamin Kelsey seems to have joined a vigilante group that killed an unknown number of Indians. Released on bail in California's first Supreme Court case, he never stood trial. Vigilante violence Kelsey led and participated in is attributed to various factors: a response to the killings of his brother Andrew, a failure to distinguish between different California tribes, a belief in the efficacy of "pedagogical violence", and hoping the indigenous population would leave to make room for European American settlers.

After recovering from malaria, Ben used his profits to buy sheep which he drove to the mines and used that money to set up a trading post in the Sacramento Valley but lost his investment when he became ill. In September 1850, Ben and his brother Samuel came to Union, in Humboldt County. He purchased land there and built a house on it. His brother Samuel purchased property directly south of Ben and also owned a smaller parcel. Both however eventually lost their properties, Ben to mortgage foreclosure and Samuel to a default on a note.

Ben returned with his family to Sonoma for a short time, then moved to Oregon. In 1859, he moved his family to Mexico, and then to Texas in 1861. There, his wife and children survived an attack by Comanche, one of his daughters survived being scalped, but reportedly suffered mental illness afterward. In 1865, his family was back in California near Fresno, where his mentally ill daughter died. It was at this time he and his sons were accused of being members of the Mason Henry Gang. Suspicion may have fallen on him because his brother Samuel had been accused of being a leader among the secessionists in San Bernardino at the start of the American Civil War.

In later years, he moved on to Inyo County during the time of the 1872 Lone Pine earthquake, working in the Cerro Gordo Mines, and finally moved to Los Angeles, where he died on February 19, 1889, at the age 76. He was buried in Rosedale Cemetery, in Los Angeles.
