= Koi (magazine) =

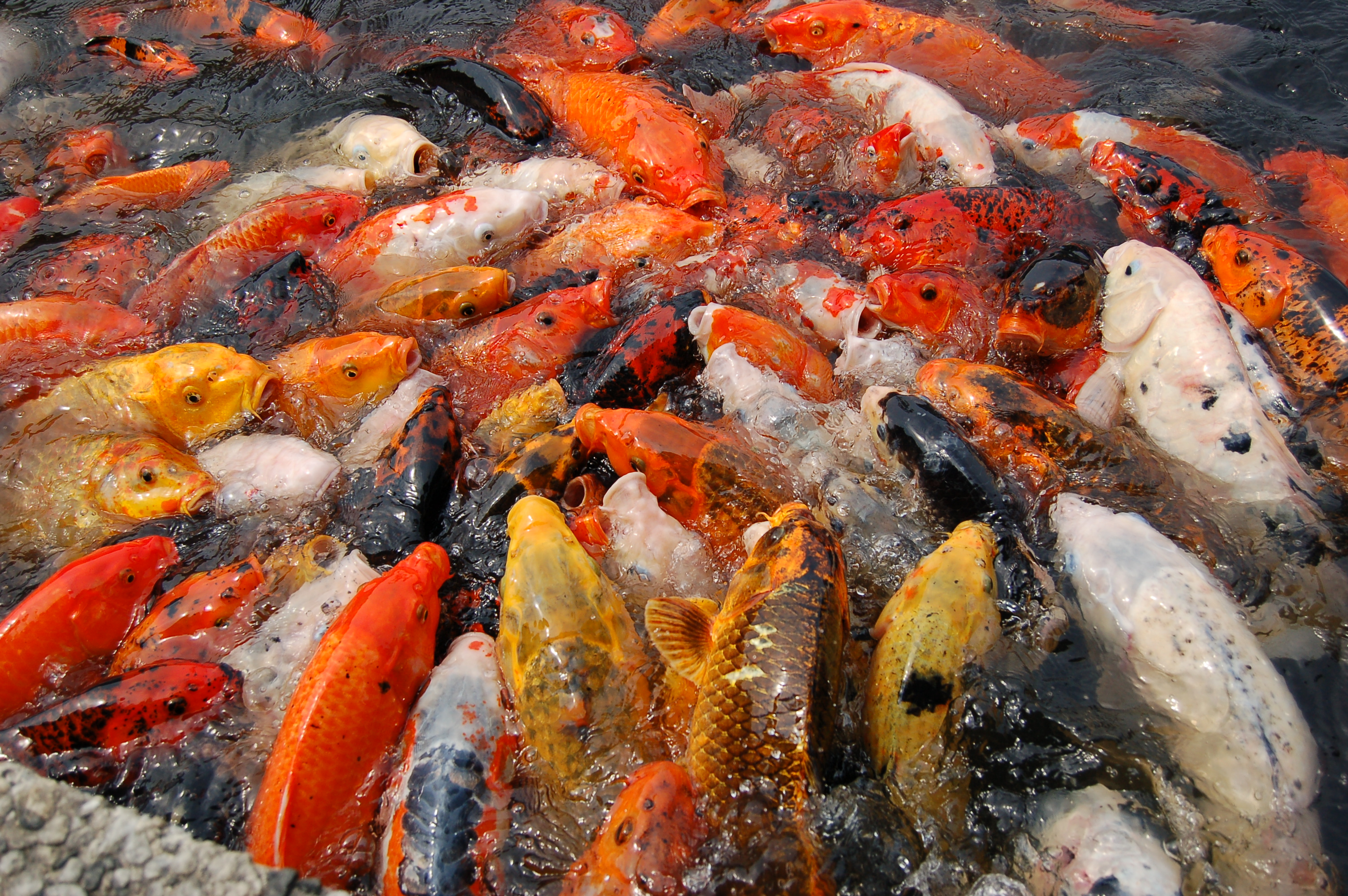
A koi

Koi magazine is a British guide to the Koi keeping hobby.

== History ==
Koi magazine was launched by Origin Publishing in February 1999 as Koi, Ponds and Gardens and is published 13 times a year. The title changed to Koi in September 2004 to reflect its focus on Koi keeping. It is also the official magazine of the British Koi Keepers Society.
