= Coy Branch =

Stream in the US state of Missouri

Coordinates: 39.3994810°N 92.3843466°W

Coy Branch is a stream in Randolph County in the U.S. state of Missouri. It is a tributary of Coon Creek.

Coy Branch has the name of a pioneer citizen.

== See also ==
- List of rivers of Missouri
