= Coy Cook =

American singer

- Genres: Christian: Southern Gospel
- Formerly of: Florida Boys; Dixie Echoes; Coy Cook and the Senators

Coy Cook (January 30, 1924 – May 17, 1996) was the tenor for the Florida Boys, a Southern Gospel quartet, from 1958 through 1966. Following the Florida Boys, he joined the Dixie Echoes, where he remained for approximately three years. He formed Coy Cook and the Senators, and the group was at its peak during the 1970s.
