= Ah Koy =

Ah Koy is a surname. Notable people with the surname include:

- Rachel Ah Koy (born 1989), Fijian swimmer
- James Ah Koy (born 1936), Fijian businessman and politician
