= Kelsey, California =

Unincorporated community in California, United States

Kelsey
- Unincorporated community
- Location in California Kelsey (the United States)
- Coordinates: 38°47′56″N 120°49′15″W
- Country: United States
- State: California
- County: El Dorado
- Elevation: 1,923 ft (586 m)

Kelsey (formerly Kelsey's Diggings) is an unincorporated community in El Dorado County, California, United States. It is located 2 miles (3.2 km) north of Chili Bar, at an elevation of 1,923 feet (586 m).

A post office operated at Kelsey from 1856 to 1872, from 1875 to 1903, with several moves, and from 1920. The name honors Benjamin Kelsey, who came to California in 1841 and discovered gold at the site in 1848. Kelsey at one time had 24 saloons, 12 stores, six hotels, two barber shops, and a makeshift court of justice.

Kelsey was among the first settlements of the California gold rush, with the first homes built in 1849. A schoolhouse was built in 1858, and rebuilt in 1903; it remained in service until 1984.

== Education ==
The Black Oak Mine Unified School District serves Garden Valley.

== Climate ==
The Köppen Climate Classification subtype for this climate is Csa (Hot-summer Mediterranean Climate).
