= Kelseyville, California =

- Unincorporated community Census-designated place
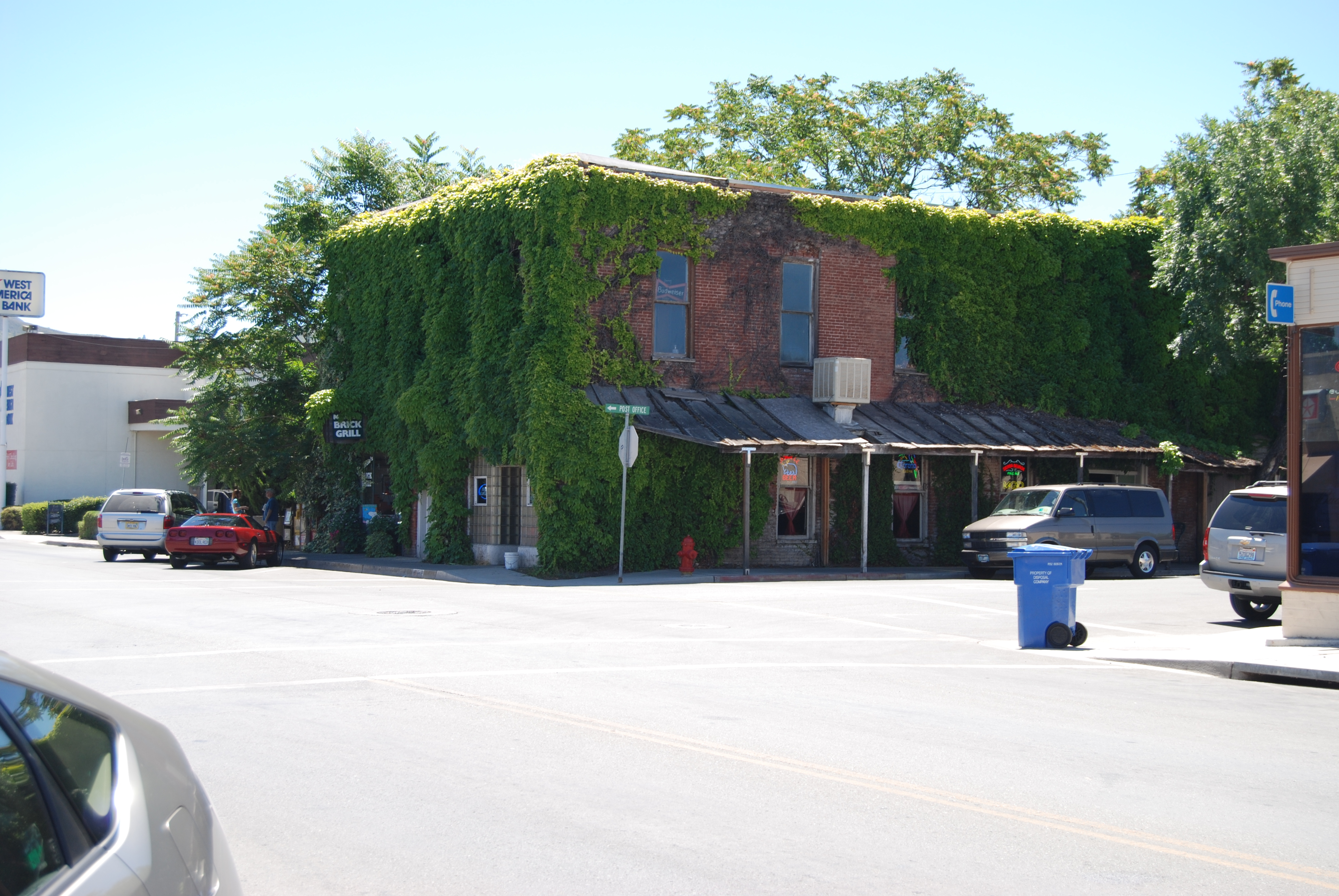
- The Brick House, downtown Kelseyville

- Location within Lake County and the state of California
- Coordinates: 38°58′41″N 122°50′22″W
- Country: United States
- State: California
- County: Lake

Area
  - Total: 2.891 sq mi (7.487 km^{2})
  - Land: 2.885 sq mi (7.472 km^{2})
  - Water: 0.0058 sq mi (0.015 km^{2}) 0.20%
- Elevation: 1,385 ft (422 m)

Population (2020)
  - Total: 3,382
  - Density: 1,172/sq mi (452.6/km^{2})
- Time zone: UTC-8 (Pacific (PST))
  - Summer (DST): UTC-7 (PDT)
- ZIP code: 95451
- Area code: 707
- FIPS code: 06-38044
- GNIS feature ID: 0277532

Kelseyville is an unincorporated community in Lake County, California, United States, located six miles (9.7 kilometers) southeast of Lakeport, at an elevation of 1,384 feet (422 meters). For statistical purposes, the United States Census Bureau has defined that community as a census-designated place (CDP). Its population was 3,382 according to the 2020 United States census.

== History ==
=== Name ===
The area has been formerly designated by European American settlers "Kelsey" or "Kelsey Creek", after Andrew Kelsey, one of the first Anglo-American settlers in Lake County, and his brother Benjamin Kelsey. Both men, along with Charles Stone and E.D. Shirland, acquired Salvador Vallejo's livestock in the Clear Lake area in 1847. Andrew Kelsey and Charles Stone were killed in 1849 in an uprising against him by bands of Wappo and Eastern Pomo whom they had enslaved. This episode led to the Bloody Island Massacre in May 1850.

The town was also sometimes designated "Uncle Sam" after Mount Uncle Sam, the name soldiers gave to Mount Konocti when they set up camp there in 1850. The Kelseyville name first appears in records in the 1860s, the result of lobbying on the part of William and Barthena Kelsay, who arrived with the Harriman Party in Lake County in 1861, "in honor of their Kelsey cousins". Voter registration records list the town as "Kelsey" in the 1860s, and the area is designated "Kelsey Creek" in the 1870 United States census. The "Town of Kelseyville" was legally established in 1871 as an assessor district. Both Bancroft's Guide of 1871, and Manafee's History of 1873 refer to the town as Kelseyville. Federal recognition first came in the 1880 United States census, and then the Uncle Sam Post Office was renamed to Kelseyville in October 1882. Kelseyville has also been nicknamed "Peartown" for its significant pear orchards planted during the Prohibition era.

The Kelseyville name has been the source of controversy since at least the 1980s because of its association with Andrew and Ben Kelsey. Several attempts have been made through petitions to suggest a name change. In 2020, a group of local community members, Citizens for Healing, formed in order to change Kelseyville's name. The group originally planned a petition to put the issue on the ballot (another petition was launched online in 2020), until they were informed of the correct method. The group, after securing approval from local tribes, filed a petition in October 2023 with the United States Board on Geographic Names (USBGN), requesting to rename the town "Konocti", after the mountain dominating the town's landscape. The initiative has triggered opposition from another group, which has been campaigning under the "Save Kelseyville" slogan, arguing that renaming the town could be costly and cause confusion. On July 30, 2024, the county's Board of Supervisors voted to approve a countywide "advisory measure" on the November 5 ballot to rename the town to "Konocti". The issue received support from the National Congress of American Indians. Measure U, which asked voters to recommend the name change to the Board, received 29.4% "Yes" and 70.6% "No" votes. On December 10, a majority of county Supervisors nevertheless voted in favor of recommending to the USBGN that the town be renamed Konocti. The California Advisory Committee on Geographic Names is expected to provide a recommendation as part of the process.

=== 19th century ===
In the centuries before Europeans arrived, the Eastern Pomo and Clear Lake Wappo (also designated as Lile'ek Wappo) people lived along the shores of Clear Lake. In addition to the fish caught in the lake and streams, they hunted waterfowl and gathered berries, seeds, clover and acorn. The Pomo and Wappo built homes and canoes of tule reeds found at the lakeshore.

Both Eastern Pomo and Clear Lake Wappo bands lived in the area now designated as Kelseyville, the Pomo concentrated along Kelsey Creek all the way to Cobb Mountain, and the Wappo along Cole Creek and on the western slope of Mount Konocti. At some point, both tribes allegedly warred when the Wappo attempted to divert fish from Kelsey Creek into Cole Creek. The Clear Lake Wappo, which were one of the tribes enslaved by Andrew Kelsey and Charles Stone, eventually disappeared from the area. The exact location of the former indigenous community of Xabenapo or Xalanapo (which according to some authors designates the people rather than the town) remains unknown, but it is estimated to have been slightly south of present-day Kelseyville proper, along Kelsey Creek. Several other names have been documented for the village itself: Nonapoti, Bidamiwina and Shabegok.

The Kelseyville area was part of Rancho Lupyomi, the land grant Californio Salvador Vallejo, Mariano Guadalupe Vallejo's brother, received in 1844 from the Mexican government. In 1847, Vallejo sold the livestock that had remained in the area to Ben and Andrew Kelsey, Charles Stone and E.D. Shirland. Andrew Kelsey and Charles Stone forced the local Indians to build them an adobe home about 3 miles (4.8 km) from the south shore of the lake, and immediately west of Kelsey Creek, as well as a large cattle corral. Stone and Kelsey enslaved the Pomo and Wappo people in two fenced camps they couldn't leave, forcing them to work under threat of torture and death. Many native people died of starvation and neglect. Stone and Kelsey were also known to rape native women and girls. Multiple and continuous abuse led to their killing by the indigenous population in 1849, which would lead to the Bloody Island Massacre in May 1850.

More European American settlers established themselves in the area in the mid-1850s, after the removal of indigenous populations to rancherias and the sale of Rancho Lupyomi was challenged in court.

According to Woods Crawford, an early pioneer quoted by historian Lyman L. Palmer, the first house built in the area (besides Stone and Kelsey's adobe home, which was eventually dismantled by other settlers salvaging materials) was built in 1853 at the foot of Mount Konocti by J. Broome Smith and William Graves, the latter a Donner Party survivor.

The first blacksmith shop was reportedly opened by a blacksmith named Benham in 1857. It was not until 1864 that a second business was opened, a store owned by T. F. Fall. That same year, another general store and a boarding house were opened by Rosenbreau and Pace.

== Geography ==
Kelsey Creek runs through the town and ends in Clear Lake.

The Kelseyville zip code also encompasses part of Big Valley, as well as the Soda Bay, Riviera Heights, Buckingham Park, Riviera West and Kelseyville Riviera neighborhoods. The community also encompasses Clear Lake State Park and Mount Konocti County Park.

According to the United States Census Bureau, the CDP has a total area of 2.9 square miles (7.5 square kilometers), with over 99 percent land.

== Demographics ==
Historical population
Census	Pop.	Note	%±
1980	1,567		—
1990	2,861		82.6%
2000	2,928		2.3%
2010	3,353		14.5%
2020	3,382		0.9%
U.S. Decennial Census; 1850–1870 1880-1890; 1900 1910 1920; 1930 1940 1950; 1960 1970 1980; 1990 2000 2010

The 1890 U.S. Census enumerated 282 residents in the town of Kelseyville, and 994 in the 1900 Census.

The community first appeared as a census designated place in the 1980 United States census under the name Kelseyville.

=== Racial and ethnic composition ===
Kelseyville CDP, California – Racial and ethnic composition Note: the US Census treats Hispanic/Latino as an ethnic category. This table excludes Latinos from the racial categories and assigns them to a separate category. Hispanics/Latinos may be of any race.
Race / Ethnicity (NH = Non-Hispanic)	Pop 2000	Pop 2010	Pop 2020	% 2000	% 2010	% 2020
White alone (NH)	1,909	1,861	1,581	65.20%	55.50%	46.75%
Black or African American alone (NH)	4	18	11	0.14%	0.54%	0.33%
Native American or Alaska Native alone (NH)	53	38	50	1.81%	1.13%	1.48%
Asian alone (NH)	26	32	27	0.89%	0.95%	0.80%
Pacific Islander alone (NH)	0	2	3	0.00%	0.06%	0.09%
Other Race alone (NH)	3	6	9	0.10%	0.18%	0.27%
Mixed race or Multiracial (NH)	91	59	154	3.11%	1.76%	4.55%
Hispanic or Latino (any race)	842	1,337	1,547	28.76%	39.87%	45.74%
Total	2,928	3,353	3,382	100.00%	100.00%	100.00%

=== 2020 census ===
As of the 2020 census, Kelseyville had a population of 3,382. The population density was 1,172.3 inhabitants per square mile (452.6/km^{2}). The median age was 39.4 years. 24.2% of residents were under the age of 18 and 17.3% were 65 years of age or older.

For every 100 females, there were 101.9 males, and for every 100 females age 18 and over there were 98.5 males age 18 and over. 0.0% of residents lived in urban areas, while 100.0% lived in rural areas.

The whole population lived in households. There were 1,245 households, of which 30.0% had children under the age of 18 living in them. Of all households, 44.8% were married-couple households, 8.0% were cohabiting-couple households, 20.2% had a male householder with no spouse or partner present, and 26.9% had a female householder with no spouse or partner present. About 29.4% of all households were made up of individuals, and 15.5% had someone living alone who was 65 years of age or older. The average household size was 2.72. There were 778 families (62.5% of all households).

There were 1,330 housing units at an average density of 461.0 units per square mile (178.0 units/km^{2}); 6.4% were vacant. Of occupied units, 63.0% were owner-occupied and 37.0% were occupied by renters. The homeowner vacancy rate was 1.2% and the rental vacancy rate was 4.9%.

=== Income and poverty ===
In 2023, the US Census Bureau estimated that the median household income in 2023 was $43,475, and the per capita income was $18,334. About 25.3% of families and 22.4% of the population were below the poverty line.

=== 2010 census ===
The 2010 United States census reported that Kelseyville had a population of 3,353. The population density was 1,159.9 inhabitants per square mile (447.8/km^{2}). The racial makeup of Kelseyville was 2,213 (66.0%) White, 22 (0.7%) African American, 51 (1.5%) Native American, 32 (1.0%) Asian, 2 (0.1%) Pacific Islander, 888 (26.5%) from other races, and 145 (4.3%) from two or more races. Hispanic or Latino of any race were 1,337 persons (39.9%).

The Census reported that 3,349 people (99.9% of the population) lived in households, 4 (0.1%) lived in non-institutionalized group quarters, and 0 (0%) were institutionalized.

There were 1,224 households, out of which 438 (35.8%) had children under the age of 18 living in them, 574 (46.9%) were opposite-sex married couples living together, 173 (14.1%) had a female householder with no husband present, 75 (6.1%) had a male householder with no wife present. There were 80 (6.5%) unmarried opposite-sex partnerships, and 13 (1.1%) same-sex married couples or partnerships. 323 households (26.4%) were made up of individuals, and 163 (13.3%) had someone living alone who was 65 years of age or older. The average household size was 2.74. There were 822 families (67.2% of all households); the average family size was 3.31.

The population was spread out, with 883 people (26.3%) under the age of 18, 298 people (8.9%) aged 18 to 24, 783 people (23.4%) aged 25 to 44, 912 people (27.2%) aged 45 to 64, and 477 people (14.2%) who were 65 years of age or older. The median age was 38.0 years. For every 100 females, there were 101.3 males. For every 100 females age 18 and over, there were 98.2 males.

There were 1,329 housing units at an average density of 459.7 per square mile (177.5/km^{2}), of which 785 (64.1%) were owner-occupied, and 439 (35.9%) were occupied by renters. The homeowner vacancy rate was 1.7%; the rental vacancy rate was 7.0%. 1,992 people (59.4% of the population) lived in owner-occupied housing units and 1,357 people (40.5%) lived in rental housing units.

== Economy ==
Kelseyville is part of the North Coast American Viticultural Area. The Kelseyville area also includes parts of the Big Valley District, Kelsey Bench and Red Hills AVAs. Other notable crops include walnuts, pears, olives, and cannabis. The community is home to the largest producer of organic saffron in California, Peace and Plenty Farm, as well as the Konocti Harbor Resort & Spa.

Kelseyville is also home to several wineries, an olive mill, packing facilities, as well as Stokes Ladders, an orchard and industrial ladder manufacturer. Several wine tasting rooms and a brewpub are located in downtown Kelseyville.

Since 1993, the town hosts the annual Kelseyville Pear Festival on the last Saturday in September.

== Governance ==
In the California State Legislature, Kelseyville is in the 2nd senatorial district, represented by Democrat Mike McGuire, and in the 4th Assembly district, represented by Democrat Cecilia Aguiar-Curry.

Federally, Kelseyville is in California's 4th congressional district, represented by Democrat Mike Thompson.

Kelseyville is served by the Kelseyville Fire District, headquartered at station 55, on the town's Main Street.

== Education ==
Public education in Kelseyville is facilitated by the Kelseyville Unified School District (KVUSD), which includes Kelseyville Elementary, Mountain Vista Middle School and Kelseyville High School. Shade Canyon Public Charter School opened in 2023 in Kelseyville, providing instruction from kindergarten through second grade, with plans to add a grade each year.

== Landmarks ==
=== Stone and Kelsey Home ===
The site of the adobe home Charles Stone and Andrew Kelsey forced local Native Americans to build them in the 1840s is located at the corner of Main Street and Bell Hill Road, immediately west of Kelsey Creek. Nothing is left of the home; its materials were salvaged by later white settlers. Stone's and Kelsey's remains are under the monument, which is designated as California Historical Landmark No. 426.

=== The Brick Tavern ===
Located at the corner of Main and Third Streets, the Brick Tavern, also known as the Brick House or the Kelseyville Tavern, was built in 1872 by Steve Tucker, possibly using bricks made from the kiln at the Sulphur Bank Mine across Clear Lake. Over the years, it served as a carriage stop, a hotel, a bar, a restaurant and a school, among other uses. It currently hosts an eponymously named saloon as well as a pizzeria. It was designated in 1961 as the "oldest commercial building" by the Lake County Historical Society and the Kelseyville Women's Club.

=== Gas Hill ===
Nowadays only marked by a sign atop a knoll along the southern stretch of Main Street, Gas Hill was the site of a natural gas pocket accidentally discovered in 1868 when digging a well. A match thrown into the hole triggered an explosion. Over the following decades, several successive owners attempted to commercialize the resource, but none succeeded.

== Media ==
The first newspaper in Kelseyville was The New Era, published in 1890. In 1901, The Kelseyville Sun was started by McEwen & McEwen. In 1912, they sold The Sun to E. E. Bryant and publication ceased in 1942.
