= Kois =

Kois (Greek: Κόης) is a surname of Greek origin. According to the Greek genealogical site ''Greek Ancestry'' and Greek telephone directories, the surname Kois originates from Aetolia-Acarnania, Western Greece. Notable people with the surname include:

- Dennis Kois, American graphic designer
- Valeri Kois (born 1950), Estonian politician
- Aristovoulos Kois, Greek army officer from Agrinio, Greece.

== See also ==
- Kois v. Wisconsin
