= Bloody Island massacre =

Mass killing of indigenous Californians by the US Military

Bloody Island Massacre
- Part of the California genocide
- Location: 39.149°N 122.888°W; Clear Lake, Lake County, California
- Date: May 15, 1850
- Target: Pomo under Chief Augustine
- Deaths: 60–200 Pomo Native American old men, women and children.
- Perpetrators: Elements of 1st U.S. Dragoons of the U.S. Army, under the command of Lieutenants Nathaniel Lyon and John Wynn Davidson
- Motive: Revenge for the deaths of slave owners Andrew Kelsey and Charles Stone, who were killed in a slave rebellion

California Historical Landmark
- Reference no.: 427

The Bloody Island Massacre was a mass killing of indigenous Californians by U.S. Dragoons that occurred on what was then an island in Clear Lake, California, on May 15, 1850. It is part of the wider California genocide.

A number of the Pomo, an indigenous people of California, had been enslaved by two settlers, Andrew Kelsey and Charles Stone, and confined to one village, where they were starved and abused until they rebelled and murdered their captors. In response, the U.S. Dragoons killed at least 60 of the local Pomo. In July 1850, a report by Major Edwin Allen Sherman contended that "There were not less than four hundred warriors killed and drowned at Clear Lake and as many more of squaws and children who plunged into the lake and drowned, through fear, committing suicide. So in all, about eight hundred Native Americans found a watery grave in Clear Lake."

== Location ==
The Bloody Island Massacre (also called the Clear Lake Massacre) occurred on what was then an island called in the Pomo language, Bo-no-po-ti or Badon-napo-ti (Island Village), at the north end of Clear Lake, Lake County, California, on May 15, 1850. It was a place where the Pomo had traditionally gathered for the spring fish spawn. After this event, it became known as Bloody Island. The lake has since receded so that Bloody Island is now a hilltop north of the body of water.

== Background ==
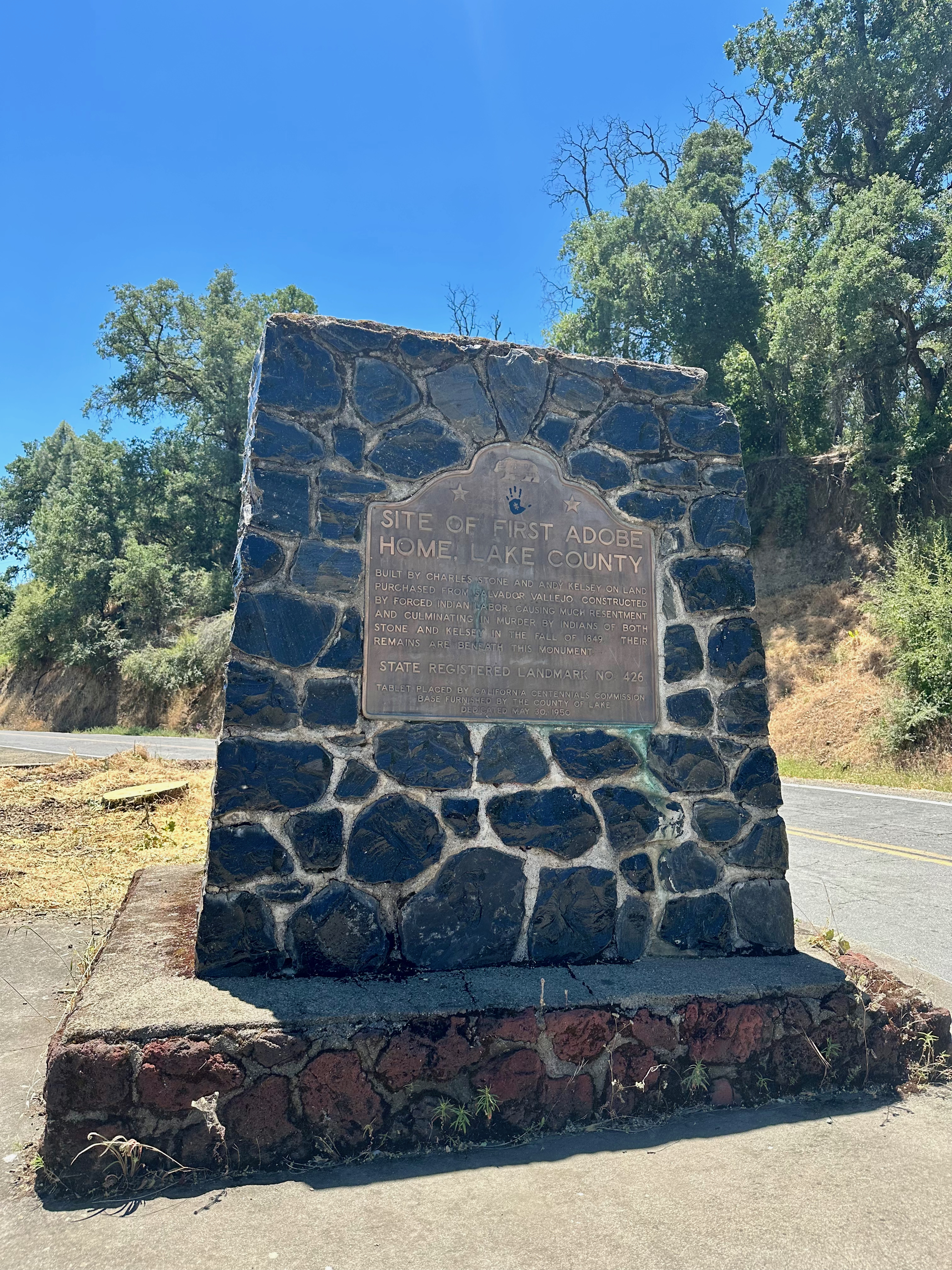
Site of Kelsey & Stone's house (and reburied remains), Cal. Landmark No. 426

Settlers Andrew Kelsey (namesake of Kelsey Creek and Kelseyville, California), his brother Ben, E. D. Shirland, and Charles Stone purchased cattle running free and grazing rights in Big Valley from Salvador Vallejo in fall 1847. Vallejo installed a series of major-domos who used Pomo labor to build a stockade and trained them as vaqueros. In contrast, Andrew Kelsey and Stone treated the local Native Americans roughly, capturing and impressing them into servitude. They also forced the Pomo to build them a permanent adobe house west across the creek from present-day Kelseyville but paid their efforts with short rations and a few handkerchiefs; when the Pomo complained, they were given lashes and harder tasks.

Because they made a residence there, their treatment of the Pomo was more brutal than had been Vallejo's. Eventually, the resentment built until the Pomo laid siege to the two men during the following spring (1848), trapping them in their house until Kelsey's brother Ben was informed of the situation and arrived several days later with several other men to find a scene as described in an 1881 history: "... the adobe house, with its doors barricaded, proving indeed a veritable fortress. Around it on all sides swarmed a host of naked savages, yelling and howling like so many ravenous beasts of the woods." Ben Kelsey and the other riders mounted a charge, shouting that soldiers were on their way; the Pomo dispersed and after the siege had been lifted, they found the Pomo had been protesting that Andrew Kelsey and Stone had taken all of their weapons.

After the siege, Ben Kelsey organized an expedition to Scotts Valley with a band of 144 Pomo, most of whom came from a group led by Chief Preetta; they were seeking another band of Native Americans which had been accused of poaching cattle. The group managed to capture one native and tortured him until he gave up their hiding location; the other band was flushed out and enslaved to Andrew Kelsey's ranch. Later that year, several natives, including Chief Augustine, were taken to Ben Kelsey's ranch in neighboring Sonoma County to see if they could be put to work building adobe houses, but this venture proved unsuccessful and they returned to Andrew's ranch by the fall of 1848.

The people were eventually confined to a village surrounded by a stockade and were not allowed weapons or fishing implements. Families starved on the meager rations they provided only four cups of wheat a day for a family. When one young man asked for more wheat for his sick mother, Stone reportedly killed him.

In the spring of 1849, Ben Kelsey forced 50 Pomo men to work as laborers on a gold-seeking expedition to the Placer gold fields. Although the group arrived at the fields in good shape, Kelsey found it more profitable to sell their supplies to the miners pouring into the region. After Kelsey and the others became ill with malaria, he was carried home and the Pomo were left to starve; only one or two men returned alive. Andrew Kelsey lied to the remaining Pomo, who were eager for news of the men that Ben had taken away, claiming they would return soon.

Other white settlers noted that Stone and Kelsey abused the Pomo, shooting and lashing them as a form of recreation. Stone and Kelsey also regularly forced the Pomo parents to bring their daughters to them to be sexually abused. If they refused they were whipped mercilessly. A number of them died from that abuse. Both men indentured and abused the Pomo women. By the fall of 1849, the starving Pomo became so desperate that

'Suk' and 'Xasis' took Stone's horse to kill a cow but the weather was bad and the horse ran off. Knowing they would be punished, (Chief) Augustine's wife poured water onto the two men's gunpowder, rendering it useless; Pomo warriors attacked the house at dawn, immediately killing Kelsey with an arrow. Stone jumped out a window and tried to hide in a stand of willow trees, but Augustine found him and killed him with a rock. The Pomo men took food back to their families and everyone left to join other relatives around the Lake. Some went to Badon-napoti where the spring fish spawn was underway.

An alternative account states that Kelsey and Stone had taken Chief Augustine's wife into their house as their concubine; one day, when the two settlers were out of the house with the vaqueros, she poured water into all of their guns, rendering them inert, and the next morning, the Pomo ambushed the two men at breakfast. In the immediate wake of the massacre, a news article claimed the Pomo had attempted to kill Ben Kelsey's wife after the ill-fated gold expedition; when the would-be assassin was killed by Ben instead, they took their revenge on Andrew Kelsey and Stone. Supposedly in response, the surviving Kelseys raised a posse and murdered 17 unrelated Indians in Napa and Sonoma counties, followed by the "terrible destruction" at Clear Lake wrought by government troops in May 1850.

== Massacre ==
On May 15, 1850, a contingent from the 1st U.S. Dragoons, of the United States Army under Nathaniel Lyon, then still a lieutenant, and Lieutenant J. W. Davidson tried to locate Augustine's band to punish them. When they instead came upon a group of Pomo on Badon-napoti (later called Bloody Island), they killed old men, women and children.

The soldiers under Davidson's command arrived "with orders to proceed against the Clear Lake Indians, and exterminate if possible the tribe." The National Park Service has estimated the army killed 60 of 400 Pomo; other accounts say 200 were killed. Most of the younger men were off in the mountains to the north, hunting. Some of the dead were relatives of the Habematolel Pomo of Upper Lake and the Robinson Rancheria of Pomo Indians of California. The army killed 75 more of the Pomo along the Russian River.

One of the Pomo survivors of the massacre was a 6-year-old girl named Ni'ka, or Lucy Moore. She hid underwater and breathed through a tule reed. Her descendants formed the Lucy Moore Foundation to work for better relations between the Pomo and other residents of California.

== Legacy ==
Later, the Pomo were forced to live in small rancherias set aside by the federal government. For most of the 20th century, the Pomo, reduced in number, survived on such tiny reservations in poverty. Few textbooks on California history mentioned the Bloody Island incident or abuse of the native Californians.

Two separate historical markers record the site. The one placed by the Native Sons of the Golden West on 20 May 1942 on Reclamation Road 0.3 mi (0.48 km) off Highway 20, describes the location as the scene of a battle between U.S. soldiers under "Captain" Lyons and Indians under Chief Augustine. California Historical Landmark No. 427, describing the location as the scene of a massacre mostly of women and children, was placed on Highway 20 at the Reclamation Road intersection on 15 May 2005 by the State Department of Parks and Recreation in cooperation with the Lucy Moore Foundation, a non-profit organization founded to educate the California public about the massacre. A 2015 article in Genocide Studies and Prevention analyzed how this plaque reflects on the massacre and its remembrance by both Native and colonial people.

== See also ==
- List of Indian massacres in North America
