= Robinson Rancheria of Pomo Indians of California =

- Tribal flag

Total population
- 477

Regions with significant populations
- United States (California)

Languages
- English, Pomoan languages

Religion
- Roundhouse religion, Christianity, Kuksu

Related ethnic groups
- Pomo tribes

The Robinson Rancheria of Pomo Indians of California is a federally recognized tribe of Eastern Pomo people in Lake County, California.

== Reservation ==
Location of Robinson Rancheria

The Robinson Pomo's reservation is the Robinson Rancheria, which is made up of two sites in Lake County. They are separated by eight miles and together total 113 acres (0.46 km^{2}) of trust lands. The larger section of land is 107 acres (0.43 km^{2}). The second section lies to the west, in the vicinity of 39°08′24″N 122°54′36″W. Of the approximately 477 members of the tribe, 153 live on the reservation. The reservation lies near the communities of Nice, Upper Lake, and North Lakeport.

The tribe conducts business from Nice, California.

== History ==
The US federal government terminated relations with the tribe in 1956, but the court case, Mabel Duncan, et al. v. US, settled in 1981 declared this termination illegal. After the 1956 termination of the Old Robinson Reservation, tribal members moved to urban areas. Federal recognition for the tribe was restored in the 1960s. In 1978 Robinson Rancheria organized a tribal government and adopted their constitution in 1980. Many tribal members live back on the reservation today.

In February, 2017, the tribe announced reinstatement of the nearly 70 members who were disenrolled in 2009. After tribal members spoke out, the tribal government voluntarily decided to reinstate without a court order.

== Government ==
The Robinson Pomo are governed by a democratically elected, six-person tribal council. Officers of the council are the tribal chairperson, vice-chairperson, and secretary-treasurer. Positions are to be elected for two-year terms and elections are held annually. The chairperson, secretary / treasurer, and (1) member at large position are held in the even years; and the vice chairperson, and two other member at large positions are held in the odd years.

== Economic and environmental development ==
The Robinson Rancheria Environmental Center operates a native plant nursery and a recycling center. The center also monitors local water quality and maintains tribal roads.

The tribe also operates the Robinson Rancheria Resort and Casino, the Pomo Smoke Shop, and "R Pomo Pumps."

== Education ==
The ranchería is served by the Upper Lake Union Elementary School District and the Upper Lake Union High School District.

== See also ==
- Pomo
