= Hidden Valley Lake, California =

- Census-designated place
- Location within Lake County and California
- Coordinates: 38°48′29″N 122°33′30″W
- Country: United States
- State: California
- County: Lake

Area
  - Total: 9.965 sq mi (25.808 km^{2})
  - Land: 9.820 sq mi (25.434 km^{2})
  - Water: 0.144 sq mi (0.374 km^{2}) 1.45%
- Elevation: 1,191 ft (363 m)

Population (2020)
  - Total: 6,235
  - Density: 634.9/sq mi (245.1/km^{2})
- Time zone: UTC-8 (Pacific)
  - Summer (DST): UTC-7 (PDT)
- ZIP code: 95467
- Area code: 707
- FIPS code: 06-33549
- GNIS feature IDs: 1766196, 2408382
- Website: hvla.com

Hidden Valley Lake is a census-designated place (CDP) and gated subdivision in Lake County, California, United States. It is a common-interest development managed by the Hidden Valley Lake Association (HVLA). Its population was 6,235 at the 2020 census, up from 5,579 at the 2010 census.

== History ==
In October 2014, The State Water Resources Control Board ordered the Hidden Valley Lake Community Services District to stop allowing new service connections to its water system due to concerns that, under current drought conditions, the district did not have enough water to meet future demands. The district, with about 2,500 connections, is a junior water rights holder in the Sacramento River and San Joaquin River watersheds. November 2020 the water moratorium was lifted and new water rights are currently available through the District, but at a much higher price point.

== Geography ==
According to the United States Census Bureau, the CDP has a total area of 10.0 square miles (26 km^{2}), of which 9.8 square miles (25 km^{2}) is land and 0.14 square miles (0.36 km^{2}) (1.45%) is water. In the west of the town, California State Route 29 runs through the town limits.

== Demographics ==
Historical population
Census	Pop.	Note	%±
1990	1,961		—
2000	3,777		92.6%
2010	5,579		47.7%
2020	6,235		11.8%
U.S. Decennial Census; 1990 2000 2010

Hidden Valley Lake first appeared as a census designated place in the 1990 U.S. census.

=== 2020 census ===
As of the 2020 census, Hidden Valley Lake had a population of 6,235 and a population density of 634.9 inhabitants per square mile (245.1/km^{2}). 0.0% of residents lived in urban areas, while 100.0% lived in rural areas.

Racial composition as of the 2020 census
Race	Number	Percent
White	4,680	75.1%
Black or African American	70	1.1%
American Indian and Alaska Native	93	1.5%
Asian	113	1.8%
Native Hawaiian and Other Pacific Islander	14	0.2%
Some other race	366	5.9%
Two or more races	899	14.4%
Hispanic or Latino (of any race)	1,097	17.6%

The age distribution was 23.2% under the age of 18, 6.3% aged 18 to 24, 22.4% aged 25 to 44, 28.3% aged 45 to 64, and 19.8% who were 65 years of age or older. The median age was 43.2 years. For every 100 females, there were 97.3 males, and for every 100 females age 18 and over there were 97.7 males age 18 and over.

The whole population lived in households. There were 2,354 households, of which 32.6% had children under the age of 18 living in them. Of all households, 54.0% were married-couple households, 8.6% were cohabiting couple households, 20.6% had a female householder with no spouse or partner present, and 16.9% had a male householder with no spouse or partner present. About 22.1% of all households were made up of individuals, and 12.1% had someone living alone who was 65 years of age or older. The average household size was 2.65. There were 1,660 families (70.5% of all households).

There were 2,612 housing units at an average density of 266.0 units per square mile (102.7 units/km^{2}), of which 2,354 (90.1%) were occupied. Of the occupied units, 81.6% were owner-occupied and 18.4% were occupied by renters. 9.9% of housing units were vacant. The homeowner vacancy rate was 2.2%, and the rental vacancy rate was 4.6%.

=== Income and poverty ===
In 2023, the US Census Bureau estimated that the median household income was $72,365, and the per capita income was $37,821. About 8.3% of families and 8.7% of the population were below the poverty line.

=== 2010 census ===
The 2010 United States census reported that Hidden Valley Lake had a population of 5,579. The population density was 564.2 inhabitants per square mile (217.8/km^{2}). The racial makeup of Hidden Valley Lake was 4,830 (86.6%) White, 63 (1.1%) African American, 80 (1.4%) Native American, 75 (1.3%) Asian, 12 (0.2%) Pacific Islander, 326 (5.8%) from other races, and 193 (3.5%) from two or more races. Hispanic or Latino of any race were 733 persons (13.1%).

The Census reported that 5,575 people (99.9% of the population) lived in households, 4 (0.1%) lived in non-institutionalized group quarters, and 0 (0%) were institutionalized.

There were 2,119 households, out of which 752 (35.5%) had children under the age of 18 living in them, 1,291 (60.9%) were opposite-sex married couples living together, 206 (9.7%) had a female householder with no husband present, 93 (4.4%) had a male householder with no wife present. There were 155 (7.3%) unmarried opposite-sex partnerships, and 23 (1.1%) same-sex married couples or partnerships. 388 households (18.3%) were made up of individuals, and 138 (6.5%) had someone living alone who was 65 years of age or older. The average household size was 2.63. There were 1,590 families (75.0% of all households); the average family size was 2.98.

The population was spread out, with 1,400 people (25.1%) under the age of 18, 296 people (5.3%) aged 18 to 24, 1,413 people (25.3%) aged 25 to 44, 1,706 people (30.6%) aged 45 to 64, and 764 people (13.7%) who were 65 years of age or older. The median age was 41.2 years. For every 100 females, there were 97.2 males. For every 100 females age 18 and over, there were 95.8 males.

There were 2,597 housing units at an average density of 262.7 per square mile (101.4/km^{2}), of which 1,687 (79.6%) were owner-occupied, and 432 (20.4%) were occupied by renters. The homeowner vacancy rate was 6.1%; the rental vacancy rate was 8.2%. 4,274 people (76.6% of the population) lived in owner-occupied housing units and 1,301 people (23.3%) lived in rental housing units.

== Government ==
In the California State Legislature, Hidden Valley Lake is in the 2nd senatorial district, represented by Democrat Mike McGuire, and in the 4th Assembly district, represented by Democrat Cecilia Aguiar-Curry.

In the United States House of Representatives, Hidden Valley Lake is in California's 4th congressional district, represented by Democrat Mike Thompson.

Hidden Valley Lake (a.k.a. Hidden Valley Lake Association), as a CID or Homeowners Association, is a non-profit corporation under California law and is covered by the California Corporations Code and the Davis-Stirling Act. The former covers all functioning related to non-profit corporations, while the latter specifically covers homeowner associations (HOAs) in the state. There is no single state agency charged with regulating HOAs, i.e., no agency that is known to take an active role in addressing violations of the law within HOAs.
