= Lucerne, California =

Lucerne, California may refer to:

- Lucerne, Lake County, California
- Lucerne Valley, California
