= CKE (disambiguation) =

CKE may refer to:

- CKE Restaurants, an American fast food corporation
- Lampson Field, the IATA code CKE
- Chapman–Kolmogorov equation, used in Variational Bayesian methods
- Kaqchikel language, the ISO 639 code cke
- Cheras–Kajang Expressway, an expressway in Klang Valley, Malaysia
