= Clearlake Oaks, California =

- Census-designated place
- Location within Lake County and the state of California
- Coordinates: 39°01′35″N 122°40′19″W
- Country: United States
- State: California
- County: Lake

Area
  - Total: 2.15 sq mi (5.57 km^{2})
  - Land: 1.98 sq mi (5.12 km^{2})
  - Water: 0.17 sq mi (0.44 km^{2}) 6.55%
- Elevation: 1,335 ft (407 m)

Population (2020)
  - Total: 2,551
  - Density: 1,289.7/sq mi (497.94/km^{2})
- Time zone: UTC-8 (Pacific (PST))
  - Summer (DST): UTC-7 (PDT)
- ZIP code: 95423
- Area code: 707
- FIPS code: 06-13966
- GNIS feature ID: 1667849

Clearlake Oaks is a census-designated place (CDP) in Lake County, California, United States. It is located on the northeast of Clear Lake, 8 miles (13.8 km) northwest of the town of Clearlake, at an elevation of 1,335 feet (407 m). The population was 2,551 at the 2020 census, up from 2,359 at the 2010 census.

== History ==
The community was formerly named Stubbs and Clear Lake Oaks.

The site of the original town, inland of State Route 20, was subdivided by the 1920s. Situated in a broad canyon mouth, the original town site is about 4 blocks long and 3 deep, triangular in shape, with a plaza site in its center. Today the plaza is paved and used for parking by the church located along the west side. Most of the homes in the village remain true to their "fishing cottage" roots.

The Stubbs post office opened in 1926, and changed its name to Clearlake Oaks in 1935. The name Stubbs honored Charles Stubbs, a local landowner. The relocation of the post office, the aging population, and the coming of Wal-Mart have combined to kill the "downtown". In 1990, there were two markets, a chain hardware store, two gas stations, video store, salon, and several restaurants and bars. A privately operated marina had fish and ski boats for rent. But by the late nineties, Clearlake Oaks was down to one market, one convenience store, and a struggling antique store.

The park, beach, and pier were refurbished a few years back. As of 2007, the property next to the grocery store was being cleared and turned into a park, called Nylander Park after the owner of the local grocery store.

== Geography ==
According to the United States Census Bureau, the CDP has a total area of 2.1 square miles (5.4 km^{2}), of which 2.0 square miles (5.2 km^{2}) is land and 0.1 square miles (0.26 km^{2}) (6.55%) is water.

At the 2000 census, according to the United States Census Bureau, the CDP had a total area of 3.0 square miles (7.8 km^{2}), of which 3.0 square miles (7.8 km^{2}) was land and 0.1 square miles (0.26 km^{2}) (1.64%) was water.

== Demographics ==
Historical population
Census	Pop.	Note	%±
1980	1,610		—
1990	2,419		50.2%
2000	2,402		−0.7%
2010	2,359		−1.8%
2020	2,551		8.1%
U.S. Decennial Census; 1860–1870 1880-1890; 1900 1910 1920; 1930 1940 1950; 1960 1970 1980; 1990 2000 2010

=== 2020 census ===
As of the 2020 census, Clearlake Oaks had a population of 2,551. The population density was 1,289.7 inhabitants per square mile (498.0/km^{2}). The median age was 56.6 years. The age distribution was 12.3% under the age of 18, 4.5% aged 18 to 24, 19.2% aged 25 to 44, 30.3% aged 45 to 64, and 33.7% who were 65 years of age or older. For every 100 females, there were 107.7 males, and for every 100 females age 18 and over, there were 104.9 males age 18 and over.

96.4% of residents lived in urban areas, while 3.6% lived in rural areas.

The Census reported that all 2,551 people (100% of the population) lived in households. There were 1,272 households, out of which 15.3% had children under the age of 18. Of all households, 33.0% were married-couple households, 30.6% were households with a male householder and no spouse or partner present, and 27.6% were households with a female householder and no spouse or partner present. About 41.1% of all households were made up of individuals, and 21.4% had someone living alone who was 65 years of age or older. The average household size was 2.01. There were 632 families (49.7% of all households).

There were 1,800 housing units at an average density of 910.0 units per square mile (351.4 units/km^{2}), of which 1,272 (70.7%) were occupied and 528 (29.3%) were vacant. The homeowner vacancy rate was 3.5% and the rental vacancy rate was 5.4%. Of occupied units, 70.8% were owner-occupied and 29.2% were occupied by renters.

Racial composition as of the 2020 census
Race	Number	Percent
White	1,919	75.2%
Black or African American	83	3.3%
American Indian and Alaska Native	36	1.4%
Asian	50	2.0%
Native Hawaiian and Other Pacific Islander	2	0.1%
Some other race	163	6.4%
Two or more races	298	11.7%
Hispanic or Latino (of any race)	314	12.3%

=== Income and poverty ===
In 2023, the US Census Bureau estimated that the median household income was $38,669, and the per capita income was $40,721. About 18.8% of families and 24.1% of the population were below the poverty line.

=== 2010 census ===
The 2010 United States census reported that Clearlake Oaks had a population of 2,359. The population density was 1,115.2 inhabitants per square mile (430.6/km^{2}). The racial makeup of Clearlake Oaks was 2,054 (87.1%) White, 54 (2.3%) African American, 45 (1.9%) Native American, 34 (1.4%) Asian, 1 (0.0%) Pacific Islander, 60 (2.5%) from other races, and 111 (4.7%) from two or more races. Hispanic or Latino of any race were 192 persons (8.1%).

The Census reported that 2,359 people (100% of the population) lived in households, 0 (0%) lived in non-institutionalized group quarters, and 0 (0%) were institutionalized.

There were 1,178 households, out of which 183 (15.5%) had children under the age of 18 living in them, 429 (36.4%) were opposite-sex married couples living together, 132 (11.2%) had a female householder with no husband present, 67 (5.7%) had a male householder with no wife present. There were 91 (7.7%) unmarried opposite-sex partnerships, and 18 (1.5%) same-sex married couples or partnerships. 442 households (37.5%) were made up of individuals, and 249 (21.1%) had someone living alone who was 65 years of age or older. The average household size was 2.00. There were 628 families (53.3% of all households); the average family size was 2.57.

The population was spread out, with 323 people (13.7%) under the age of 18, 120 people (5.1%) aged 18 to 24, 350 people (14.8%) aged 25 to 44, 828 people (35.1%) aged 45 to 64, and 738 people (31.3%) who were 65 years of age or older. The median age was 54.9 years. For every 100 females, there were 98.9 males. For every 100 females age 18 and over, there were 97.7 males.

There were 1,823 housing units at an average density of 861.8 per square mile (332.7/km^{2}), of which 823 (69.9%) were owner-occupied, and 355 (30.1%) were occupied by renters. The homeowner vacancy rate was 5.9%; the rental vacancy rate was 9.8%. 1,535 people (65.1% of the population) lived in owner-occupied housing units and 824 people (34.9%) lived in rental housing units.

== Government ==
In the California State Legislature, Clearlake Oaks is in the 2nd senatorial district, represented by Democrat Mike McGuire, and in the 4th Assembly district, represented by Democrat Cecilia Aguiar-Curry.

Federally, Clearlake Oaks is in California's 4th congressional district, represented by Democrat Mike Thompson.
