= California's 4th congressional district =

U.S. House district for California

Coordinates: 38.3°N 119.7°W

- Interactive map of district boundaries
- Representative: Mike Thompson; D–St. Helena
- Population (2025): 769,911
- Median household income: $99,636
- Ethnicity: 51.3% White; 31.4% Hispanic; 7.6% Asian; 5.3% Two or more races; 2.8% Black; 1.6% other
- Cook PVI: D+17

California's 4th congressional district is a U.S. congressional district in California. The district is located in the northwestern part of the state, and includes all of Lake County and Napa County, most of Yolo County, and parts of Solano County and Sonoma County. Major cities in the district include Davis, Woodland, Napa, Vacaville, and most of Santa Rosa. The district is solidly Democratic, and is represented by Mike Thompson.

From 2013 to 2023, the district encompassed The Sierra from Truckee to the Sequoia National Forest, as well as a largely suburban area on the edge of the Sacramento Valley in southwestern Placer County. It consisted of Alpine, Amador, Calaveras, El Dorado, Mariposa, and Tuolumne counties plus most of Placer County and portions of Fresno, Madera, and Nevada counties. The district was represented by Republican Tom McClintock.

== Competitiveness ==
In 2006, Republicans had 48 percent of voter registrations, Democrats had 30 percent, and Libertarians had roughly 5 percent. A Democratic congressional candidate nearly won the district in 2008, losing by only half a percentage point and less than 1,600 votes, indicating that the district was much more competitive than it appeared to be.

New district boundaries for the 2012 elections shifted the population center to the south and east. Registered Democrats and Independents/Decline to State voters in the new district area outnumber registered Republicans by 12%. However, Republicans, Independents/Decline to State, and small third parties outnumber Democrats well over a 2 to 1 ratio. There were 183,800 Republicans, 117,300 Democrats, and 97,200 others. In presidential elections, Donald Trump won the district in 2016 with 54% of the vote and won in 2020 with 53.7% of the vote. In the 2018 and 2020 elections, the Republican candidate won over 53% of the vote.

In the 2020 redistricting, the district was shifted again to the San Francisco Bay Area, covering the bulk of what had been the 5th District. It includes all of Lake County and Napa County, most of Yolo County, and parts of Solano County and Sonoma County. Major cities in the district include Davis, Woodland, Napa, Vacaville, and most of Santa Rosa. The new 4th district is solidly Democratic, and is represented by Mike Thompson.

== Recent election results from statewide races ==
=== 2023–2027 boundaries ===
Year	Office	Results
2008	President	Obama 67% - 32%
2010	Governor	Brown 59% - 36%
2010	Lt. Governor	Newsom 57% - 34%
2010	Secretary of State	Bowen 58% - 33%
2010	Attorney General	Harris 51% - 39%
2010	Treasurer	Lockyer 61% - 31%
2010	Controller	Chiang 61% - 29%
2012	President	Obama 66% - 34%
2014	Governor	Brown 68% - 32%
2016	President	Clinton 64% - 29%
2018	Governor	Newsom 65% - 35%
2018	Attorney General	Becerra 66% - 34%
2020	President	Biden 67% - 30%
2022	Senate (Reg.)	Padilla 66% - 34%
2022	Governor	Newsom 63% - 37%
2022	Lt. Governor	Kounalakis 65% - 35%
2022	Secretary of State	Weber 65% - 35%
2022	Attorney General	Bonta 64% - 36%
2022	Treasurer	Ma 64% - 36%
2022	Controller	Cohen 61% - 39%
2024	President	Harris 64% - 33%
2024	Senate (Reg.)	Schiff 64% - 36%

== Composition ==
FIPS County Code	County	Seat	Population
33	Lake	Lakeport	68,878
55	Napa	Napa	133,216
95	Solano	Fairfield	449,218
97	Sonoma	Santa Rosa	481,812
113	Yolo	Woodland	220,544

Under the 2020 redistricting, California's 4th congressional district encompasses Lake, Napa, and Yolo Counties, and parts of Sonoma and Solano Counties. The area in Sonoma County includes the cities of Santa Rosa, Rohnert Park, Sonoma, Petaluma, and Cotati; and the census-designated places Boyes Hot Spring, El Verano, Penngrove, Sonoma State University, Kenwood, Glen Ellen, Eldridge, Fetters Hot Springs-Agua Caliente, and Temelec. The area in Solano County includes the cities of Vacaville, Dixon, and Rio Vista; and the census-designated places Hartley and Allendale.

Sonoma County is split between this district and the 2nd district. They are partitioned by Petaluma River, Highway 116, Redwood Highway, Robber Rd, Petersen Rd, Llano Rd, S Wright Rd, W College Ave, Jennings Ave, Administration Dr, Bicentennial Way, Cleveland Ave, Old Redwood Highway, Cross Creek Rd, Sonoma Highway, and Sonoma Creek.

Solano County is split between this district and the 8th district. They are partitioned by Soda Springs Rd, Union Pacific, Alamo Dr, Leisure Town Rd, Hawkins Rd, Bay Area Exxextric, Shilo Rd, Collinsville Rd, and Montezuma Slough.

=== Cities and CDPs with 10,000 or more people ===
- Santa Rosa – 178,127
- Vacaville – 102,386
- Napa – 77,480
- Davis – 66,850
- Woodland – 61,032
- Petaluma – 59,776
- West Sacramento – 53,519
- Rohnert Park – 44,390
- American Canyon – 21,837
- Dixon – 18,988
- Clearlake – 16,685
- Sonoma – 11,024
- Rio Vista – 10,217

=== 2,500 – 10,000 people ===
- University of California, Davis – 8,525
- Cotati – 7,584
- Winters – 7,195
- Hidden Valley Lake – 6,235
- Boyes Hot Springs – 6,215
- St. Helena – 5,438
- Calistoga – 5,228
- Lakeport – 5,026
- Penngrove – 4,172
- Fetters Hot Springs-Agua Caliente – 4,144
- El Verano – 3,867
- Yountville – 3,436
- Kelseyville – 3,382
- Clearlake Riviera (Kelseyville Riviera) – 3,410
- North Lakeport – 3,314
- Esparto – 3,108
- Lucerne – 3,067
- Esparto – 2,877
- Nice – 2,731
- Sonoma State University – 2,679
- Angwin – 2,633
- Clearlake Oaks – 2,551
- Hartley – 2,510

== Future composition ==
Beginning with the 2026 election, the 4th district will consist of the following counties:

- Colusa
- Lake (part)
- Napa
- Placer (part)
- Sacramento (part)
- Sonoma (part)
- Sutter
- Yolo (part)
- Yuba

== List of members representing the district ==
Member	Party	Dates	Cong ress	Electoral history	Counties
District created March 4, 1873
Sherman Otis Houghton (San Jose)	Republican	March 4, 1873 – March 3, 1875	43rd	Redistricted from the 1st district and re-elected in 1872. lost re-election.	Fresno, Inyo, Kern, Los Angeles, Mariposa, Merced, Mono, Monterey, San Bernardino, San Diego, San Luis Obispo, San Mateo, Santa Barbara, Santa Clara, Santa Cruz, Stanislaus, Tulare, Ventura
Peter D. Wigginton (Merced)	Democratic	March 4, 1875 – March 3, 1877	44th	Elected in 1875. Retired.	Fresno, Inyo, Kern, Los Angeles, Mariposa, Merced, Mono, Monterey, San Bernardino, San Diego, San Luis Obispo, San Mateo, Santa Barbara, Santa Clara, Santa Cruz, Stanislaus, Tulare, Ventura
Romualdo Pacheco (San Luis Obispo)	Republican	March 4, 1877 – February 7, 1878	45th	Lost contested election.	Fresno, Inyo, Kern, Los Angeles, Mariposa, Merced, Mono, Monterey, San Bernardino, San Diego, San Luis Obispo, San Mateo, Santa Barbara, Santa Clara, Santa Cruz, Stanislaus, Tulare, Ventura
Peter D. Wigginton (Merced)	Democratic	February 7, 1878 – March 3, 1879	45th	Won contested election. Retired.	Fresno, Inyo, Kern, Los Angeles, Mariposa, Merced, Mono, Monterey, San Bernardino, San Diego, San Luis Obispo, San Mateo, Santa Barbara, Santa Clara, Santa Cruz, Stanislaus, Tulare, Ventura
Romualdo Pacheco (San Luis Obispo)	Republican	March 4, 1879 – March 3, 1883	46th 47th	Elected in 1879. Re-elected in 1880. Retired.	Fresno, Inyo, Kern, Los Angeles, Mariposa, Merced, Mono, Monterey, San Bernardino, San Diego, San Luis Obispo, San Mateo, Santa Barbara, Santa Clara, Santa Cruz, Stanislaus, Tulare, Ventura
Pleasant B. Tully (Gilroy)	Democratic	March 4, 1883 – March 3, 1885	48th	Elected in 1882. Retired.	San Francisco
William W. Morrow (San Francisco)	Republican	March 4, 1885 – March 3, 1891	49th 50th 51st	Elected in 1884. Re-elected in 1886. Re-elected in 1888. Retired.	San Francisco
John T. Cutting (San Francisco)	Republican	March 4, 1891 – March 3, 1893	52nd	Elected in 1890. Retired.	San Francisco
James G. Maguire (San Francisco)	Democratic	March 4, 1893 – March 3, 1899	53rd 54th 55th	Elected in 1892. Re-elected in 1894. Re-elected in 1896. Retired.	San Francisco
Julius Kahn (San Francisco)	Republican	March 4, 1899 – March 3, 1903	56th 57th	Elected in 1898. Re-elected in 1900. Lost re-election.	San Francisco
Edward J. Livernash (San Francisco)	Democratic/ Union Labor	March 4, 1903 – March 3, 1905	58th	Elected in 1902. Lost re-election.	San Francisco
Julius Kahn (San Francisco)	Republican	March 4, 1905 – December 18, 1924	59th 60th 61st 62nd 63rd 64th 65th 66th 67th 68th	Elected in 1904. Re-elected in 1906. Re-elected in 1908. Re-elected in 1910. Re-elected in 1912. Re-elected in 1914. Re-elected in 1916. Re-elected in 1918. Re-elected in 1920. Re-elected in 1922. Re-elected in 1924. Died.	San Francisco
Vacant		December 18, 1924 – February 17, 1925	68th		San Francisco
Florence Prag Kahn (San Francisco)	Republican	February 17, 1925 – January 3, 1937	68th 69th 70th 71st 72nd 73rd 74th	Elected to finish husband's term. Re-elected in 1926. Re-elected in 1928. Re-elected in 1930. Re-elected in 1932. Re-elected in 1934. Lost re-election.	San Francisco
Franck R. Havenner (San Francisco)	Progressive	January 3, 1937 – December 30, 1937	75th 76th	Elected in 1936. Re-elected in 1938. Lost re-election.	San Francisco
Franck R. Havenner (San Francisco)	Democratic	December 30, 1937 – January 3, 1941	75th 76th	Elected in 1936. Re-elected in 1938. Lost re-election.	San Francisco
Thomas Rolph (San Francisco)	Republican	January 3, 1941 – January 3, 1945	77th 78th	Elected in 1940. Re-elected in 1942. Lost re-election.	San Francisco
Franck R. Havenner (San Francisco)	Democratic	January 3, 1945 – January 3, 1953	79th 80th 81st 82nd	Elected in 1944. Re-elected in 1946. Re-elected in 1948. Re-elected in 1950. Lost re-election.	San Francisco
William S. Mailliard (San Francisco)	Republican	January 3, 1953 – January 3, 1963	83rd 84th 85th 86th 87th	Elected in 1952. Re-elected in 1954. Re-elected in 1956. Re-elected in 1958. Re-elected in 1960. Redistricted to the 6th district.	San Francisco
Robert Leggett (Vallejo)	Democratic	January 3, 1963 – January 3, 1979	88th 89th 90th 91st 92nd 93rd 94th 95th	Elected in 1962. Re-elected in 1964. Re-elected in 1966. Re-elected in 1968. Re-elected in 1970. Re-elected in 1972. Re-elected in 1974. Re-elected in 1976. Retired.	1963–1967; Colusa, Glenn, Lake, Solano, Sutter, Yolo, Yuba
Robert Leggett (Vallejo)	Democratic	January 3, 1963 – January 3, 1979	88th 89th 90th 91st 92nd 93rd 94th 95th	Elected in 1962. Re-elected in 1964. Re-elected in 1966. Re-elected in 1968. Re-elected in 1970. Re-elected in 1972. Re-elected in 1974. Re-elected in 1976. Retired.	1967–1973; Colusa, Glenn, Lake, Sacramento (outside the city), Solano, Sutter, Yolo, Yuba
Robert Leggett (Vallejo)	Democratic	January 3, 1963 – January 3, 1979	88th 89th 90th 91st 92nd 93rd 94th 95th	Elected in 1962. Re-elected in 1964. Re-elected in 1966. Re-elected in 1968. Re-elected in 1970. Re-elected in 1972. Re-elected in 1974. Re-elected in 1976. Retired.	1973–1975; Colusa, Glenn, Solano, southwestern Sacramento, Sutter, Yolo, Yuba
Robert Leggett (Vallejo)	Democratic	January 3, 1963 – January 3, 1979	88th 89th 90th 91st 92nd 93rd 94th 95th	Elected in 1962. Re-elected in 1964. Re-elected in 1966. Re-elected in 1968. Re-elected in 1970. Re-elected in 1972. Re-elected in 1974. Re-elected in 1976. Retired.	1975–1983; Colusa, western Sacramento, Solano, Sutter, Yolo
Vic Fazio (West Sacramento)	Democratic	January 3, 1979 – January 3, 1993	96th 97th 98th 99th 100th 101st 102nd	Elected in 1978. Re-elected in 1980. Re-elected in 1982. Re-elected in 1984. Re-elected in 1986. Re-elected in 1988. Re-elected in 1990. Redistricted to the 3rd district.	1975–1983; Colusa, western Sacramento, Solano, Sutter, Yolo
Vic Fazio (West Sacramento)	Democratic	January 3, 1979 – January 3, 1993	96th 97th 98th 99th 100th 101st 102nd	Elected in 1978. Re-elected in 1980. Re-elected in 1982. Re-elected in 1984. Re-elected in 1986. Re-elected in 1988. Re-elected in 1990. Redistricted to the 3rd district.	1983–1993; Sacramento (outside the city), Solano, Yolo
John Doolittle (Roseville)	Republican	January 3, 1993 – January 3, 2009	103rd 104th 105th 106th 107th 108th 109th 110th	Redistricted from the 14th district and re-elected in 1992. Re-elected in 1994. Re-elected in 1996. Re-elected in 1998. Re-elected in 2000. Re-elected in 2002. Re-elected in 2004. Re-elected in 2006. Retired.	1993–2003; Alpine, Amador, Calaveras, El Dorado, Mono, Placer, northeastern Sacramento, Tuolumne
John Doolittle (Roseville)	Republican	January 3, 1993 – January 3, 2009	103rd 104th 105th 106th 107th 108th 109th 110th	Redistricted from the 14th district and re-elected in 1992. Re-elected in 1994. Re-elected in 1996. Re-elected in 1998. Re-elected in 2000. Re-elected in 2002. Re-elected in 2004. Re-elected in 2006. Retired.	2003–2013 Eastern Butte, El Dorado, Lassen, Modoc, Nevada, Placer, Plumas, Sacramento (Orangevale), Sierra
Tom McClintock (Elk Grove)	Republican	January 3, 2009 – January 3, 2023	111th 112th 113th 114th 115th 116th 117th	Elected in 2008. Re-elected in 2010. Re-elected in 2012. Re-elected in 2014. Re-elected in 2016. Re-elected in 2018. Re-elected in 2020. Redistricted to the 3rd district.	2003–2013 Eastern Butte, El Dorado, Lassen, Modoc, Nevada, Placer, Plumas, Sacramento (Orangevale), Sierra
Tom McClintock (Elk Grove)	Republican	January 3, 2009 – January 3, 2023	111th 112th 113th 114th 115th 116th 117th	Elected in 2008. Re-elected in 2010. Re-elected in 2012. Re-elected in 2014. Re-elected in 2016. Re-elected in 2018. Re-elected in 2020. Redistricted to the 3rd district.	2013–2023 Eastern central California including Lake Tahoe, Roseville, and Yosemite National Park
Mike Thompson (St. Helena)	Democratic	January 3, 2023 – present	118th 119th	Redistricted from the 5th district and re-elected in 2022. Re-elected in 2024. Lost re-election.	2023–2027 Lake, Napa, most of Yolo, parts of Solano and Sonoma
Eric Jones (Napa)	Democratic	Assuming office on January 3, 2027		Elected in 2026.	

== Election results for representatives ==
=== 1872 ===
1872 United States House of Representatives elections
Party	Candidate	Votes	%
Republican	Sherman Otis Houghton (Incumbent)	10,391	53.5
Democratic	Edward J. Kewen	9,012	46.5
Total votes		19,403	100.0
Turnout			
Republican hold			

=== 1874 ===
1874 United States House of Representatives elections
Party	Candidate	Votes	%
Democratic	Peter D. Wigginton	15,649	48.8
Republican	Sherman Otis Houghton (Incumbent)	11,090	34.6
Independent	J. S. Thompson	5,343	16.7
Total votes		32,082	100.0
Turnout			
Democratic gain from Republican			

=== 1876 ===
1876 United States House of Representatives elections
Party	Candidate	Votes	%
Republican	Romualdo Pacheco	19,104	50.0
Democratic	Peter D. Wigginton (Incumbent)	19,103	50.0
Total votes		38,207	100.0
Turnout			
Republican gain from Democratic			

=== 1878 ===
1878 United States House of Representatives elections
Party	Candidate	Votes	%
Republican	Romualdo Pacheco	15,391	40.5
Democratic	Wallace A. Leach	12,109	31.8
Workingman's	James J. Ayers	10,527	27.7
Total votes		38,027	100.0
Turnout			
Republican hold			

=== 1880 ===
1880 United States House of Representatives elections
Party	Candidate	Votes	%
Republican	Romualdo Pacheco (Incumbent)	17,768	45.8
Democratic	Wallace A. Leach	17,577	45.3
Greenback	J. F. Godfrey	3,435	8.9
Total votes		38,780	100.0
Turnout			
Republican hold			

=== 1882 ===
1882 United States House of Representatives elections
Party	Candidate	Votes	%
Democratic	Pleasant B. Tully	23,105	54.4
Republican	George Lemuel Woods	18,387	43.3
Populist	M. V. Wright	650	1.5
Prohibition	Isaac Kinley	355	0.8
Total votes		42,497	100.0
Turnout			
Democratic gain from Republican			

=== 1884 ===
1884 United States House of Representatives elections
Party	Candidate	Votes	%
Republican	William W. Morrow	15,083	58.8
Democratic	R. P. Hastings	10,422	40.6
Populist	H. S. Fitch	123	0.5
Prohibition	George Babcock	15	0.1
Total votes		25,643	100.0
Turnout			
Republican gain from Democratic			

=== 1886 ===
1886 United States House of Representatives elections
Party	Candidate	Votes	%
Republican	William W. Morrow (Incumbent)	11,413	48.6
Democratic	Frank McCoppin	9,854	42.0
Independent	Charles Allen Sumner	2,104	9.0
Prohibition	Robert Thompson	84	0.4
Total votes		23,455	100.0
Turnout			
Republican hold			

=== 1888 ===
1888 United States House of Representatives elections
Party	Candidate	Votes	%
Republican	William W. Morrow (Incumbent)	14,217	50.8
Democratic	Robert Ferral	13,624	48.6
Socialist	Frank M. Pixley	173	0.6
Total votes		28,014	100.0
Turnout			
Republican hold			

=== 1890 ===
1890 United States House of Representatives elections
Party	Candidate	Votes	%
Republican	John Tyler Cutting	13,196	49.2
Democratic	Robert Ferral	12,091	45.1
Socialist	Thomas V. Cator	1,492	5.6
Prohibition	Joseph Rowell	50	0.2
Total votes		26,829	100.0
Turnout			
Republican hold			

=== 1892 ===
1892 United States House of Representatives elections
Party	Candidate	Votes	%
Democratic	James G. Maguire	14,997	49.2
Republican	Charles O. Alexander	13,226	43.4
Populist	Edgar P. Burman	1,980	6.5
Prohibition	Henry Collins	296	1.0
Total votes		30,499	100.0
Turnout			
Democratic gain from Republican			

=== 1894 ===
1894 United States House of Representatives elections
Party	Candidate	Votes	%
Democratic	James G. Maguire (Incumbent)	14,748	48.3
Republican	Thomas B. Shannon	9,785	32.0
Populist	B. K. Collier	5,627	18.4
Prohibition	Joseph Rowell	388	1.3
Total votes		30,548	100.0
Turnout			
Democratic hold			

=== 1896 ===
1896 United States House of Representatives elections
Party	Candidate	Votes	%
Democratic	James G. Maguire (Incumbent)	19,074	61.0
Republican	Thomas B. O'Brien	10,940	35.0
Socialist Labor	E. T. Kingsley	968	3.0
Prohibition	Joseph Rowell	299	1.0
Total votes		31,281	100.0
Turnout			
Democratic hold			

=== 1898 ===
1898 United States House of Representatives elections
Party	Candidate	Votes	%
Republican	Julius Kahn	13,695	50.0
Democratic	James H. Barry	12,084	44.1
Socialist Labor	W. J. Martin	1,006	3.7
Independent	Joseph P. Kelly	594	2.2
Total votes		27,379	100.0
Turnout			
Republican gain from Democratic			

=== 1900 ===
1900 United States House of Representatives elections
Party	Candidate	Votes	%
Republican	Julius Kahn (Incumbent)	17,111	55.2
Democratic	R. Porter Ashe	11,742	37.8
Independent	C. C. O'Donnell	1,116	3.6
Socialist	G. B. Benham	969	3.1
Prohibition	Joseph Rowell	84	0.3
Total votes		31,022	100.0
Turnout			
Republican hold			

=== 1902 ===
1902 United States House of Representatives elections
Party	Candidate	Votes	%
Democratic	Edward J. Livernash	16,146	49.2
Republican	Julius Kahn (Incumbent)	16,005	48.7
Socialist	William Costley	616	1.9
Prohibition	Joseph Rowell	69	0.2
Total votes		16,836	100.0
Turnout			
Democratic gain from Republican			

=== 1904 ===
1904 United States House of Representatives elections
Party	Candidate	Votes	%
Republican	Julius Kahn	20,012	57.0
Democratic	Edward J. Livernash (Incumbent)	12,812	36.4
Socialist	William Costley	2,267	6.4
Total votes		35,091	100.0
Turnout			
Republican gain from Democratic			

=== 1906 ===
1906 United States House of Representatives elections
Party	Candidate	Votes	%
Republican	Julius Kahn (Incumbent)	5,678	62.4
Democratic	David S. Hirshberg	3,016	33.2
Socialist	Oliver Everett	399	4.4
Total votes		9,093	100.0
Turnout			
Republican hold			

=== 1908 ===
1908 United States House of Representatives elections
Party	Candidate	Votes	%
Republican	Julius Kahn (Incumbent)	9,202	52.7
Democratic	James G. Maguire	7,497	42.9
Socialist	K. J. Doyle	699	4.0
Prohibition	William N. Meserve	60	0.3
Total votes		17,458	100.0
Turnout			
Republican hold			

=== 1910 ===
1910 United States House of Representatives elections
Party	Candidate	Votes	%
Republican	Julius Kahn (Incumbent)	10,188	56.5
Democratic	Walter MacArthur	6,636	36.8
Socialist	Austin Lewis	1,178	6.5
Prohibition	E. F. Dinsmore	35	0.2
Total votes		18,037	100.0
Turnout			
Republican hold			

=== 1912 ===
1912 United States House of Representatives elections
Party	Candidate	Votes	%
Republican	Julius Kahn (Incumbent)	25,515	56.1
Democratic	Bert Schlesinger	14,884	32.7
Socialist	Norman W. Pendleton	5,090	11.2
Total votes		45,489	100.0
Turnout			
Republican hold			

=== 1914 ===
1914 United States House of Representatives elections
Party	Candidate	Votes	%
Republican	Julius Kahn (Incumbent)	41,044	69.1
Democratic	Henry Colombat	13,550	22.8
Socialist	Allen K. Gifford	3,928	6.6
Prohibition	J. C. Westenberg	895	1.5
Total votes		59,417	100.0
Turnout			
Republican hold			

=== 1916 ===
1916 United States House of Representatives elections
Party	Candidate	Votes	%
Republican	Julius Kahn (Incumbent)	51,968	77.2
Democratic	J. M. Fernald	10,579	15.7
Socialist	Allen K. Gifford	3,775	5.6
Prohibition	Henry W. Hutchinson	981	1.5
Total votes		67,303	100.0
Turnout			
Republican hold			

=== 1918 ===
1918 United States House of Representatives elections
Party	Candidate	Votes	%
Republican	Julius Kahn (Incumbent)	38,278	86.6
Socialist	Hugo Ernst	5,913	13.4
Total votes		43,191	100.0
Turnout			
Republican hold			

=== 1920 ===
1920 United States House of Representatives elections
Party	Candidate	Votes	%
Republican	Julius Kahn (Incumbent)	50,841	84.6
Socialist	Hugo Ernst	9,289	15.4
Total votes		60,130	100.0
Turnout			
Republican hold			

=== 1922 ===
1922 United States House of Representatives elections
Party	Candidate	Votes	%
Republican	Julius Kahn (Incumbent)	46,527	83
Socialist	Hugo Ernst	9,547	17
Total votes		56,074	100
Turnout			
Republican hold			

=== 1924 ===
1924 United States House of Representatives elections
Party	Candidate	Votes	%
Republican	Julius Kahn (Incumbent)	44,048	81
Socialist	William McDevitt	10,360	19
Total votes		54,408	100
Turnout			
Republican hold			

=== 1926 ===
1926 United States House of Representatives elections
Party	Candidate	Votes	%
Republican	Florence Prag Kahn (Incumbent)	37,353	63.4
Democratic	Chauncey F. Tramutulo	18,210	32.5
Socialist	Harry W. Hutton	2,960	5.1
Total votes		58,523	100.0
Turnout			
Republican hold			

=== 1928 ===
1928 United States House of Representatives elections
Party	Candidate	Votes	%
Republican	Florence Prag Kahn (Incumbent)	50,206	76
Independent	Harry W. Hutton	16,838	24
Total votes		67,044	100
Turnout			
Republican hold			

=== 1930 ===
1930 United States House of Representatives elections
Party	Candidate	Votes	%
Republican	Florence Prag Kahn (Incumbent)	47,397	100.0
Turnout			
Republican hold			

=== 1932 ===
1932 United States House of Representatives elections
Party	Candidate	Votes	%
Republican	Florence Prag Kahn (Incumbent)	67,425	85.3
Socialist	Milen C. Dempster	11,603	14.7
Total votes		79,028	100.0
Turnout			
Republican hold			

=== 1934 ===
1934 United States House of Representatives elections
Party	Candidate	Votes	%
Republican	Florence Prag Kahn (Incumbent)	50,491	48.0
Democratic	Chauncey Tramutolo	46,871	44.5
Progressive Party (US, 1924)	Raymond A. Burr	3,636	3.5
Socialist	Samuel S. White	2,414	2.3
Communist	Minnie Carson	1,810	1.7
Total votes		105,222	100.0
Turnout			
Republican hold			

=== 1936 ===
1936 United States House of Representatives elections
Party	Candidate	Votes	%
Progressive Party (US, 1924)	Franck R. Havenner	64,063	58.5
Republican	Florence Prag Kahn (Incumbent)	43,805	40.0
Communist	Anita Whitney	1,711	1.5
Total votes		109,579	100.0
Turnout			
Progressive Party (US, 1924) gain from Republican			

=== 1938 ===
1938 United States House of Representatives elections
Party	Candidate	Votes	%
Democratic	Franck R. Havenner (Incumbent)	64,452	61.2
Republican	Kennett B. Dawson	40,842	38.8
Total votes		105,294	100.0
Turnout			
Democratic hold			

=== 1940 ===
1940 United States House of Representatives elections
Party	Candidate	Votes	%
Republican	Thomas Rolph	75,369	54.6
Democratic	Franck R. Havenner (Incumbent)	61,341	44.4
Communist	Archie Brown	1,322	1.0
Total votes		138,032	100.0
Turnout			
Republican gain from Democratic			

=== 1942 ===
1942 United States House of Representatives elections
Party	Candidate	Votes	%
Republican	Thomas Rolph (Incumbent)	62,735	98.3
Communist	Archie Brown (write-in)	1,116	1.7
Total votes		63,851	100.0
Turnout			
Republican hold			

=== 1944 ===
1944 United States House of Representatives elections
Party	Candidate	Votes	%
Democratic	Franck R. Havenner	73,582	50.1
Republican	Thomas Rolph (Incumbent)	73,367	49.9
Total votes		146,949	100.0
Turnout			
Democratic gain from Republican			

=== 1946 ===
1946 United States House of Representatives elections
Party	Candidate	Votes	%
Democratic	Franck R. Havenner (Incumbent)	60,655	52.9
Republican	Truman R. Young	54,113	47.1
Total votes		114,768	100.0
Turnout			
Democratic hold			

=== 1948 ===
1948 United States House of Representatives elections
Party	Candidate	Votes	%
Democratic	Franck R. Havenner (Incumbent)	73,704	51.0
Republican	William S. Mailliard	68,875	47.7
Progressive	Francis J. McTernan Jr.	1,949	1.3
Total votes		144,528	100.0
Turnout			
Democratic hold			

=== 1950 ===
1950 United States House of Representatives elections
Party	Candidate	Votes	%
Democratic	Franck R. Havenner (Incumbent)	83,078	67.2
Republican	Raymond D. Smith	40,569	32.8
Total votes		123,647	100.0
Turnout			
Democratic hold			

=== 1952 ===
1952 United States House of Representatives elections
Party	Candidate	Votes	%
Republican	William S. Mailliard	102,359	55
Democratic	Franck R. Havenner (Incumbent)	83,748	45
Total votes		186,107	100
Turnout			
Republican gain from Democratic			

=== 1954 ===
1954 United States House of Representatives elections
Party	Candidate	Votes	%
Republican	William S. Mailliard (Incumbent)	88,439	61.2
Democratic	Philip A. O'Rourke	52,980	36.7
Progressive	George R. Andersen	2,987	2.1
Total votes		144,406	100.0
Turnout			
Republican hold			

=== 1956 ===
1956 United States House of Representatives elections
Party	Candidate	Votes	%
Republican	William S. Mailliard (Incumbent)	109,188	61.9
Democratic	James L. Quigley	67,132	38.1
Total votes		176,320	100.0
Turnout			
Republican hold			

=== 1958 ===
1958 United States House of Representatives elections
Party	Candidate	Votes	%
Republican	William S. Mailliard (Incumbent)	98,574	63.9
Democratic	George D. Collins Jr.	65,798	36.1
Total votes		164,372	100.0
Turnout			
Republican hold			

=== 1960 ===
1960 United States House of Representatives elections
Party	Candidate	Votes	%
Republican	William S. Mailliard (Incumbent)	118,249	65.3
Democratic	Phillips S. Davies	62,814	34.7
Total votes		181,063	100.0
Turnout			
Republican hold			

=== 1962 ===
1962 United States House of Representatives elections
Party	Candidate	Votes	%
Democratic	Robert L. Leggett	55,563	56.5
Republican	L. V. Honsinger	42,762	43.5
Total votes		98,325	100.0
Turnout			
Democratic win (new seat)			

=== 1964 ===
1964 United States House of Representatives elections
Party	Candidate	Votes	%
Democratic	Robert L. Leggett (Incumbent)	84,949	71.9
Republican	Ivan Norris	33,160	28.1
Total votes		118,109	100.0
Turnout			
Democratic hold			

=== 1966 ===
1966 United States House of Representatives elections
Party	Candidate	Votes	%
Democratic	Robert L. Leggett (Incumbent)	67,942	60
Republican	Tom McHatton	46,337	40
Total votes		114,279	100.0
Turnout			
Democratic hold			

=== 1968 ===
1968 United States House of Representatives elections
Party	Candidate	Votes	%
Democratic	Robert L. Leggett (Incumbent)	88,067	55.5
Republican	James Shumway	65,942	41.6
American Independent	Gene Clark	4,545	2.9
Total votes		158,554	100.0
Turnout			
Democratic hold			

=== 1970 ===
1970 United States House of Representatives elections
Party	Candidate	Votes	%
Democratic	Robert L. Leggett (Incumbent)	103,485	68
Republican	Andrew Gyorke	48,783	32
Total votes		152,268	100
Turnout			
Democratic hold			

=== 1972 ===
1972 United States House of Representatives elections
Party	Candidate	Votes	%
Democratic	Robert L. Leggett (Incumbent)	114,673	67.4
Republican	Benjamin Chang	55,367	32.6
Total votes		170,040	100.0
Turnout			
Democratic hold			

=== 1974 ===
1974 United States House of Representatives elections
Party	Candidate	Votes	%
Democratic	Robert L. Leggett (Incumbent)	100,934	100.0
Turnout			
Democratic hold			

=== 1976 ===
1976 United States House of Representatives elections
Party	Candidate	Votes	%
Democratic	Robert L. Leggett (Incumbent)	75,844	50.2
Republican	Rex Hime	75,193	49.8
Total votes		151,037	100.0
Turnout			
Democratic hold			

=== 1978 ===
1978 United States House of Representatives elections
Party	Candidate	Votes	%
Democratic	Vic Fazio	87,764	55.4
Republican	Rex Hime	70,733	44.6
Total votes		158,497	100.0
Turnout			
Democratic hold			

=== 1980 ===
1980 United States House of Representatives elections
Party	Candidate	Votes	%
Democratic	Vic Fazio (Incumbent)	133,853	65.3
Republican	Albert Dehr	60,935	29.7
Libertarian	Robert J. Burnside	10,267	5.0
Total votes		205,055	100.0
Turnout			
Democratic hold			

=== 1982 ===
1982 United States House of Representatives elections
Party	Candidate	Votes	%
Democratic	Vic Fazio (Incumbent)	118,476	63.9
Republican	Roger B. Canfield	67,047	36.1
Total votes		185,523	100.0
Turnout			
Democratic hold			

=== 1984 ===
1984 United States House of Representatives elections
Party	Candidate	Votes	%
Democratic	Vic Fazio (Incumbent)	130,109	61.4
Republican	Roger B. Canfield	77,773	36.7
Libertarian	Roger Conant Pope	4,039	1.9
Total votes		211,921	100.0
Turnout			
Democratic hold			

=== 1986 ===
1986 United States House of Representatives elections
Party	Candidate	Votes	%
Democratic	Vic Fazio (Incumbent)	128,364	70.2
Republican	Jack D. Hite	54,596	29.8
Total votes		182,960	100.0
Turnout			
Democratic hold			

=== 1988 ===
1988 United States House of Representatives elections
Party	Candidate	Votes	%
Democratic	Vic Fazio (Incumbent)	181,184	100.0
No party	Write-ins	1,306	0.0
Turnout			
Democratic hold			

=== 1990 ===
1990 United States House of Representatives elections
Party	Candidate	Votes	%
Democratic	Vic Fazio (Incumbent)	115,090	54.7
Republican	Mark R. Baughman	82,738	39.3
Libertarian	Bryce Bigwood	12,626	6.0
Total votes		210,454	100.0
Turnout			
Democratic hold			

=== 1992 ===
1992 United States House of Representatives elections
Party	Candidate	Votes	%
Republican	John Doolittle (Incumbent)	141,155	49.8
Democratic	Patricia Malberg	129,489	45.7
Libertarian	Patrick Lee McHargue	12,705	4.5
No party	Brooksher (write-in)	16	0.0
Total votes		283,265	100.0
Turnout			
Republican hold			

=== 1994 ===
1994 United States House of Representatives elections
Party	Candidate	Votes	%
Republican	John Doolittle (Incumbent)	144,936	61.33
Democratic	Katie Hirning	82,505	34.91
Libertarian	Damon C. Falconi	8,882	3.76
Total votes		236,323	100.0
Turnout			
Republican hold			

=== 1996 ===
1996 United States House of Representatives elections
Party	Candidate	Votes	%
Republican	John Doolittle (Incumbent)	164,048	60.5
Democratic	Katie Hirning	97,948	36.1
Libertarian	Patrick McHargue	9,319	3.4
Total votes		271,315	100.0
Turnout			
Republican hold			

=== 1998 ===
1998 United States House of Representatives elections
Party	Candidate	Votes	%
Republican	John Doolittle (Incumbent)	155,306	62.57
Democratic	David Shapiro	85,394	34.40
Libertarian	Dan Winterrowd	7,524	3.03
Total votes		248,224	100.0
Turnout			
Republican hold			

=== 2000 ===
2000 United States House of Representatives elections in California
Party	Candidate	Votes	%
Republican	John Doolittle (Incumbent)	197,503	63.5
Democratic	Mark A. Norberg	97,974	31.5
Libertarian	William Fritz Frey	9,494	3.0
Natural Law	Robert E. Ray	6,452	2.0
Total votes		311,423	100.0
Turnout			
Republican hold			

=== 2002 ===
2002 United States House of Representatives elections in California
Party	Candidate	Votes	%
Republican	John Doolittle (Incumbent)	139,280	64.9
Democratic	Mark A. Norberg	68,755	32.0
Libertarian	Allen M. Roberts	6,834	3.1
Total votes		214,869	100.0
Turnout			
Republican hold			

=== 2004 ===
2004 United States House of Representatives elections in California
Party	Candidate	Votes	%
Republican	John Doolittle (Incumbent)	221,926	65.4
Democratic	David I. Winters	117,443	34.6
Total votes		339,369	100.0
Turnout			
Republican hold			

=== 2006 ===
2006 United States House of Representatives elections in California
Party	Candidate	Votes	%
Republican	John Doolittle (Incumbent)	135,818	49.1
Democratic	Charlie Brown	126,999	45.9
Libertarian	Dan Warren	14,076	5.0
Total votes		213,984	100.0
Turnout			
Republican hold			

=== 2008 ===
2008 United States House of Representatives elections in California
Party	Candidate	Votes	%
Republican	Tom McClintock	184,543	50.3
Democratic	Charlie Brown	182,967	49.7
Total votes		367,510	100.0
Turnout			
Republican hold			

=== 2010 ===
2010 United States House of Representatives elections in California
Party	Candidate	Votes	%
Republican	Tom McClintock	186,392	61%
Democratic	Clint Curtis	95,653	31%
Green	Benjamin Emery	22,179	8%
Total votes		304,224	100%
Turnout			
Republican hold			

=== 2012 ===
United States House of Representatives elections, 2012
Party	Candidate	Votes	%
Republican	Tom McClintock (Incumbent)	197,803	61.1%
Democratic	Jack Uppal	125,885	38.9%
Total votes		323,688	100.0%
Republican hold			

=== 2014 ===
United States House of Representatives elections, 2014
Party	Candidate	Votes	%
Republican	Tom McClintock (Incumbent)	126,784	60.0%
Republican	Arthur "Art" Moore	84,350	40.0%
Total votes		211,134	100.0%
Republican hold			

=== 2016 ===
United States House of Representatives elections, 2016
Party	Candidate	Votes	%
Republican	Tom McClintock (Incumbent)	220,133	62.7%
Democratic	Robert W. Derlet	130,845	37.3%
Total votes		350,978	100.0%
Republican hold			

=== 2018 ===
2018 United States House of Representatives elections in California
Party	Candidate	Votes	%
Republican	Tom McClintock	184,401	54.1%
Democratic	Jessica Morse	156,253	45.9%
Total votes		340,654	100%
Turnout			
Republican hold			

In 2018, six Democratic candidates filed statements of candidacy with the Federal Election Commission (FEC). They were, in alphabetical order by last name: Regina Bateson; Roza Calderon; Richard Martin; Robert Lawton; Jessica Morse; and Rochelle Wilcox. Martin and Wilcox dropped out of the race, with Wilcox endorsing Morse in February.

Retired Air Force Lieutenant Colonel Charlie Brown, who was the Democratic nominee for this seat in 2006 and 2008, was "seriously considering" running in 2018, but decided in June 2017 against a third campaign. In January 2018, Brown endorsed Morse for the nomination. Bob Derlet, the Democratic nominee in 2016, also endorsed Morse in January.

On the Republican side, McClintock had one challenger, Mitchell Kendrick White, who filed with the FEC in January.

In February, the California Democratic Party (CDP) endorsed Jessica Morse in a contested nomination. Roza Calderon was able to successfully collect 322 CDP-credentialed delegate signatures needed to block the endorsement, in which Morse only received 44 delegate votes. However, CDP staff refused to accept the forms after it was alleged they closed doors early to prevent the submission. A petition was later filed with the Compliance Review Commission (CRC) by Calderon. The CRC voted to accept and count the signatures, ultimately disqualifying enough signatures to proceed with Morse's endorsement.

California allows candidates to include their professional description under their names on the ballot. Regina Bateson challenged Morse's ballot designation title of "National Security Fellow" at the Sacramento Superior Court after months of controversy that Morse was "fluffing" her credentials. California's Secretary of State, Alex Padilla, struck down Morse's three ballot designations before Judge Gevercer ruled that she presented "no credible evidence" to use the ballot designation of "National Security Fellow". Instead, he held that this title would mislead the average person about her recent activities. In the official Certified Candidate List for the primary election, Morse's ballot designation was left blank.

Under the California nonpartisan blanket ("jungle") primary system, only the two candidates with the most votes on June 5, regardless of party, went on to the general election on November 6. Two Republicans and four Democrats appeared on the primary ballot. Morse finished second, qualifying for the general election ballot, along with McClintock.

For the November ballot, Morse was also denied "National Security" as her designation. In the November general election, McClintock held the district with an advantage of more than eight percentage points.

=== 2020 ===
2020 United States House of Representatives elections in California
Party	Candidate	Votes	%
Republican	Tom McClintock (incumbent)	247,291	55.9
Democratic	Brynne S. Kennedy	194,731	44.1
Total votes		442,022	100.0
Republican hold			

=== 2022 ===
2022 United States House of Representatives elections in California
Party	Candidate	Votes	%
Democratic	Mike Thompson (incumbent)	176,900	67.8
Republican	Matt Brock	84,007	32.2
Total votes		260,907	100.0
Democratic hold			

=== 2024 ===
2024 United States House of Representatives elections in California
Party	Candidate	Votes	%
Democratic	Mike Thompson (incumbent)	227,730	66.5
Republican	John Munn	114,950	33.5
Total votes		342,680	100.0
Democratic hold			

== See also ==
- List of United States congressional districts
- California's congressional districts
