= Lake County, California =

County in California, United States

Coordinates: 39.09°N 122.76°W

Lake County
- County
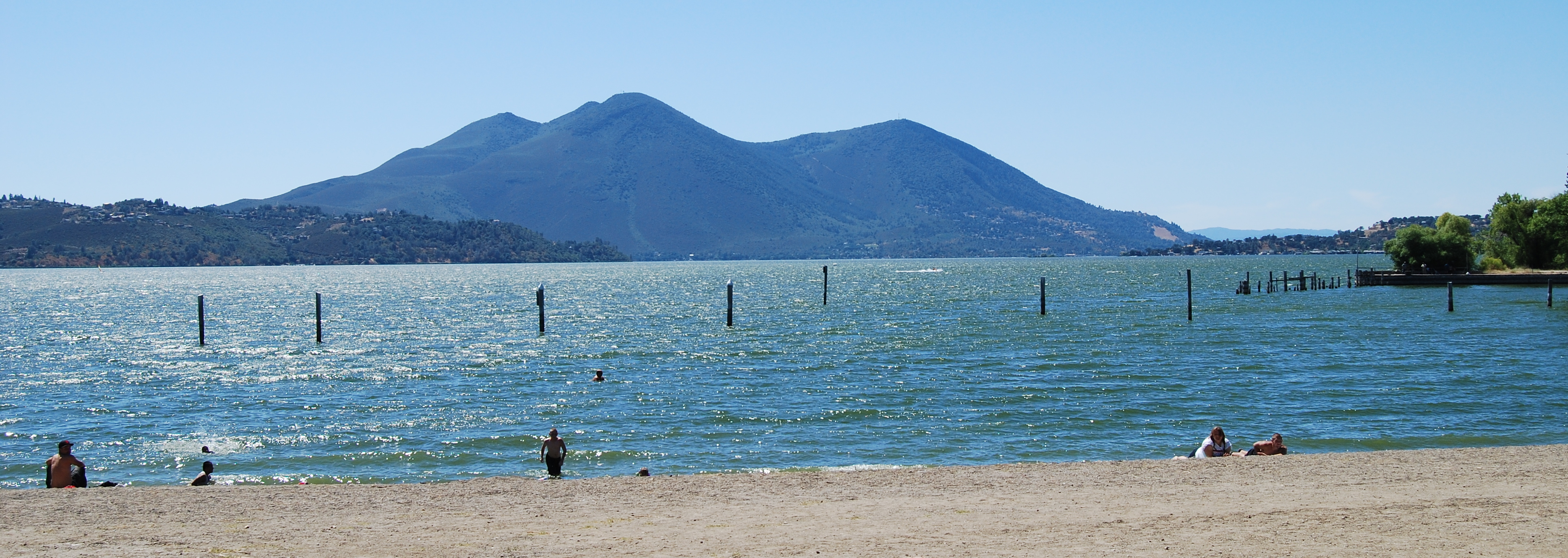
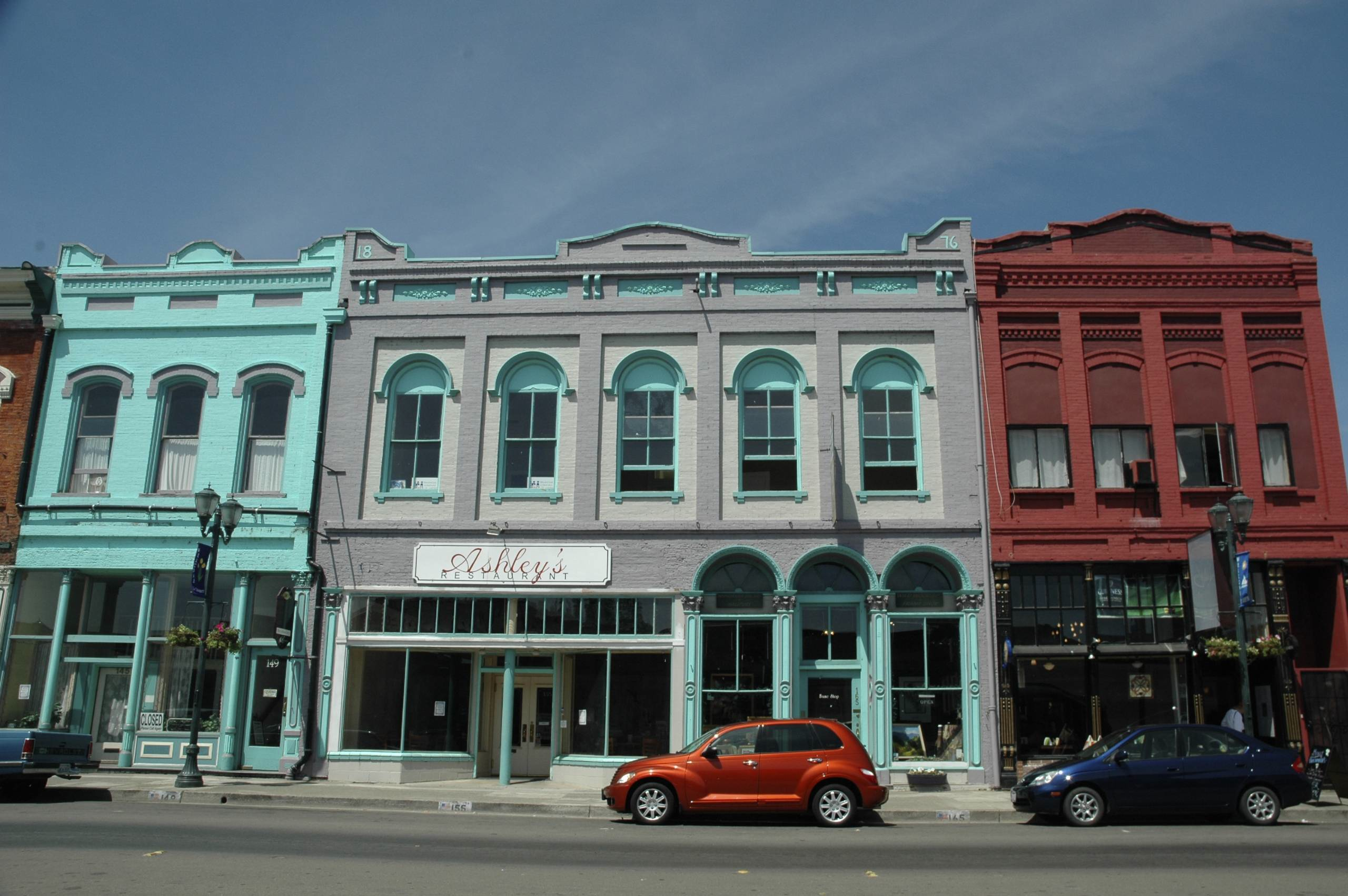
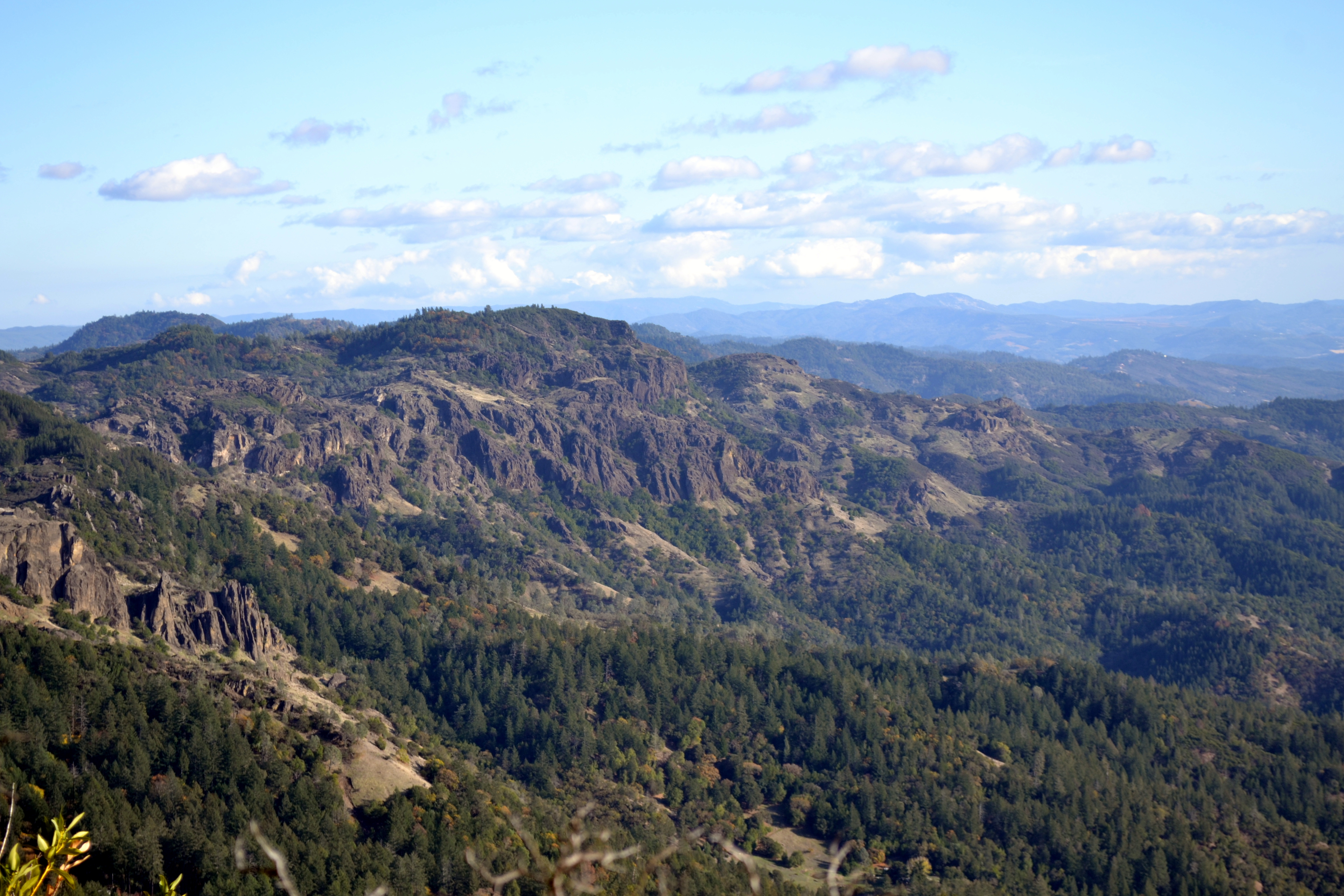
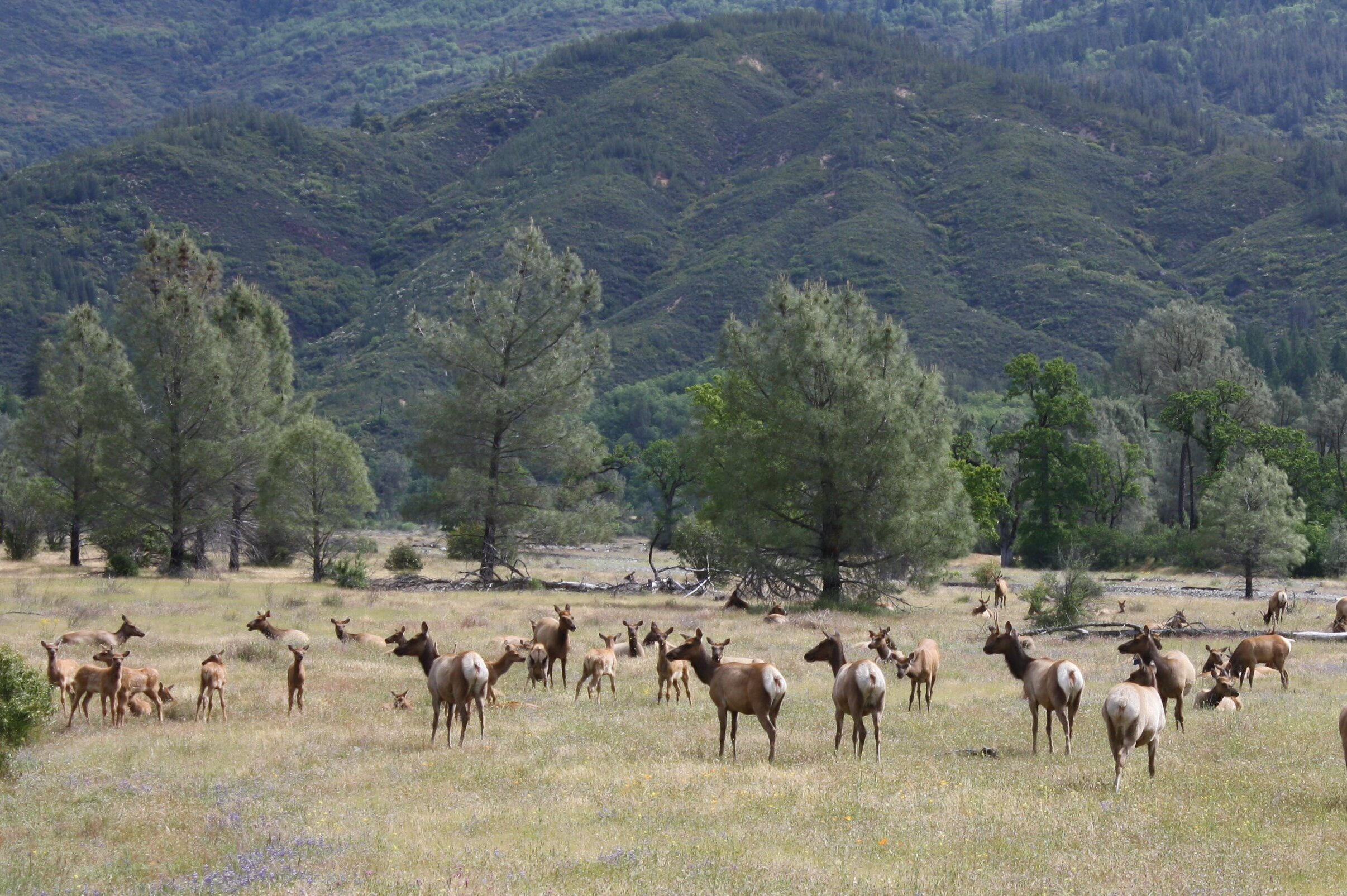
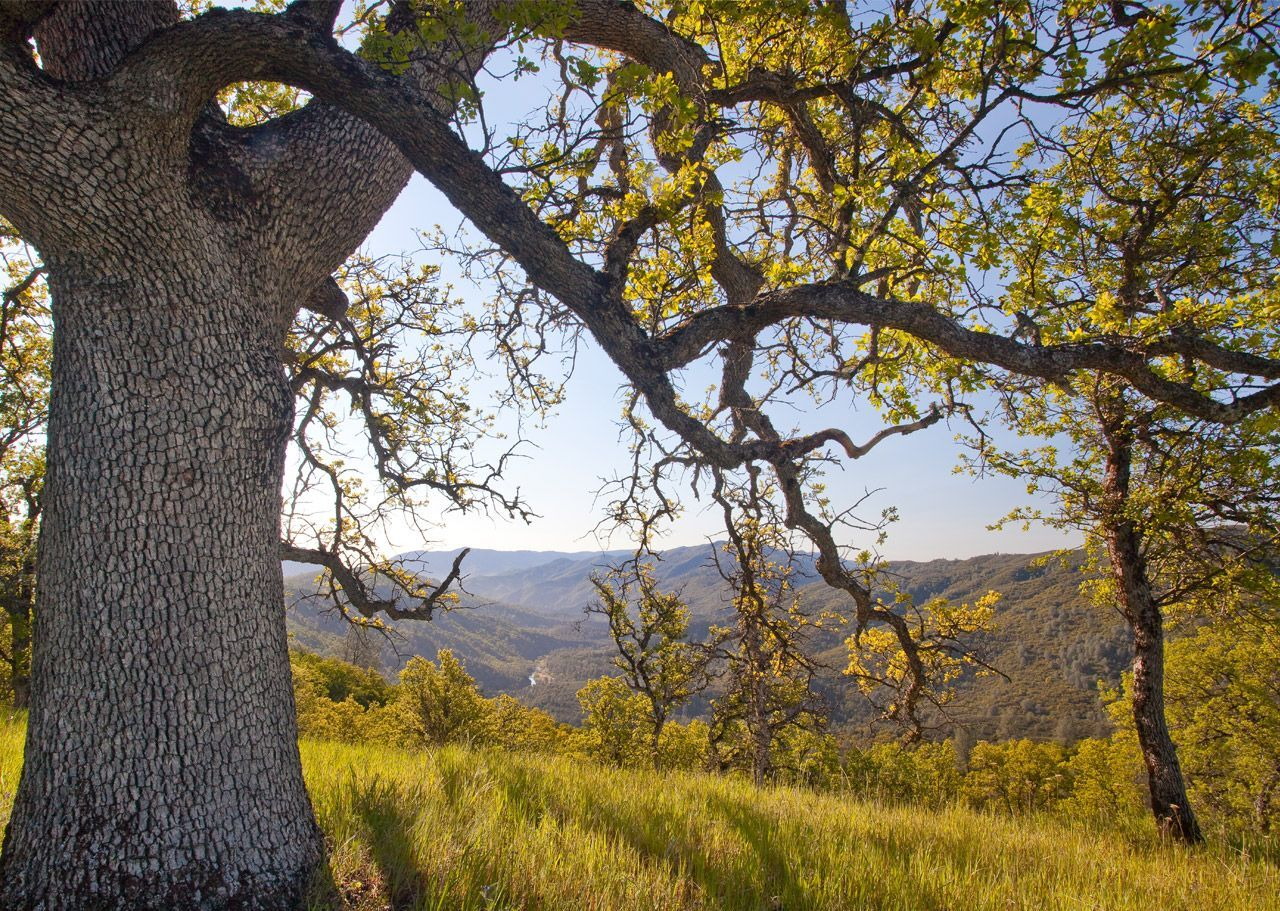
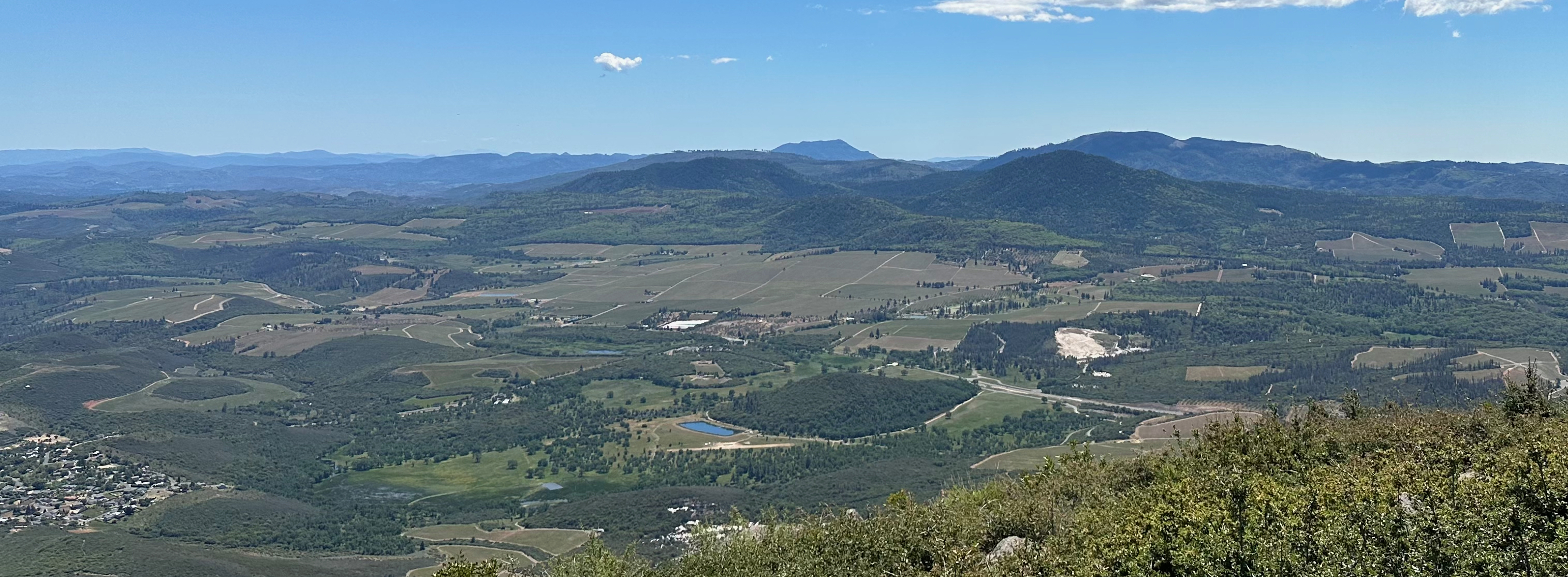
- Clear Lake and Mount Konocti Lakeport Mayacamas Mountains Mendocino Forest Cache Creek Red Hills Lake County AVA

- Flag Seal
- Interactive map of Lake County
- Location in the state of California
- Country: United States
- State: California
- Region: North Coast
- Incorporated: May 20, 1861
- Named for: Clear Lake
- County seat: Lakeport
- Largest city: Clearlake

Government
  - Type: Council–CAO
  - Body: Board of Supervisors
  - Chair: Brad Rasmussen
  - Vice Chair: Jessica Pyska
  - Board of Supervisors: Supervisors: Helen Owen; Bruno Sabatier; Eddie "EJ" Crandell; Brad Rasmussen; Jessica Pyska
  - County Administrative Officer: Susan R Parker

Area
  - Total: 1,329 sq mi (3,440 km^{2})
  - Land: 1,256 sq mi (3,250 km^{2})
  - Water: 73 sq mi (190 km^{2})
- Highest elevation: 7,059 ft (2,152 m)

Population (April 1, 2020)
  - Total: 68,163
  - Estimate (2025): 67,772 ▼
  - Density: 54.27/sq mi (20.95/km^{2})

GDP
  - Total: $2.274 billion (2022)
- Time zone: UTC−8 (Pacific Standard Time)
  - Summer (DST): UTC−7 (Pacific Daylight Time)
- Area code: 707
- FIPS code: 06-033
- GNIS feature ID: 277281
- Congressional district: 4th
- Website: https://www.lakecountyca.gov/

Lake County is a county located in the north central portion of the U.S. state of California. As of the 2020 census, the population was 68,163. The county seat is Lakeport. The county takes its name from Clear Lake, the dominant geographic feature in the county and the largest non-extinct natural lake wholly within California. (Lake Tahoe is partially in Nevada; the Salton Sea was formed by flooding; Tulare Lake was drained by the agricultural industry.)

Lake County forms the Clearlake, California micropolitan statistical area. It is directly north of the San Francisco Bay Area.

Lake County is part of California's Wine Country, which also includes Napa, Sonoma, and Mendocino counties. It includes nine American Viticultural Areas and around 20 bonded wineries.

== History ==
Lake County has been inhabited by Pomo Native Americans for over ten thousand years. Pomos had been fishermen and hunters, known especially for their intricate basketry made from lakeshore tules and other native plants and feathers. Pomo people continue to live in Lake County.

The area had European American settlers since at least the 1840s. Lake County was created in 1861 from parts of Napa and Mendocino counties. The eastern boundary of Lake County, which was not clearly specified in the 1861 act, was clarified by legislative acts passed in 1864 and 1868. A major effect of the 1868 act was to include in Lake County the entire watershed of North Fork Cache Creek, which had previously been claimed by Colusa County.

The 1911 California Blue Book lists the major crops as Bartlett pears and beans. Other crops include grain, alfalfa, hay, prunes, peaches, apples, grapes and walnuts. Stockraising included goats, hogs, turkeys and dairying.

Some vineyards were planted in the 1870s by European Americans, but the first in the state were established in the 18th century by Spanish missionaries. By the early 20th century, the area was earning a reputation for producing some of the world's greatest wines. However, in 1920, national prohibition essentially ended Lake County's wine production. With authorized cultivation limited to sacramental purposes, most of the vineyards were ripped out and replanted with walnut and pear orchards.

== Geography ==
According to the U.S. Census Bureau, the county has a total area of 1,329 square miles (3,440 km^{2}), of which 1,256 square miles (3,250 km^{2}) is land and 73 square miles (190 km^{2}), or 5.5%, is water. Two main watercourses drain the county: Cache Creek, which is the outlet of Clear Lake; and Putah Creek. Both of these flow to the Sacramento River. The main streams which flow into Clear Lake are Forbes Creek, Scotts Creek, Middle Creek, and Kelsey Creek. At the extreme north of the county Lake Pillsbury and the Van Arsdale Reservoir dam the Eel River, providing water and power to Ukiah in Mendocino County.

Clear Lake is believed to be the oldest warmwater lake in North America, due to a geological fluke. The lake sits on a huge block of stone which slowly tilts in the northern direction at the same rate as the lake fills in with sediment, thus keeping the water at roughly the same depth. The geology of the county is chaotic, being based on Franciscan Assemblage hills. Numerous small faults are present in the south end of the lake as well as many old volcanoes, the largest being Cobb Mountain. The geologic history of the county shows events of great violence, such as the eruption of Mount Konocti and Mount St. Helena and the collapse of Cow Mountain, which created the hills around the county seat of Lakeport. Blue Lakes, Lake Pillsbury, and Indian Valley Reservoir are the county's other major bodies of water.

Lake County has habitats for a variety of species of concern including the uncommon herb, Legenere limosa, the rare Eryngium constancei, and the tule elk. Waterfowl, bear, and other wildlife abound in the Clear Lake basin.

Due to its surrounding hilly terrain, Lake County is the only one of California's 58 counties never to have been served by a railroad line.

=== Adjacent counties ===
- Glenn County - northeast
- Colusa County - east
- Yolo County - southeast
- Napa County - southeast
- Sonoma County - southwest
- Mendocino County - west

=== National protected areas ===
- Mendocino National Forest (part)
- Cow Mountain Recreation Area
- Cache Creek Wilderness and Cache Creek Wildlife Area

In 2015, President Barack Obama created the Berryessa Snow Mountain National Monument, incorporating these and other areas.

=== State protected areas ===
- Boggs Mountain Demonstration State Forest
- Anderson Marsh State Historic Park
- Loch Lomond Vernal Pool Ecological Reserve
- Boggs Lake Ecological Reserve
- Clear Lake State Park
- Rodman Slough Preserve

=== Mineral springs ===
In the late 19th century, the worldwide popularity of mineral water for the relief of myriad physical ailments resulted in the development of mineral resorts around Clear Lake.

- Greene Bartlett discovered Bartlett hot springs in 1870. The springs were developed into a resort and by 1900 included a mineral water bottling plant. The resort burned down in 1934.
- Harbin Hot Springs was developed by settlers in the 1860s and burned to the ground in the Valley Fire of 2015. The resort partially reopened in January 2019, including the main pools and sauna, and a limited cafeteria service.
- Highland Springs opened in 1891 and was destroyed by fire in 1945. During its time, Highland had an elegant dining room and a spacious hotel.
- Saratoga Springs Resort was opened by J. J. Liebert in 1873 with several cabins, and within two decades had room for 350 guests.
- Witter Springs Resort opened in 1873 with a hotel and guest cottages.

== Climate ==
Lake County has a Mediterranean climate with hot summer daytime temperatures in its lower elevations. Nighttime temperatures remain cool year-round, somewhat moderating average temperatures and relieving the summer heat.

Climate data for Clearlake, California (1981–2010 normals)
Month	Jan	Feb	Mar	Apr	May	Jun	Jul	Aug	Sep	Oct	Nov	Dec	Year
Record high °F (°C)	76 (24)	81 (27)	84 (29)	94 (34)	101 (38)	114 (46)	113 (45)	112 (44)	111 (44)	104 (40)	92 (33)	78 (26)	114 (46)
Mean daily maximum °F (°C)	55 (13)	58 (14)	62 (17)	67 (19)	75 (24)	84 (29)	92 (33)	90 (32)	85 (29)	75 (24)	62 (17)	55 (13)	72 (22)
Mean daily minimum °F (°C)	32 (0)	34 (1)	36 (2)	39 (4)	45 (7)	51 (11)	55 (13)	53 (12)	49 (9)	42 (6)	35 (2)	32 (0)	42 (6)
Record low °F (°C)	8 (−13)	16 (−9)	17 (−8)	23 (−5)	28 (−2)	34 (1)	39 (4)	40 (4)	30 (−1)	21 (−6)	19 (−7)	6 (−14)	6 (−14)
Average precipitation inches (mm)	6.45 (164)	5.91 (150)	4.53 (115)	1.73 (44)	1.13 (29)	.22 (5.6)	.02 (0.51)	.10 (2.5)	.43 (11)	1.44 (37)	3.51 (89)	5.95 (151)	31.42 (798.61)

=== Air quality ===
Lake County has been ranked by the American Lung Association as having the cleanest air in the nation, including in 2013, 2014 and 2015. Lake County has also been ranked 24 times as having the cleanest air in California. Currently, the American Lung Association's website gives Lake County air a "C" grade for high ozone days and an "A" grade for particle pollution.

== Demographics ==
Historical population
Census	Pop.	Note	%±
1870	2,969		—
1880	6,596		122.2%
1890	7,101		7.7%
1900	6,017		−15.3%
1910	5,526		−8.2%
1920	5,402		−2.2%
1930	7,166		32.7%
1940	8,069		12.6%
1950	11,481		42.3%
1960	13,786		20.1%
1970	19,548		41.8%
1980	36,366		86.0%
1990	50,631		39.2%
2000	58,309		15.2%
2010	64,665		10.9%
2020	68,163		5.4%
2025 (est.)	67,772	▼	−0.6%
U.S. Decennial Census; 1790–1960 1900–1990; 1990–2000 2010 2020

=== 2020 census ===
As of the 2020 census, the county had a population of 68,163. The median age was 45.0 years. 20.7% of residents were under the age of 18 and 22.7% of residents were 65 years of age or older. For every 100 females there were 102.5 males, and for every 100 females age 18 and over there were 102.2 males age 18 and over.

The racial makeup of the county was 68.7% White, 1.8% Black or African American, 3.5% American Indian and Alaska Native, 1.5% Asian, 0.2% Native Hawaiian and Pacific Islander, 11.3% from some other race, and 13.1% from two or more races. Hispanic or Latino residents of any race comprised 22.7% of the population.

59.2% of residents lived in urban areas, while 40.8% lived in rural areas.

There were 27,622 households in the county, of which 26.3% had children under the age of 18 living with them and 27.0% had a female householder with no spouse or partner present. About 30.5% of all households were made up of individuals and 15.7% had someone living alone who was 65 years of age or older.

There were 34,220 housing units, of which 19.3% were vacant. Among occupied housing units, 67.5% were owner-occupied and 32.5% were renter-occupied. The homeowner vacancy rate was 2.2% and the rental vacancy rate was 5.7%.

=== Racial and ethnic demographics ===
Lake County, California – Racial and ethnic composition Note: the US Census treats Hispanic/Latino as an ethnic category. This table excludes Latinos from the racial categories and assigns them to a separate category. Hispanics/Latinos may be of any race.
Race / Ethnicity (NH = Non-Hispanic)	Pop 1980	Pop 1990	Pop 2000	Pop 2010	Pop 2020	% 1980	% 1990	% 2000	% 2010	% 2020
White alone (NH)	33,071	44,603	46,933	47,938	44,202	90.94%	88.09%	80.49%	74.13%	64.85%
Black or African American alone (NH)	348	924	1,209	1,186	1,158	0.96%	1.82%	2.07%	1.83%	1.70%
Native American or Alaska Native alone (NH)	806	998	1,413	1,530	1,737	2.22%	1.97%	2.42%	2.37%	2.55%
Asian alone (NH)	191	431	468	695	940	0.53%	0.85%	0.80%	1.07%	1.38%
Native Hawaiian or Pacific Islander alone (NH)	x	x	82	97	89	0.14%	0.15%	0.14%	0.15%	0.13%
Other race alone (NH)	68	42	52	107	386	0.19%	0.08%	0.09%	0.17%	0.57%
Mixed race or Multiracial (NH)	x	x	1,513	2,024	4,209	x	x	2.59%	3.13%	6.17%
Hispanic or Latino (any race)	1,882	3,633	6,639	11,088	15,442	5.18%	7.18%	11.39%	17.15%	22.65%
Total	36,366	50,631	58,309	64,665	68,163	100.00%	100.00%	100.00%	100.00%	100.00%

=== American Community Survey 2025 data ===
The United States Census Bureau estimated that in 2025, Lake County’s population was 67.772. It was also estimated that the county's population was 61,29% Non-Hispanic White, 27,58% Hispanic or Latino, 1,81% Non-Hispanic Black, 1,63% Asian, 2,53% Native American, 0,17% Pacific Islander, and 4,98% Multiracial.

Total	Population	Percentage
Non-Hispanic White	41.539	61,29%
Hispanic or Latino	18.690	27,58%
Non-Hispanic Black	1.226	1,81%
Asian	1.104	1,63%
Native American	1.718	2,53%
Pacific Islander	117	0,17%
Non-Hispanic Multiracial	3.378	4,98%

=== 2010 census ===
The 2010 United States census reported that Lake County had a population of 64,665. The racial makeup of Lake County was 52,033 (80.5%) White, 1,232 (1.9%) African American, 2,049 (3.2%) Native American, 724 (1.1%) Asian, 108 (0.2%) Pacific Islander, 5,455 (8.4%) from other races, and 3,064 (4.7%) from two or more races. Hispanic or Latino of any race were 11,088 persons (17.1%).

Population reported at 2010 United States census
The County	Total; Population	White	African; American	Native; American	Asian	Pacific; Islander	other races	two or more races	Hispanic or Latino (of any race)
Lake County	64,665	52,033	1,232	2,049	724	108	5,455	3,064	11,088
Incorporated city	Total; Population	White	African; American	Native; American	Asian	Pacific; Islander	other races	two or more races	Hispanic or Latino (of any race)
Clearlake	15,250	11,262	614	400	161	27	1,805	981	3,248
Lakeport	4,753	3,932	46	147	99	5	337	187	799
Census-designated place	Total; Population	White	African; American	Native; American	Asian	Pacific; Islander	other races	two or more races	Hispanic or Latino (of any race)
Clearlake Oaks	2,359	2,054	54	45	34	1	60	111	192
Clearlake Riviera	3,090	2,641	36	75	40	5	167	126	424
Cobb	1,778	1,625	14	31	13	1	26	68	113
Hidden Valley Lake	5,579	4,830	63	80	75	12	326	193	733
Kelseyville	3,353	2,213	22	51	32	2	888	145	1,337
Lower Lake	1,294	1,031	20	18	13	1	125	86	219
Lucerne	3,067	2,581	60	105	26	9	94	192	367
Middletown	1,323	985	5	28	18	0	225	62	413
Nice	2,731	2,187	65	159	42	7	123	148	384
North Lakeport	3,314	2,685	28	126	40	4	271	160	571
Soda Bay	1,016	843	16	14	12	0	102	29	171
Spring Valley	845	766	15	10	6	3	24	21	71
Upper Lake	1,052	842	7	33	7	0	104	59	242
Other unincorporated areas	Total; Population	White	African; American	Native; American	Asian	Pacific; Islander	other races	two or more races	Hispanic or Latino (of any race)
All others not CDPs (combined)	13,861	11,556	167	727	106	31	778	496	1,804

=== 2005 ===
There were a total of 34,031 homes in Lake County in 2005. This county has gone through a growth in housing units, adding a sum of 1,414 residential structures since 2001, a change of 4.3 percent. Lake County ranks 978 of 3,141, compared to change in residential structure growth in counties throughout the Unities States.

Lake County had a median home value in the year 2005 of $255,300, according to the American Community Survey. This median is less than the overall California 2005 home median value of $477,700 and greater than median home value of $167,500 for the rest of the nation in that year. In 2005, the American Community Survey reported that 14.4% of Lake County's owner-occupied dwellings are valued over a half a million dollars.

In the county, the population was spread out, with 24.1% under the age of 18, 6.0% from 18 to 24, 23.6% from 25 to 44, 26.8% from 45 to 64, and 19.5% who were 65 years of age or older. The median age was 43 years. For every 100 females there were 97.6 males. For every 100 females age 18 and over, there were 94.7 males.

The median income for a household in the county was $49,627, and the median income for a family was $55,818. Males had a median income of $45,771 versus $44,026 for females. The per capita income for the county was $43,825. About 6.9% of families and 4.6% of the population were below the poverty line, including 22.8% of those under age 18 and 7.3% of those age 65 or over. (Source: U.S. Census Bureau)

Within Lake County are two incorporated cities, the county seat of Lakeport and Clearlake, the largest city, and the communities of Kelseyville, Blue Lakes, Clearlake Oaks, Clearlake Park, Cobb, Finley, Glenhaven, Hidden Valley Lake, Clearlake Riviera, Loch Lomond, Lower Lake, Lucerne, Middletown, Nice, Spring Valley, Upper Lake, Whispering Pines, and Witter Springs.

Lake County is mostly agricultural, with tourist facilities and some light industry. Major crops include pears, walnuts and, increasingly, wine grapes.

=== 2000 census ===
According to official estimates based on the 2000 Census, 30% of housing units in Lake County were manufactured housing units. This was the highest percentage of any California county.

== Politics ==
=== Overview ===
In its early history, Lake County leaned Democratic in Presidential and congressional elections. It supported every Democratic presidential candidate between 1864 and 1916 except Alton B. Parker in his 1904 landslide defeat. Nonetheless, between 1920 and 1984 Lake County tended towards leaning Republican and was won by just four Democratic nominees – Franklin D. Roosevelt in 1932 and 1936, Lyndon B. Johnson in 1964 and Jimmy Carter in 1976. Ronald Reagan in 1984 won a majority in the county, which later reverted to leaning Democratic. In 2016, Republicans broke 40% of the vote for the first time since 2004, and Democrats failed to win 50% of the vote for the first time since 1996. Democrats broke 50% again in 2020, increasing their margin of victory, although Republicans still increased their percentage of the vote. In 2022, the county was won by Republicans in several statewide races. In 2024, Donald Trump won Lake County by 367 votes, marking the first time since Reagan's 1984 run that a Republican candidate won the presidential race in Lake County.

On November 4, 2008, Lake County voted 52.6% for Proposition 8, which amended the California Constitution to ban same-sex marriages. In November 2024, Proposition 3, titled Constitutional Right to Marry, which effectively repealed Proposition 8, received 57.04% of "Yes" votes in the county. In 2025, the county narrowly rejected Proposition 50 by a 50.1% to 49.9% margin.

United States presidential election results for Lake County, California
Year	Republican		Democratic		Third party(ies)	
Year	No.	%	No.	%	No.	%
1892	532	37.15%	644	44.97%	256	17.88%
1896	546	38.00%	854	59.43%	37	2.57%
1900	584	41.45%	746	52.95%	79	5.61%
1904	641	45.40%	594	42.07%	177	12.54%
1908	625	42.84%	628	43.04%	206	14.12%
1912	0	0.00%	1,118	51.86%	1,038	48.14%
1916	791	35.42%	1,164	52.13%	278	12.45%
1920	993	57.23%	571	32.91%	171	9.86%
1924	795	44.94%	261	14.75%	713	40.31%
1928	1,820	65.37%	926	33.26%	38	1.36%
1932	1,301	34.75%	2,344	62.61%	99	2.64%
1936	1,797	48.74%	1,837	49.82%	53	1.44%
1940	2,215	53.36%	1,897	45.70%	39	0.94%
1944	2,059	54.97%	1,671	44.61%	16	0.43%
1948	3,054	57.27%	1,999	37.48%	280	5.25%
1952	4,367	67.52%	2,038	31.51%	63	0.97%
1956	4,073	64.84%	2,185	34.78%	24	0.38%
1960	4,176	58.74%	2,897	40.75%	36	0.51%
1964	3,616	43.56%	4,680	56.37%	6	0.07%
1968	4,464	49.00%	3,777	41.46%	870	9.55%
1972	6,477	55.12%	4,715	40.13%	558	4.75%
1976	5,462	44.46%	6,374	51.88%	449	3.65%
1980	8,934	53.64%	5,978	35.90%	1,742	10.46%
1984	10,874	54.83%	8,648	43.61%	309	1.56%
1988	9,366	48.03%	9,828	50.39%	308	1.58%
1992	6,678	28.77%	10,548	45.44%	5,987	25.79%
1996	7,458	34.96%	10,432	48.90%	3,445	16.15%
2000	8,699	41.58%	10,717	51.23%	1,503	7.18%
2004	11,093	44.88%	13,141	53.16%	485	1.96%
2008	9,935	38.90%	14,854	58.16%	753	2.95%
2012	9,200	39.33%	13,163	56.27%	1,028	4.39%
2016	10,599	43.27%	11,496	46.93%	2,401	9.80%
2020	13,123	45.55%	14,941	51.86%	748	2.60%
2024	13,161	49.18%	12,794	47.81%	806	3.01%

Lake County is in California's 4th congressional district, represented by Mike Thompson (D–St. Helena).

In the state legislature, Lake is in the 4th Assembly district, represented by Democrat Cecilia Aguiar-Curry, and the 2nd senatorial district, represented by Democrat Mike McGuire.

=== Voter registration ===
Eligible and registered voters
Eligible	51,169	
Total registered voters	37,368	73.03%
Democratic	13,867	37.11%
Republican	11,953	31.98%
American Independent	2,321	6.21%
Green	318	0.85%
Libertarian	551	1.47%
Peace and Freedom	341	0.91%
Unknown	126	0.33%
Other	272	0.80%
No party preference	7,619	20.39%

== Crime ==
The table below includes the number of actual offenses (including attempts) as reported by the Lake County Sheriff's Office, and the rate per 1,000 persons for each type of offense (crime for the cities of Lakeport and Clearlake is not included, being listed in separate table further below).

Population and crime rates (2020)
Population	68,163	
Homicide	1	0.01
Rape	13	0.19
Robbery	11	0.16
Assault	612	8.97
Larceny	226	3.29
Burglary	239	3.50
Motor vehicle theft	5	0.07

Cities by population and crime (2019)
City	Population	Violent crimes	Violent crime rate per 1,000 persons	Murder and nonnegligent manslaughter	Rape	Robbery	Aggravated assault	Property crimes	Property crime rate per 1,000 persons	Burglary	Larceny-theft	Motor vehicle theft	Arson
Clearlake	15,400	119	7.72	1	19	36	63	460	29.87	146	210	104	11
Lakeport	4,959	34	6.85	0	3	7	24	160	32.26	29	110	21	0

CAL FIRE determined 8 wildfires in their jurisdiction in Lake County were caused by arson in 2023.

== Economy ==
The county's largest employers are the healthcare industry, Native American casinos, grocery stores, school districts, and electricity company Calpine, which operates in the Geysers geothermal field in the Mayacamas Mountains.

The only significant manufacturing operations in Lake County are Stokes Ladders in Kelseyville, which builds orchard and industrial ladders, and Reynolds Systems in Middletown, which specializes in detonators, igniters, precision initiating couplers, leads and boosters for the aerospace industry.

Lake County's economy is largely driven by agriculture. The main crops in 2022 were:

Crop	Production (tons)	Value	Bearing acres
Grapes (wine)	45,637	$84,756,086	10,987
Pears	16,371	$16,286,443	1,375.5
Walnuts	262	$239,959	3,485
Nursery production		$624,085	16
Vegetables (misc.)		$287,078	9
Cannabis (mixed light)		unknown	7.6
Cannabis (outdoor)		unknown	178

=== Wine Country ===
Lake County vineyards

The first vineyards in Lake County were planted in the late 19th century, but Prohibition and the county's remoteness dealt a blow to the area's viticulture. A reemergence of the wine industry began in the 1970s, although most of the region's grapes are still trucked to neighboring Napa, Sonoma and Mendocino counties for vinification. The county saw its vineyard acreage increase from fewer than 100 acres (40 ha) in 1965 to more than 11,000 acres (4,500 ha) in 2023

The region is host to nine American Viticultural Areas, notably Guenoc Valley, High Valley and the Red Hills, and about 20 winery operations.

== Transportation ==
=== Major highways ===
- State Route 20
- State Route 29
- State Route 53
- State Route 175
- State Route 281

There are also several numbered county routes in Lake County.

=== Public transportation ===
Lake Transit serves all areas around Clear Lake. Local routes serve Lakeport, Clearlake and Lower Lake. Connections are also provided to St. Helena (in Napa County) and Ukiah (in Mendocino County). Some routes operate on weekdays only; no service is provided on Sundays and observed public holidays.

=== Airports ===
Lampson Field (IATA: CKE, ICAO: LID, FAA LID: 1O2) is the county's public airport. A 4,000 foot (1,200 m) airstrip is located in Gravelly Valley, north of Lake Pillsbury. There are also several private airstrips located throughout the county. The county was once host to the Paul Hoberg Airport in the Cobb area, which by the early 1980s was considered abandoned.

=== Historical railroads ===
In 1888 the Vaca Valley and Clear Lake Railroad reached Rumsey, but the planned line to Clear Lake was never built. The Clear Lake Railroad started work on a line from Hopland to Lakeport: "In November 1911 first ground was broken for the Hopland-Clear Lake railroad to Hopland. Mrs Harriet Lee Hammond, wife of the president of the road started construction. ... There were six miles of track out of Hopland ...", but this was also abandoned.

== Culture ==
The Lake County Arts Council is the official arts council for Lake County, California, founded in 1981. It runs under the California Arts Council (CAC). The Lake County Arts Council runs the Main Street Gallery, a small gallery for visual arts with space for arts classes in Lakeport, Ca. This space is also used for the Lake County Arts Council's literary program, which hosts the county's Poetry Out Loud Program, recurring Writer's Circles, and more. In addition, the Lake County Arts Council has other events and programs including Art in Public Places, the Spring Dance Festival, and the Summer Youth Art Camp. The Lake County Arts Council also owns and operates the Soper Reese Theatre, Lake County's only fixed seating theatre located in Lakeport, California. The Soper Reese Theatre is a live performance venue that shows live theatrical shows, dance, live music, and has a Classic Cinema showing twice a month.

== Communities ==
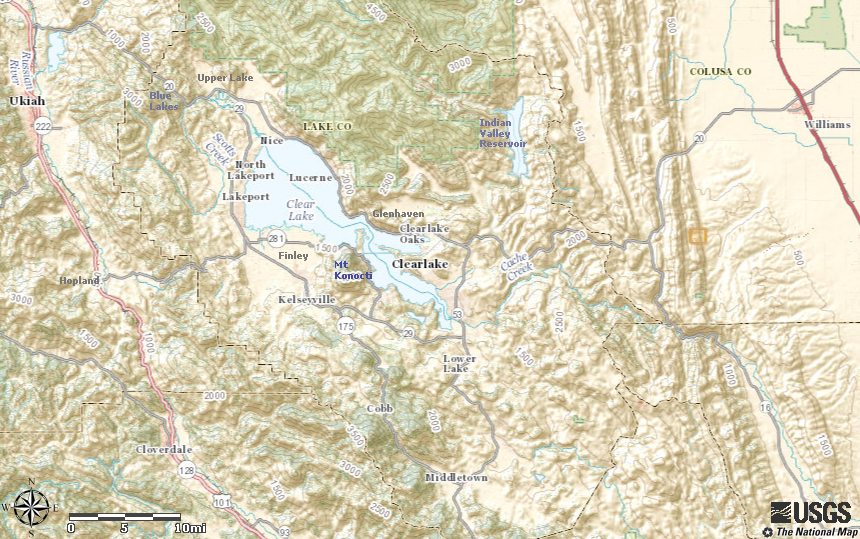
Topological map of central Lake County

=== Cities ===
- Clearlake
- Lakeport (county seat)

=== Census-designated places ===
- Clearlake Oaks
- Kelseyville Riviera★
- Cobb
- Hidden Valley Lake
- Kelseyville
- Lower Lake
- Lucerne
- Middletown
- Nice
- North Lakeport
- Soda Bay
- Spring Valley
- Upper Lake

★ As of 2022, the U.S. Census continues to use the community's former name of Clear Lake Riviera.

=== Unincorporated communities ===
- Finley
- Glenhaven
- Loch Lomond
- Parramore Springs
- Riviera Heights
- Riviera West
- Whispering Pines

=== Population ranking ===
The population ranking of the following table is based on the 2010 census of Lake County.

† county seat

Rank	City/Town/etc.	Municipal type	Population (2010 Census)
1	Clearlake	City	15,250
2	Hidden Valley Lake	CDP	5,579
3	† Lakeport	City	4,753
4	Kelseyville	CDP	3,353
5	North Lakeport	CDP	3,314
6	Clearlake Riviera	CDP	3,090
7	Lucerne	CDP	3,067
8	Nice	CDP	2,731
9	Clearlake Oaks	CDP	2,359
10	Cobb	CDP	1,778
11	Middletown	CDP	1,323
12	Lower Lake	CDP	1,294
13	Upper Lake	CDP	1,052
14	Soda Bay	CDP	1,016
15	Spring Valley	CDP	845
16	Robinson Rancheria (Pomo Indians)	AIAN	207
17	Big Valley Rancheria (Pomo Indians)	AIAN	139
18	Upper Lake Rancheria (Pomo Indians)	AIAN	87
19	Sulphur Bank Rancheria (Pomo Indians)	AIAN	61
20	Middletown Rancheria (Pomo Indians)	AIAN	56

== Notable people ==
- Benjamin Dewell, early settler and rancher
- Andrew Kelsey, who was killed in 1849 for his mistreatment of local Wappo and Pomo Indians
- Ellis O. Knox, first African American to be awarded a Ph.D. on the West Coast of the United States
- Lillie Langtry, British actress and royal mistress
- Jed Steele, winemaker

== See also ==
- Lake County wine
- Lampson Field Airport
- List of lakes of Lake County, California
- National Register of Historic Places listings in Lake County, California
