= North Lakeport, California =

- Unincorporated Community; Census Designated Place
- Location within Lake County and California
- Coordinates: 39°5′8″N 122°54′34″W
- Country: United States
- State: California
- County: Lake

Area
  - Total: 6.496 sq mi (16.825 km^{2})
  - Land: 3.796 sq mi (9.832 km^{2})
  - Water: 2.700 sq mi (6.993 km^{2}) 41.56%

Population (2020)
  - Total: 3,547
  - Density: 934.4/sq mi (360.8/km^{2})
- Time zone: UTC-8 (Pacific (PST))
  - Summer (DST): UTC-7 (PDT)
- Area code: 707
- FIPS code: 06-51990

North Lakeport is a census-designated place (CDP) in Lake County, California, United States. The population was 3,547 at the 2020 census, up from 3,314 at the 2010 census.

== Geography ==
According to the United States Census Bureau, the CDP has a total area of 6.5 square miles (17 km^{2}), of which 3.8 square miles (9.8 km^{2}) is land and 2.7 square miles (7.0 km^{2}) (41.56%) is water.

== Demographics ==
Historical population
Census	Pop.	Note	%±
2000	2,879		—
2010	3,314		15.1%
2020	3,547		7.0%
U.S. Decennial Census; 1860–1870 1880-1890; 1900 1910 1920; 1930 1940 1950; 1960 1970 1980; 1990 2000 2010

North Lakeport first appeared as a census designated place in the 2000 U.S. census.

=== 2020 census ===
As of the 2020 census, North Lakeport had a population of 3,547 and a population density of 934.4 inhabitants per square mile (360.8/km^{2}). The median age was 48.1 years. The age distribution was 19.4% under the age of 18, 6.9% aged 18 to 24, 21.4% aged 25 to 44, 26.3% aged 45 to 64, and 26.1% who were 65 years of age or older. For every 100 females, there were 94.7 males, and for every 100 females age 18 and over there were 93.7 males age 18 and over.

94.8% of residents lived in urban areas, while 5.2% lived in rural areas. The census reported that 99.7% of the population lived in households, 0.3% lived in non-institutionalized group quarters, and no one was institutionalized.

There were 1,488 households, of which 24.4% included children under the age of 18. Of all households, 42.1% were married-couple households, 10.2% were cohabiting couple households, 19.8% had a male householder with no spouse or partner present, and 27.8% had a female householder with no spouse or partner present. About 29.6% of households were one person, and 16.1% were one person aged 65 or older. The average household size was 2.38. There were 912 families (61.3% of all households).

There were 1,754 housing units at an average density of 462.1 units per square mile (178.4 units/km^{2}), of which 1,488 (84.8%) were occupied. Of the occupied units, 68.3% were owner-occupied and 31.7% were occupied by renters. Of all housing units, 15.2% were vacant. The homeowner vacancy rate was 1.5% and the rental vacancy rate was 6.7%.

Racial composition as of the 2020 census
Race	Number	Percent
White	2,561	72.2%
Black or African American	37	1.0%
American Indian and Alaska Native	108	3.0%
Asian	57	1.6%
Native Hawaiian and Other Pacific Islander	4	0.1%
Some other race	380	10.7%
Two or more races	400	11.3%
Hispanic or Latino (of any race)	801	22.6%

=== Income and poverty ===
In 2023, the US Census Bureau estimated that the median household income was $64,200, and the per capita income was $36,592. About 11.1% of families and 17.5% of the population were below the poverty line.

=== 2010 census ===
At the 2010 census North Lakeport had a population of 3,314. The population density was 505.9 inhabitants per square mile (195.3/km^{2}). The racial makeup of North Lakeport was 2,685 (81.0%) White, 28 (0.8%) African American, 126 (3.8%) Native American, 40 (1.2%) Asian, 4 (0.1%) Pacific Islander, 271 (8.2%) from other races, and 160 (4.8%) from two or more races. Hispanic or Latino of any race were 571 people (17.2%).

The whole population lived in households, no one lived in non-institutionalized group quarters and no one was institutionalized.

There were 1,414 households, 377 (26.7%) had children under the age of 18 living in them, 631 (44.6%) were opposite-sex married couples living together, 169 (12.0%) had a female householder with no husband present, 72 (5.1%) had a male householder with no wife present. There were 116 (8.2%) unmarried opposite-sex partnerships, and 10 (0.7%) same-sex married couples or partnerships. 436 households (30.8%) were one person and 198 (14.0%) had someone living alone who was 65 or older. The average household size was 2.34. There were 872 families (61.7% of households); the average family size was 2.92.

The age distribution was 717 people (21.6%) under the age of 18, 263 people (7.9%) aged 18 to 24, 697 people (21.0%) aged 25 to 44, 961 people (29.0%) aged 45 to 64, and 676 people (20.4%) who were 65 or older. The median age was 44.5 years. For every 100 females, there were 96.1 males. For every 100 females age 18 and over, there were 91.5 males.

There were 1,759 housing units at an average density of 268.5 per square mile, of the occupied units 952 (67.3%) were owner-occupied and 462 (32.7%) were rented. The homeowner vacancy rate was 4.6%; the rental vacancy rate was 11.7%. 2,183 people (65.9% of the population) lived in owner-occupied housing units and 1,131 people (34.1%) lived in rental housing units.

== Government ==
In the California State Legislature, North Lakeport is in the 2nd senatorial district, represented by Democrat Mike McGuire, and in the 4th Assembly district, represented by Democrat Cecilia Aguiar-Curry.

In the United States House of Representatives, North Lakeport is in California's 4th congressional district, represented by Democrat Mike Thompson.
