= Lake Transit =

Public transportation agency in Lake County, California

- Parent: Lake Transit Authority
- Headquarters: 9240 Hwy 53, Lower Lake
- Service type: bus service, paratransit
- Routes: 11
- Website: laketransit.org

Lake Transit is a bus agency providing fixed-route, flex-stop and curbside "Dial-a-Ride" bus service in Lake County, California. The agency also provides service to Ukiah in Mendocino County and St. Helena in northern Napa County.

The Lake Transit Authority, which governs the Lake Transit system, is composed of two members apiece from Clearlake and Lakeport city councils, the Lake County Board of Supervisors and two members at-large.

The system is funded by a combination of passenger fares, local transportation funds, state transit assistance funds, Federal Transit Act rural and inter-city grant funds, and service agreements with medical and community-based organizations.

Senate Bill 787 provided $1.5 million to construct a $2.1 million operations and maintenance facility that opened in 2004.

== Routes ==
Some routes operate on weekdays only: no service is provided on Sundays and observed public holidays.

Number	Route	Areas served	Notes
1	North Shore	South Clearlake, Clearlake, Clearlake Oaks, Glenhaven, Lucerne, Nice, Upper Lake, North Lakeport (Sutter Hospital)	
2	Highway 175	Kit's Corner, Cobb, Middletown	Weekdays only
3	Clearlake to St. Helena	South Clearlake, Lower Lake, Middletown, Calistoga, St Helena, Deer Park	
4	South Shore	South Clearlake, Lower Lake, Route 29 to Kit's Corner, Kelseyville, Lakeport	
4A	South Shore	Kit's Corner, Soda Bay, Kelseyville, Finley, Lakeport	Weekdays only
7	Ukiah	Lakeport, Nice, Upper Lake, Blue Lakes, Ukiah	
8	Lakeport	Kmart to North Lakeport (Sutter Hospital)	
10	Clearlake Park	Lower Lake, South Clearlake, Clearlake, Clearlake Park	
11	Clearlake; The Avenues Loop	South Clearlake, The Avenues, Clearlake	
12	Clearlake South Loop	Lower Lake, South Clearlake, Clearlake	

Clearlake is the central area of Clearlake, bounded by Lakeshore Drive, Olympic Drive and Old Highway 53.
Kit's Corner is at the junction of Route 29 and the south end of Soda Bay Road.
The Avenues are in Clearlake east of Highway 53.
Clearlake Park is north of Clearlake, near Borax Lake.
South Clearlake or Ray's Food Place which is a grocery store at the intersection of Route 53 and Dam Road.
Kmart is in South Lakeport, at the northern end of Soda Bay Road, near the intersection of routes 29 and 175
Sutter Hospital is in North Lakeport.

== Previous Routes ==
Number	Route	Areas served	Notes
5	Clearlake North	South Clearlake, The Avenues, Clearlake, Clearlake Park	Provided late night only service in Clearlake; Discontinued on November 23, 2015
