= Lucerne, Lake County, California =

Lucerne, California
- Census-designated place
- Location within Lake County and California
- Coordinates: 39°05′25″N 122°47′47″W
- Country: United States
- State: California
- County: Lake

Area
  - Total: 5.387 sq mi (13.952 km^{2})
  - Land: 5.373 sq mi (13.917 km^{2})
  - Water: 0.014 sq mi (0.035 km^{2}) 0.25%
- Elevation: 1,329 ft (405 m)

Population (2020)
  - Total: 3,266
  - Density: 607.8/sq mi (234.7/km^{2})
- ZIP code: 95458
- Area code: 707

Lucerne (formerly Clear Lake Beach, located in the area called Sikom by the Eastern Pomo) is a census-designated place (CDP) in Lake County, California, United States. Lucerne is located 7.25 miles (12 km) east-northeast of Lakeport, at an elevation of 1329 feet (405 m). The population was 235 in 1871, 3,067 at the 2010 census, and 3,266 at the 2020 census.

== Geography ==
According to the United States Census Bureau, the CDP has a total area of 5.4 square miles (14 km^{2}), of which over 99% is land.

At the 2000 census, according to the United States Census Bureau, the CDP had a total area of 19.5 square miles (51 km^{2}), of which 6.1 square miles (16 km^{2}) was land and 13.4 square miles (35 km^{2}) (68.67%) was water.

== Demographics ==
Historical population
Census	Pop.	Note	%±
1970	1,300		—
1980	1,767		35.9%
1990	2,011		13.8%
2000	2,870		42.7%
2010	3,067		6.9%
2020	3,266		6.5%
U.S. Decennial Census; 1860–1870 1880-1890; 1900 1910 1920; 1930 1940 1950; 1960 1970 1980; 1990 2000 2010

=== 2020 ===
The 2020 United States census reported that Lucerne had a population of 3,266. The population density was 607.9 inhabitants per square mile (234.7/km^{2}). The racial makeup of Lucerne was 72.1% White, 1.0% African American, 4.1% Native American, 2.1% Asian, 0.3% Pacific Islander, 8.2% from other races, and 12.2% from two or more races. Hispanic or Latino of any race were 18.2% of the population.

The census reported that 100.0% of the population lived in households, 1 person (0.0%) lived in non-institutionalized group quarters, and no one was institutionalized.

There were 1,398 households, out of which 20.8% included children under the age of 18, 32.4% were married-couple households, 11.4% were cohabiting couple households, 26.5% had a female householder with no partner present, and 29.7% had a male householder with no partner present. 38.4% of households were one person, and 20.2% were one person aged 65 or older. The average household size was 2.34. There were 722 families (51.6% of all households).

The age distribution was 18.6% under the age of 18, 7.1% aged 18 to 24, 23.3% aged 25 to 44, 27.6% aged 45 to 64, and 23.4% who were 65 years of age or older. The median age was 45.7 years. For every 100 females, there were 109.0 males.

There were 1,780 housing units at an average density of 331.3 units per square mile (127.9 units/km^{2}), of which 1,398 (78.5%) were occupied. Of these, 62.3% were owner-occupied, and 37.7% were occupied by renters.

In 2023, the US Census Bureau estimated that the median household income was $47,460, and the per capita income was $24,273. About 10.6% of families and 17.5% of the population were below the poverty line.

=== 2010 ===
The 2010 United States census reported that Lucerne had a population of 3,067. The population density was 614.9 inhabitants per square mile (237.4/km^{2}). The racial makeup of Lucerne was 2,581 (84.2%) White, 60 (2.0%) African American, 105 (3.4%) Native American, 26 (0.8%) Asian, 9 (0.3%) Pacific Islander, 94 (3.1%) from other races, and 192 (6.3%) from two or more races. Hispanic or Latino of any race were 367 persons (12.0%).

The Census reported that 3,032 people (98.9% of the population) lived in households, 35 (1.1%) lived in non-institutionalized group quarters, and 0 (0%) were institutionalized.

There were 1,372 households, out of which 308 (22.4%) had children under the age of 18 living in them, 454 (33.1%) were opposite-sex married couples living together, 183 (13.3%) had a female householder with no husband present, 78 (5.7%) had a male householder with no wife present. There were 165 (12.0%) unmarried opposite-sex partnerships, and 14 (1.0%) same-sex married couples or partnerships. 498 households (36.3%) were made up of individuals, and 235 (17.1%) had someone living alone who was 65 years of age or older. The average household size was 2.21. There were 715 families (52.1% of all households); the average family size was 2.81.

The population was spread out, with 554 people (18.1%) under the age of 18, 245 people (8.0%) aged 18 to 24, 593 people (19.3%) aged 25 to 44, 1,020 people (33.3%) aged 45 to 64, and 655 people (21.4%) who were 65 years of age or older. The median age was 48.5 years. For every 100 females, there were 100.5 males. For every 100 females age 18 and over, there were 98.8 males.

There were 1,833 housing units at an average density of 367.5 per square mile (141.9/km^{2}), of which 848 (61.8%) were owner-occupied, and 524 (38.2%) were occupied by renters. The homeowner vacancy rate was 3.8%; the rental vacancy rate was 8.0%. 1,736 people (56.6% of the population) lived in owner-occupied housing units and 1,296 people (42.3%) lived in rental housing units.

=== 1871 ===
In 1919 Edward W. Gifford was able to create a "remarkable" census of the village which the Eastern Pomo called Sikom, through the memory of Jim Pumpkin, who was able to recall "the names and kin relations of every house ... Sikom was made up of 20 dwellings, all but two of which were occupied by two, and sometimes four, families grouped around 48 fires. These 20 houses held a total of 235 individuals."

== Government ==
In the California State Legislature, Lucerne is in the 2nd senatorial district, represented by Democrat Mike McGuire, and in the 4th Assembly district, represented by Democrat Cecilia Aguiar-Curry.

In the United States House of Representatives, Lucerne is in California's 4th congressional district, represented by Democrat Mike Thompson.

Lucerne is in Lake County District 3, represented by supervisor E.J. Crandell.
