= Parramore Springs =

- Spring
- Location in California Parramore Springs (the United States)
- Coordinates: 39.3132861°N 122.8800177°W
- Country: United States
- State: California
- County: Lake County
- Elevation: 2,146 ft (654 m)

Parramore Springs (formerly Paramore Spring) is a spring in Lake County, California.

== Location ==
Parramore Springs is located 2.25 miles (3.6 km) east of Three Crossing. It is at an elevation of 2,146 feet (654 m).

== Spring ==
According to Gerald Ashley Waring, who visited the area around 1910,

Paramore Spring is situated on a branch of Rices Fork of Eel River, about 4 miles in a direct line northwest of Crabtree Springs. The spring is in a deep, brushy ravine and is not easily accessible, but the place has been visited occasionally by campers. It yields cool, strongly carbonated water, but it issues at the creek edge and is hence available only during periods of low water.

== Reference bibliography ==
- Durham, David L. (1998). California's Geographic Names: A Gazetteer of Historic and Modern Names of the State. Clovis, California: Word Dancer Press. p. 119. ISBN 1-884995-14-4.
- "Parramore Springs", Geographic Names Information System, United States Geological Survey, United States Department of the Interior
- Waring, Gerald Ashley (1915). Springs of California. U.S. Geological Survey Water Supply Paper. Vol. 338. U.S. Government Printing Office. doi:10.3133/wsp338.
