= Nice, California =

- Census-designated place
- Location within Lake County and California
- Coordinates: 39°07′24″N 122°50′54″W
- Country: United States
- State: California
- County: Lake

Area
  - Total: 1.731 sq mi (4.484 km^{2})
  - Land: 1.727 sq mi (4.472 km^{2})
  - Water: 0.0046 sq mi (0.012 km^{2}) 0.27%
- Elevation: 1,362 ft (415 m)

Population (2020)
  - Total: 2,929
  - Density: 1,696/sq mi (655.0/km^{2})
- Time zone: UTC-8 (Pacific (PST))
  - Summer (DST): UTC-7 (PDT)
- ZIP code: 95464
- Area code: 707
- FIPS code: 06-51294
- GNIS feature ID: 1659227

Nice is a census-designated place (CDP) in Lake County, California, United States. Nice is located 4.5 miles (7.2 km) southeast of Upper Lake, at an elevation of 1,362 feet (415 m). The population was 2,929 at the 2020 census, up from 2,731 at the 2010 census.

== History ==
The town was originally called Clear Lake Villas, until Charles William Bayne renamed the place after his former hometown, Nice, France, c. 1930. The Nice post office opened in 1930.

== Geography ==
According to the United States Census Bureau, the CDP has a total area of 1.7 square miles (4.4 km^{2}), all land.

== Demographics ==
Historical population
Census	Pop.	Note	%±
1990	2,126		—
2000	2,509		18.0%
2010	2,731		8.8%
2020	2,929		7.3%
U.S. Decennial Census; 1860–1870 1880-1890; 1900 1910 1920; 1930 1940 1950; 1960 1970 1980; 1990 2000 2010

Nice first appeared as a census designated place in the 1990 U.S. census.

=== 2020 census ===
As of the 2020 census, Nice had a population of 2,929 and a population density of 1,696.0 inhabitants per square mile (654.8/km^{2}). The median age was 48.4 years. The age distribution was 18.1% under the age of 18, 6.5% aged 18 to 24, 22.5% aged 25 to 44, 28.6% aged 45 to 64, and 24.4% aged 65 or older. For every 100 females, there were 106.7 males, and for every 100 females age 18 and over, there were 107.8 males age 18 and over.

Racial composition as of the 2020 census
Race	Number	Percent
White	2,014	68.8%
Black or African American	54	1.8%
American Indian and Alaska Native	155	5.3%
Asian	68	2.3%
Native Hawaiian and Other Pacific Islander	11	0.4%
Some other race	208	7.1%
Two or more races	419	14.3%
Hispanic or Latino (of any race)	507	17.3%

97.7% of residents lived in urban areas, while 2.3% lived in rural areas. The census reported that 99.5% of the population lived in households, 0.5% lived in non-institutionalized group quarters, and no one was institutionalized.

There were 1,261 households, of which 20.4% had children under the age of 18 living in them. Of all households, 32.9% were married-couple households, 11.8% were cohabiting couple households, 28.2% were households with a male householder and no spouse or partner present, and 27.1% were households with a female householder and no spouse or partner present. About 33.6% of all households were made up of individuals and 16.1% had someone living alone who was 65 years of age or older. The average household size was 2.31. There were 683 families (54.2% of all households).

There were 1,531 housing units at an average density of 886.5 units per square mile (342.3 units/km^{2}), of which 1,261 (82.4%) were occupied. Of occupied units, 63.0% were owner-occupied and 37.0% were occupied by renters. 17.6% of housing units were vacant. The homeowner vacancy rate was 2.9% and the rental vacancy rate was 6.4%.

=== Income and poverty ===
In 2023, the US Census Bureau estimated that the median household income was $70,274, and the per capita income was $35,379. About 7.0% of families and 12.8% of the population were below the poverty line.

=== 2010 census ===
At the 2010 census Nice had a population of 2,731. The population density was 1,580.9 inhabitants per square mile (610.4/km^{2}). The racial makeup of Nice was 2,187 (80.1%) White, 65 (2.4%) African American, 159 (5.8%) Native American, 42 (1.5%) Asian, 7 (0.3%) Pacific Islander, 123 (4.5%) from other races, and 148 (5.4%) from two or more races. Hispanic or Latino of any race were 384 people (14.1%).

The census reported that 2,719 people (99.6% of the population) lived in households, 6 (0.2%) lived in non-institutionalized group quarters, and 6 (0.2%) were institutionalized.

There were 1,234 households, 291 (23.6%) had children under the age of 18 living in them, 428 (34.7%) were opposite-sex married couples living together, 160 (13.0%) had a female householder with no husband present, 88 (7.1%) had a male householder with no wife present. There were 147 (11.9%) unmarried opposite-sex partnerships, and 12 (1.0%) same-sex married couples or partnerships. 437 households (35.4%) were one person and 165 (13.4%) had someone living alone who was 65 or older. The average household size was 2.20. There were 676 families (54.8% of households); the average family size was 2.79.

The age distribution was 505 people (18.5%) under the age of 18, 238 people (8.7%) aged 18 to 24, 549 people (20.1%) aged 25 to 44, 926 people (33.9%) aged 45 to 64, and 513 people (18.8%) who were 65 or older. The median age was 46.6 years. For every 100 females, there were 99.2 males. For every 100 females age 18 and over, there were 98.9 males.

There were 1,652 housing units at an average density of 956.3 per square mile, of the occupied units 711 (57.6%) were owner-occupied and 523 (42.4%) were rented. The homeowner vacancy rate was 2.7%; the rental vacancy rate was 7.6%. 1,489 people (54.5% of the population) lived in owner-occupied housing units and 1,230 people (45.0%) lived in rental housing units.

== Government ==
In the California State Legislature, Nice is in the 2nd senatorial district, represented by Democrat Mike McGuire, and in the 4th Assembly district, represented by Democrat Cecilia Aguiar-Curry.

In the United States House of Representatives, Nice is in California's 4th congressional district, represented by Democrat Mike Thompson.
