= Kelseyville Riviera, California =

Kelseyville Riviera Clear Lake Riviera
- Census-designated place
- Location of Kelseyville Riviera / Clearlake Riviera CDP in Lake County, California

- Location in California
- Coordinates: 38°57′15″N 122°43′15″W
- Country: United States
- State: California
- County: Lake

Area
  - Total: 5.29 sq mi (13.70 km^{2})
  - Land: 5.29 sq mi (13.70 km^{2})
  - Water: 0 sq mi (0.00 km^{2}) 0.03%
- Elevation: 1,755 ft (535 m)

Population (2020)
  - Total: 3,410
  - Density: 644.8/sq mi (248.97/km^{2})
- Time zone: UTC-8 (Pacific (PST))
  - Summer (DST): UTC-7 (PDT)
- Area code: 707
- GNIS feature IDs: 1766164

Kelseyville Riviera is a planned community in Lake County, California, United States. In 2021, its name was changed from Clear Lake Riviera by its homeowners association. The population was 3,410 at the 2020 census.

== Geography ==
According to the United States Census Bureau, the CDP has a total area of 5.29 square miles (13.7 km^{2}), over 99% land. It lies at an elevation of 1,755 feet (535 m).

== Demographics ==
Historical population
Census	Pop.	Note	%±
2010	3,090		—
2020	3,410		10.4%
U.S. Decennial Census; 1850–1870 1880-1890; 1900 1910 1920; 1930 1940 1950; 1960 1970 1980; 1990 2000 2010; 2020

The community first appeared as a census designated place in the 2010 U.S. census under the name Clearlake Riviera.

Clearlake Rivera CDP, California – Racial and ethnic composition Note: the US Census treats Hispanic/Latino as an ethnic category. This table excludes Latinos from the racial categories and assigns them to a separate category. Hispanics/Latinos may be of any race.
Race / Ethnicity (NH = Non-Hispanic)	Pop 2010	Pop 2020	% 2010	% 2020
White alone (NH)	2,442	2,370	79.03%	69.50%
Black or African American alone (NH)	36	60	1.17%	1.76%
Native American or Alaska Native alone (NH)	45	41	1.46%	1.20%
Asian alone (NH)	39	44	1.26%	1.29%
Pacific Islander alone (NH)	5	5	0.16%	0.15%
Some Other Race alone (NH)	11	21	0.36%	0.62%
Mixed Race or Multi-Racial (NH)	88	218	2.85%	6.39%
Hispanic or Latino (any race)	424	651	13.72%	19.09%
Total	3,090	3,410	100.00%	100.00%

The 2020 United States census reported that Clearlake Riviera had a population of 3,410. The population density was 644.9 inhabitants per square mile (249.0/km^{2}). The racial makeup of Clearlake Riviera was 74.8% White, 1.8% African American, 2.4% Native American, 1.5% Asian, 0.1% Pacific Islander, 6.5% from other races, and 12.8% from two or more races. Hispanic or Latino of any race were 19.1% of the population.

The whole population lived in households. There were 1,355 households, out of which 26.1% included children under the age of 18, 45.7% were married-couple households, 11.0% were cohabiting couple households, 22.2% had a female householder with no partner present, and 21.1% had a male householder with no partner present. 24.7% of households were one person, and 13.9% were one person aged 65 or older. The average household size was 2.52. There were 864 families (63.8% of all households).

The age distribution was 21.2% under the age of 18, 5.6% aged 18 to 24, 24.5% aged 25 to 44, 26.5% aged 45 to 64, and 22.2% who were 65 years of age or older. The median age was 44.2 years. For every 100 females, there were 95.3 males.

There were 1,582 housing units at an average density of 299.2 units per square mile (115.5 units/km^{2}), of which 1,355 (85.7%) were occupied. Of these, 72.8% were owner-occupied, and 27.2% were occupied by renters.

== Home hardening ==
In 2023, the community was selected by CAL FIRE and Cal OES for a home hardening pilot program driven by regional non-governmental organization North Coast Opportunities.
