= Lampson Field =

- IATA: CKE; ICAO: none; FAA LID: 1O2

Summary
- Airport type: Public
- Owner: Lake County
- Operator: Lake County Public Works
- Location: Lake County, California
- Elevation AMSL: 1,380 ft / 421 m
- Coordinates: 38°59′26″N 122°54′02″W
- Website: https://www.lakecountyca.gov/732/Airport
- Interactive map of Lampson Field

Runways
Direction	Length		Surface
Direction	ft	m	Surface
10/28	3,597	1,096	Asphalt

Lampson Field (IATA: CKE, FAA LID: 1O2) is a public airport located three miles (4.8 km) south of the town of Lakeport, in Lake County, California, United States.

Features of the airport include 4.0 degree precision approach path indicator (PAPI) lights on runway 28, pilot-controlled lighting, and an automated weather observing system (AWOS).

The airport covers 68 acres (28 ha) and has one double-sided runway.

== See also ==
- List of airports in California
