= Cecilia Aguiar-Curry =

American politician (born 1954)

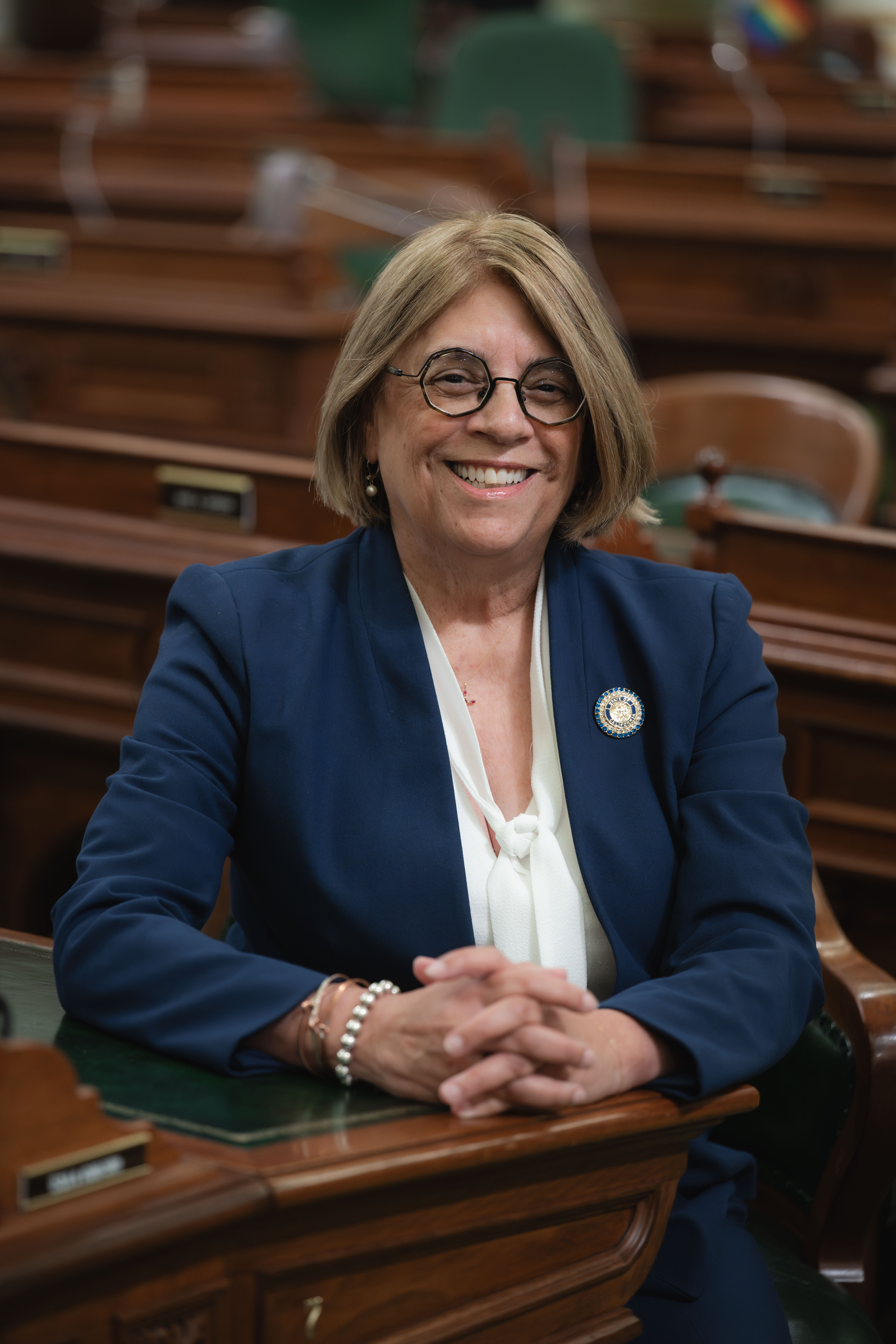
- Official portrait, 2024

Majority Leader of the California Assembly
- Incumbent
- Assumed office November 22, 2023
- Preceded by: Isaac Bryan

Speaker pro tempore of the California State Assembly
- In office July 3, 2023 – November 22, 2023
- Preceded by: Chris Ward
- Succeeded by: Jim Wood

Member of the California State Assembly from the 4th district
- Incumbent
- Assumed office December 5, 2016
- Preceded by: Bill Dodd

Personal details
- Born: September 29, 1954 (age 71)
- Party: Democratic
- Education: San Jose State University (BA)

Cecilia Aguiar-Curry (born September 25, 1954) is an American politician serving as the majority leader of the California State Assembly since 2023. A member of the Democratic Party, she has represented the 4th Assembly District since 2016.

== Biography ==
Cecilia grew up in western Yolo County. She went to San Jose State University and earned her degree in business administration. After going to school and working in the Bay Area for several years, she moved back to her hometown of Winters. She is a co-owner of her family's walnut farm in Yolo County. Prior to her election to the State Assembly, she was the first female Mayor of Winters.

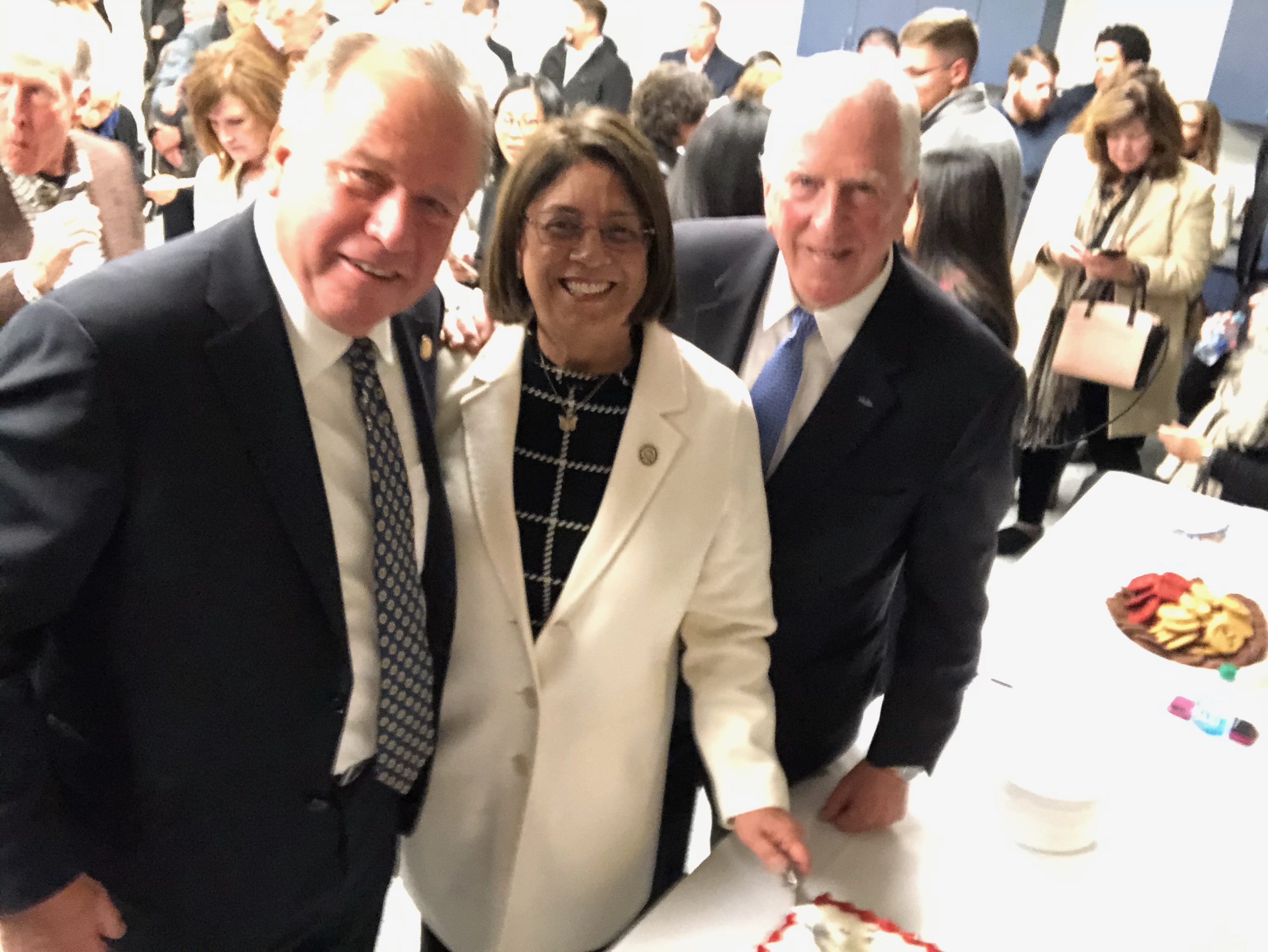
Aguiar-Curry with Mike Thompson and Bill Dodd in 2020.

== Electoral history ==
2016 California State Assembly 4th district election
Primary election
Party	Candidate	Votes	%
Democratic	Cecilia Aguiar-Curry	36,043	29.2
Republican	Charlie Schaupp	35,454	28.7
Democratic	Dan Wolk	31,405	25.4
Democratic	Don Saylor	18,284	14.8
Democratic	Elmer Mark Kropp	2,281	1.8
Total votes		123,467	100.0
General election
Democratic	Cecilia Aguiar-Curry	118,772	63.5
Republican	Charlie Schaupp	68,170	36.5
Total votes		186,942	100.0
Democratic hold			

2018 California State Assembly 4th district election
Primary election
Party	Candidate	Votes	%
Democratic	Cecilia Aguiar-Curry (incumbent)	77,882	99.5
Libertarian	Brandon Z. Nelson (write-in)	132	0.2
Republican	Cherylyn A. Nutting (write-in)	130	0.2
Green	Sarah Joan Fulton (write-in)	128	0.2
Total votes		78,272	100.0
General election
Democratic	Cecilia Aguiar-Curry (incumbent)	122,657	75.2
Libertarian	Brandon Z. Nelson	40,398	24.8
Total votes		163,055	100.0
Democratic hold			

2020 California State Assembly 4th district election
Primary election
Party	Candidate	Votes	%
Democratic	Cecilia Aguiar-Curry (incumbent)	83,861	58.5
Republican	Matthew L. Nelson	42,960	30.0
Democratic	Sophia Racke	16,570	11.6
Total votes		143,391	100.0
General election
Democratic	Cecilia Aguiar-Curry (incumbent)	150,157	66.7
Republican	Matthew L. Nelson	75,110	33.3
Total votes		225,267	100.0
Democratic hold			

2022 California State Assembly 4th district election
Primary election
Party	Candidate	Votes	%
Democratic	Cecilia Aguiar-Curry (incumbent)	70,593	67.1
Republican	Bryan Pritchard	34,532	32.8
No party preference	Susan G. Pelican (write-in)	36	0.0
Total votes		105,161	100.0
General election
Democratic	Cecilia Aguiar-Curry (incumbent)	99,342	64.9
Republican	Bryan Pritchard	53,734	35.1
Total votes		153,076	100.0
Democratic hold			

2024 California State Assembly 4th district election
Primary election
Party	Candidate	Votes	%
Democratic	Cecilia Aguiar-Curry (incumbent)	78,623	99.3
Republican	Darren Ellis (write-in)	525	0.6
Democratic	Sherman McFarland (write-in)	102	0.1
Total votes		79,250	100.0
General election
Democratic	Cecilia Aguiar-Curry (incumbent)	133,421	66.5
Republican	Darren Ellis	67,277	33.5
Total votes		200,698	100.0
Democratic hold			

California Assembly
Preceded by Chris Ward	Speaker pro tempore of the California Assembly; 2023	Succeeded by Jim Wood
Preceded by Isaac Bryan	Majority Leader of the California Assembly; 2023–present	Incumbent
