= Fort Bragg Unified School District =

School district in Mendocino County, Calif

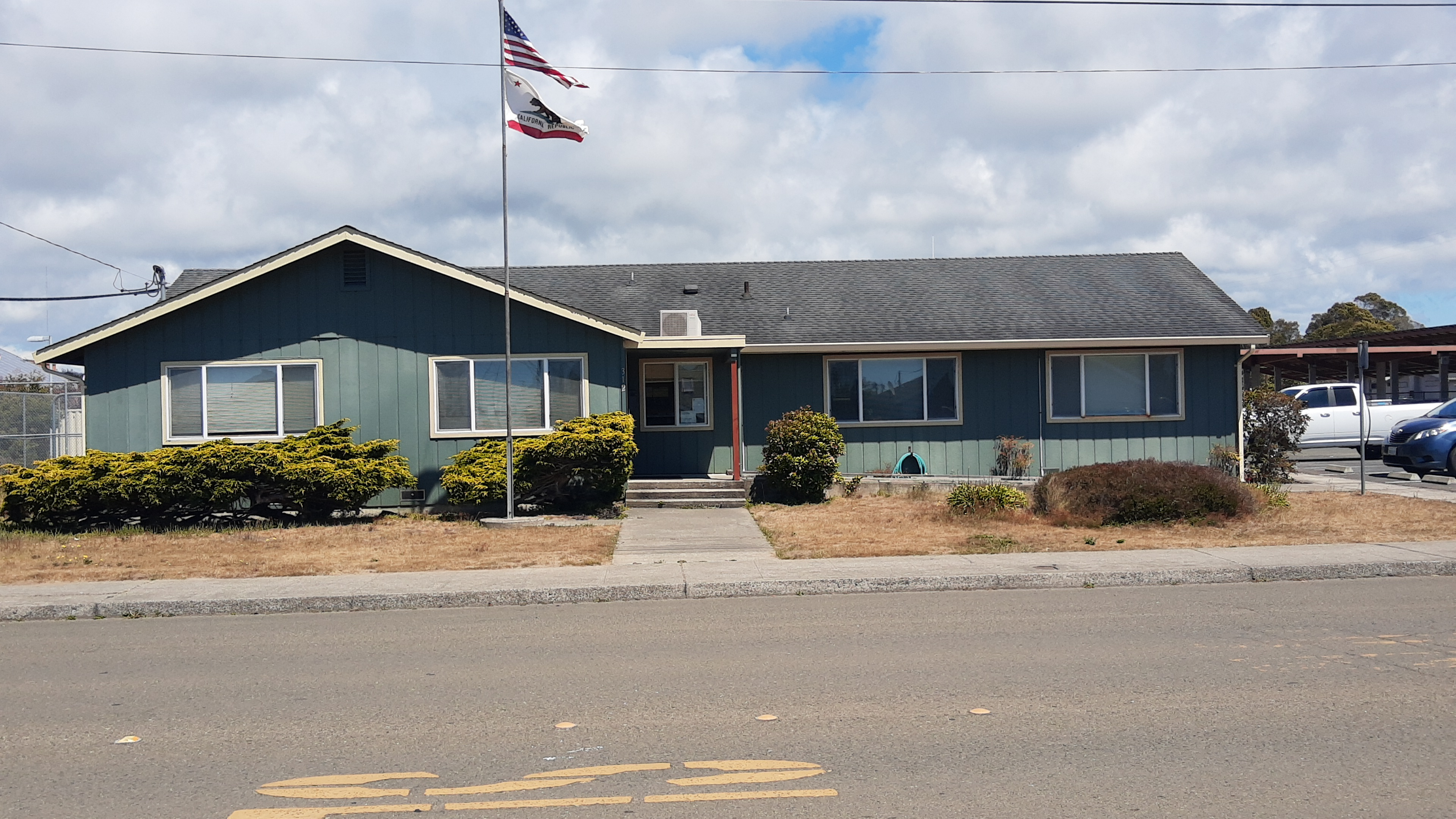
- District office

Address
- 312 South Lincoln Street Fort Bragg, Mendocino County, California, 95437; United States
- Coordinates: 39.4385°N 123.7953°W

District information
- Type: Unified
- Motto: Be Safe, Be Respectful, Be Responsible
- Grades: TK through Adult
- Established: 1895; 131 years ago
- President: Diana Paoli (2021)
- Vice-president: Maryjean Makela (2021)
- Superintendent: Rebecca C. Walker (2016–)
- Business administrator: Wendy Boise (2016–)
- School board: Five trustees (four-year terms)
- Governing agency: Calif. Department of Education
- Schools: Elementary: 2; Middle: 1; High: 1; Alternative: 4; Charter: 1
- Budget: $21.6 million (2018-19)
- NCES District ID: 0614070

Students and staff
- Students: 1883 (2018-19)
- Faculty: 124.4 (2017-18)
- Staff: 107.8 (2017-18)
- Student–teacher ratio: 15.1 (2017-18)
- Athletic conference: CA Interscholastic Fed.; North Coast Section; Coastal Mountain Conf.; North Central League I

Other information
- State achievement test: California Assessment of Student Performance and Progress
- Area served: 251.6 mi^{2} (652 km^{2})
- District population (households): 14,581 (5,861)
- Median household income: US$47,152
- Schedule: 180 days/year, M-F, August–June: Full day: 141; Early release: 39
- Website: www.fbusd.us
- Location of main office (red map pin) and schools within current district boundaries (Fort Bragg city limits in green)

Fort Bragg Unified School District, a public school district in Mendocino County, oversees public primary and secondary education in Fort Bragg, California and the surrounding area, accountable to both the local voters and the California Department of Education. It was organized in 1895, shortly before the town formally incorporated, for the families of the fast-growing number of men moving to the area to work for Union Lumber Company or one of the other local lumber mills during the logging boom of the late 19^{th} century.

Most students are served by the district's two secondary schools, two primary schools and transitional kindergarten, none of which have overlapping grade offerings. To serve students with special circumstances it also operates two community day schools (each mirroring the grade offerings of one of the secondary schools), a continuation school and an adult school, as well as exercising oversight and standards compliance functions for one all grades charter school.

In addition to Fort Bragg, the district's boundary includes Cleone.

== Governance ==
=== Board of trustees ===
As provided in its charter, the district's executive functions are held by a board of trustees composed of five members popularly-elected to four-year terms by those who are eligible to participate in county elections and live within the district service boundaries, such elections being held in all odd-numbered years and alternating between having the top two or three candidates receiving seats. At the end of each calendar year they elect a president and vice-president from among themselves in open session, with no member permitted to serve in one office more than twice consecutively. Public meetings are held at 6:00 p.m. on the second Thursday of every month at the John Diederich Education Center, located on the Fort Bragg High School campus and are broadcast live on YouTube and Vimeo.

==== Members ====
As of the November 3, 2020 Mendocino County general election, the district's board of trustees has the following members (shown with office held for the 2021 calendar year, if any):

- Diana Paoli, President (first elected: Nov. 8, 2016; current term: Dec. 1, 2018–Dec. 1, 2022)
- Maryjean Makela, Vice President (initial appointment: Nov. 11, 2018; current term: Dec. 1, 2020–Dec. 1, 2024)
- Kathy A. Babcock (first elected: Nov. 3, 2015; current term: Dec. 1, 2020–Dec. 1, 2024)
- Gerald Matson (initial appointment: Nov. 3, 2011; current term: Dec. 1, 2018–Dec. 1, 2022)
- Scott Schneider (first elected: Nov. 6, 2018; current term: Dec. 1, 2018–Dec. 1, 2022)

==== Student Representative ====
Beginning in 2015, the board also requests the elected student body officers of Fort Bragg High School to solicit volunteers and select from among them a student of the school to serve as a non-voting member of the board, their term to run from July 1 to June 30. This member is allowed to make and second motions on all business before the board save those that are held in closed session related to employment contracts, staff dispute resolution, or other matters related to information legally required to remain confidential. The Superintendent's office is required to provide the student board member with full and complete agendas and copies of any materials received by the board, and also to provide an area at the district office where they can work, make use of secretarial facilities and receive advice or information upon request.

== Administration ==
=== Superintendent ===
While the executive functions are ultimately held by the board of trustees, the by-laws state that in practice they will be exercised by a Superintendent of Schools whose careful selection and leadership of is explicitly defined as the board's most important responsibility. The Superintendent serves as the district's chief executive officer and ex officio as the board's secretary. Eligibility requirements for employment as Superintendent include the satisfactory completion of a background/criminal records investigation prior to being hired and the maintenance of both a valid school administration certificate and teaching credentials from the state for the duration of their tenure.

The district's current Superintendent, Rebecca C. Walker, was hired on August 15, 2016 as Superintendent (on an Interim basis, initially) following the resignation of Charles Bush. His departure from the position was after serving only two years of his initial three-year contract and was reported as the result of fundamental disagreements over district policy with parents and several trustees; later that year he was hired as the superintendent of Palo Verde Unified School District. Ms. Walker had been a teacher and then principal of Fort Bragg High School since 2012 and prior to that taught math at Fort Bragg Middle School, beginning in 1997 at the age of 24.

==== Recent superintendents ====
Name	Term began	Term ended	Average salary
Rebecca C. Walker	August 15, 2016	Incumbent	$130,290
Charles D. Bush	May 2014	June 30, 2016	$136,802
Donald F. Armstrong	July 2008	May 2014	$127,812
Steven Lund	April 2000	July 2008	—

=== Salaries ===
The average salary for district employees in 2016 was $41,234, 32.8% lower than the national average for government employees and 19.3% lower than the national average for the education sector.

=== Class sizes ===
Pursuant to the Educational Employment Relations Act of California ("Rodda Act"), the district negotiates its terms of employment with the representatives for the Fort Bragg District Teachers' Association labor union (a local of the California Teachers Association and affiliate of the National Education Association) at least once every three years. Among the many conditions set forth in each concluded agreement are the maximum size of classes assigned to its faculty, depending on the age of the students and the subject being taught. As of the agreement reached on June 26, 2019 that begins on July 1, 2019 and will expire on June 30, 2022, these are the maximum number of students allowed per class:

- Transitional Kindergarten through 3^{rd} Grade: 24 students
- 4^{th} and 5^{th} Grades: 28 students
- 6^{th} through 12^{th} Grades -
  - Core academic subjects: 30 students, and daily limit of 150 (Note: The standard school day is defined as having a different class assigned for each of six instructional periods for Fort Bragg High School and seven for Fort Bragg Middle School. Faculty members who are also responsible for an additional advisory period (more commonly known as "homeroom") have daily student limits of 160 and 170 at those schools respectively.) (Note: Class sizes may exceed this maximum by one student without the mutual written consent of the individual faculty member. When exceeded by two or more students it requires consultation with and written approval from both the faculty member and the union president.)
  - Physical Education: 38 students, and daily limit of 36 × the number of PE periods taught
  - Band/Chorus: 50 students
- Alternative/Special Education -
  - 5^{th} through 8^{th} Grades: 12 students
  - 9^{th} through 12^{th} Grades: 22 students, and district limit of 55 students for the three AE/SE teachers combined

== Schools ==
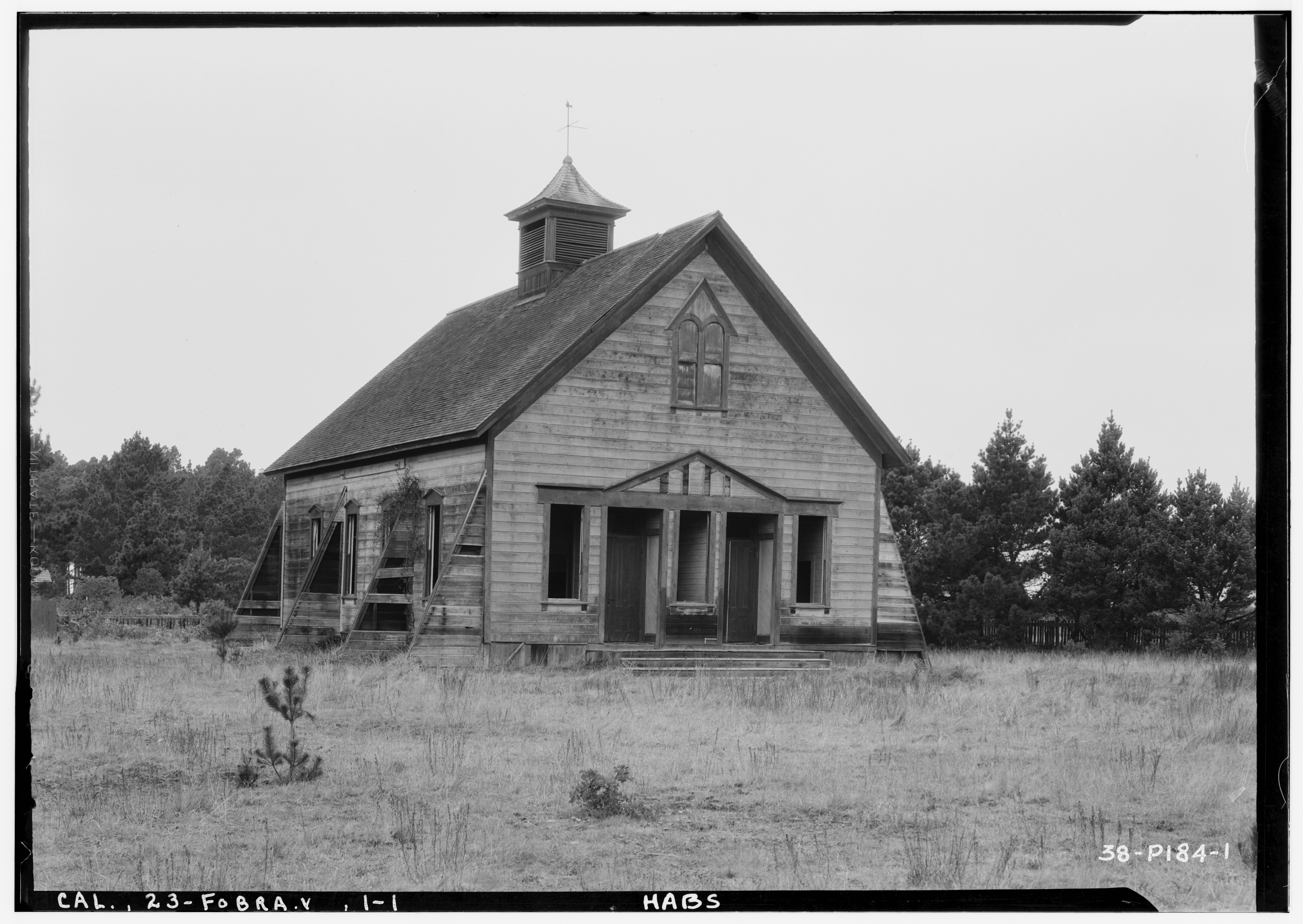
One of the district's early schoolhouses, already out of use when photographed in 1934

Fort Bragg USD schools
Name	School Type	Grades	Enrollment (2018–19)
Fort Bragg High	Secondary (Upper)	9-12	535
Fort Bragg Middle	Secondary (Lower)	6-8	406
Dana Gray Elementary	Primary	3-5	381
Redwood Elementary	Primary	K-2	444
Redwood Preschool	Transitional kindergarten	TK	32 (Note: Data for most recent year reported (2016-17))
Three Rivers Charter	Charter	1-12	116
Lighthouse Community Day	Community Day	9-12	22
Shelter Cove Community Day	Community Day	6-8	3
Noyo High	Secondary (Continuation)	N/A (Note: Offers individualized curriculum for each student with coursework from the sixth grade and above offered as needed)	15
Coastal Adult	Secondary (Adult)	N/A	— (Note: Data not included in CDOE reports)

=== Secondary schools ===
==== Fort Bragg High School ====
Fort Bragg High School (FBHS) was founded in 1907 as Fort Bragg Union High School. The school's athletic teams are called the Timberwolves and their mascot is Timmy Timberwolf. The football team has had five undefeated seasons, most recently in 1995 (finishing with an 11-0 record).

== Standardized testing ==
The California Assessment of Student Performance and Progress (CAASPP) testing framework was established in 2014 with a stated goal of offering greater transparency to parents, faculty and administrators regarding student progress using objective standards and easily understood reporting. Students are tested annually from grades three to eight and again in the eleventh grade. Two batteries of tests are taken, one in English Language Arts/Literacy and the other in Mathematics, delivered by computer with results delivered directly to the state Education Department.

California Assessment of Student Performance and Progress District-wide Results (3rd–8^{th} and 11^{th} Grades)
Academic year	English Language Arts/Literacy Standards			Mathematics Standards		
Academic year	Met/Exceeded	Nearly Met	Didn't Meet	Met/Exceeded	Nearly Met	Didn't Meet
2017-18	41.76%	27.73%	30.51%	27.65%	27.76%	44.59%
2016-17	41.70%	28.98%	29.31%	24.34%	31.61%	44.05%
2015-16	40%	28%	32%	24%	37%	38%
2014-15	38%	28%	34%	21%	33%	46%

== General Obligation Bonds ==
As of the most recent issuance of school bonds in 2016 ($5.5 million at 2.63% interest, 15-year term), the district's total outstanding bonded debt is US$42.6 million. Having been issued with terms ranging from 13 to 40 years and with interest rates ranging from 1.48% to 12%, if all outstanding bonds reached their natural maturity date the cost of debt service (principal + interest) for them would total US$99.5 million and last until the end of fiscal year 2047.

=== School bond election measures ===
- November 2003 - $22,200,000 - Vote in Favor: 65.8% - Purpose: renovate, modernize, safety compliance
- June 2008 - $16,000,000 - Vote in Favor: 69.2% - Purpose: To acquire, construct, modernize, and improve school facilities
