= Coastal Mountain Conference =

California high school athletic conference

- Conference logo
- Map of member school locations (Blue: NCL I, Green: NCL II, Red: NCL III)
- Abbreviation: CMC
- Formation: September 1914; 112 years ago
- Type: Nonprofit
- Purpose: Secondary school athletic conference
- Location(s): 3280 Clark Road; Philo, CA, 95466
- Coordinates: 39.10534°N 123.51899°W
- Region served: Redwood Empire
- Members: 26 schools (2018-19)
- Commissioner: Robert Pinoli
- Asst. Commissioner: Charles Davison
- Asst. Commissioner: Geri Giovannetti
- Parent organization: CIF North Coast Section
- Subsidiaries: North Central Leagues I–III
- Website: www.cmc-sports.org

The Coastal Mountain Conference or CMC is an athletic conference for secondary schools in Mendocino, Lake, Napa and Sonoma Counties that competes in the North Coast Section of the California Interscholastic Federation. Member schools are currently organized into three leagues (North Central Leagues I, II, and III) based on school size and various other criteria found in the conference's bylaws. League assignments are automatically reevaluated in all even numbered years or at any other time by written request of a member school, provided no other members file an objection. Conference champions from all three leagues advance in each sport to post-season competition in the North Coast Section's Division V bracket, of which the winner gains admission to the Class A state championship tournament.

The CMC is a CIF Class A conference (CIF Class A guideline: mostly schools with average enrollment of 600 students or less), though several schools are classified by the CIF as Class B and elect to "play up" in the CMC due to lack of a sufficient number of other similar size schools against which to compete. Similarly Lower Lake High School holds a 2A classification from the CIF but was granted a standing exemption to compete in a Class A conference as to do otherwise would require an excessive amount of travel. Classifications range from 4A for the largest, most historically competitive schools to B for the smallest and least competitive schools.

== Current alignment ==
=== North Central League I ===
The North Central League I (NCL I) houses the largest schools in the conference, the largest of which being Lower Lake High School with a 2A classification.

NCL I Member Schools
Name/Nickname/Colors	Location (County)	Enrollment (2018–19)	Boys sports	Girls sports	Co-ed sports	Athletic director	Primary rival
Clear Lake High School Cardinals BLACK CARDINAL	Lakeport (Lake)	394	Football (V/JV); Basketball (V/JV); Baseball (V/JV); Soccer; Wrestling	Basketball (V/JV); Soccer (V/JV); Volleyball (V/JV); Softball	Golf (V/JV); Cheerleading (Fall/Winter); Cross country; Cycling; Swimming; Tennis; Track and field	Glenn "Milo" Meyer	Kelseyville
Cloverdale High School Eagles ROYAL BLUE GOLD	Cloverdale (Sonoma)	377	Football (V/JV); Basketball (V/JV); Baseball (V/JV); Wrestling (V/JV); Soccer	Basketball (V/JV); Softball (V/JV); Volleyball (V/JV); Soccer	Cross country; Tennis; Track and field	Greg Alexander	none
Fort Bragg High School Timberwolves PURPLE WHITE GRAY	Fort Bragg (Mendocino)	512	Football (V/JV); Baseball (V/JV); Basketball; Soccer; Wrestling	Softball (V/JV); Volleyball (V/JV); Basketball; Soccer	Cheerleading; Cross country; Golf; Swimming; Tennis; Track and field	Mark Cimolino	Willits
Kelseyville High School Knights BLACK ORANGE	Kelseyville (Lake)	518	Football (V/JV); Basketball (V/JV); Baseball (V/JV); Soccer; Wrestling	Volleyball (V/JV); Softball; Soccer	Cross country; Golf; Cycling; Swimming; Tennis; Track and field	K.C WHITE	Clear Lake
Lower Lake High School Trojans BLUE WHITE BLACK	Lower Lake (Lake)	870	Football (V/JV); Basketball (V/JV); Baseball (V/JV); Wrestling (V/JV); Soccer	Basketball (V/JV); Softball (V/JV); Volleyball (V/JV); Wrestling; Soccer	Cross country; Track and field; Golf	Sarah Fuchs	Upper lake
Middletown High School Mustangs PURPLE WHITE GOLD	Middletown (Lake)	499	Football (V/JV); Basketball (V/JV/Fresh); Baseball (V/JV); Wrestling (V/JV); Soccer; Volleyball; Water polo	Basketball (V/JV/Fresh); Softball (V/JV); Volleyball (V/JV); Soccer; Water polo; Wrestling	Cross country; Golf; Tennis; Track and field	Airic Guerrero	St Helena
St. Helena High School Saints RED WHITE BLACK	St. Helena (Napa)	497	Football (V/JV); Basketball (V/JV/Fresh); Baseball (V/JV); Soccer (V/JV); Wrestling; Water polo	Basketball (V/JV/Fresh); Softball (V/JV); Volleyball (V/JV); Soccer (V/JV); Water polo	Cross country; Golf; Tennis; Track and field	Ricky broyals	Middletown
Willits High School Wolverines FOREST GREEN GOLD	Willits (Mendocino)	415	Football (V/JV); Basketball (V/JV); Baseball (V/JV/Fresh); Soccer (V/JV); Wrestling; Water polo	Basketball (V/JV); Softball (V/JV); Volleyball (V/JV); Soccer (V/JV); Wrestling; Water polo	Cross country; Golf; Tennis; Track and field	Marian Lohne	Fort Bragg

=== North Central League II ===
Comprising nine schools in the state's B classification, some field incomplete or non-competitive teams while other, former members have been consistent in winning and have succeeded in being promoted into the NCL I.

NCL II Member Schools
Name/Nickname/Colors	Location (County)	Enrollment (2019–20)	Boys sports	Girls sports	Co-ed sports	Athletic director(s)
Calistoga Junior/Senior High School Wildcats GREEN WHITE	Calistoga (Napa)	392	Basketball (V/JV); Baseball; Football; Soccer	Basketball (V/JV); Volleyball (V/JV); Soccer; Softball	Cheerleading; Cross country; Swimming; Tennis; Track and field	Louise Owens & Eric Heitz
Credo High School Gryphons BLUE WHITE	Rohnert Park (Sonoma)	406	Basketball (V/JV/Fresh); Baseball (V/JV); Soccer	Basketball (V/JV/Fresh); Volleyball (V/JV); Soccer; Softball	Cross country (V/JV); Tennis (V/JV); Cheerleading; Golf	Kim Holland
Grace Christian Academy Lions RED YELLOW WHITE	Santa Rosa (Sonoma)	200	Basketball; Volleyball	Basketball; Softball; Volleyball	Cross country; Swimming; Tennis; Track and field	Roger Maples
Roseland Collegiate Prep Grizzlies BLUE GREEN	Santa Rosa (Sonoma)	430	Basketball; Soccer	Basketball; Soccer; Volleyball	Cross country	
Roseland University Prep Knights PURPLE GRAY WHITE	Santa Rosa (Sonoma)	482	Basketball (V/JV); Football; Soccer; Volleyball	Basketball (V/JV); Soccer; Volleyball	Badminton; Cross country	Luis Escobar & Javier Romo
Sonoma Academy Coyotes GOLD GREEN	Santa Rosa (Sonoma)	325	Basketball (V/JV); Soccer (V/JV); Baseball; Lacrosse	Basketball (V/JV); Soccer (V/JV); Volleyball (V/JV); Lacrosse	Cross country; Debate; Speech; Tennis; Track and Field	Chris Ziemer
Technology High School Titans WHITE ROYAL BLUE	Rohnert Park (Sonoma)	322	Baseball; Basketball; Soccer	Basketball; Soccer; Softball; Volleyball	Cross country; Dance; Golf; Swimming; Tennis; Track and field	Amy Alvarez
Tomales High School Braves BLACK WHITE RED	Tomales (Marin)	165	Football (V/JV); Basketball (V/JV); Baseball (V/Fresh); Soccer; Wrestling		Tennis; Water polo	Dominic Sacheli
Victory Christian Academy	Santa Rosa (Sonoma)	135	Basketball (V/JV)	Basketball (V/JV); Volleyball (V/JV)	Cross country; Tennis; Track and field	Kelly DeVries

=== North Central League III ===
Most schools within NCL III are small mountain towns located around the redwood forests near Mendocino County, some of which lack the student interest necessary to field a complete team each year for most sports. League schedules for each sport are usually available once the tryout period has closed and they have communicated to the Conference office the level of participation they can reasonably expect to provide.

Anderson Valley High School (Boonville)	Calistoga High School (Calistoga)
Geyserville High School (Geyserville)	Laytonville High School (Laytonville)
Mendocino High School (Mendocino)	Point Arena High School (Point Arena)
Potter Valley High School (Potter Valley)	Round Valley High School (Covelo)
Leggett Valley High School (Leggett)

== Former members ==
- ~~Santa Rosa Christian High School~~

== Athletics ==
The CMC offers an array of sports; Swimming, Football, Soccer, Basketball, Baseball, Softball, Wrestling, Volleyball, Tennis, Track and Field, Cross Country, and Golf.

=== Football ===
Sending one team from each league, the CMC sent Middletown and St. Helena as its lone representatives to the Class A Playoffs in 2006 and sent Tomales, Calistoga and Mendocino for the Class B playoffs. While Middletown and St. Helena were eliminated in the first round, Tomales played Mendocino in the Class B final.

=== Volleyball ===
In 2006, the CMC sent Clear Lake to the Division 4 Playoffs while sending St. Helena, Cloverdale, Anderson Valley, Rincon Valley Christian, Tomales and Mendocino to the Division 5 playoffs. RVC and Anderson Valley fared the best as the latter fell to eventual champions Crystal Springs Uplands in the semi-finals while the former lost to Crystal Springs in the final.

=== Basketball ===
In Boys' Basketball, the CMC sent Fort Bragg and Middletown as its two teams. Both fell in the first rounds. In Girls', Willits, Kelseyville and Lower Lake made their way to the playoffs but only to go the same fate as the boys.

In Division 5 action, Cloverdale, Calistoga, Rincon Valley Christian, Point Arena and Mendocino qualified for the Boys' Playoffs. Cloverdale went on to the semi-finals where they lost to International. The girl's side sent Rincon Valley Christian, St. Vincent, Calistoga, and Laytonville. RVC made a spectacular run to the finals where they lost against a great Branson team.
