= Ronnie Cruz =

American football player (born 1981)

No. 42
- Position: Fullback

Personal information
- Born: June 11, 1981 (age 45); Lakeport, California, U.S.
- Listed height: 6 ft 0 in (1.83 m)
- Listed weight: 244 lb (111 kg)

Career information
- High school: Clear Lake High School (Lakeport)
- College: Northern State University
- NFL draft: 2004: undrafted

Career history
- Kansas City Chiefs (2004–2006); Dallas Cowboys (2008)*; Florida Tuskers (2009)*
- * Offseason or practice squad member only

Awards and highlights
- First-team All-NSIC (2003)

Career NFL statistics
- Rushing attempts: 5
- Rushing yards: 19
- Receptions: 3
- Receiving yards: 35
- Stats at Pro Football Reference

Ronnie Valentin Cruz (born June 11, 1981) is an American former professional football player who was a fullback for the Kansas City Chiefs of the National Football League (NFL). He was signed by the Chiefs as an undrafted free agent in 2004. He played college football for the Northern State Wolves.

Cruz was also a member of the Dallas Cowboys and Florida Tuskers.

== Early life ==
Ronnie Cruz was named football MVP and student-athlete of the year at Clear Lake High School in Lakeport, California. He ranked second in rushing in the state of California.

== College career ==
Ronnie Cruz began his collegiate career at Mendocino Community College in Ukiah, California, where he was an all-conference and all-region honoree. He had 152 carries for 863 yards and 10 scores as a freshman in 14 games played. He finished his sophomore season with 264 attempts for 1,779 rushing yards with 14 touchdowns.

He played two years at Northern State University in Aberdeen, South Dakota. As a Junior Cruz led the school with 200 carries for 892 rushing yards and seven touchdowns along with six receptions for 59 yards with one score. As a Senior he played in 11 games, recording 1,476 rushing yards on 240 carries with 18 touchdowns and 33 receptions for 316 yards with one score. Cruz was named to the first-team All-Region and Northern Sun Intercollegiate Conference teams as a senior. He ranked eighth in scoring and 10th in rushing his senior year.

=== Career college statistics ===
Year	Team	Games	Carries	Yards	Yards per carry	Touchdowns	Receptions	Rec. yards	Rec. TDs
2000	MC	14	152	863	5.68	10	N/A	N/A	N/A
2001	MC	14	264	1,779	6.74	14	N/A	N/A	N/A
2002	NSU	10	200	892	4.46	7	6	59	1
2003	NSU	11	240	1,476	6.15	18	33	316	1
Career		49	856	5,010	5.76	49	39	375	2

== Professional career ==
=== Kansas City Chiefs ===
His role with the Kansas City Chiefs in 2005 was mostly a backup role at halfback to Priest Holmes and Larry Johnson, and backup to fullback Tony Richardson. Prior to the 2006 season, Richardson signed with the Minnesota Vikings, giving the starting fullback role to Cruz. In week six, Cruz suffered a knee injury that benched him for the entire 2006 season. The Chiefs released Cruz at the beginning of the 2007 season.

=== Dallas Cowboys ===
On January 18, 2008, Cruz signed with the Dallas Cowboys. He quickly worked his way to second on the depth chart as a fullback, but a shoulder injury in a preseason game ended his season. He was later released by the Cowboys with an injury settlement.

=== Florida Tuskers ===
Cruz was selected by the Florida Tuskers on the UFL Premiere Season Draft in 2009 and signed with the team on August 17.

== Personal life ==
Cruz is now a bail bondsman and fugitive recovery agent. He now owns and operates Cruz Out of Jail Bail Bonds with two locations: one office in Sacramento, CA and the other in Lakeport, CA.
