= Clear Lake High School =

Clear Lake High School may refer to:

- Clear Lake High School (California)
- Clear Lake High School (Iowa)
- Clear Lake High School (Texas)
- Clear Lake High School (Wisconsin)
