= MUSD =

MUSD may refer to:

- Million United States dollars
- Marana Unified School District, a public school district in Marana, Arizona
- Martinez Unified School District, a public school district in Contra Costa County, California
- Middletown Unified School District, a public school district in Middletown, California
- Milpitas Unified School District, a public school district in Milpitas, California
- Morongo Unified School District, a public education governing body in the Mojave high desert, Southern California
