= Middletown Rancheria of Pomo Indians of California =

Tribe in California

Coordinates: 38°43′43″N 122°37′33″W

Total population
- over 73

Regions with significant populations
- United States (California)

Languages
- English, Pomoan languages

Related ethnic groups
- Pomo tribes, Wappo, Lake Miwok, Wintun

Location of Middletown Rancheria

The Middletown Rancheria of Pomo Indians of California is a federally recognized tribe of Pomo Indians, as well as some Wappo and Lake Miwok Indians, in California, headquartered in Middletown, California.

The tribe's reservation is the Middletown Rancheria, located north-northeast of Santa Rosa. It was established in 1910 and occupies 109 acres (0.44 km^{2}) in Lake County. Approximately 73 tribal members live on the reservation.

The Middletown Pomos own the Twin Pine Casino and Hotel, located in Middletown.

== Education ==
The ranchería is served by the Middletown Unified School District.
