= Kitchener-Waterloo Dutchmen =

Kitchener-Waterloo Dutchmen could mean the following:

- Kitchener-Waterloo Dutchmen (football), a member of the Ontario Rugby Football Union
- Kitchener-Waterloo Dutchmen (ice hockey), a senior ice hockey team that represented Canada in the 1956 and 1960 Winter Olympics
- Kitchener-Waterloo Dutchmen, an Intercounty Baseball League team now known as the Kitchener Panthers

== See also ==
- Kitchener Dutchmen
