= Roy Stevenson =

Canadian football player (born c. 1933)

Profile
- Positions: Guard, Tackle

Personal information
- Born: c. 1933 (age 92–93); Chatham, Ontario, Canada
- Listed height: 6 ft 1 in (1.85 m)
- Listed weight: 200 lb (91 kg)

Career information
- University: Toronto

Career history
- 1955–1961: Edmonton Eskimos

Awards and highlights
- Grey Cup champion (1955, 1956)

Roy Stevenson (born c. 1933) was a Canadian professional football player who played for the Edmonton Eskimos. He won the Grey Cup with the Eskimos in 1955 and 1956. Born in Chatham, Ontario, he previously attended the University of Toronto, where he played on the football team. He also played for the Kitchener-Waterloo Dutchmen.
