= Lakeport Auto Movies =

Lakeport Auto Movies Drive-In
- Full name: Lakeport Auto Movies Drive-In
- Address: 52 Soda Bay Road; Lakeport, California; U.S.
- Owner: John Tegtmeier

Construction
- Built: 1972
- Opened: 1974

Website
- www.lakeportautomovies.com

Lakeport Auto Movies Drive-In is a drive-in movie theater located on Soda Bay Road in Lakeport, California.

== History and description ==
The Lakeport Auto Movies drive-in theater was built in 1972 and opened for business in 1974. It features a "large lot" accompanied by a red, mixed-use warehouse that contains a snack bar and public restrooms. On March 9, 2020 it was announced that Lakeport Auto Movies and the accompanying Lakeport Cinema 5 would be closed "for the foreseeable future" due to the COVID-19 pandemic. The theaters were reopened on May 21, 2020. As of June 2020 Lakeport Auto Movies was owned by John Tegtmeier.

== Reception ==
Lakeport Auto Movies was included in The Manual's 7 "Coolest Drive-In Movie Theaters in the U.S."
