= Kanuck =

Kanuck may refer to:

- Canuck, slang term for Canadians
- Kanuck, California, former name of Cleone, California
