= St. Helena High School =

Location
- 1401 Grayson Ave. St. Helena, California 94574; United States; 38.4968947617199°N 122.4625741937362°W

Information
- School type: Public
- Motto: "Wisdom is Knowing What to Do Next. Virtue is Doing It."
- Established: 1895
- School district: St. Helena Unified School District
- CEEB code: 052-740
- Principal: Benjamin Scinto
- Faculty: 40
- Teaching staff: 31.81 (FTE)
- Grades: 9 – 12
- Student to teacher ratio: 13.23
- Hours in school day: 8:15am – 3:22pm (374 minutes)
- Colors: Red, white, and black
- Fight song: When The Saints Go Marching In
- Athletics: 14 (4 boys, 5 girls, 5 coed)
- Athletics conference: North Central League 1, Coastal Mountain Conference
- Team name: Saints
- Rival: Justin-Siena High School Calistoga High School
- Accreditation: Western Association of Schools and Colleges (WASC)
- Website: St Helena HS website
- St. Helena High School
- U.S. National Register of Historic Places
- Location within California Location within the United States
- Location: 437 Main St., St. Helena, California
- Coordinates: 38°29′51″N 122°27′38″W
- Area: 0.2 acres (0.081 ha)
- Built: 1913
- NRHP reference No.: 78000727
- Added to NRHP: May 22, 1978

Saint Helena High School or more commonly, St. Helena High, is an American public high school located in St. Helena, California in the Napa Valley of California. St. Helena High serves grades 9-12 and is the only source of secondary education in the St. Helena Unified School District.

== History ==
The first "high school" in St. Helena were actually classes held at the local Presbyterian Church for one year in 1895. The next year, the high school had its first official building when it moved into the now defunct Turner Hall in Lyman Park in the center of the town. Classes were held there until 1912.

In 1910, Frances Grayson Crane donated land to open a new high school. Construction finished in 1912 and the resulting school, St. Helena High School, was opened. The new building boasted two stories, a laboratory, a wood shop and a basketball court. An auditorium was built adjacent around the 1960s. The stone building was used from 1912 until the 1960s when it was declared earthquake unsafe for students. In 1967, a new building, now known as the 100 Wing was built. Two more wings were built soon after and a new office was constructed in 1975. By then, the 1912 stone building was renamed Vintage Hall, but was no longer used by students.

The old stone building underwent a historic restoration and earthquake retrofit, which was completed in 2003. The facility now houses high school space, including a cafeteria on the ground floor. The second floor is used by the St. Helena Unified School District offices, including a state of the art meeting room used by the school board and the St. Helena city council for their sessions. Students use the TV studio located in the meeting room.

When all construction was completed, the school had 3 wings, an office, a gym, a baseball field, a football field, track and a pool. In the years following the construction of the new high school, a JV baseball field was built, as well as two Agricultural buildings. The auditorium built in the 1960s was condemned as of 2011-2012, and was demolished. Construction estimates that the new building should be finished in the year 2016. The swimming pool has also been renovated as of 2014, and is now available to students for use.

== Campus ==
St. Helena High is located near several wineries and vineyards near downtown St. Helena. The school itself is parallel to State Route 29 on the southern end of town.

== Advanced Placement ==
As of the 2015-2016 school year, there are currently 10 AP classes

- AP Biology
- AP Calculus
- AP English Literature
- AP English Language
- AP French
- AP Psychology
- AP Spanish
- AP United States History
- AP Comparative Government
- AP World History: Modern

== Athletics ==
The Saints, as St. Helena is colloquially known, compete in the North Central League 1 in the Coastal Mountain Conference. From the early 1920s until the mid-1960s, St. Helena competed in the North Bay League, regularly facing much larger schools from the greater Fairfield and Sonoma areas. Under coach George Davis (varsity football coach 1960-64), the Saints won 45 consecutive football games in an era when teams played only 9 games in a season. Over this five-year period, the Saints were totally dominant as their offense scored a total of 1,267 points and their defense allowed opponents only 130. This took place before the introduction of section and state championships. St. Helena moved to the North Central League, showing prowess in basketball and in football in the 1970s. St. Helena's success in these two sports was capped by a CIF title in 1977 for football and 3 CIF titles for the basketball teams. However, after the success of their 1977 campaign, the football team began to falter, eventually falling into mediocrity while the basketball team never reached the same kind of success. Volleyball began to become wildly successful at this time, and after numerous league titles, it was decided that after winning the 1982 state volleyball championship, that St. Helena would move to the Superior California Athletic League, colloquially known as the SCAL.

While the volleyball continued success, winning another state championship in 1984, the shortsighted move was detrimental to all other sports. St. Helena could simply not compete with many Solano County schools at the time. While most larger sports found little to no success, the less glamorous sports of tennis and track and field basked in success in the late 1980s. The tennis team enjoyed immense success at this time, winning 3 Sac Joaquin Section titles in coed tennis whilst making 11 trips to the finals, 10 straight and many against then rival Justin-Siena High School. By contrast, the football and softball teams performed abysmally, with the football program changing head coaches every other year.

By the late 1990s, basketball had slowly rose to prominence once again, reaching the Sac Joaquin playoffs numerous times. It was announced, however, that 1999 would be St. Helena's final year in the SCAL which had fallen on hard times. Only 5 schools remained and the league would soon fold. In the twilight of the SCAL's salad days, St. Helena surprised many, finishing the 1999 football season with a 9-1 record, falling short of going undefeated. With the SCAL defunct by mid 2000, St. Helena was assigned into the North Coast League along with Justin-Siena by the CIF. Justin-Siena later moved to the Marin County League, to face other competition.

In this new environment, progress was slow, and league titles were scarce. The tennis team, which had been such a powerhouse in the Sac Joaquin Section, was shocked to learn that the North Coast Section did not offer Coed Tennis, thus hindering any chance of winning a section title. Volleyball continued its success, regularly putting up winning records. Baseball, which has never truly been a powerhouse sport at St. Helena, underwent a revival at about this time, first with a non-losing season, finishing at .500 for the first time since the mid '80s. The following season, they finished with a winning season, a sign that baseball, though not at a top tier level, is starting to rise at St. Helena.

The soccer team, which had started as a school club in the 1970s had begun to show success in the late 1990s under head coach Ozzie Gallegos. Eventually, when St. Helena moved to the NCS, the Saints became a regular contender in the NCL as well as the section playoffs. Recent years have shown the team going deep in the section playoffs, reaching the championship in 2004 before falling to University High School of San Francisco.

Traditionally, St. Helena's rival is Justin-Siena High School of nearby Napa. The two school's football teams would meet each year in what was known as the Vine Bowl until 2000 when Justin-Siena joined the MCAL making matches against St. Helena and Justin-Siena scarce and relegated to just the NCS Playoffs. St. Helena's geographic rival, Calistoga has moved to another league within the Coastal Mountain Conference making their matchups scarce as well, though they are slated to face each other in football beginning in 2008. Lately, however, sporting events against Middletown High School of nearby Middletown have become more heated and a small rivalry has started to form.

== Band ==
The marching band at St. Helena High School resumed in the 2010s after a 30-year break.

== Sister school ==
Nuriootpa High School is a sister school located in Nuriootpa, South Australia, Australia.

Stanthorpe State High School- Australia, QLD, Stanthorpe

== Alumni ==
Notable alumni of St. Helena High include filmmaker Sofia Coppola, museologist Grace Morley, and politician Mike Thompson.
