= Twin Pine Casino =

Indian casino in California

Twin Pine casino
- Interactive map of Twin Pine casino
- Location: Middletown, California; Hwy 29 at Rancheria Road; 38.732381°N 122.624255°W
- Opened: November 1994
- No. of rooms: 60
- Notable restaurants: Manzanita Restaurant
- Owner: Middletown Rancheria of Pomo Indians

Twin Pine casino is an Indian casino located in Middletown, California. It opened in November 1994 and is owned by the Middletown Rancheria of Pomo Indians.

The 10,000 square feet (930 m^{2}) casino has over 500 gaming machines, and 12 gaming tables.

The hotel, first planned in 2007, and opened in 2009, has 60 rooms.
