= Ray Peterson (American football) =

American football player (1913–1999)

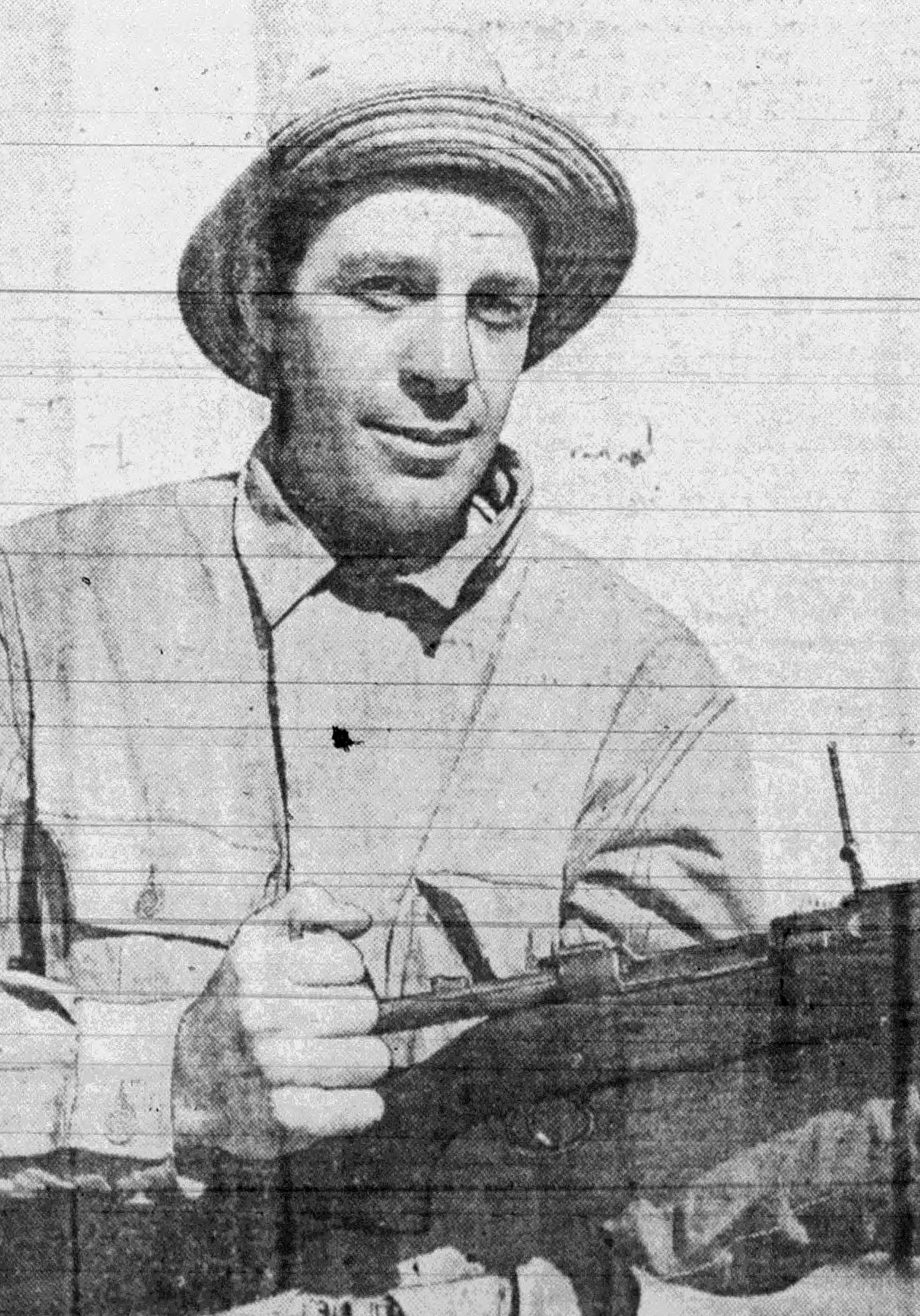
- Peterson, circa 1942

No. 33
- Position: Tailback

Personal information
- Born: June 27, 1913; Fort Bragg, California, U.S.
- Died: June 14, 1999 (aged 85); Fort Bragg, CA, U.S.
- Listed height: 6 ft 0 in (1.83 m)
- Listed weight: 190 lb (86 kg)

Career information
- High school: Fort Bragg
- College: San Francisco

Career history
- Green Bay Packers (1937)

Career statistics
- Passing attempts: 6
- Pass completions: 3
- Passing yards: 47
- Stats at Pro Football Reference

Ray Peterson (June 27, 1913 – June 14, 1999) was an American professional football player for the Green Bay Packers of the National Football League (NFL). Peterson was born on June 27, 1913, in Fort Bragg, California, where he attended Fort Bragg High School. After high school, he attended the University of San Francisco where he played for the school's football team. In addition to his duties as a fullback, he was also the team's punter.

He played one season, as a tailback, with Green Bay in 1937. He appeared in two games, completing three passes for 47 yards. In October 1937, he was released by the Packers.
