= Saint Helena Unified School District =

School district in California, United States

Address
- 465 Main Street St. Helena, California, 94574; United States

District information
- Type: Public
- Grades: K–12
- NCES District ID: 0637830

Students and staff
- Students: 1,187
- Teachers: 87.37
- Staff: 72.75
- Student–teacher ratio: 13.59

Other information
- Website: www.sthelenaunified.org

Saint Helena Unified School District is a school district headquartered in Saint Helena, California.

As of 2020 the superintendent is Marylou Wilson. Its National Center for Education Statistics (NCES) ID is 0637830.

== Schools ==
- Saint Helena High School
- Robert Louis Stevenson Middle School - Circa 2020 it had about 288 students.
- Saint Helena Elementary School - Circa 2020 it had 229 students, and/or 236 students.
- Saint Helena Primary School - Circa 2020 it had 238 students.
