= Fort Bragg High School =

Public secondary school in Fort Bragg, California (United States)

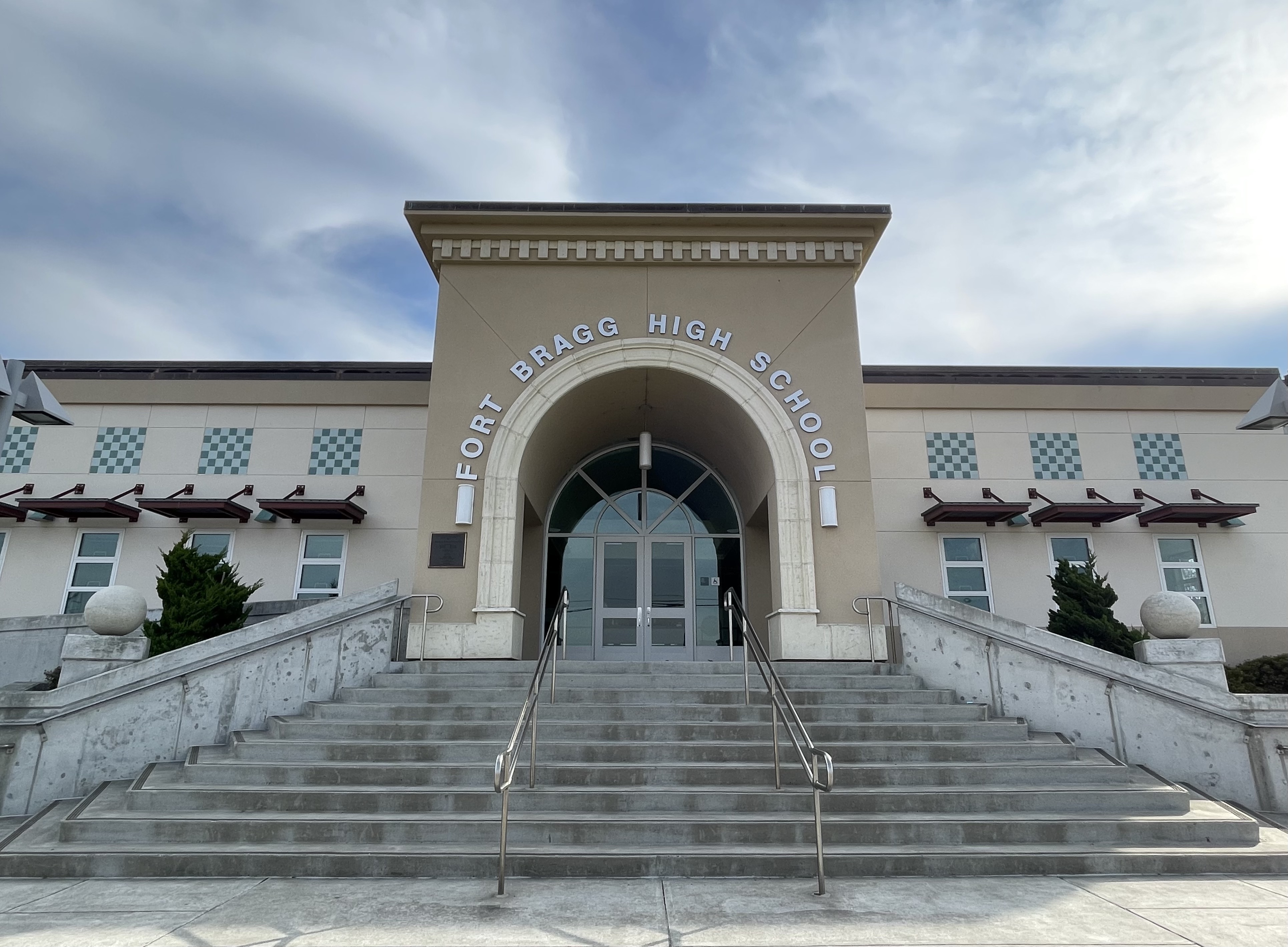
- Front façade at the school's main entrance

Location
- 300 Dana Street; Fort Bragg, Mendocino County, California 95437; United States; 39.4378°N 123.7882°W

Information
- Former name: Fort Bragg Union High School
- School type: Public, comprehensive high school
- Motto: Be Respectful. Be Prepared. Work Hard.
- Established: November 6, 1907 (119 years ago)
- Status: Operational
- School district: Fort Bragg Unified
- NCES District ID: 0614070
- Local authority: Mendocino Co. Office of Education
- Educational authority: California Department of Education
- Superintendent: Rebecca Walker
- School code: CDS 23-65565-2331361
- CEEB code: 050955
- NCES School ID: 061407001610
- Principal: Bruce Triplett
- Staff: 19
- Teaching staff: 33.14 FTE
- Grades: 9^{th} through 12^{th}
- Enrollment: 521 (2023-2024)
  - Grade 9: 151
  - Grade 10: 121
  - Grade 11: 127
  - Grade 12: 122
- Average class size: 18.3
- Student to teacher ratio: 15.72
- Education system: Common Core
- Schedule: 180 days/year, M-F, August–June: Full day: 141; Early release: 39
- Hours in school day: 7 (385 mins. instruction + 35 min. lunch)
- Campus type: Suburban
- Colors: Purple; White; Gray
- Fight song: Timberwolf Territory
- Athletics conference: Calif. Interscholastic Federation; North Coast Section; Coastal Mountain Conf.; North Central League I
- Sports: Click for team listing →: Baseball (V/JV); Boys Basketball (V/JV); Girls Basketball (V/JV); Co-ed Cheer & Spirit (V); Boys Cross Country (V); Girls Cross Country (V); Football (V/JV); Boys Golf (V); Girls Golf (V); Boys Soccer (V/JV); Girls Soccer (V/JV); Softball (V/JV); Boys Swimming (V); Girls Swimming (V); Boys Tennis (V); Girls Tennis (V); Boys Track and field (V/JV); Girls Track & Field (V/JV); Girls Volleyball (V/JV); Boys Wrestling (V); Girls Wrestling (V)
- Mascot: Timmy the Timberwolf
- Nickname: Timberwolves
- Rival: Willits High School
- Accreditation: ACS WASC
- USNWR ranking: 664 / 2,494 (California only)
- National ranking: 4,592 / 17,245
- SAT average: 1506 / 2400 (2016)
- Newspaper: The Howl
- Yearbook: Breath of Ocean
- Feeder schools: Fort Bragg Middle School
- Graduates (2018): 134
- Graduation rate (2016–18): 88.8%
- Website: fbhs.fbusd.us
- <mapframe frameless='' align='center' width='300' height='300' zoom='13' latitude='39.441' longitude='-123.802'>[{ "type": "ExternalData", "service": "geoline", "ids": "Q108087", "properties": { "stroke": "#B22222", "stroke-width": 5
- Last updated: September 4, 2019

Fort Bragg High School is the comprehensive public high school in Fort Bragg, California, United States, responsible for offering the ninth through twelfth grades to students in the Fort Bragg Unified School District. The school serves a remote area of Mendocino County, its service boundary containing 14,689 residents living in an area of greater than 251 square miles as of the 2010 census. In addition to Fort Bragg, the school district, of which this is the sole comprehensive high school, includes Cleone.

== History ==
Upon incorporating in 1889, Fort Bragg established its first public school for children in grades one through eight, the four-room City Grammar School and six years later added another of equal size, Park Grammar School. With no legal requirement at the time to educate children older than 14, no public option was provided for students above that age. When the 1906 San Francisco earthquake and subsequent three days of fire struck the area a large majority of the town's structures were destroyed, including both schools. Afterwards, it was decided during the rush to rebuild that the time had come to construct a modest high school in addition to rebuilding the existing two. Records show that a "Mr. Biggers" was contracted to oversee the construction for a sum of $16,500 (equivalent to $591,000 in 2025, adjusted for inflation) on land the city purchased from Dave Brandon, located on Harrison Street just north of the intersection with Bush.

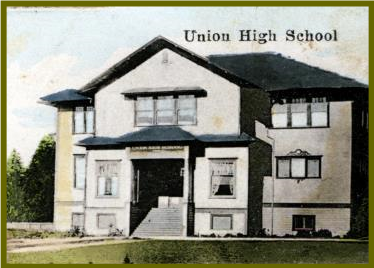
Original building used by Fort Bragg Union High School, built 1907, expanded 1916

On November 6, 1907, a dedication ceremony was held for Fort Bragg Union High School which began holding classes immediately. At that time only one in ten American children from ages 14–17 were still pursuing a formal education yet the school outgrew its accommodations at a startling pace, requiring an addition to be built in 1916 that doubled the original number of classrooms. Again in 1936 the school neared the limits of the students it could reasonably enroll as the High school movement, championed by the civic leaders of the nation's Progressive Era, reached the area. The need for a larger campus catalyzed the undertaking of one of the largest building projects in town to the present day, made possible by funding from the New Deal's $6 billion Federal Emergency Administration of Public Works budget. Ground was broken that year on a 2,800 acre parcel along the banks of Pudding Creek, technically within the town of East Fort Bragg, though just six blocks east of its original site.

The first phase of the new school's construction to reach completion was the attached Cotton Auditorium, an 842-seat auditorium intended to serve both the school and the city's barely 3,000 residents, which opened on July 1, 1937. Complete with a proscenium arch and ample flyspace, double-aisle orchestra seating, a large balcony and (formerly) six luxury boxes it remains in widespread use, still the largest performing arts venue in the 200-mile section of coastal Northern California between Eureka and Santa Rosa. The school building itself was completed less than a year later, retaining its original name despite the technical change of municipality, with all operations moved in time for the start of the 1938-39 school year.

== Academics ==
The state Department of Education's 2017 report showed that only 28.6% of males and 49.1% of females in the graduating class had successfully completed the minimum coursework necessary to apply for acceptance at the state's two public university systems, University of California and California State University, with a 2.0 GPA or higher.

== Demographics ==
The demographic makeup of the 535 students enrolled for 2017-18 was:

- By gender:
  - Male - 47.3%
  - Female - 52.7%
- By ethnicity:
  - White - 47.85%
  - Hispanic/Latino - 42.62%
  - Native American - 1.12%
  - Asian - 0.93%
  - African-American - 0.93%
  - Multiracial - 0.37%
  - Filipino - 0.19%

The state Department of Education classified 334 students (62.4%) in the 2017-18 enrollment as socio-economically disadvantaged, the criteria for which is either to be eligible for free/reduced price school meals, or whose parents/guardians do not possess a high school diploma or equivalent certificate of proficiency. Also during the 2017-18 academic year, 26 students (4.9%) were reported as belonging to a household that received assistance from the Mendocino County Health & Human Services Agency while experiencing a period of homelessness. For 2015-16, Fort Bragg was a Title I school.

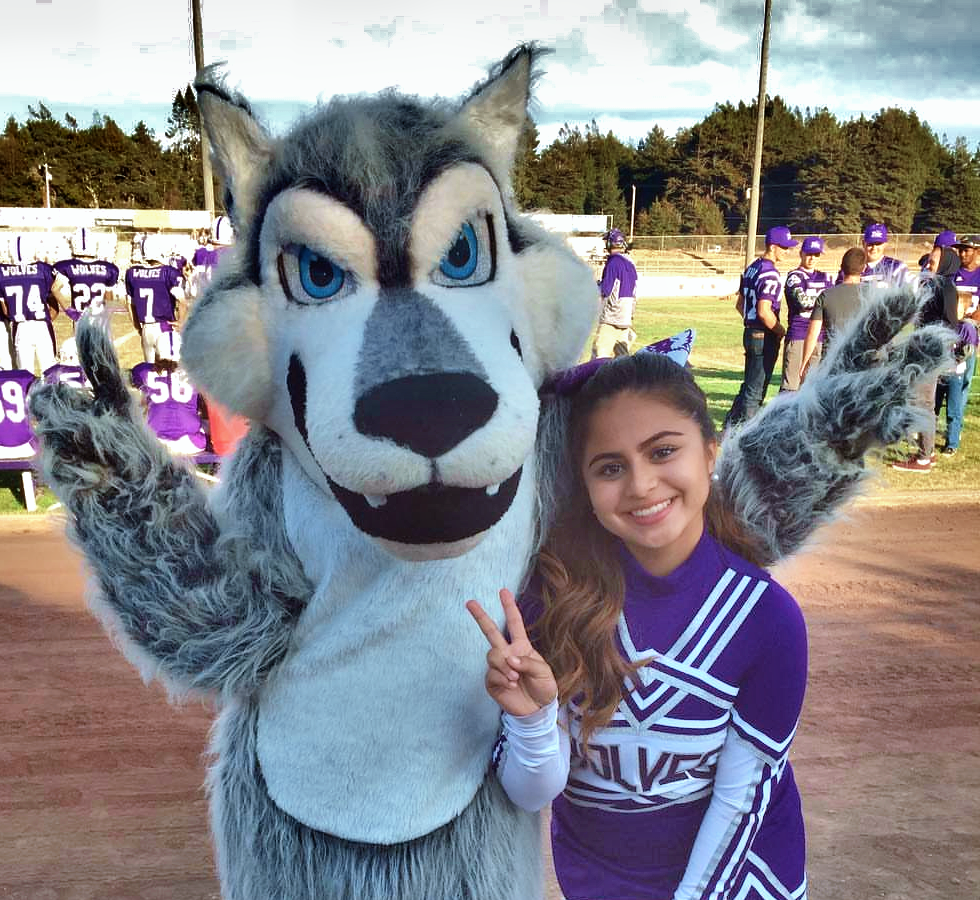
Timmy the Timberwolf

== Athletics ==
The school's athletic teams are called the Timberwolves and their mascot is Timmy the Timberwolf. The football team has had five undefeated seasons, most recently in 1995 (finishing with an 11-0 record).

== Notable alumni ==
- Robert L. "Bob" Celeri - National Football League quarterback, 1951 New York Yanks & 1952 Dallas Texans
- John DeSilva - Major League Baseball pitcher, 1993-95
- Les Munns - Major League Baseball pitcher, 1934-36
- Raymond C. "Ray" Peterson - National Football League running back, 1937 Green Bay Packers
