= Bob Celeri =

American football player (1927–1975)

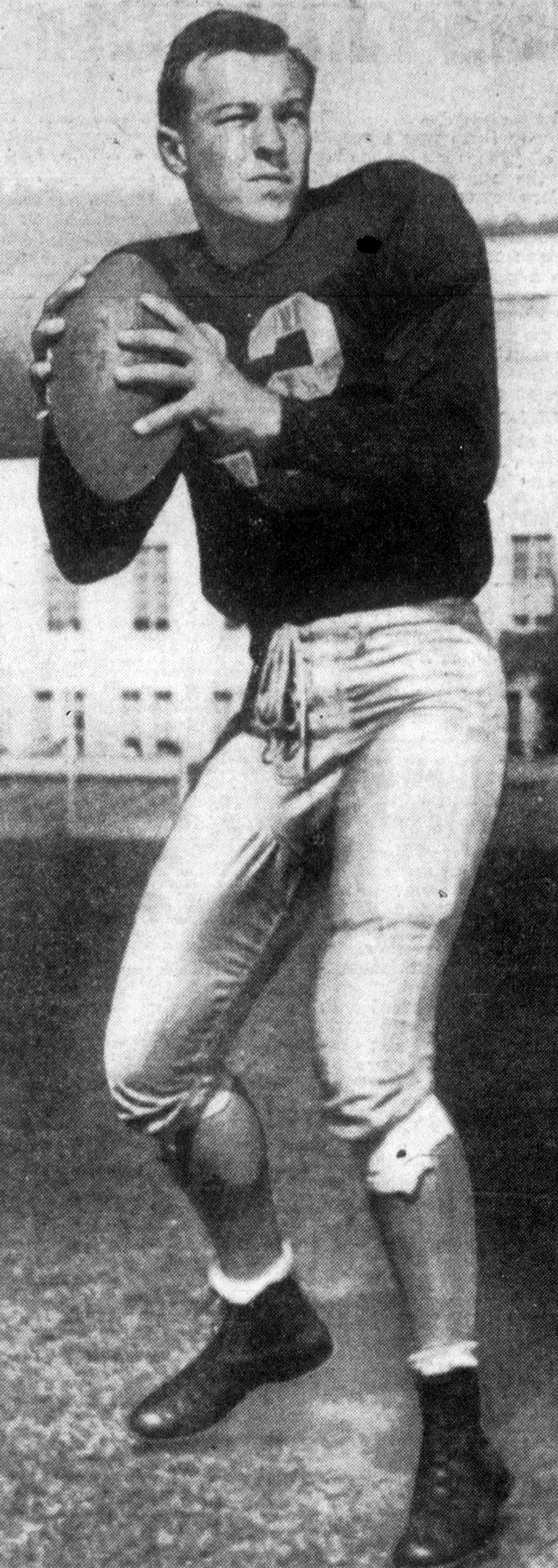
- Celeri, circa 1949

No. 17, 94
- Position: Quarterback

Personal information
- Born: June 1, 1927; Fort Bragg, California, U.S.
- Died: March 9, 1975 (aged 47); Buffalo, New York, U.S.
- Listed height: 5 ft 10 in (1.78 m)
- Listed weight: 180 lb (82 kg)

Career information
- High school: Fort Bragg
- College: California (1944, 1947–1949)
- NFL draft: 1950: 10th round, 127th overall pick

Career history
- New York Yanks (1951); Dallas Texans (1952); Hamilton Tiger-Cats (1953); Kitchener-Waterloo Dutchmen (1954-1959)

Awards and highlights
- 2× ORFU All-Star (1954, 1955); 2× ORFU Imperial Oil Trophy (1954, 1955); Second-team All-American (1949); First-team All-PCC (1949)

Career NFL statistics
- TD–INT: 15-18
- Passing yards: 2,287
- Passer rating: 60
- Stats at Pro Football Reference

Robert Lavern Celeri (June 1, 1927 – March 9, 1975) was a quarterback who played for the University of California, two seasons in the National Football League (NFL), and a total of eight seasons in two Canadian leagues – the Interprovincial Rugby Football Union (IRFU) and the Ontario Rugby Football Union (ORFU).

== Early life ==
Celeri was born in Fort Bragg, California to Hugo Celeri^{a} and Pearl Mable Bishop^{b} – he was the youngest of their three children, all boys. He attended the University of California where he played on the varsity football team for four seasons. His first season was 1944, however he lost playing time after being declared academically ineligible at the start of November, when the team still had four games left to play. He then served in the US Navy during 1945 and 1946. Celeri returned for the 1947 through 1949 seasons, with one of his teammates being Jackie Jensen, who went on to play professional baseball. The 1948 and 1949 football teams were both Pacific Coast Conference champions, and both teams played in (and lost) the Rose Bowl. During the 1949 season, Celeri passed for 1081 yards and was selected as MVP by his teammates. After the 1949 season concluded with a Rose Bowl loss, Celeri played in two additional games. The first was the Hula Bowl in Honolulu, where he helped the College All-Stars defeat an All-Hawaii team, and the second was a for-pay game matching Celeri against fellow-quarterback Eddie LeBaron of College of the Pacific, played at the Grape Bowl in Lodi, California, which Celeri's team lost 7–6 due to a missed extra point. He also had a baseball tryout with the Oakland Oaks of the Pacific Coast League in February 1950. He subsequently made one pinch-hitting appearance (drawing a walk) with the Salt Lake City Bees of the Pioneer League, before deciding to give up baseball for football – he was released by the Bees in May 1950.

== Professional career ==
=== United States ===
Celeri was selected 127th overall in the 10th round of the 1950 NFL draft by the San Francisco 49ers, and signed with them in June 1950. He was released by the team in early September, prior to their first regular season game. After sitting out the 1950 season, Celeri signed with the New York Yanks in July 1951. The 1951 Yanks had a record of 1–9–2 and finished last in the National Conference – Celeri played in 11 of their 12 games, passing for 1797 yards and rushing for 107 yards; he threw 12 touchdowns and 15 interceptions. He was an Honorable Mention for the 1951 All-Pro team. The Yanks franchise did not continue after the 1951 season, essentially being replaced by the Dallas Texans for the 1952 season. Celeri signed with the Texans in April 1952, becoming the first player to sign with the club. The 1952 Texans had a record of 1–11 and finished last in the National Conference – Celeri played in 8 of their 12 games, passing for 490 yards and rushing for 135 yards; he threw 3 touchdowns and 3 interceptions. During the season, Celeri was named in a paternity suit; and was later ordered to provide child support.

=== Canada ===
After the 1952 season, the Texans franchise was sold and became the Baltimore Colts. Rather than signing with the Colts, Celeri opted to play football in Canada – he signed with the Hamilton Tiger-Cats of the IRFU in June 1953. After the Tiger-Cats' first game of the regular season, in which he completed 3 of 8 passes, Celeri was released by the team.

After sitting out the remainder of the 1953 season, Celeri signed with the Kitchener-Waterloo Dutchmen of the ORFU in February 1954. He went on to play with the Dutchmen until the league folded in 1960. He was MVP of the ORFU in 1954 and 1955. Celeri was later inducted into the Waterloo Region Hall of Fame.

== Post-playing years ==
Celeri became head coach at Waterloo Lutheran University in 1960. In 1968, he joined the Buffalo Bills in a personnel role, working with head coach Harvey Johnson. Celeri died in 1975, at the age of 47 of an apparent heart attack; he was married and had two sons and a daughter.

== Notes ==
^a July 9, 1903 in Fort Bragg, California – January 15, 1965 in Mendocino County, California
^b December 18, 1904 in California – April 13, 1959 in San Francisco County, California
