= Willits High School =

Public secondary school in Willits, California (United States)

Location
- 299 North Main Street; Willits, Mendocino County, California 95490; United States; 39.4165°N 123.3540°W

Information
- Other name: WHS
- School type: Public, comprehensive high school
- Motto: Today determines tomorrow
- Established: September 1904; 122 years ago
- Status: Operating
- School district: Willits Unified School District
- Principal: Shane Topolinski
- Faculty: 27.56 (FTE)
- Grades: 9^{th} through 12^{th}
- Gender: Coeducational
- Enrollment: 415 (2022-23)
- Student to teacher ratio: 15.06
- Colors: Forest green and Gold
- Nickname: Wolverines
- Rival: Fort Bragg Timberwolves
- Website: whs.willitsunified.com

Willits High School is a high school located in Willits, California. The school first held classes in September 1904 in a room on the second floor of the Maize Mercantile Building on the corner of Main and Commercial Streets. Three years later, a new high school was built in the city's west hills at Pine and Maple Streets and classes were held there until a fire consumed the structure in November 1928. The next year construction commenced on a new campus at the school's present location near the center of town on North Main Street. It was first remodeled in 1958 and again more recently in 1988. In 1990, it was recognized as a California Distinguished School by the California Department of Education. The inaugural graduating class in 1904 consisted of just four students, while in 2008 that number had grown more than thirtyfold to 123, in relative proportion to the population growth of the community in that time.

== Athletics ==
Willits High School has teams in 14 sports: swimming, diving, track, basketball, cross country, baseball, football, golf, soccer, softball, cheerleading, tennis, volleyball, and wrestling. These teams compete as part of the CIF North Coast Section in the Coastal Mountain Conference's North Central League I. Their primary rivals in that league are the Fort Bragg High School Timberwolves.

== Student life ==
Student clubs and organizations at the school include:

- Associated Student Body
- California Scholarship Federation
- Drama Club
- Environmental Club
- Future Farmers of America
- Gay–straight alliance/Safe Haven
- Interact Club
- Las Razas Unidas, 'lit. The Races United'
- Leadership
- Odyssey of the Mind
- Peer Counseling
- Peer Health Education
- Poetry Team
- Youth for Christ
- Film Club
- Robotics Club

Spirit Weeks are held every season to unite the student body through shared activities. The anti-bullying organization Challenge Day comes to the school once a year and holds a day-long program, focusing on incoming freshmen. The goal of the program is to promote connection and understanding between students based on compassion, and embracing diversity.

Each academic year features at least four dances according to school tradition: Back to School (held outdoors during late summer, in the quad), Homecoming, Winter Ball, and the Prom Formal.

=== School song ===
Hail to Green and Gold,
Our colors lifted up to the sky,
We will never fail
To keep our banners waving on high.
Glory to our team,
Our fighting spirits ever prevail.
We will fight for Willits High,
And march on to gain our victory tonight!
