= Sonoma Academy =

Coordinates: 38°25′6″N 122°41′19″W

- Santa Rosa, California; United States

Information
- Type: Private coed college preparatory high school
- Established: 2001
- Head of school: Percy Abram
- Staff: 25
- Faculty: 45
- Enrollment: 310
- Colors: Gold and green
- Mascot: Coyote
- Website: http://www.sonomaacademy.org/

Sonoma Academy is a nonprofit, private co-ed college preparatory high school located in Santa Rosa, California in the United States. It is the only independent high school in Sonoma County. Founding Head of School Janet Durgin won a 2015 North Bay Business Journal Nonprofit Leadership Award.

== Academics ==
In 2016, 85% of teachers had an advanced degree. Sonoma Academy has a STEM program, with 5 math and science related AS courses. (Advanced Studies)

Students are required to take one of three foreign languages: Spanish, French or Mandarin. They must also take at least one class in the visual, musical or performing arts.

== Extra-curriculars ==
Sonoma Academy has 10 varsity athletic teams which compete in the NCS (North Coast Sectionals) League including soccer, baseball, basketball & tennis, as well as 4 junior varsity athletic teams. 57% of the student body participated in an organized sport during the 2015–16 school year.

The Sonoma Academy baseball team made national news in the spring of 2016 when the team tossed a national record 6 consecutive no hitters.

Students have the opportunity to participate in two main artistic performances each year: typically a musical in the fall and a theatrical performance in the spring. Past fall performances have included Urinetown, Much Ado About Nothing and American Idiot. In addition, many theater and music classes put on showcases at the end of each semester.

Students can be involved in parliamentary debate, policy debate, and other speech events. Debaters from SA won the 2014 Jon Schamber Invitational Tournament at the University of the Pacific, and 4 teams have gone to the Tournament of Champions. In 2016, the varsity parliamentary team was ranked third in the nation.

== Sexual harassment scandal ==
In June 2020, seven alumni of Sonoma Academy publicly accused the school of neglecting to address student reports that a long-time faculty member, Marco Morrone, had sexually harassed and groomed them. The victims launched a website under the name The Athena Project, and their claims were published in The Press Democrat. In response to their reports, Sonoma Academy hired the law firm Debevoise & Plimpton to investigate the alumni's claims. Lawyers from Debevoise & Plimpton interviewed 133 people and reviewed 61,000 documents for their report. Their report concluded that “Morrone engaged in inappropriate boundary crossing with at least 34 students between the classes of 2005 and 2021 while he was employed by SA.” The report also stated, "Debevoise concludes that SA administrators showed a pattern of dismissing students’ concerns, at least in some circumstances implicitly blaming them for the uncomfortable interactions they reported, and often accepting Morrone’s version of events without any challenge.”

After over a year of engagement with Sonoma Academy's representatives through a restorative justice process, the Athena Project announced in December 2022 that they planned to file a lawsuit against the school to avoid the statute of limitations barring their potential claims. They invited other victims/survivors to join their complaint and retained Los Angeles law firm Allred, Maroko, & Goldberg to represent them. On December 30, 2022, twelve women filed suit in Sonoma County Superior Court against Sonoma Academy, two former teachers, and two former administrators. The suit alleges negligence on the part of Sonoma Academy, as well as “cover-up of incidents of sexual assault and sexual harassment of...female students by...faculty and male students.”

== Campus dogs ==
Sonoma Academy has many "campus dogs". There is Reba, a black Labrador retriever who is an emotional therapy dog; Josie, a yellow Labrador retriever; Bento, a fawn pug; Jojo, a mixed-breed terrier; Freckles, a Pomeranian; Maggie, a goldendoodle; Jasper, a Havanese mix; Panxho, a miniature poodle; Moby, a Boston terrier; Charlotte, a miniature poodle mix; Panda, a black lab; and Champ, the unofficial "Head of School."
