= Middletown High School (California) =

Coordinates: 38.7558950°N 122.6145945°W

Location
- 20932 Big Canyon Rd. Middletown, California 95461; United States

Information
- Type: Public high school
- Established: 1919
- School district: Middletown Unified School District
- Principal: Carlos McKinney
- Teaching staff: 25.66 (FTE)
- Grades: 9-12
- Enrollment: 406 (2023–2024)
- Student to teacher ratio: 15.82
- Campus type: Rural
- Colors: Purple and gold
- Mascot: Mustangs
- Newspaper: MHS Fresh Print
- Website: http://mhs.middletownusd.org/

Middletown High School (MHS) is a small public high school located in Middletown, California, United States. It is the only comprehensive high school in the Middletown Unified School District.

== Academics ==
MHS offers AP courses in English literature, calculus, environmental science, U.S. history, and Spanish language. It has an agriculture department, as well as nine ROP (vocational) courses.

MHS's graduation rate is 94.59%. 37.9% of the class of 2011 completed the college prep UC/CSU (a)-(g) requirements.

== Extracurricular activities ==
Student groups and organizations include student government, Interact Club, Drama Club,Future Farmers of America, United States Academic Decathlon, Mock Trial

Athletic activities include football, volleyball, cross country, cheerleading, soccer, basketball, wrestling, baseball, softball, track, tennis, golf, and E-sports

== Demographics ==
Middletown High's student body is 72.8% white, 19.5% Hispanic or Latino, 2.5% of two or more races, 1.6% American Indian or Alaska Native, 1.4% Native Hawaiian or Pacific Islander, 1.0% black or African American, 0.8% Asian, and 0.6% Filipino. 37.0% of students are socioeconomically disadvantaged, while 5.6% are English learners.
