= Transitional kindergarten =

Transitional kindergarten (abbreviated TK) is a California school grade that serves as a bridge between preschool and kindergarten, to provide students with time to develop fundamental skills needed for success in school in a setting that is appropriate to the student's age and development. Transitional kindergarten is also available in some schools in other states and can serve as a stepping-stone between preschool and kindergarten, especially for children with birthdates close to their state's kindergarten cutoff date.

== Implementation ==
The grade was created by the Kindergarten Readiness Act (SB 1381), which was authored by Senator Joseph Simitian and Senate President-pro-Tem Darrell Steinberg, and signed into law in 2010 by Gov. Schwarzenegger. The act also changed California's kindergarten entry date from December 2 to September 1, so that around 95% of children will have reached five years of age on the first day of kindergarten (any time in mid/late August), and those few that haven't yet would complete the fifth year at least soon after the first day. Transitional kindergarten is a part of the public school system and is free for families. Classes are taught by teachers from the K–12 system. Existing funding for these children with fall birthdays that would have been eligible for kindergarten under the previous kindergarten entry dates is redirected to transitional kindergarten and used to employ existing teachers and classroom facilities.

AIR, the American Institutes for Research, recently released a report on the first year of statewide TK, which finds that 89% of districts reported they offered transitional kindergarten, representing 96% of the state's kindergarten population. An estimated 39,000 four-year-olds were served in the first year of implementation.

== See also ==
- Pre-kindergarten
