= Cleone, California =

Cleone
- Census-designated place
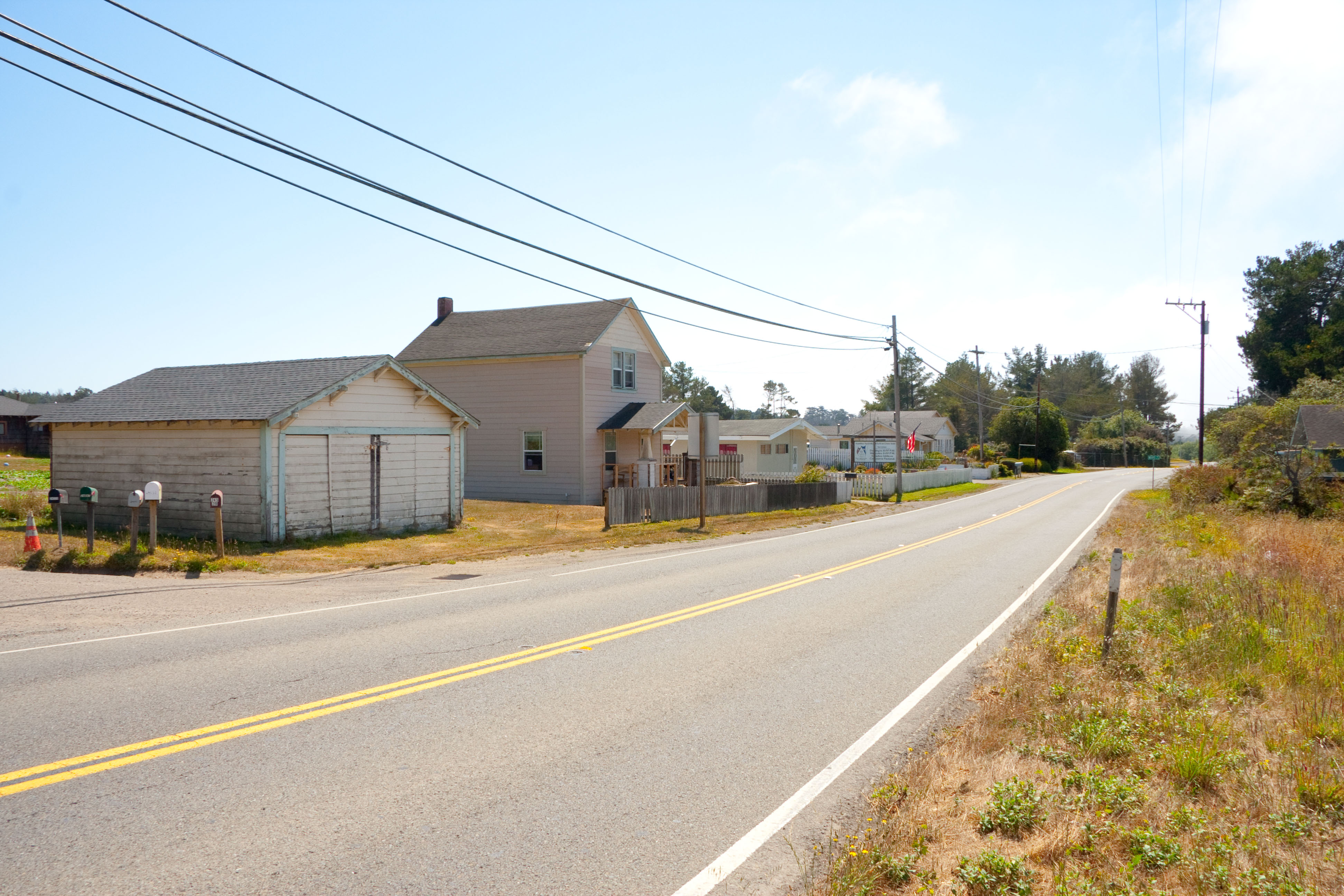
- Along State Highway 1 in Cleone

- Location in Mendocino County and California

- Location within California Location within the United States
- Coordinates: 39°29′24″N 123°47′08″W
- Country: United States
- State: California
- County: Mendocino

Area
  - Total: 1.62 sq mi (4.2 km^{2})
  - Land: 1.59 sq mi (4.1 km^{2})
  - Water: 0.02 sq mi (0.052 km^{2}) 1.50%
- Elevation: 79 ft (24 m)

Population (2020)
  - Total: 622
  - Density: 390.46/sq mi (150.76/km^{2})
- Time zone: UTC-8 (Pacific (PST))
  - Summer (DST): UTC-7 (PDT)
- ZIP Code: 95437 (Fort Bragg)
- Area code: 707
- GNIS feature IDs: 1655905; 2628718

Cleone (formerly Kanuck) is a census-designated place in Mendocino County, California, United States. It is located 3.25 miles (5.2 km) north-northeast of Fort Bragg on California State Highway 1, at an elevation of 79 feet (24 m). It most likely takes its name from Kelio, a division or village of the Pomo people. The population was 622 at the 2020 census.

The Kanuck post office opened in 1883, changed its name to Cleone in 1883, and closed in 1908. In 1883, a sawmill was constructed about 1.5 miles (2.4 km) east of the village of Cleone. Wood products were shipped from a wharf at the place. Railroad cars ran down the hill to the chute by gravity and were returned by horses.

The main entrance to MacKerricher State Park is in Cleone.

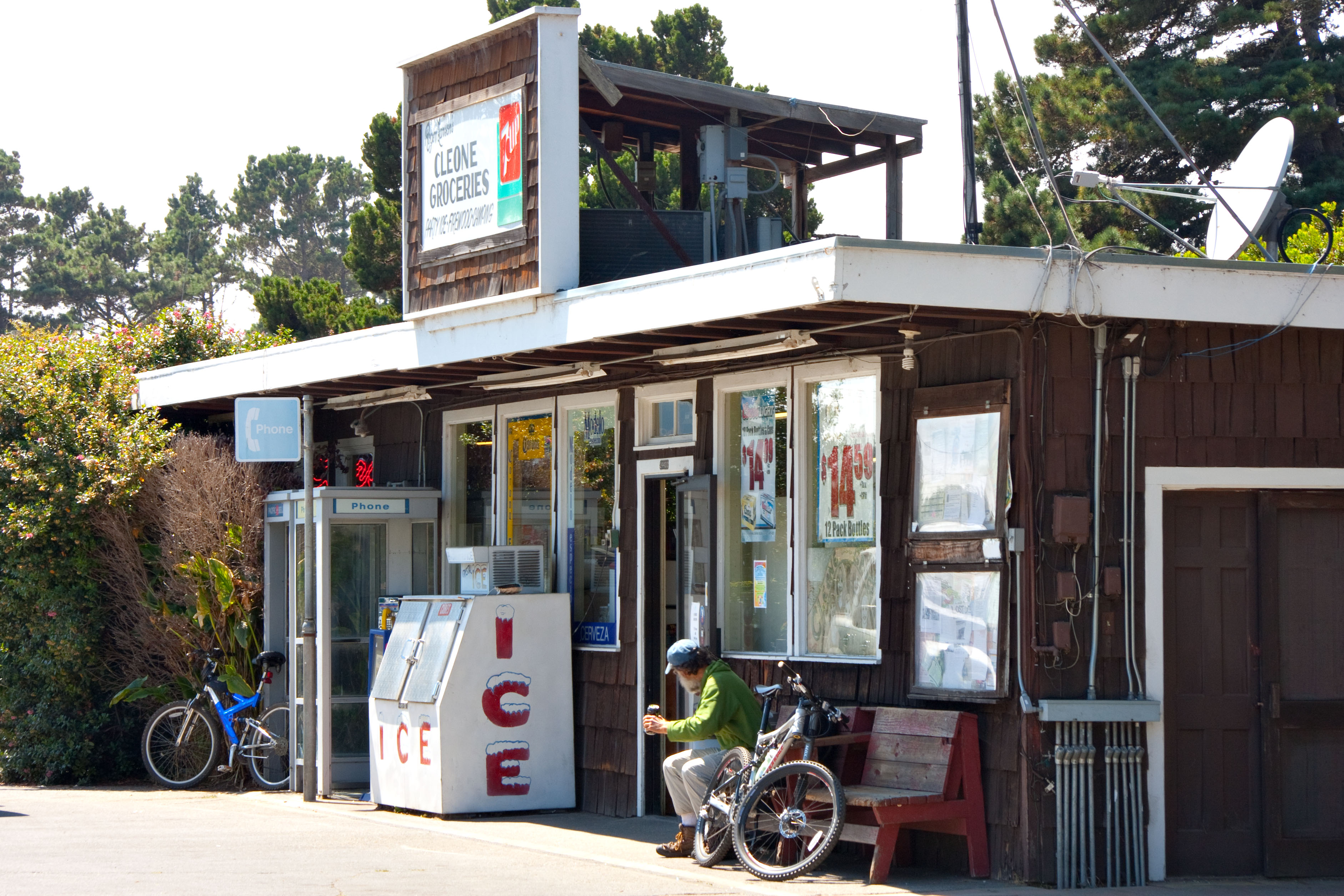
Cleone grocery store

== Geography ==
According to the United States Census Bureau, the CDP covers an area of 1.6 square miles (4.1 km^{2}), of which 0.02 square miles (0.05 km^{2}), or 1.50%, are water.

== Demographics ==
Historical population
Census	Pop.	Note	%±
2010	618		—
2020	622		0.6%
U.S. Decennial Census; 1850–1870 1880-1890; 1900 1910 1920; 1930 1940 1950; 1960 1970 1980; 1990 2000 2010

=== 2020 census ===
As of the 2020 census, Cleone had a population of 622. The population density was 390.5 inhabitants per square mile (150.8/km^{2}). The median age was 48.0 years. The age distribution was 123 people (19.8%) under the age of 18, 34 people (5.5%) aged 18 to 24, 137 people (22.0%) aged 25 to 44, 152 people (24.4%) aged 45 to 64, and 176 people (28.3%) who were 65 years of age or older. For every 100 females there were 101.3 males, and for every 100 females age 18 and over there were 107.9 males age 18 and over. The entire population lived in rural areas.

The whole population lived in households. There were 273 households, of which 48 (17.6%) had children under the age of 18 living in them. Of all households, 142 (52.0%) were married-couple households, 13 (4.8%) were cohabiting couple households, 65 (23.8%) had a female householder with no spouse or partner present, and 53 (19.4%) had a male householder with no spouse or partner present. 85 households (31.1%) were made up of individuals, and 54 (19.8%) had someone living alone who was 65 years of age or older. The average household size was 2.28. There were 173 families (63.4% of all households).

There were 337 housing units at an average density of 211.6 units per square mile (81.7 units/km^{2}), of which 273 (81.0%) were occupied. Of the occupied units, 207 (75.8%) were owner-occupied and 66 (24.2%) were occupied by renters. The homeowner vacancy rate was 4.1% and the rental vacancy rate was 5.6%.

Racial composition as of the 2020 census
Race	Number	Percent
White	425	68.3%
Black or African American	1	0.2%
American Indian and Alaska Native	15	2.4%
Asian	3	0.5%
Native Hawaiian and Other Pacific Islander	0	0.0%
Some other race	87	14.0%
Two or more races	91	14.6%
Hispanic or Latino (of any race)	182	29.3%

=== 2010 census ===
Cleone first appeared as a census designated place in the 2010 U.S. census.

== Politics ==
In the state legislature, Cleone is in the 2nd senatorial district, represented by Democrat Mike McGuire, and the 2nd Assembly district, represented by Democrat Chris Rogers.

Federally, Cleone is in California's 2nd congressional district, represented by Democrat Jared Huffman.

== Education ==
Cleone is in the Fort Bragg Unified School District. The comprehensive high school is Fort Bragg High School.
