= Clear Lake High School (California) =

Public school in Lakeport, California, US

Location
- 350 Lange St. Lakeport, Lake County, California 95453; United States; 39.0538°N 122.9164°W

Information
- School type: Public, Comprehensive high school
- Established: 1901
- Status: Open
- School district: Lakeport Unified School District
- NCES District ID: 0620670
- Educational authority: California Department of Education
- Oversight: Mendocino County Office of Education
- Superintendent: Jill Falconer
- School code: CA-17-64030-1732304
- CEEB code: 051345
- NCES School ID: 062067002484
- Principal: Jennifer Scheel
- Teaching staff: 22.57 (FTE)
- Grades: 9–12
- Gender: Co-educational
- Enrollment: 336 (2023–2024)
- Student to teacher ratio: 14.89
- Color
- Athletics conference: CIF North Coast Section, Coastal Mountain Conference, North Central I League
- Nickname: Cardinal
- Rival: Kelseyville High School (Knights)
- Website: www.lakeportusd.org/apps/pages/index.jsp?uREC_ID=561567&type=d
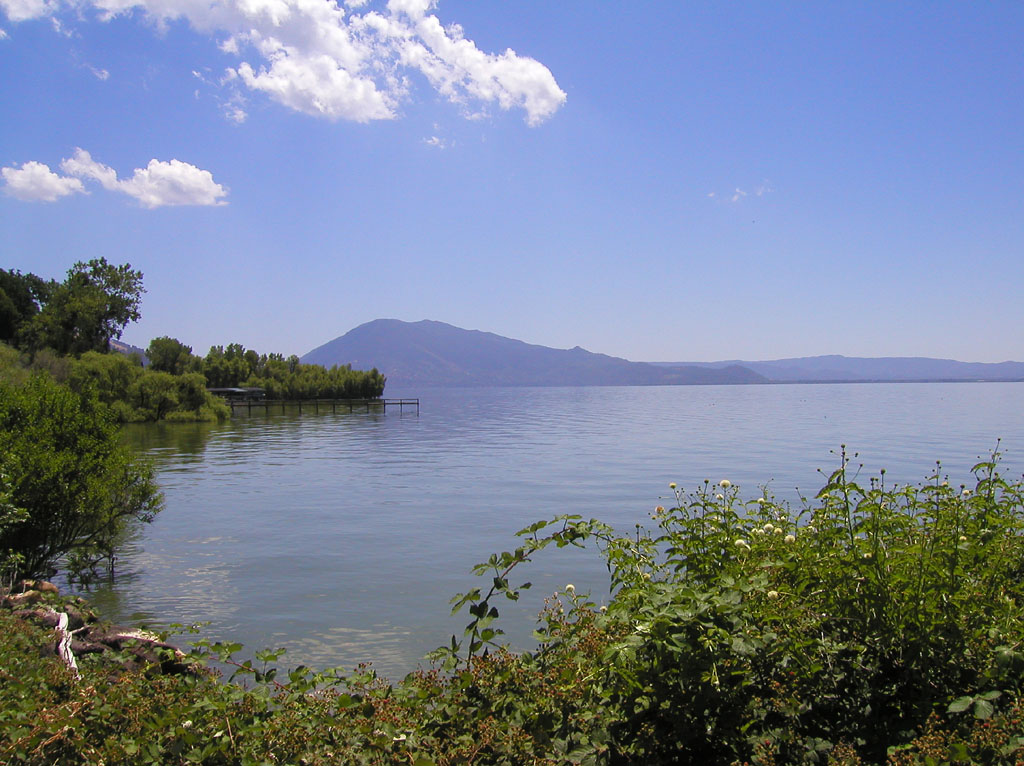
- Clear Lake, for which the school is named

Clear Lake High School (CLHS) is a public high school located in Lakeport, California, United States. It is the only comprehensive high school in the Lakeport Unified School District. Situated on the shore of Clear Lake, it is the oldest school in Lake County. It was named a California Distinguished School in 2011.

== Academics ==
Clear Lake High School has AP programs in biology, calculus, English language, English literature, and U.S. history. ROP classes include computers, photo, and wood shop. In 2011-12, 55% of sophomores passed the English portion of the CAHSEE and 53% passed the math portion. It had a 91.3% graduation rate in 2010-11.

== Extracurricular activities ==
CLHS hosts a chapter of the California Scholarship Federation (CSF). Other student organizations include the Anime Club, the Style Club, the Latino Club, the Be the Change Club, and the Interact Club.

Clear Lake hosts a variety of sports, including football, volleyball, cheer, soccer, cross country, basketball, wrestling, track, softball, tennis, baseball, and swimming.

Clear Lake's baseball team finished the 2015 season 26–1 losing its only game of the year in the Division V semi-finals to Head Royce of Oakland 7-3 finishing one of the most successful season's in Clear Lake baseball history.

Clear Lake's boys basketball team finished the 2018–2019 season with a record of 27–4 setting school records for the most wins in the school's boys basketball programs history and advancing the furthest of any boys team in the NorCal state playoffs after losing in the quarterfinal round of the Division V bracket to Lincoln HS, a Division 1 school out of San Francisco. They finished undefeated in the North Central League 1 with a 14–0 record and lost in the semi-finals of the North Coast Section Division V playoffs to University HS out of San Francisco, the eventual D-V section champion and State Division III runner up.

In the 2019–2020 season the boys basketball team finished again with an undefeated record in the North Central League 1 with a 14–0 record and advanced one game further in the North Coast Section Division V playoffs - this time losing in the finals to Stuart Hall High School out of San Francisco. After being seeded 10th in the Division IV NorCal bracket they traveled to Kingsburg, CA upsetting Kingsburg High School 66–53 before falling in the quarterfinals to Lincoln High School out of San Francisco for the second year in a row. They finished the season with an overall record of 27–5 for back to back 27 win seasons.

== Demographics ==
In 2011–12, the Clear Lake High School student body was 61.2% white, 24.3% Hispanic or Latino, 4.4% American Indian or Alaska Native, 1.0% Black or African American, .8% Asian, .8% Filipino, and .4% Native Hawaiian or Pacific Islander. 6.8% of students were two or more races. 50.4% of students were socioeconomically disadvantaged, and 6.6% were English learners.
