= Middletown Unified School District =

School district in California, United States

Location
- Lake County, California

District information
- Type: Public
- Motto: Expectations and Performance Empower Success
- Grades: K-12
- Superintendent: Thad Owens
- Schools: 10

Students and staff
- Students: 1,715

Other information
- Website: www.middletownusd.org

Middletown Unified School District is a school district located in Lake County, California.

== Schools ==
Middletown Unified School District contains the following schools.

=== Elementary schools ===
- Cobb Mountain Elementary School
- Coyote Valley Elementary School
- Minnie Cannon Elementary School

=== Middle schools ===
- Middletown Middle School

=== High schools ===
- Loconoma Valley High School
- Middletown High School

=== Community Day Schools ===
- Middletown Community Day School
- Middletown Elementary Community Day School
