= Middletown, California =

Middletown
- Unincorporated Community; Census Designated Place
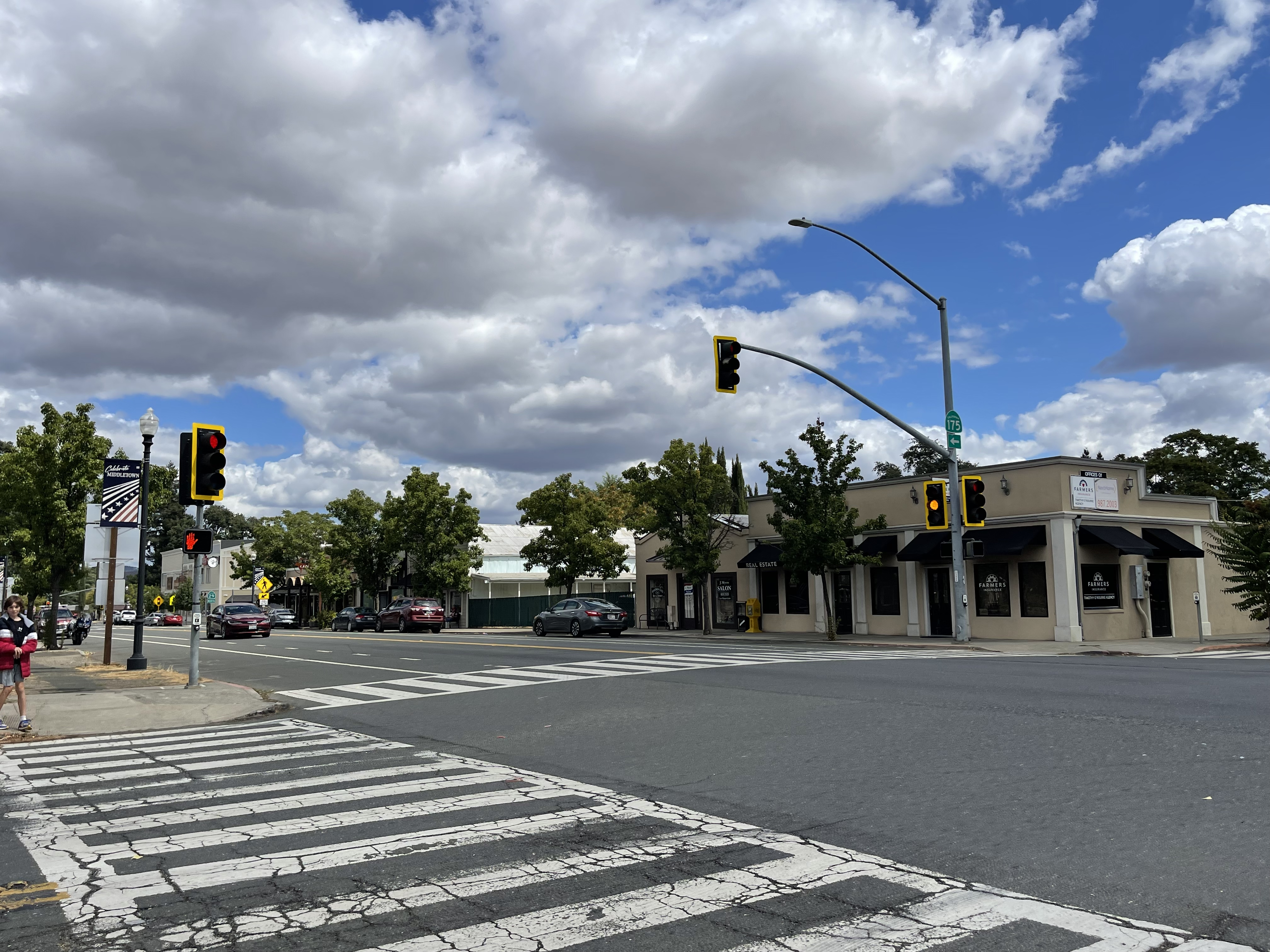
- Middletown in September 2023

- Location within Lake County and the State of California
- Coordinates: 38°45′09″N 122°36′54″W
- Country: United States
- State: California
- County: Lake

Area
  - Total: 1.844 sq mi (4.776 km^{2})
  - Land: 1.844 sq mi (4.776 km^{2})
  - Water: 0 sq mi (0 km^{2}) 0%
- Elevation: 1,099 ft (335 m)

Population (2020)
  - Total: 1,114
  - Density: 604.1/sq mi (233.2/km^{2})
- Time zone: UTC-8 (Pacific (PST))
  - Summer (DST): UTC-7 (PDT)
- ZIP code: 95461
- Area code: 707
- FIPS code: 06-47332
- GNIS feature IDs: 228626

Middletown is a census-designated place (CDP) in Lake County, California, United States. Its population was 1,114 at the 2020 census, down from 1,323 at the 2010 census, which was up from 1,020 at the 2000 census. Middletown was given its name because it is halfway between Lower Lake and Calistoga, which is 17 miles (27 km) to the south. The town was severely damaged by the 2015 Valley Fire.

== History ==
At one time, the community was known as Middle Station, and was a halfway point on the stagecoach route over Mt. St. Helena from Calistoga to Lower Lake. The first house was built at the site by J.H. Berry in 1870. The town began in 1871. The Middleton post office opened in 1871 and changed its name to Middletown in 1875. Middletown enjoyed a robust quicksilver (mercury) mining industry through the end of the 19th century. By the early 1900s, cattle and sheep ranching were prominent, along with some limited pear and walnut production. A resort economy sprung up around the various natural springs, and the area around Middletown attracted vacationers from the Bay Area through the 1950s. Many of the resorts closed in the 1960s. In the 1970s and early 1980s, exploitation of nearby geothermal energy resources brought an influx of workers into the local economy. Electrical power plants powered by "steam wells" were built in the mountains above Middletown. As housing prices in the Bay Area increased in the late 20th century, Middletown and nearby Hidden Valley Lake enjoyed a population boom as commuters moved to the Middletown area looking for affordable housing. Nearby tourism includes Harbin Hot Springs and the Twin Pine Casino located on the local Rancheria south of the town. A large resort, 2 miles (3.2 km) southeast of town, was proposed in 2020, consisting of low-density residential development, preserved open space, retail space, restaurants, and several boutique hotels.

=== 2015 Valley Fire ===
In the late afternoon and early evening hours of September 12, 2015, about half the town, including city blocks, commercial buildings and an apartment complex, was destroyed by the fast-moving Valley Fire. The town was directly in the path of the advancing fire, and suffered a "devastating blow".

=== 2019 Kincade Fire ===
The 2019 Kincade Fire started in Sonoma County and at some point prompted mandatory evacuations in Lake County.

== Geography ==
Middletown has an elevation of 1,099 feet (335 m). According to the United States Census Bureau, the CDP has a total area of 1.8 square miles (4.7 km^{2}), all land.

=== Climate ===
This region experiences hot and dry summers, with average summer monthly temperatures above 97 °F (36 °C). According to the Köppen Climate Classification system, Middletown has a warm-summer Mediterranean climate, abbreviated Csb on climate maps.

== Demographics ==
Historical population
Census	Pop.	Note	%±
2000	1,020		—
2010	1,323		29.7%
2020	1,114		−15.8%
U.S. Decennial Census; 1860–1870 1880-1890; 1900 1910 1920; 1930 1940 1950; 1960 1970 1980; 1990 2000 2010

Middletown first appeared as a census designated place in the 2000 U.S. census.

=== Racial and ethnic composition ===
Race and Ethnicity
Racial and ethnic composition	2000	2010	2020
White (non-Hispanic)	70.98%	62.51%	59.16%
Hispanic or Latino (of any race)	22.84%	31.22%	34.74%
Two or more races (non-Hispanic)	2.45%	3.1%	4.04%
Asian (non-Hispanic)	1.67%	1.28%	0.81%
Native American (non-Hispanic)	1.18%	1.44%	0.63%
Other (non-Hispanic)	0.0%	0.08%	0.36%
Black or African American (non-Hispanic)	0.39%	0.38%	0.18%
Pacific Islander (non-Hispanic)	0.49%	0.0%	0.09%

=== 2020 census ===
As of the 2020 census, Middletown had a population of 1,114. The population density was 604.1 inhabitants per square mile (233.2/km^{2}). The racial makeup of Middletown was 701 (62.9%) White, 2 (0.2%) African American, 13 (1.2%) Native American, 9 (0.8%) Asian, 1 (0.1%) Pacific Islander, 184 (16.5%) from other races, and 204 (18.3%) from two or more races. Hispanic or Latino of any race were 387 persons (34.7%).

The census reported that 1,100 people (98.7% of the population) lived in households, 14 (1.3%) lived in non-institutionalized group quarters, and no one was institutionalized. 0.0% of residents lived in urban areas, while 100.0% lived in rural areas.

There were 426 households, out of which 157 (36.9%) had children under the age of 18 living in them, 187 (43.9%) were married-couple households, 31 (7.3%) were cohabiting couple households, 119 (27.9%) had a female householder with no partner present, and 89 (20.9%) had a male householder with no partner present. 114 households (26.8%) were one person, and 45 (10.6%) were one person aged 65 or older. The average household size was 2.58. There were 288 families (67.6% of all households).

The age distribution was 250 people (22.4%) under the age of 18, 77 people (6.9%) aged 18 to 24, 245 people (22.0%) aged 25 to 44, 343 people (30.8%) aged 45 to 64, and 199 people (17.9%) who were 65 years of age or older. The median age was 43.4 years. For every 100 females, there were 101.8 males, and for every 100 females age 18 and over there were 100.5 males age 18 and over.

There were 472 housing units at an average density of 256.0 units per square mile (98.8 units/km^{2}), of which 426 (90.3%) were occupied and 46 (9.7%) were vacant. Of occupied units, 264 (62.0%) were owner-occupied, and 162 (38.0%) were occupied by renters. The homeowner vacancy rate was 1.1% and the rental vacancy rate was 0.6%.

=== 2010 census ===
At the 2010 census Middletown had a population of 1,323. The population density was 717.4 inhabitants per square mile (277.0/km^{2}). The racial makeup of Middletown was 985 (74.5%) White, 5 (0.4%) African American, 28 (2.1%) Native American, 18 (1.4%) Asian, 0 (0.0%) Pacific Islander, 225 (17.0%) from other races, and 62 (4.7%) from two or more races. Hispanic or Latino of any race were 413 people (31.2%).

The census reported that 1,317 people (99.5% of the population) lived in households, 6 (0.5%) lived in non-institutionalized group quarters, and no one was institutionalized.

There were 508 households; 189 (37.2%) had children under the age of 18 living in them, 223 (43.9%) were opposite-sex married couples living together, 72 (14.2%) had a female householder with no husband present, 41 (8.1%) had a male householder with no wife present. There were 36 (7.1%) unmarried opposite-sex partnerships, and 4 (0.8%) same-sex married couples or partnerships. 140 households (27.6%) consisted of a single person and 52 (10.2%) had someone living alone who was 65 or older. The average household size was 2.59. There were 336 families (66.1% of households); the average family size was 3.15.

The age distribution was 376 people (28.4%) under the age of 18, 114 people (8.6%) aged 18 to 24, 309 people (23.4%) aged 25 to 44, 374 people (28.3%) aged 45 to 64, and 150 people (11.3%) who were 65 or older. The median age was 37.4 years. For every 100 females, there were 102.9 males. For every 100 females age 18 and over, there were 103.2 males.

There were 557 housing units at an average density of 302.0 per square mile; of the occupied units, 251 (49.4%) were owner-occupied and 257 (50.6%) were rented. The homeowner vacancy rate was 3.8% and the rental vacancy rate was 4.1%. 659 people (49.8% of the population) lived in owner-occupied housing units and 658 people (49.7%) lived in rental housing units.

=== 2000 census ===
At the 2000 census, the median household income was $35,278 and the median family income was $38,571. Males had a median income of $33,214 versus $26,515 for females. The per capita income for the CDP was $14,135. About 21.2% of families and 20.9% of the population were below the poverty line, including 22.1% of those under age 18 and 28.3% of those age 65 or over.

== Education ==
Middletown Unified School District serves as the Middletown and Hidden Valley Lake area's school district. Middletown High School and Middletown Middle School share a campus. Middletown Adventist School is a Christian K-8 school also in the area.

== Tourist attractions ==
Harbin Hot Springs, a New Age retreat center with spring pools, conference facilities, daily activities and classes, is located northwest of town. The Hot Springs were decimated by the 2015 California wildfires.

The Middletown Rancheria, an Indian reservation of Pomo, Lake Miwok, Wappo, and Wintu, is located just south of town and is home to a tribal casino as well as a tribal gas station which brings in people from around the area for its comparatively low prices.

There is a small art museum open 10:30 am - 5:00 pm, for the exception of Tuesdays and Wednesdays. There is also a public pool open during summer in the community.

== Government ==
In the California State Legislature, Middletown is in the 2nd senatorial district, represented by Democrat Mike McGuire, and in the 4th Assembly district, represented by Democrat Cecilia Aguiar-Curry.

In the United States House of Representatives, Middletown is in California's 4th congressional district, represented by Democrat Mike Thompson.

Lake County is divided into five supervisorial districts, and Middletown is in District 1. As of January 2025 " Helen Owens is the supervisor for District 1.
