= Community day school =

School for high-risk students operated by the local public school authority

- California; United States

Information
- Type: Day Schools

Community Day Schools in California are operated by school districts. Community day schools serve students referred by a School Attendance Review Board, and other high-risk youths. Community day schools are a type of opportunity school. Community Day schools should not be confused with County Community Schools which are run by County Offices of Education, and serve students who have been expelled from a school district within the county.

== Program information ==
The 360-minute minimum instructional day includes academic programs that provide challenging curriculum and individual attention to student learning modalities and abilities. Community day school programs also focus on the development of pro-social skills and student self-esteem and resiliency.

Community day schools are intended to have low student-teacher ratios. Students benefit from learning support services that include school counselors and psychologists, academic and vocational counselors, and pupil discipline personnel. Students also receive collaborative services from county offices of education, law enforcement, probation, and human services agency personnel who work with at-risk youth.

Community day schools are supported by supplemental apportionment for community day school attendance, in addition to base revenue funding.

== Accountability ==
Initially, the Alternative Schools Accountability Model (ASAM) provided accountability for educational options schools serving very high-risk, highly-mobile students. These schools include community day, continuation, opportunity, county community, juvenile court, Division of Juvenile Justice, and other alternative schools that meet stringent criteria set by the California State Board of Education (SBE). ASAM was discontinued due to changes in the accountability system, which were brought about by the Local Control Funding Formula (LCFF) in 2013. ASAM was replaced by the Dashboard Alternative School Status (DASS), which is currently under revision.

== Law for Community Day Schools ==
Selected California Education Code sections

== California school directory ==
California School Directory
