= Kitchener-Waterloo Dutchmen (football) =

General information
- Founded: 1953; 73 years ago
- Folded: 1959; 67 years ago
- Stadium: Victoria Park
- Headquartered: Kitchener, Ontario
- Colours: Green, Red, White

Personnel
- Owner: Unknown

Nickname
- Dutchies

League / conference affiliations
- Ontario Rugby Football Union; Senior & Intermediate

The Kitchener-Waterloo Dutchmen were a professional-amateur Canadian football team competing in the Ontario Rugby Football Union (ORFU), based in Kitchener, Ontario. They played their home games at Victoria Park. They experienced regular success in the ORFU, winning four consecutive titles from 1954 to 1957, after which, pro-am teams were barred from competing for the Grey Cup, which preceded the formation of the fully-professional Canadian Football League a year later in 1958. They competed for two more years until folding in 1959.

The Dutchmen played in the ORFU from 1953 to 1959, with significant success achieved with quarterback Bob Celeri and coach Harvey Johnson. The Dutchmen were the last ORFU team to have competed for the Grey Cup, losing to the Edmonton Eskimos in a semi-final game in 1954. The following year, ORFU teams would discontinue competing for the national championship title after it became apparent that the ORFU could no longer be competitive in those games. The Dutchmen ceased operations after the 1959 season, just one year before senior play in the ORFU would be discontinued.

The Kitchener-Waterloo Dutchmen shared their team name and identity with a men's senior hockey team. Professional sports in Kitchener-Waterloo was spearheaded by the Kitchener Sports Association, founded in 1944, who built the Kitchener Memorial Auditorium Complex from 1951 to 1967. A dedicated football field, Centennial Stadium, was built as part of the complex in 1967 with a 3,200-seat grandstand, but ultimately never saw a professional or pro-am team return to the city. The grandstand was demolished in 2012.

== Seasons ==
Season	W	L	T	PF	PA	Pts	Finish	Playoffs
1953	8	4	0	218	178	16	1st, ORFU	Lost ORFU Finals
1954	9	2	1	269	183	19	1st, ORFU	Won ORFU Finals; Lost Grey Cup Semi-Final
1955	10	1	1	284	124	21	1st, ORFU	Won ORFU Finals
1956	8	3	0	299	170	16	1st, ORFU	Won ORFU Finals
1957	8	3	1	280	153	17	2nd, ORFU	Won ORFU Finals
1958	4	6	0	210	261	12	3rd, ORFU	Missed playoffs
1959	6	5	0	275	170	14	3rd, ORFU	Lost ORFU Semi-Final
