= Lakeport, California =

City in California, United States

- City
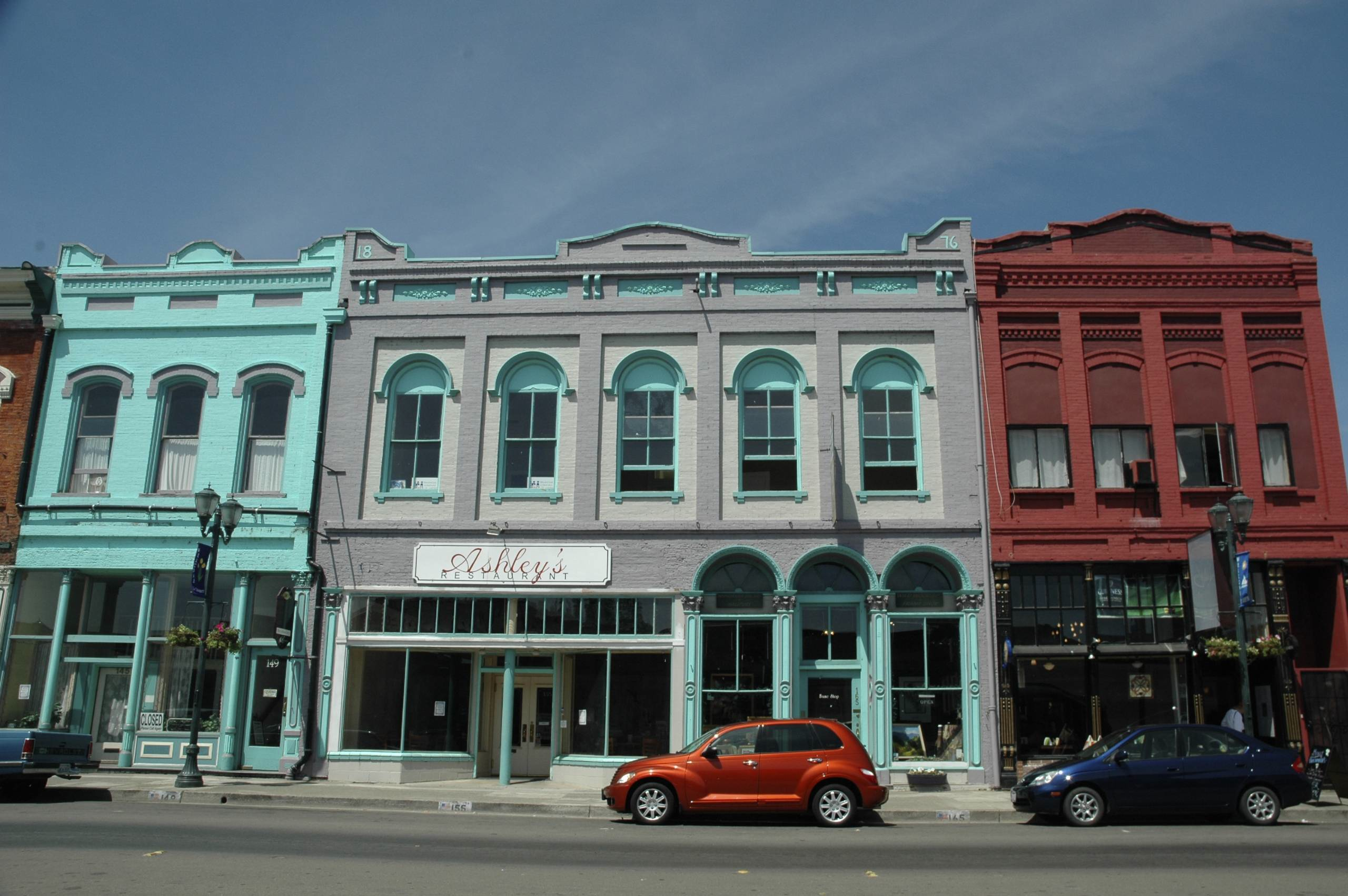
- Main Street
- Interactive map of Lakeport, California
- Location within California Location within the United States
- Coordinates: 39°02′35″N 122°54′57″W
- Country: United States
- State: California
- County: Lake
- Incorporated: April 30, 1888

Government
  - Type: Council–manager government
  - Mayor: Brandon Disney
  - City manager: Kevin Ingram

Area
  - Total: 3.20 sq mi (8.28 km^{2})
  - Land: 3.06 sq mi (7.92 km^{2})
  - Water: 0.14 sq mi (0.36 km^{2}) 46.53%
- Elevation: 1,355 ft (413 m)

Population (2020)
  - Total: 5,026
  - Density: 1,642.48/sq mi (634.17/km^{2})
- Time zone: UTC-08:00 (PST)
  - Summer (DST): UTC-07:00 (PDT)
- ZIP code: 95453
- Area code: 707
- FIPS code: 06-39710
- GNIS feature ID: 0277536
- Website: cityoflakeport.com

Lakeport is a city in and the county seat of Lake County, California, United States. The city is 125 miles (201 km) northwest of Sacramento. Lakeport is situated on the western shore of Clear Lake, at an elevation of 1,355 feet (413 m). The population was 5,026 at the 2020 census, up from 4,753 at the 2010 census.

== History ==
Former names include Forbestown, Rocky Point, Stony Point, Tuckertown, and Kaci-Badon.

Lakeport was first settled by American Indians several thousand years ago. At the coming of the settlers, the Kabe-napos, a subtribe of the Pomo people, lived here within their main village. The village name was Kaci-Badon, after the water lily plant Kaci, and badon, which was the native name for 'island'.

The first business in Lakeport was established in 1855, trading goods to the local Indians in exchange for their wares and baskets. The business was run by a man named Johnson, but he did not have a store location. The first shop built in the Lakeport area was constructed by Dr. Boynton.

It was William Forbes and James Parrish, however, who created the first shop in the main Lakeport area. Parish was a blacksmith and Forbes was a wagon maker. Forbes was also a pioneer undertaker. It was this investment as well as the land grant Forbes bestowed upon the county, which earned Lakeport its first name: Forbestown.

William Forbes came to the area in 1858. He purchased 160 acres (0.6 km^{2}) on which to build his home and farm. When the county was investigating land to put the local county seat, Forbes offered 40 acres (160,000 m^{2}) of his property on which they could build the county office. The electorate thanked Forbes for his generosity by naming the town after him. Although the town no longer bears his name, other landmarks still retain their name association to him.

On June 14, 1861, Forbestown was officially renamed to Lakeport. Some locations still bear the Forbes name, however, such as Forbes Creek and Forbes Street.

In 1850, Captain Nathaniel Lyon led an attack in the Bloody Island massacre. Lyon later died fighting for the Union in the Civil War.

The first post office, called Big Valley, opened at the site in 1858, and changed its name to Lakeport in 1861.

The first Lakeport courthouse was built of wood in 1861. The building burnt under suspicious circumstances in 1867.

In 1864, the Cache Creek Dam was built. Four years later, the locals tore down the dam and destroyed the mills it helped operate, after waters diverted by the dam flooded most of Lower Lake and Anderson Ranch.

In 1872, a sighting of the legendary "Monster of Blue Lakes" or "Devil Fish" caused Indians from all around to gather at Temescal to await an expected calamity.

In 1882, Black Bart robbed the stagecoach traveling between Lakeport and Cloverdale. During this time period, over 450 Chinese immigrants were employed to work the area's quicksilver mines.

In 1883, William "Digger" Jones was hanged at Lakeport jail. He was wrongfully hanged two days after the sheriff had received a pardon for him.

In 1888, Lakeport was incorporated. For nearly a century, it was the only incorporated city in Lake County.

In 1892, Lakeport got its first telephone.

== Geography ==
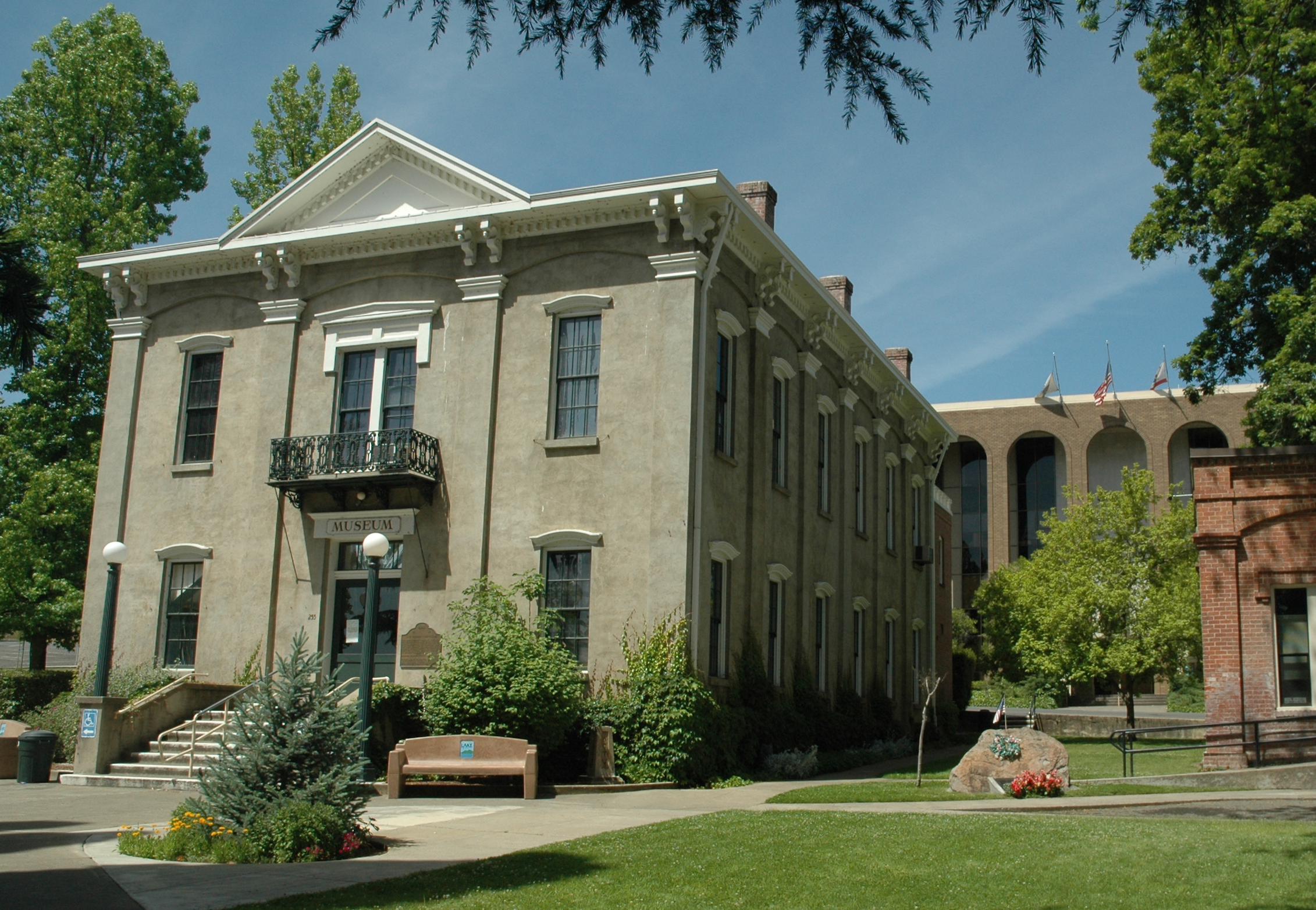
Historic Courthouse

Lakeport is located at 39°02′35″N 122°54′57″W. According to the United States Census Bureau, the city has a total area of 3.2 square miles (8.3 km^{2}), of which 3.1 square miles (8.0 km^{2}) is land and 0.1 square miles (0.26 km^{2}) (4.39%) is water.

The Lakeport area is located on a sediment-filled valley adjacent to Clear Lake. Exposed materials within the area are limited to serpentinite and quaternary sediments. These sediments are poorly consolidated to unconsolidated mixtures of sand, silt, clay, and gravel derived from older rock in the adjacent mountains. Because of the low strength of the quaternary sediments, they are subject to rapid erosion and shallow slumping.

The majority of faults in the county are located in the Cobb Mountain area and Hopland Grade area running southeasterly to the southern County line. The southeastern portion of the county also appears to have considerable earthquake faults. There are also active faults within the vicinity of the City of Lakeport, including the San Andreas Fault which is 30 miles (48 km) to the west, and the Healdsburg Fault which is 15 miles (24 km) to the west. These faults have been responsible for moderate to major earthquakes in the past. The maximum creditable earthquake magnitudes are 8.25 for the San Andreas fault and 6.75 for the Healdsburg fault.

There is a potentially active rupture zone (defined as a fault that has been active during quaternary time – the last 2,000,000 years) existing immediately east of the City limits running parallel and adjacent to the shoreline of Clear Lake. Within the past 200 years, no major potentially damaging earthquakes have occurred along any faults within Lake County, including the Big Valley fault adjacent to the eastern City boundaries. Geologically, recent faulting is indicated, however, by the apparent displacement of quaternary earth materials along the Big Valley fault.

The largest earthquake to affect the city was the 1906 San Francisco earthquake which had a magnitude of 8.3. Although shaking was severe, overall damage in Lakeport was comparatively minor and generally limited to the fall of decorative masonry and chimneys.

The city relies on wells for the majority of its potable water supply. In periods of high rainfall, flooding from Clear Lake, Scotts Creek and Forbes Creek has caused historic property damage.

=== Climate ===
Lakeport, like all of the Clear Lake area, has hot, mostly dry summers and cool, wet winters. The average January temperatures are a maximum of 53.4 °F (11.9 °C) and a minimum of 31.5 °F (−0.3 °C). The average July temperatures are a maximum of 94.4 °F (34.7 °C) and a minimum of 53.0 °F (11.7 °C). There are an average of 77.5 days with highs of 90 °F (32 °C) or higher and an average of 75.5 days with lows of 32 °F (0 °C). The record high temperature was 112 °F (44 °C) on August 10, 1971, and September 13, 1972. The record low temperature was 9 °F (−13 °C) on December 9, 1972. Its climate can be classified as hot-summer Mediterranean climate according to the Köppen climate classification system.

Average annual precipitation is 28.36 inches (72.0 cm). There are an average of 66 days with measurable precipitation. The wettest year was 1973 with 44.50 inches (113.0 cm) and the driest year was 2013. The most precipitation in one month was 19.62 inches (49.8 cm) in February 1986. The most precipitation in 24 hours was 5.43 inches (13.8 cm) on December 10, 1937.

Snow is relatively rare in Lakeport, but common in the surrounding mountains. Average annual snowfall is 1.0 inch (2.5 cm). The most snow in one month was 15.0 inches (38 cm) in January 1937.

Climate data for Lakeport, California (extremes 1920–2002)
Month	Jan	Feb	Mar	Apr	May	Jun	Jul	Aug	Sep	Oct	Nov	Dec	Year
Record high °F (°C)	79 (26)	80 (27)	87 (31)	92 (33)	99 (37)	107 (42)	113 (45)	112 (44)	108 (42)	101 (38)	91 (33)	78 (26)	113 (45)
Mean daily maximum °F (°C)	53.4 (11.9)	58.0 (14.4)	62.2 (16.8)	69.1 (20.6)	77.8 (25.4)	86.0 (30.0)	94.4 (34.7)	93.0 (33.9)	87.4 (30.8)	75.5 (24.2)	61.2 (16.2)	54.1 (12.3)	72.7 (22.6)
Daily mean °F (°C)	42.5 (5.8)	46.2 (7.9)	49.1 (9.5)	53.9 (12.2)	60.5 (15.8)	67.6 (19.8)	73.7 (23.2)	72.5 (22.5)	67.5 (19.7)	58.8 (14.9)	48.9 (9.4)	43.6 (6.4)	57.1 (13.9)
Mean daily minimum °F (°C)	31.5 (−0.3)	34.4 (1.3)	35.9 (2.2)	38.6 (3.7)	43.2 (6.2)	49.2 (9.6)	53.0 (11.7)	52.0 (11.1)	47.7 (8.7)	42.1 (5.6)	36.7 (2.6)	33.1 (0.6)	41.5 (5.3)
Record low °F (°C)	12 (−11)	15 (−9)	21 (−6)	24 (−4)	29 (−2)	30 (−1)	30 (−1)	34 (1)	28 (−2)	12 (−11)	18 (−8)	9 (−13)	9 (−13)
Average precipitation inches (mm)	5.72 (145)	4.94 (125)	3.44 (87)	1.89 (48)	0.75 (19)	0.32 (8.1)	0.04 (1.0)	0.09 (2.3)	0.34 (8.6)	1.70 (43)	3.78 (96)	5.35 (136)	28.36 (719)
Average snowfall inches (cm)	0.7 (1.8)	0.0 (0.0)	0.1 (0.25)	0.0 (0.0)	0.0 (0.0)	0.0 (0.0)	0.0 (0.0)	0.0 (0.0)	0.0 (0.0)	0.0 (0.0)	0.0 (0.0)	0.2 (0.51)	1.0 (2.5)
Source: WRCC

== Demographics ==
Historical population
Census	Pop.	Note	%±
1880	562		—
1890	991		76.3%
1900	726		−26.7%
1910	870		19.8%
1920	1,024		17.7%
1930	1,318		28.7%
1940	1,490		13.1%
1950	1,983		33.1%
1960	2,303		16.1%
1970	3,005		30.5%
1980	3,675		22.3%
1990	4,390		19.5%
2000	4,820		9.8%
2010	4,753		−1.4%
2020	5,026		5.7%
U.S. Decennial Census

=== 2020 census ===
As of the 2020 census, Lakeport had a population of 5,026. The population density was 1,643.6 inhabitants per square mile (634.6/km^{2}). 98.8% of residents lived in urban areas, while 1.2% lived in rural areas. The census reported that 96.9% of the population lived in households, 0.5% lived in non-institutionalized group quarters, and 2.6% were institutionalized.

There were 2,189 households in Lakeport, of which 26.5% had children under the age of 18 living in them. Of all households, 38.5% were married-couple households, 7.1% were cohabiting couple households, 20.9% were households with a male householder and no spouse or partner present, and 33.6% were households with a female householder and no spouse or partner present. About 34.0% of all households were made up of individuals and 19.3% had someone living alone who was 65 years of age or older. The average household size was 2.23, and there were 1,264 families (57.7% of all households).

The age distribution was 19.3% under the age of 18, 5.5% aged 18 to 24, 22.3% aged 25 to 44, 26.3% aged 45 to 64, and 26.7% who were 65 years of age or older. The median age was 47.7 years. For every 100 females there were 89.9 males, and for every 100 females age 18 and over there were 85.3 males age 18 and over.

There were 2,439 housing units at an average density of 797.6 units per square mile (308.0 units/km^{2}). Of these, 89.7% were occupied and 10.3% were vacant. Of occupied units, 60.3% were owner-occupied and 39.7% were occupied by renters. The homeowner vacancy rate was 1.5% and the rental vacancy rate was 5.2%.

Racial composition as of the 2020 census
Race	Number	Percentage
White	3,752	74.7%
Black or African American	59	1.2%
American Indian and Alaska Native	131	2.6%
Asian	130	2.6%
Native Hawaiian and Other Pacific Islander	9	0.2%
Some other race	388	7.7%
Two or more races	557	11.1%
Hispanic or Latino (of any race)	934	18.6%

=== Demographic estimates ===
In 2023, the US Census Bureau estimated that 4.9% of the population were foreign-born. Of all people aged 5 or older, 88.6% spoke only English at home, 9.6% spoke Spanish, 0.8% spoke other Indo-European languages, and 0.9% spoke Asian or Pacific Islander languages. Of those aged 25 or older, 96.0% were high school graduates and 25.8% had a bachelor's degree.

=== Income and poverty ===
The median household income in 2023 was $59,294, and the per capita income was $42,105. About 13.7% of families and 15.7% of the population were below the poverty line.

=== 2010 census ===
At the 2010 census, Lakeport had a population of 4,753. The population density was 1,486.0 inhabitants per square mile (573.7/km^{2}). The racial makeup of Lakeport was 3,932 (82.7%) White, 46 (1.0%) African American, 147 (8.1%) Native American, 99 (2.1%) Asian, 5 (0.1%) Pacific Islander, 337 (7.1%) from other races, and 187 (3.9%) from two or more races. Hispanic or Latino of any race were 799 people (16.8%).

The census reported that 4,616 people (97.1% of the population) lived in households, 11 (0.2%) lived in non-institutionalized group quarters, and 126 (2.7%) were institutionalized.

There were 2,002 households, 563 (28.1%) had children under the age of 18 living in them, 803 (40.1%) were opposite-sex married couples living together, 260 (13.0%) had a female householder with no husband present, 110 (5.5%) had a male householder with no wife present. There were 177 (8.8%) unmarried opposite-sex partnerships, and 16 (0.8%) same-sex married couples or partnerships. 665 households (33.2%) were one person and 328 (16.4%) had someone living alone who was 65 or older. The average household size was 2.31. There were 1,173 families (58.6% of households); the average family size was 2.93.

The age distribution was 1,031 people (21.7%) under the age of 18, 352 people (7.4%) aged 18 to 24, 1,033 people (21.7%) aged 25 to 44, 1,384 people (29.1%) aged 45 to 64, and 953 people (20.1%) who were 65 or older. The median age was 44.2 years. For every 100 females, there were 90.8 males. For every 100 females age 18 and over, there were 86.8 males.

There were 2,395 housing units at an average density of 748.8 per square mile, of the occupied units 1,198 (59.8%) were owner-occupied and 804 (40.2%) were rented. The homeowner vacancy rate was 5.1%; the rental vacancy rate was 8.4%. 2,661 people (56.0% of the population) lived in owner-occupied housing units and 1,955 people (41.1%) lived in rental housing units.

Given the fact that the Lakeport area has an economy that is based somewhat on agricultural activities occurring in the Big Valley and Scotts Valley area which involve the growing and harvesting of food and nut crops as well as the increasing wine industry, there are a significant number of transient and seasonal farm workers. The need for housing, health care services, child care, and other services is clearly evident in this segment of the population. Insufficient data is available to quantify the total number of seasonal or transient farm laborers that are living or working in the Lakeport area.

== Education ==
=== College and Universities ===
Mendocino College operates a center named the Lake Center and is a branch of the Mendocino Lake Community District. The Lake Center offers various courses for the fall, spring, and summer semesters. The Lake Center has student service and assistance on its campus.

=== Primary and Secondary Schools ===
Public schools are run by the Lakeport Unified School District. Lakeport Unified School District governs, Clear Lake High School established in 1901, Lakeport Alternative Education Center, Lakeport Elementary School established in 1868, and Terrace Middle School.

== Arts and culture ==
=== Entertainment ===
The Lakeport Auto Movies Drive-In is one of only fifteen drive-ins remaining in California. The location is behind the Lakeport Cinema 5.

Initially named the Lakeport Theater, the Soper Reese Theatre, purchased in 1997 by Jillian Billester, Jim Soper, and Florence Soper, hosts performing art and community events.

The Lake County Fairgrounds host the annual Lake County Fair every Labor Day Weekend. During the four day period the fair contains local artists performing, carnival rides, and local art exhibits. Outside of the annual Lake County Fair, the fairground host various seasonal events.

Konocti Vista Casino is Lakeport's only casino. Owned by the Big Valley Band of Pomo Indians, the casino's construction started in 1994 and contains entertainment such as slot machines, a hotel, RV park, medical marijuana dispensary, full service gas station, drive thru Starbucks, an arcade and a Little Caesar’s pizza.

=== Museum ===
Founded by Belle Davidson, the Historic Court House Museum is Lakeport's only museum. The museum holds information and exhibits about Lake County and Native American History.

=== Parks ===
Library Park is one of twenty nine administered public parks in Lake County. The park is three acres with outdoor recreation amenities.

Xabatin Community Park, opened on October 26, 2023, contains outdoor recreation amenities such as a basketball court and skatepark. Xabatin Community Park is named after the original name for Clear Lake from the Pomo language.

=== Art ===
The "Mural Trail" are various murals across Lakeport with themes of culture and history of Lake County. Murals include "City Hall" mural by Robert Minuzzo, "Pomo" mural by Michael and Violet Divine, "Pan Ann" mural and "Only the Brave" mural by Ben vanSteenburgh, and "Wildlife" mural by Gloria Delacruz.

Xabatin Community Park contains a Pomo-inspired art installation, titled the Sheecome. The Sheecome was created by artists Wanda Quitiquit and Lisa Kaplan. The Sheecome is designed for seating and is in the art style of Pomo patterns and native species that are central to native life. The Sheecome is made up of a tile mosaic floor.

== Government ==
In the California State Legislature, Lakeport is in the 2nd senatorial district, represented by Democrat Mike McGuire, and in the 4th Assembly district, represented by Democrat Cecilia Aguiar-Curry.

Federally, Lakeport is in California's 4th congressional district, represented by Democrat Mike Thompson.
