= Lake County Superior Court =

California superior court with jurisdiction over Lake County

- Interactive map of Lake County Superior Court
- 39.04359°N 122.91673°W
- Established: 1861
- Jurisdiction: Lake County, California
- Location: Lakeport (county seat); Clearlake
- Coordinates: 39.04359°N 122.91673°W
- Appeals to: California Court of Appeal for the First District
- Website: lake.courts.ca.gov

Presiding Judge
- Currently: Hon. Michael S. Lunas

Court Executive Officer
- Currently: Krista D. LeVier

The Superior Court of California, County of Lake, also known as the Lake County Superior Court or Lake Superior Court, is the California superior court with jurisdiction over Lake County.

== History ==
Lake County was partitioned from Napa and Mendocino counties in 1861.

Lakeport was selected as county seat in the first election in June 1861, and a two-story wooden court house with a footprint of approximately 30 ft × 50 ft (9.1 m × 15.2 m) was erected; a history states it was not "pretentious or showy ... but it answered the purposes for which it was designed very well indeed." The court house was destroyed by a suspected arson on the night of February 15, 1867, and all the county records were lost in the fire, except for one of the Treasurer's books. With the destruction of the court house, the county seat was temporarily moved to Lower Lake; after it returned to Lakeport in 1870, preparations were made for a new permanent court house.

Early county judges included O.A. Munn (1861–63), J.B. Holloway (1864–71), and E.M. Paul (1872–79); after the new California constitution established the Superior Court system, judges included R.J Hudson (1880–89), R.W. Crump (1890–1903; died in office), and M.S. Sayre (1903;1904–14).

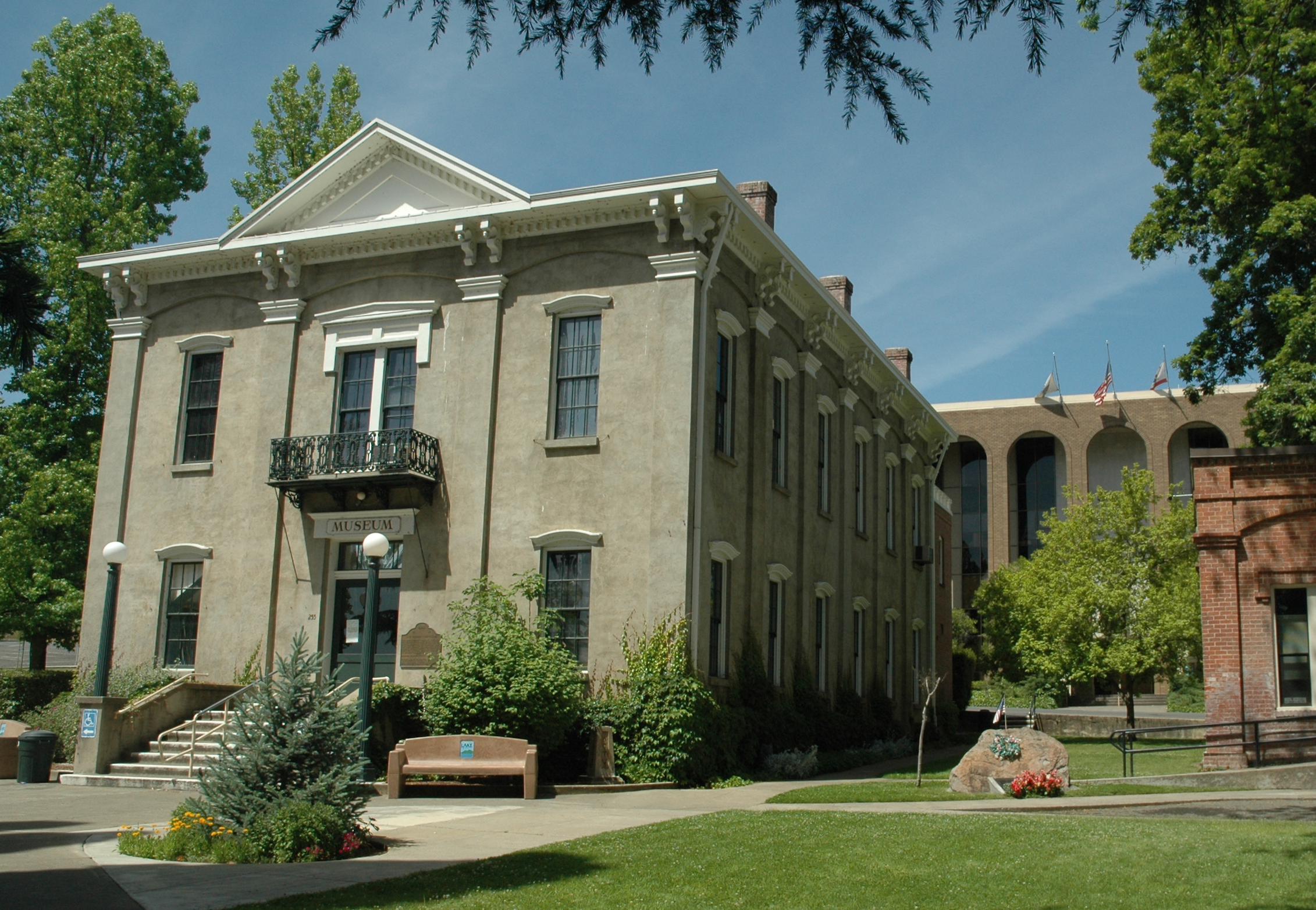
Old (1871) Lakeport Courthouse, photographed in 2007. The brick arches of the 1968 courthouse are visible in the background.

The contract for the new court house was let to A.P. Pettit on May 27, 1870, for $17,000 and it was completed in 1871. The same historian described the 1871 courthouse, a two-storey brick structure with a tin roof and a footprint of 66 ft × 44 ft (20 m × 13 m), as "not at all showy [but] plain and tasty". It received a coat of cement in March 1906, and withstood the 1906 San Francisco earthquake one month later. The 1871 courthouse was added to the list of California Historical Landmarks as No. 897; it also was added to the National Register of Historic Places in 1970.

The current courthouse was completed in 1968 behind the 1871 courthouse and dedicated on September 13; the old courthouse was turned into a museum for county and Native American history. The 1968 courthouse is a three-story structure with brick archways on each face, designed by James Prather and Robert W. Stevens.

Citing "substantial structural problems and significant security issues" as well as overcrowding in the 1968-built courthouse, the Lake County Superior Court is slated to move to a new building. The state approved the acquisition of a six-acre property on Lakeport Boulevard in Lakeport in January 2011 for a 51,000-square-foot building. Preliminary plans for the new courthouse in Lakeport designed by Mark Cavagnero and Associates were approved in June 2012. Construction was originally planned to begin in 2014 and complete in fall 2015, but was delayed following budgetary shortfalls. The 2021-22 state budget included $83.8 million for the Lakeport courthouse project, allowing it to get underway in 2024. Construction is expected to be finalized in September 2026.

== Venues ==
Lake County Superior Court locations:
1 225 N Forbes St (Lakeport)
2 7000A So. Center Dr (Clearlake)

In addition to the main courthouse in Lakeport, a satellite court operates in the county's largest city, Clearlake.
