= National Register of Historic Places listings in Lake County, California =

Location of Lake County in California

This is a list of the National Register of Historic Places listings in Lake County, California.

This is intended to be a complete list of the properties and districts on the National Register of Historic Places in Lake County, California, United States. Latitude and longitude coordinates are provided for many National Register properties and districts; these locations may be seen together in a Google map.

There are 7 properties and districts listed on the National Register in the county, including 1 National Historic Landmark.

This National Park Service list is complete through NPS recent listings posted September 4, 2026.

== Current listings ==
	Name on the Register	Image	Date listed	Location	City or town	Description
1	Anderson Marsh Archeological District		August 24, 1978 (#78000676)	Both banks of Cache Creek between Clear Lake and State Route 53; 38°55′49″N 122°37′45″W	Lower Lake	One of prehistoric California's most densely populated areas, with over 40 identified archaeological sites ranging from 10,000 years ago to the early 20th century.
2	Archeological Site No. Ca-Lak-711		May 25, 1979 (#79000479)	Address Restricted	Anderson Springs	
3	Borax Lake-Hodges Archeological Site	Borax Lake-Hodges Archeological Site	October 3, 1991 (#91001424)	Address Restricted	Clearlake	
4	Cache Creek Archeological District		December 30, 1997 (#95001130)	Address Restricted	Lower Lake	
6	Lakeport Carnegie Library	Lakeport Carnegie Library	April 10, 2008 (#08000261)	200 Park St. 39°02′36″N 122°54′51″W	Lakeport	
5	Old Lake County Courthouse	Old Lake County Courthouse	October 28, 1970 (#70000134)	255 N. Main St. 39°02′34″N 122°54′55″W	Lakeport	
7	Patwin Indian Site		February 23, 1972 (#72000227)	Address Restricted	Clearlake Oaks	

== See also ==
- List of National Historic Landmarks in California
- National Register of Historic Places listings in California
- California Historical Landmarks in Lake County, California
