= California Historical Landmarks in Lake County =

This list includes properties and districts listed on the California Historical Landmark listing in Lake County, California. Click the "Map of all coordinates" link to the right to view a Google map of all properties and districts with latitude and longitude coordinates in the table below.

Image		Landmark name	Location	City or town	Summary
Site of First Adobe Home, Lake County	426	Site of First Adobe Home, Lake County	Main St. & Bell Hill Rd. 38°58′42″N 122°50′36″W	Kelseyville	Site of Stone and Kelsey home and remains
Upload Photo	427	Bloody Island (Bo-no-po-ti)	State Hwy 20 & Reclamation Rd. 39°08′56″N 122°53′17″W	Upper Lake	Replaced in 2005 with an updated plaque
Upload Photo	429	Lower Lake Stone Jail	16118 Main St. 38°54′38″N 122°36′35″W	Lower Lake	
Old Lake County Courthouse	897	Old Lake County Courthouse	255 N Main St. 39°02′36″N 122°55′02″W	Lakeport	Also on the NRHP list as NPS-70000134
Upload Photo	467	St. Helena Toll Road and Bull Trail	State Hwy 29 and Hill Ave. 38°44′54″N 122°36′59″W	Middletown	
Upload Photo	450	Stone House	18174 Hidden Valley Rd; 38°48′33″N 122°34′22″W	Hidden Valley Lake	
Sulphur Bank Mine	428	Sulphur Bank Mine	Sulphur Bank Mine; 39°00′14″N 122°39′59″W	Clearlake Oaks	

== See also ==
- List of California Historical Landmarks
- National Register of Historic Places listings in Lake County, California
