= One-room jail =

Type of American jail

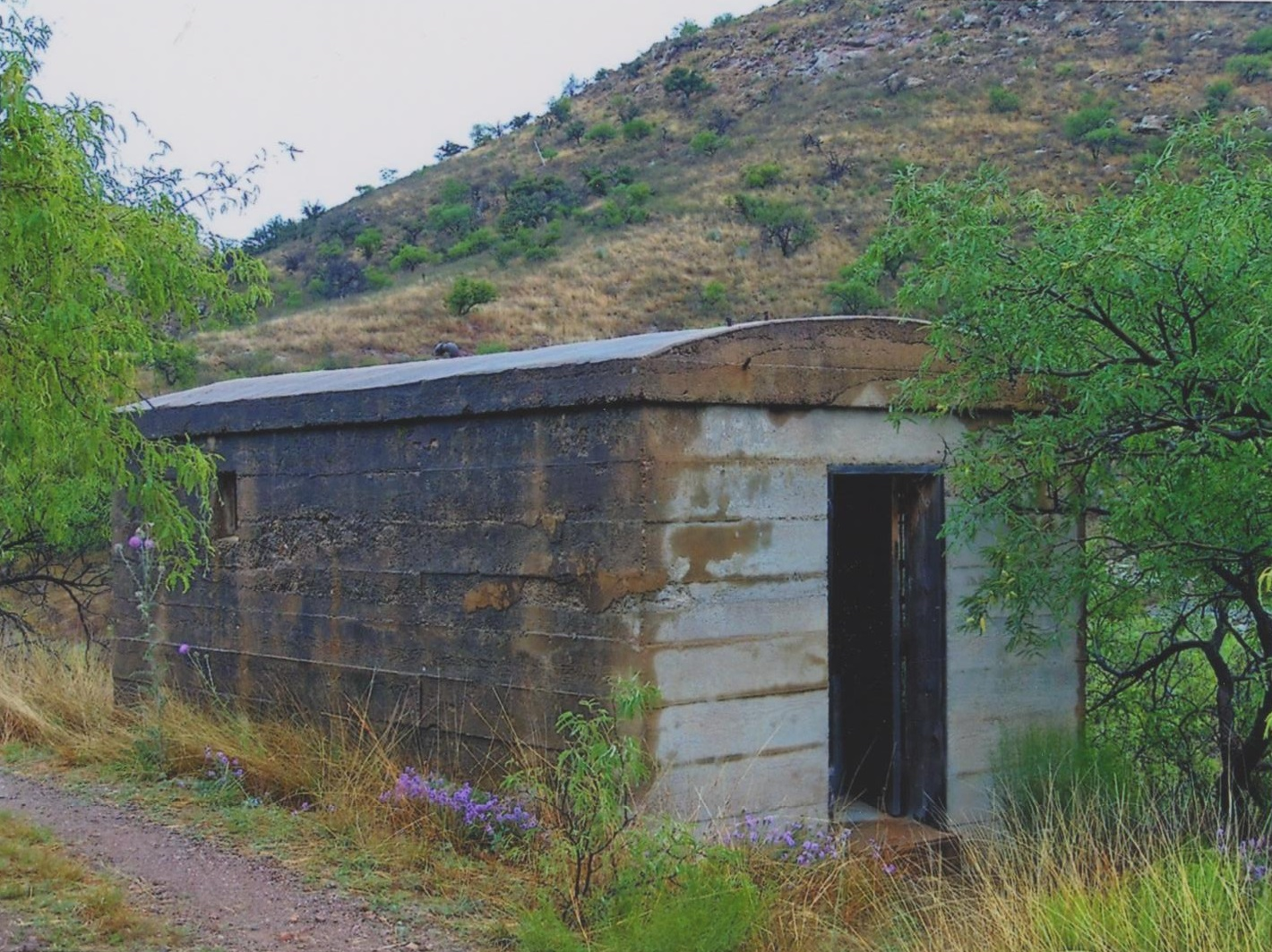
One-room calaboose built in 1936 in the ghost town of Ruby, Arizona.

In the United States, a one-room jail is a type of jail with only one room, or cell.

== One-room jail ==
Examples

- Buhler Jail is a red brick building in Buhler, Kansas.
- Clifton Cliff Jail, a stone building constructed in Clifton, Arizona, is located at the entrance to a small mineshaft, which was used as the cell. It is now preserved and listed on the National Register of Historic Places.
- Lower Lake Stone Jail is a stone building constructed in 1876 in Lower Lake, California, and is one of the smallest historical jail buildings in the United States. It is now a California Historical Landmark.
- San Juan Jail is a wooden-frame structure built in 1870 in San Juan Bautista, California. Now fully restored, it is open to the public.
- Washington County Jail, a one-room log structure in Hillsboro, Oregon, was built in 1853 and in use until 1870. It is now preserved and was added to the National Register of Historic Places in 1986.

== Calaboose ==
In some areas of the United States, a small, free-standing, one- or two-room jail building is known as a calaboose, meaning "dungeon" in Spanish. Calabooses were mainly used to incarcerate prisoners for minor crimes, such as drunkenness in public or fighting, or as a temporary holding cell for when a prisoner awaited transportation to a county jail.

Use of the calaboose was common throughout much of the United States in the 19th and early 20th centuries, and today, surviving examples can be found in several states. Texas, with its large number of counties, has the highest number of historic calaboose jail buildings with over 100 known structures. Many calaboose have only a single cell, feature a curved or vaulted ceiling, and were constructed of solid concrete, although brick, stone, and wooden examples also survive.

Examples

- Arrow Rock Calaboose: A stone structure with vaulted ceiling in Arrow Rock, Missouri, it was built in 1873 to replace the original log jail building that was burned by an arsonist in 1872. Fully restored by the city of Arrow Rock, it is open to the public.
- Bronwood Calaboose: A wooden-frame building with a gabled roof and two cells, it was built around 1900 in Bronwood, Georgia, and in use until 1954. Added to the National Register of Historic Places in 1982.
- Delmar Calaboose: Located in Delmar, Iowa, it was built of limestone block in 1878 and used well into the 20th century. Currently listed on the National Register of Historic Places.
- Elsberry Calaboose: A limestone block structure, it was built around 1896 to replace the original wooden calaboose, which burned. Located in Elsberry, Missouri, the calaboose has been fully restored by the city and is open to the public.
- Holliday Calaboose: A concrete structure in Holliday, Texas, with two cells, it was built in the 1920s and is now privately owned. It is located in an otherwise vacant lot near the Holliday Post Office.
- Ruby Jail: A small concrete structure with a vaulted ceiling in the ghost town of Ruby, Arizona, it was built in 1936 to replace the mesquite jail tree. It has been listed on the National Register of Historic Places since 1975.
- Texola Jail: A concrete and cinder-block structure in Texola, Oklahoma, it was built in 1908 and in use until 1910; it is now open to the public.
- Wingate Calaboose: A red brick building built in 1897, it was in use until 1945. It is located behind the town hall in Wingate, Indiana.

== Strap-iron jail ==
A strap-iron jail is a type of open-air jail made of strap-iron bars. Basically, it is a large metal cage with either one or two cells; strap-iron jails were commonly used in the United States in the mid- to late 19th century. Several surviving examples exist in Texas.

Examples

- Berne Jail: Originally located in the 1895 Berne Fire Station in Berne, Indiana, it is now on display at the Swiss Heritage Village in Berne.
- Clarksdale Jail: Located in Clarksdale, Mississippi
- Foss Jail: An historic town jail, it is located off Route 66 in Foss, Oklahoma.
- Helena Jail is located and on display in the ghost town of Helena, Texas. The Falls City strap-iron jail is also located in Helena.
- Kelso Depot Jail: A strap-iron jail with two cells, it was used to detain drunks in the ghost town of Kelso, California, in the 1940s. It is now on display at the Kelso Depot.
- Mobeetie Strap-Iron Jail: Located and on display in Mobeetie, Texas, it is not be confused with the historic 1886 jail building.
- The Calaboose: Owned by the Punta Gorda Historical Society in Punta Gorda, Florida, it was originally located along Olympia Avenue; the jail has since been restored and is now on display at History Park in Punta Gorda.

== Gallery ==
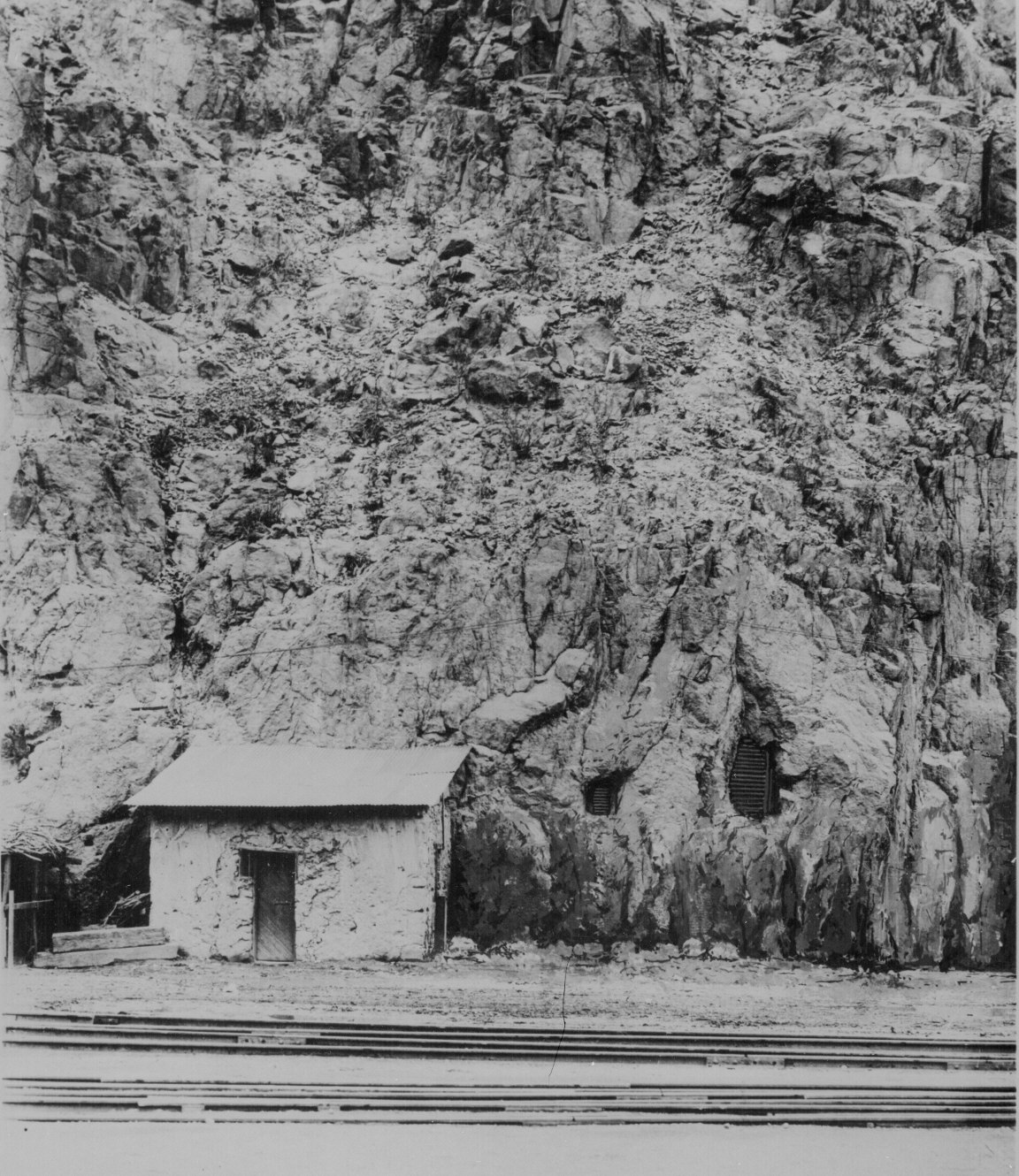
Early photograph of the Clifton Cliff Jail in Arizona: Notice the barred cell windows in the rock face.

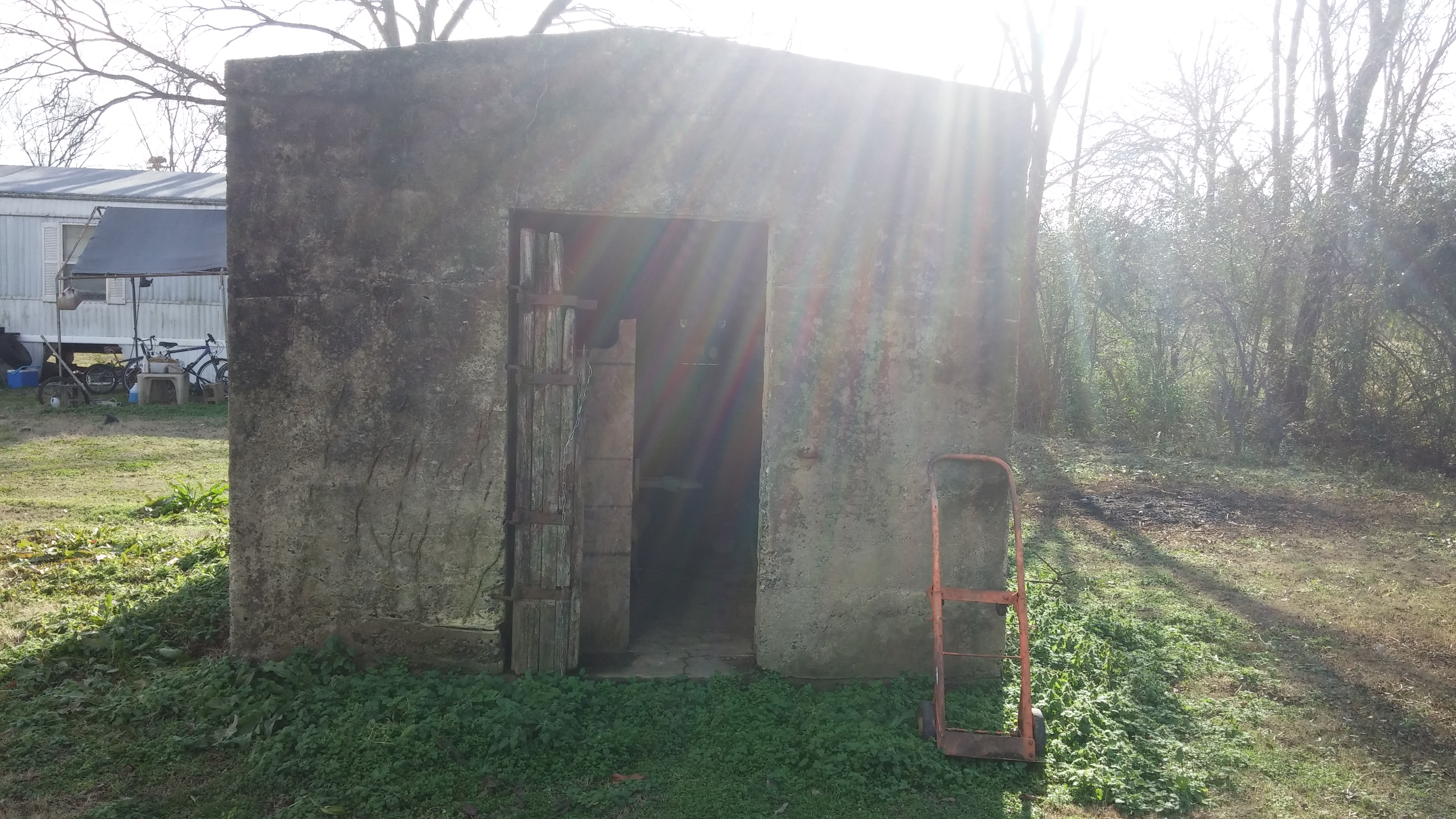
The one-room calaboose in Plumerville, Arkansas, was built around 1880.

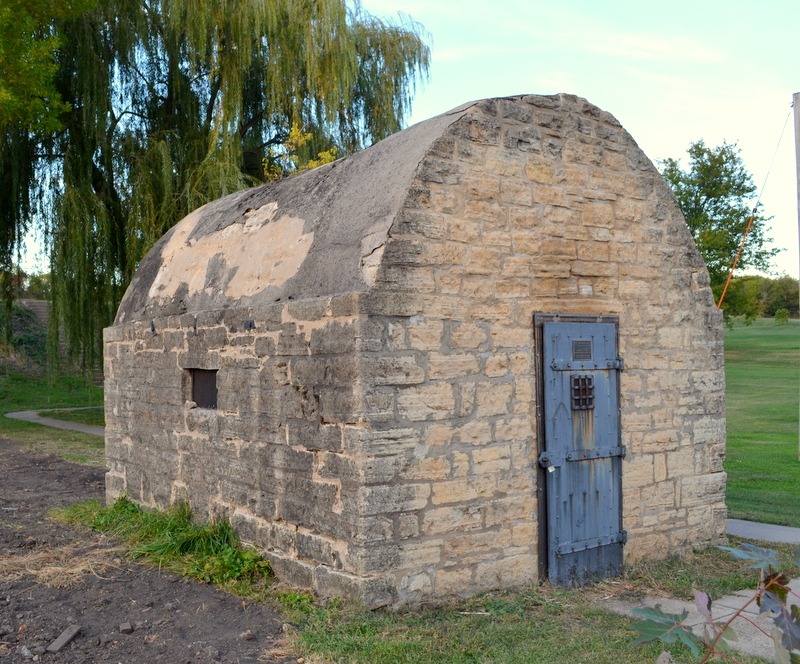
Stone calaboose with vaulted ceiling in Delmar, Iowa.

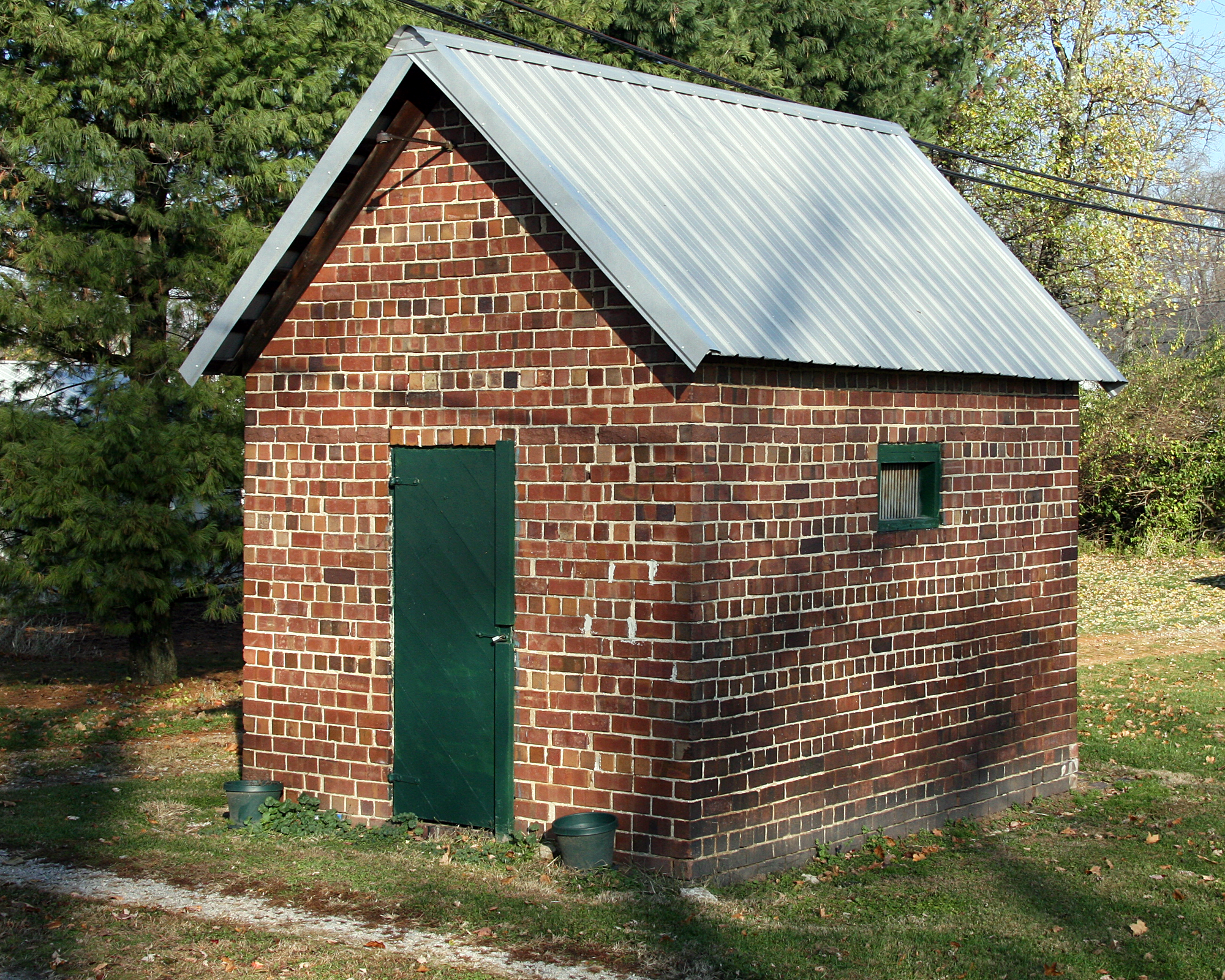
Old jail in Wingate, Indiana, built in 1898

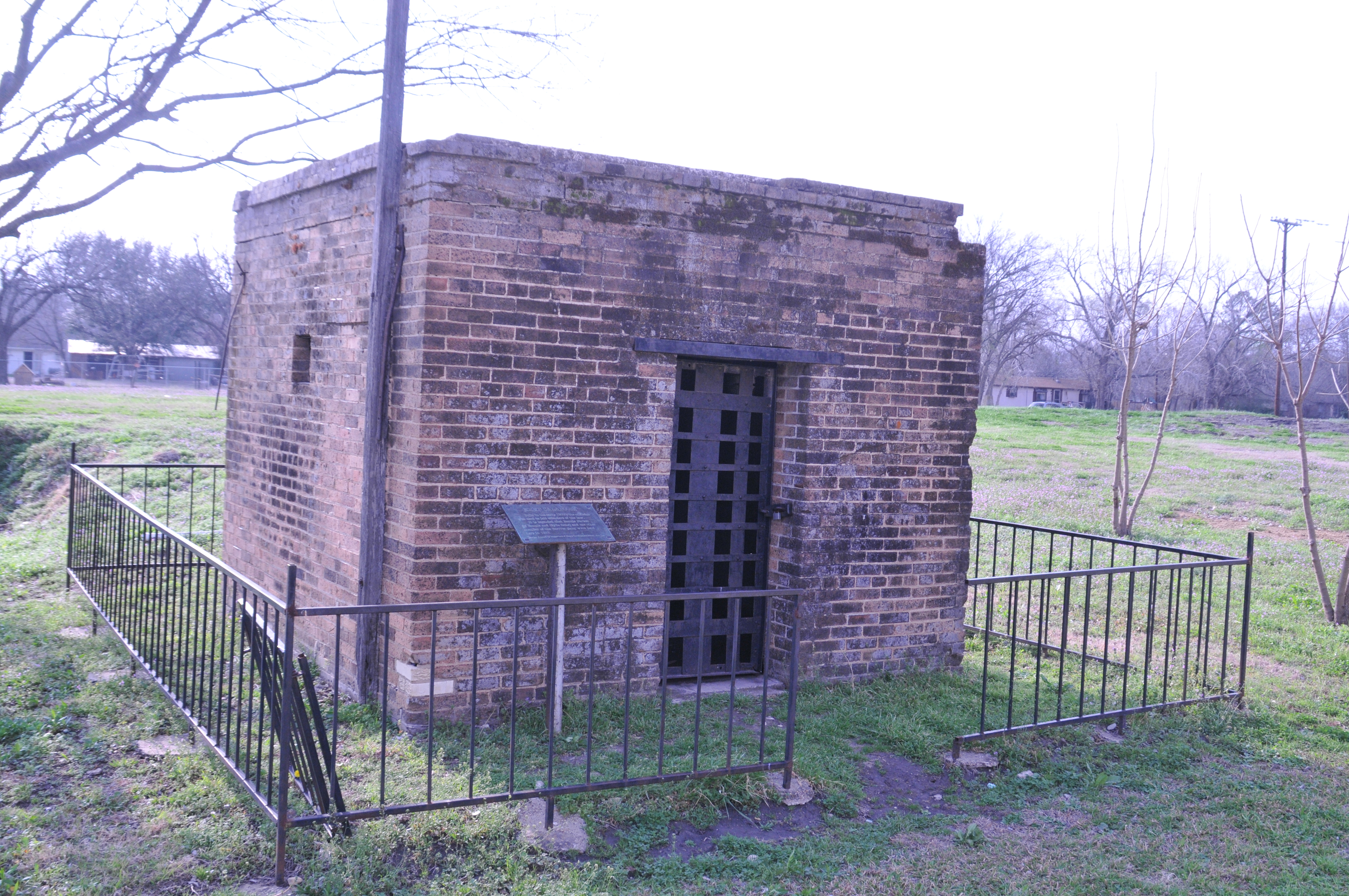
Calaboose Jail in Kemp, Texas

== See also ==
- One-room school
- Jail tree
- List of hanging trees
- Village lock-up
