= St. Helena Toll Road and Bull Trail =

- Location within California
- 38.748267°N 122.616317°W
- Location: Middletown, Lake County, California

History
- Built: c. 1850

California Historical Landmark
- Reference no.: 467

The St. Helena Toll Road and Bull Trail also called the Old Bull Trail Road and St. Helena Toll Road is a historic road and trail in Middletown, California.

== History ==
The Old Bull Trail Road was a road built in the 1850s, it later became the St. Helena Toll Road. The landmark plaque was dedicated May 30, 1950.

== See also ==
- California Historical Landmarks in Lake County
