= Delmar Calaboose =

- U.S. National Register of Historic Places
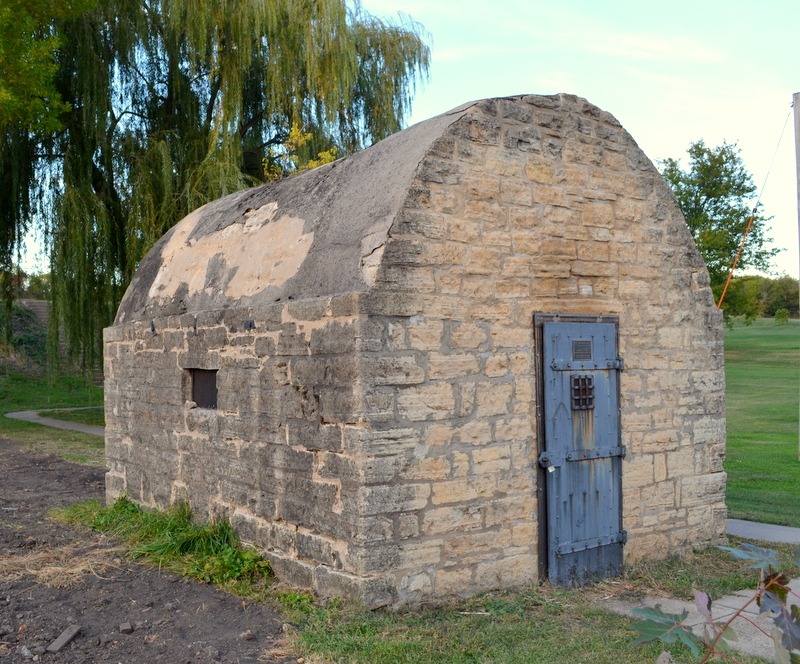

- Location within Iowa Location within the United States
- Location: 520 Vane St. Delmar, Iowa
- Coordinates: 41°59′58.09″N 90°36′21.77″W
- Area: less than one acre
- Built: 1878
- Built by: A.T. Phillips
- Architectural style: Vernacular
- NRHP reference No.: 81000231
- Added to NRHP: March 19, 1981

Delmar Calaboose is a historic one-room jail located in Delmar, Iowa, United States. The word calaboose is a corruption of the Spanish word calabozo, which means dungeon. The building was built for and used as a jail in frontier Iowa. The walls and roof of the one-story structure are composed of limestone and mortar. It was listed on the National Register of Historic Places in 1981.

== History ==
When the Davenport, St. Paul and Midland railroad was being built the town of Delmar had yet to be incorporated, but it had a prosperous liquor trade serving the construction workers. It had become such a problem by the time the town incorporated in 1876 that the town council increased the licensing fees on liquor dealers and saloon keepers to regulate the trade. The plan did not work as those in the liquor trade refused to buy the licenses. Other citizens in Delmar demanded the construction of a town jail. A committee was established in March 1877 to study the possibility, and they recommended that the old school building be used for a jail. It is not known if the plan was ever carried out, but by early 1878 there was a strong desire to build a new jail. Another committee was formed in April of that year to recommend a site and plan a new building. By early summer property on Vane Street was purchased for $50 and the council approved plans for a stone structure. A.T. Phillips, a local builder, submitted the low bid of $175 and construction began immediately. The calaboose was completed in early October 1878 and the town took possession of it. The small jail is the oldest extant public building in Delmar, and the town would use it well into the twentieth century. Similar structures are throughout the United States

== Architecture ==
The calaboose is a 10-by-12-foot (3.0 by 3.7 m) structure. The vaulted concrete roof is 8 feet (2.4 m) high. The walls of locally quarried sandstone are 2 feet (0.61 m) thick. Narrow window slits with grated openings are located on the east and west elevations of the building. The main entrance into the structure is a heavy cast iron door with strap hinges and a grated opening located on the south elevation. The interior is a single room that is sheathed in plaster without ornamentation. The furnishings include a stove, folding cot, bureau, table, and chair that appear to be from the early twentieth century.
