= Historic Washington County Jail (Oregon) =

- Formerly listed on the U.S. National Register of Historic Places
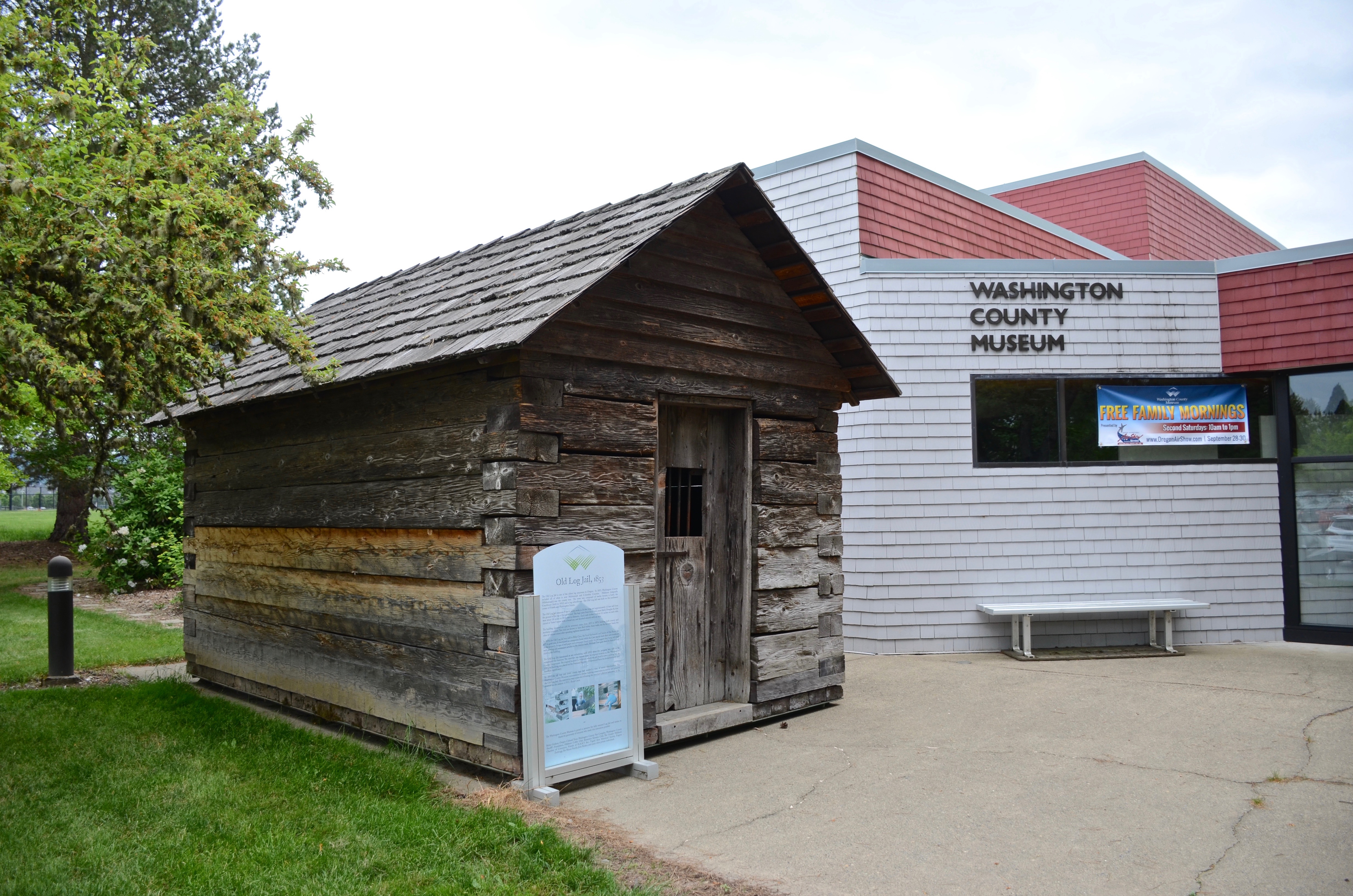
- The jail in 2018

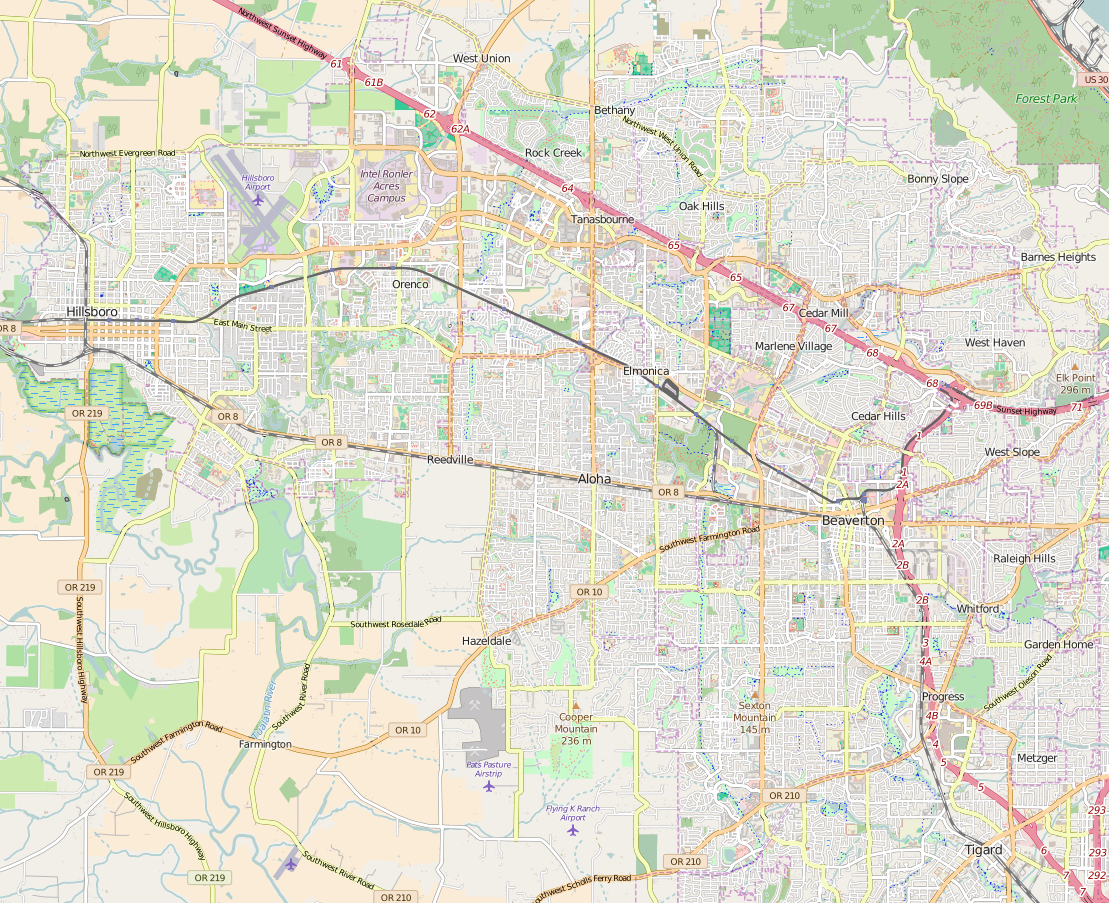
- Location within Hillsboro Beaverton OR
- Location: Washington County, Oregon
- Nearest city: Hillsboro, Oregon
- Coordinates: 45°33′59″N 122°51′27″W
- Built: 1853
- NRHP reference No.: 86002090

Significant dates
- Added to NRHP: July 31, 1986
- Removed from NRHP: December 24, 2008

The Historic Washington County Jail is a log, one-room jail previously used in Oregon. It was built in 1853 and was used until 1870. In 1986, it was listed on the National Register of Historic Places (NRHP), and is preserved by the Washington County Museum in Washington County, Oregon, United States and is exhibited outside of the museum near its entrance. In 2008, the building was de-listed from the NRHP.

== History ==
In 1853, the first Washington County Jail opened. It was built at Fourth and Washington Streets in Hillsboro, Oregon, by William Brown for a cost of $900. During its use, two people died while confined to the jail. A baby (Eber Rice) was born in 1876 after it ceased being used as a jail. He liked to say that he was born in jail and never returned. One of those dying in the jail was former Hudson's Bay Company employee William Burris, who killed his family in 1855 in a drunken rage. However, despite rumors, American Civil War General Ulysses S. Grant was not jailed here while he was posted to Oregon before the Civil War.

In 1870, the building was sold to the Cave family. They lived in it briefly while their house was built, and then used the structure as an outbuilding. In 1953, the structure was moved to the Washington County Fairgrounds (now known as the Westside Commons), where it remained until 2003. Beginning in 2003, the building was restored at a cost of $75,000 and relocated from the county fairgrounds to the Washington County Museum.

=== Currently ===
In 1986, the building was added to the National Register of Historic Places. Then in 2003 the building was disassembled and restored. Next, in 2004, the jail was re-assembled inside the Washington County Museum where it sat as a permanent exhibit, preserved in the climate controlled environment. On December 24, 2008, the jail was removed from NRHP at the request of the museum. In September 2008, the museum decided to move the jail outside, and in March 2009 the old log jail was relocated outside and became an outdoor exhibit on the grounds of the museum.

== Structure ==
The one room, 160-square-foot (15 m^{2}) wooden structure weighs 12,000 pounds. Washington County Jail is sixteen feet long, nine feet wide, and twelve feet tall. The jail was built in three months using Douglas fir timbers. The building originally housed a bucket, ankle chains, and straw mattresses.
