= Borax Lake site =

Archaeological site in California, US

- Borax Lake Site
- U.S. National Register of Historic Places
- U.S. National Historic Landmark
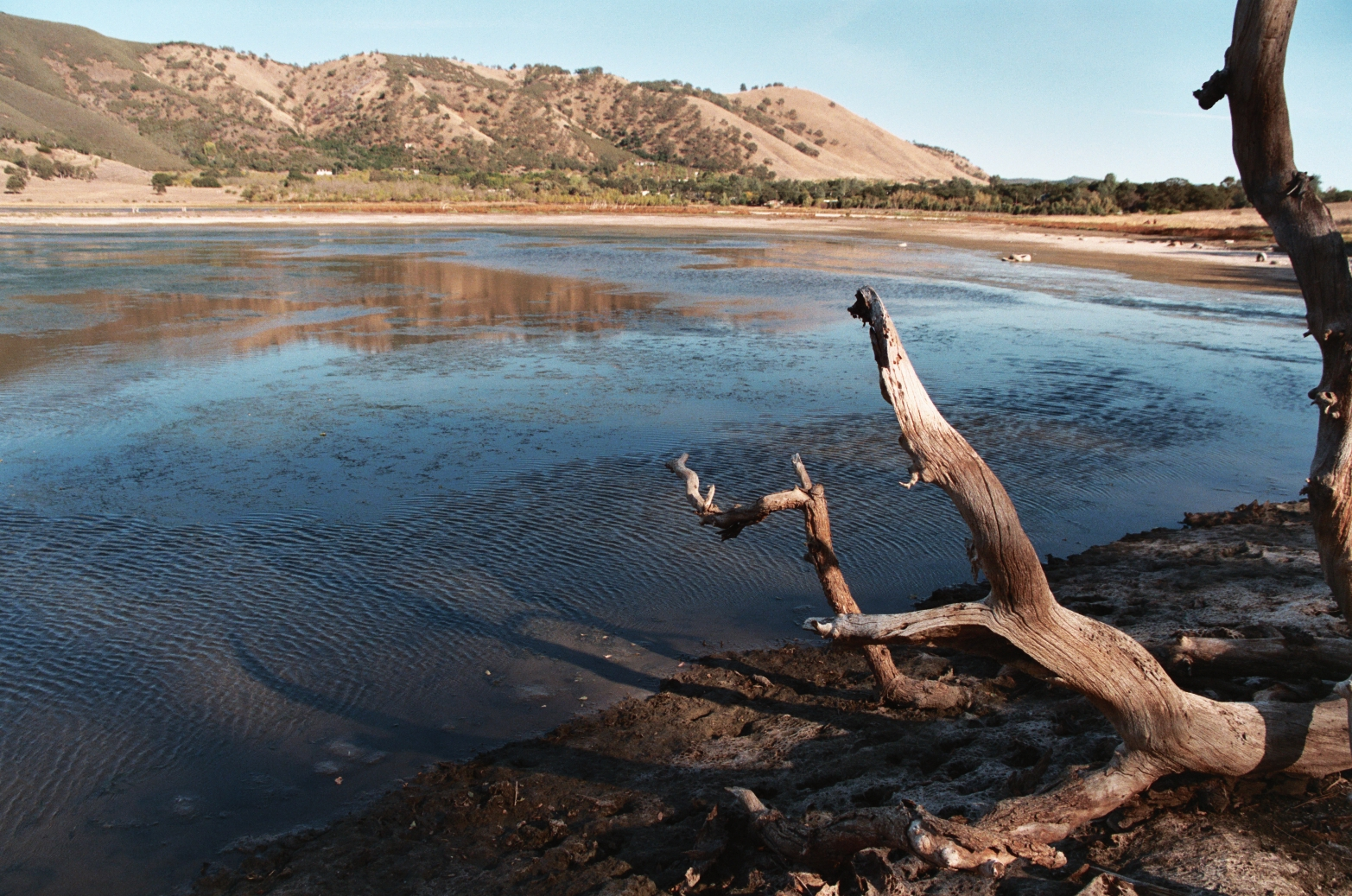
- Borax Lake
- Nearest city: Clearlake, California
- NRHP reference No.: 91001424

Significant dates
- Added to NRHP: October 3, 1991
- Designated NHL: September 20, 2006

The Borax Lake Site, also known as the Borax Lake-Hodges Archaeological Site and designated by the Smithsonian trinomial CA-LAK-36, is a prehistoric archaeological site near Clearlake, California. The site, a deeply stratified former lakeshore, contains evidence of the earliest known period of human habitation in what is now California, dating back 12,000 years. A portion of the site, designated a National Historic Landmark in 2006, is owned and preserved by the Archaeological Conservancy.

== Description ==
The Borax Lake site is located near the community of Clearlake, in the North Coast Ranges of northern California near Mount Konocti. The site is deflated surface site and quarry, with cultural deposits reaching a depth of more than 10 feet (3.0 m). The stratigraphy of the site suggests repeated occupation of the area across a long time period, from about 12,000 to present day. Important finds include Clovis-style projectile points fashioned out of obsidian, which was probably obtained from Borax Lake.

The site was discovered in the 1930s by Chester Post, an amateur collector. He brought the site to the attention of Mark Harrington of the Southwest Museum, who performed the first formal archaeological investigation. Questions were raised then about the early dates he estimated for the site, which were previously unknown in the region. In the 1960s a technical analysis of his finds yielded confirmation of dates to 12,000 years ago. Subsequent investigations have uncovered more details of the site stratigraphy, which is described as that of a lakeshore that is gradually receding. It was one of the first human habitation sites in northern California to be found with this type of setting.

A portion of Borax Lake, including the site, was acquired by the Archaeological Conservancy in 1989; it was that organization's first California site. The site was listed on the National Register of Historic Places in 1991, and was designated a National Historic Landmark in 2006.

== See also ==
- List of National Historic Landmarks in California
- National Register of Historic Places in Lake County, California
