= Five Oaks Museum =

History museum in Washington County, Oregon, United States

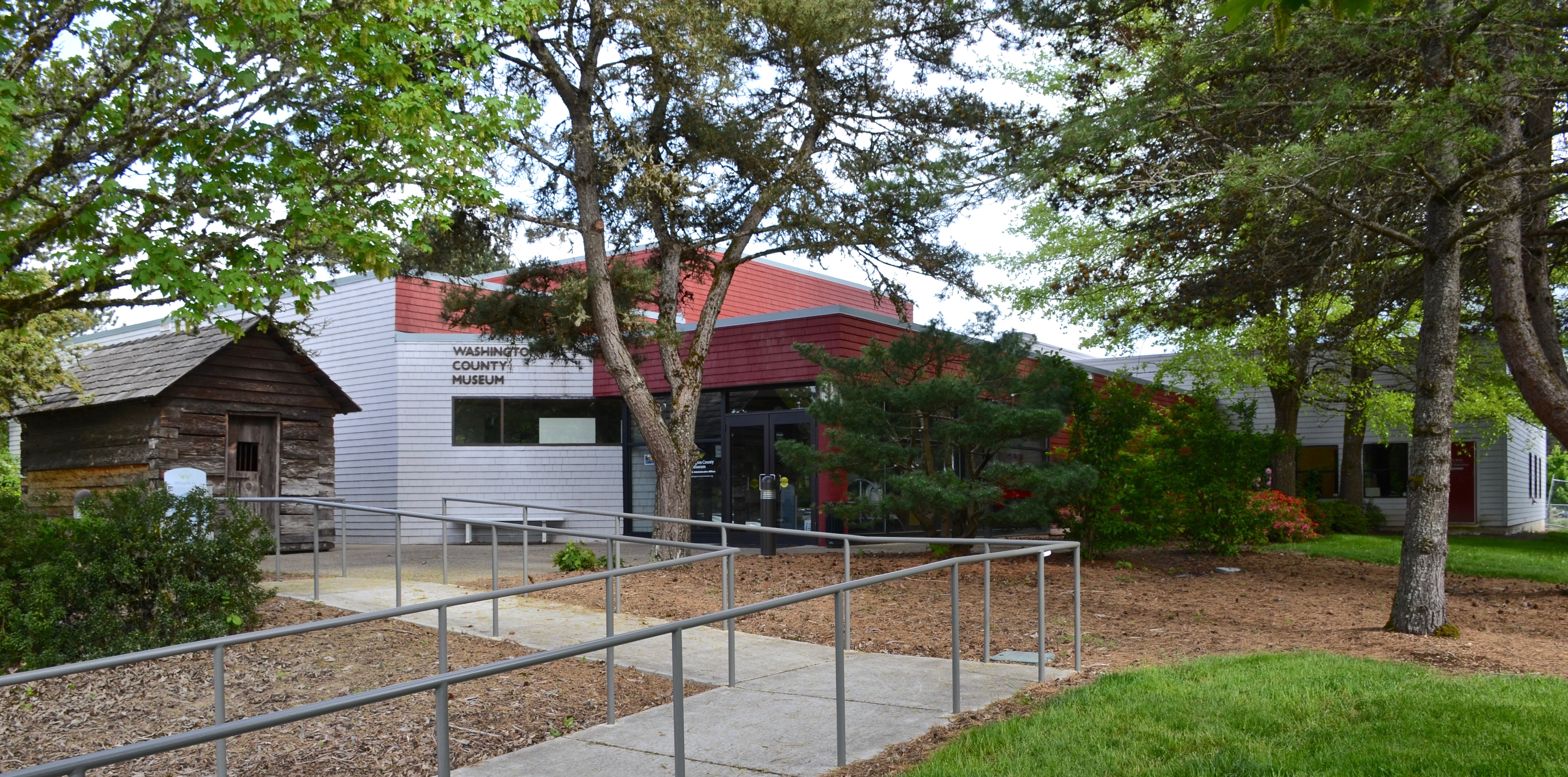
- The former Five Oaks Museum building, as pictured in 2018

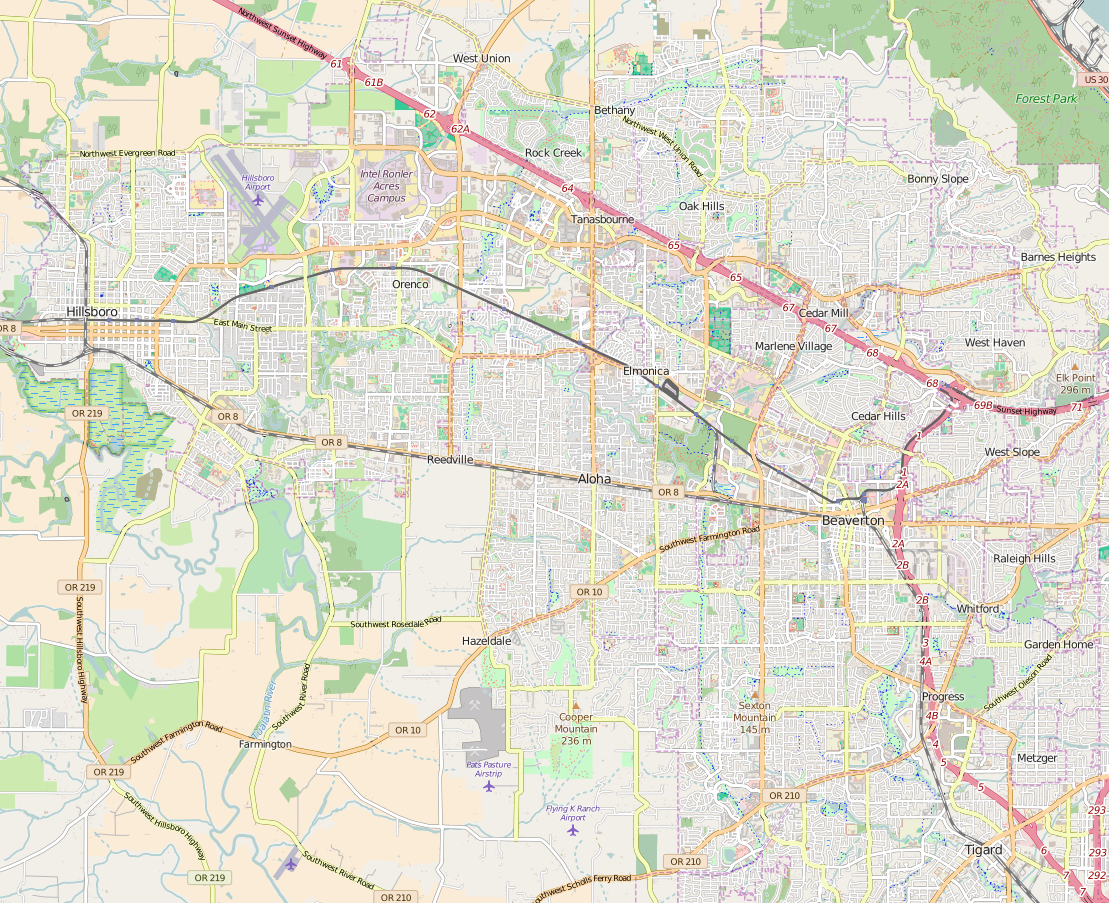
- Location in Washington County, north of Beaverton and northeast of Hillsboro
- Former name: Washington County Museum
- Established: 1975
- Location: 17677 NW Springville Road; Portland, Oregon 97229 (at Rock Creek Campus of Portland Community College); Washington County, Oregon, United States
- Coordinates: 45.566232°N 122.857615°W
- Type: private: history
- Directors: Molly Alloy & Nathanael Andreini (2019)
- President: Dick Schouten
- Owner: Washington County Historical Society
- Public transit access: TriMet bus routes 47, 52, 67
- Website: fiveoaksmuseum.org

Five Oaks Museum (previously known as the Washington County Museum) was a history museum in Washington County, Oregon, United States. It was located at the Rock Creek campus of Portland Community College (PCC), north of Beaverton, Oregon. Opened in 1975, the museum was operated by the Washington County Historical Society with a mission of preserving the history of the area. The museum's site at PCC's Rock Creek Campus also included a research library and was home to the original Washington County Jail built in 1853.

From 2012 to 2017, its public exhibit space was located in downtown Hillsboro, Oregon before it was moved back to PCC, its pre-2012 location and where the museum's research facility had already been located. The museum closed in December 2024 due to a lack of funding.

== History ==
In the 1930s, local historian Albert E. Tozier donated his collection of artifacts, books, maps, and other items to the county historical society. Beginning in 1939, the artifacts were displayed at Hillsboro's Carnegie Library. In 1956, the Washington County Historical Society was incorporated.

In 1962, the society looked at using Shute Park as a possible home for their museum, temporarily moved their collections to the park's pavilion. Then in 1975 the county decided to start a formal history museum. From 1975 to 1987, Washington County owned and operated the museum. During that time the museum was in downtown Hillsboro, Oregon, at the Heidel Home.

In 1982, a new museum was built at the Portland Community College (PCC) campus at Rock Creek, and it opened in January 1983. Later, in September 1987, the Washington County Historical Society took over operations at the museum. In 2008, following the hiring of Sam Shogren, the museum began a $1.7 million expansion of the facility to more than double the size of the museum. The museums annual fundraiser featured Oregon State Beavers basketball coach Craig Robinson as the master of ceremonies in 2009 and raised around $90,000 for the museum.

=== 2012 move to Hillsboro ===
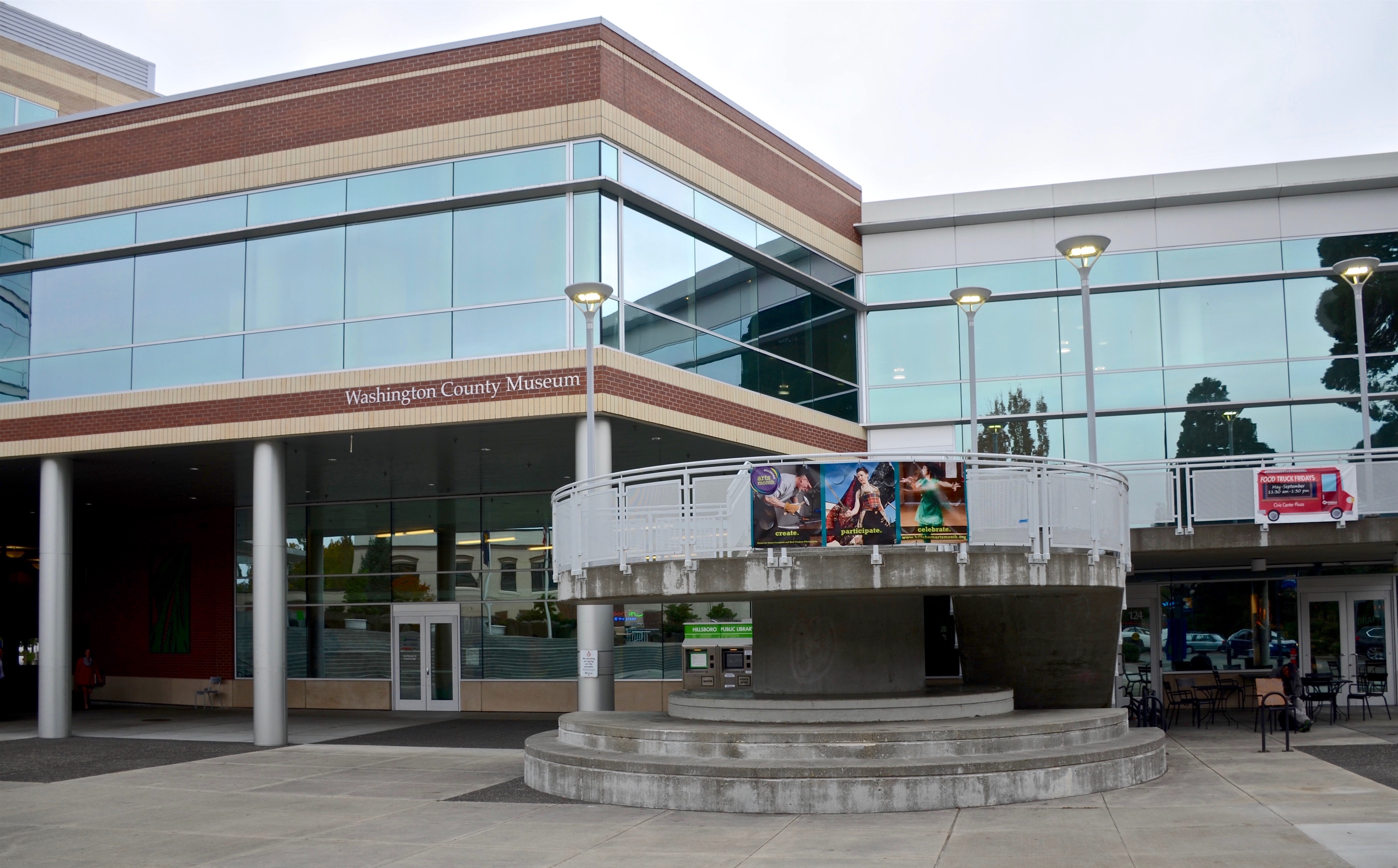
Exterior of the Plaza Building at Hillsboro Civic Center, the museum's main location from 2012 to 2017

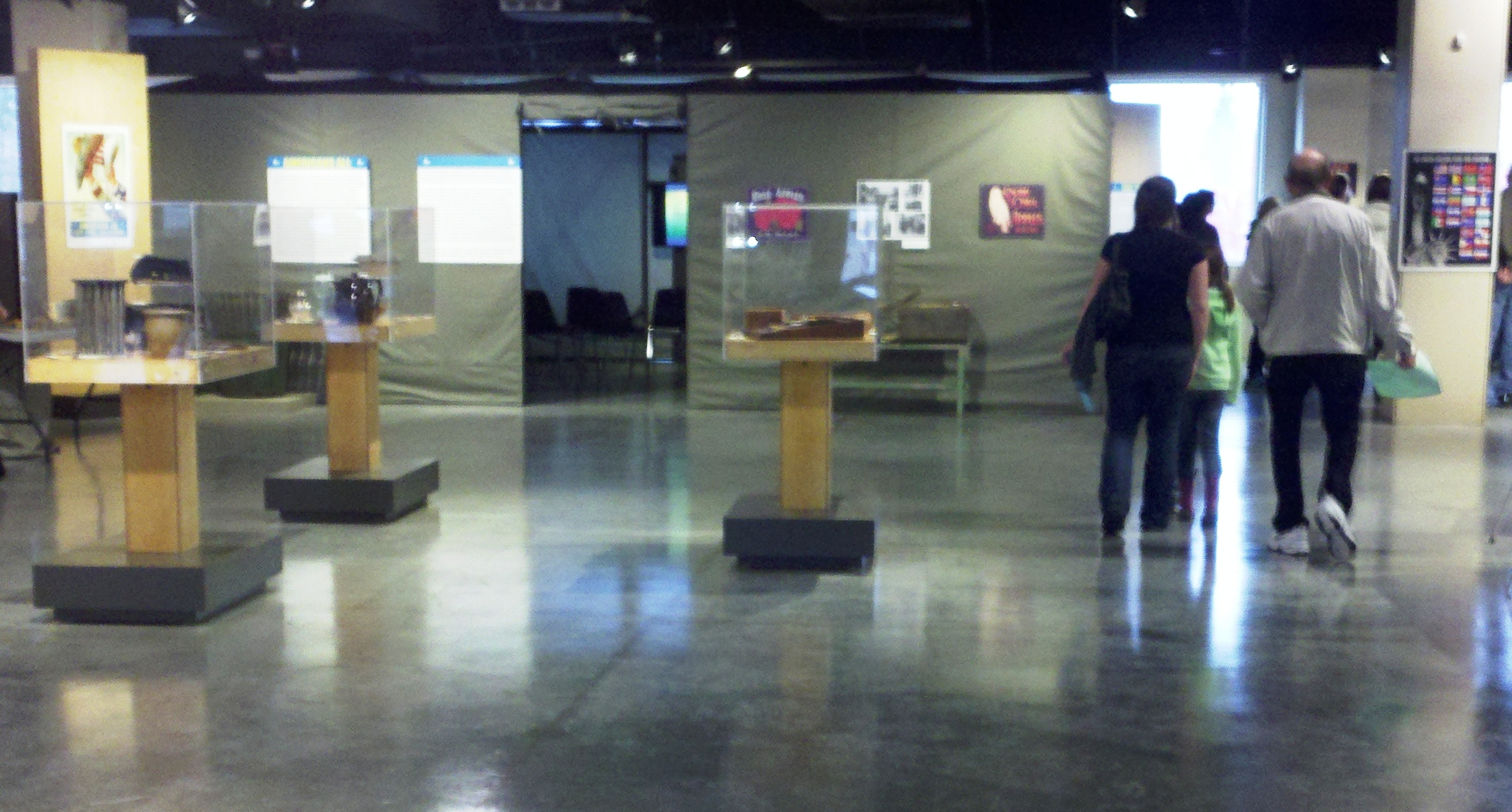
Interior of the exhibit space at Hillsboro Civic Center in 2012

In 2012, the museum moved into a space at the Hillsboro Civic Center, in a return to downtown Hillsboro, with the first exhibits at the new location opening in November 2012. The new space covered 12,400 square feet (1,150 m^{2}) on the second floor in the commercial portion of the center. After signing a fifteen-year lease, the museum was set to complete $1.5 million in improvements to both the new space and the former location at PCC. At the time of the opening of the Civic Center space, museum officials said a lot of work to prepare the new site for the regular exhibits remained to be undertaken, and that it was likely to be 2014 before all of the exhibits were moved from PCC to downtown Hillsboro, with the then-new space in downtown to be used mainly for temporary, special exhibits in the meantime. One of the first of these was a traveling NASA exhibit of the Hubble Space Telescope.

The then-former museum building at PCC underwent renovations in 2014–2015, and continued in use as a repository for the county archives and an historical research facility.

After the departure of the exhibit Hubble Space Telescope: New Views of the Universe in May 2013, a new featured exhibit on the history of the development of the Silicon Forest in Washington County was installed, opening in April 2014. An exhibit exploring the history of the Bracero Program was also a featured exhibit. To coincide with the inaugural season of the Hillsboro Hops minor league baseball team, the museum opened an exhibit in June 2013 spotlighting the history of baseball in the county.

In June 2014 the museum's board and executive director Sam Shogren parted ways according to then board president Betty Atteberry. The director in 2016 was Mark S. Harmon. The museum closed for several weeks in February 2015 to retrofit exhibit walls for seismic upgrades.

=== 2017 move back to PCC ===
In September 2017, the museum's board voted to leave the Hillsboro Civic Center location in downtown and move its exhibits back to PCC Rock Creek. The increase in attendance that the 2012 move to downtown Hillsboro – a higher-profile, more accessible location – had been expected to generate failed to materialize. The museum closed permanently at the Hillsboro Civic Center in September and reopened at PCC Rock Creek on October 25, 2017.

=== 2020 rebranding ===
In January 2020, the Washington County Museum was renamed Five Oaks Museum, in honor of a local historic site.

=== 2024 closure ===
Due to a lack of funding, the museum closed in December 2024. As a result, the ownership of the former museum building has since returned to PCC, and the collection has been returned back to Washington County.

== Details ==
The museum received 5,000 visitors annually at the PCC Rock Creek campus location's 5,000-square-foot (460 m^{2}) facility. When located at the Hillsboro Civic Center, the museum operated a small store, selling books about local history, historical toys, and an assortment of other small gift items. The PCC Rock Creek location was the Robert L. Benson Research Library with over 25,000 images, more than 1,400 maps, and over 500 books along with other historical records and newspapers. The Rock Creek location also serves as the collection storage facility housing over 40,000 artifacts and items of historical significance to the County's history, and was open by appointment only.

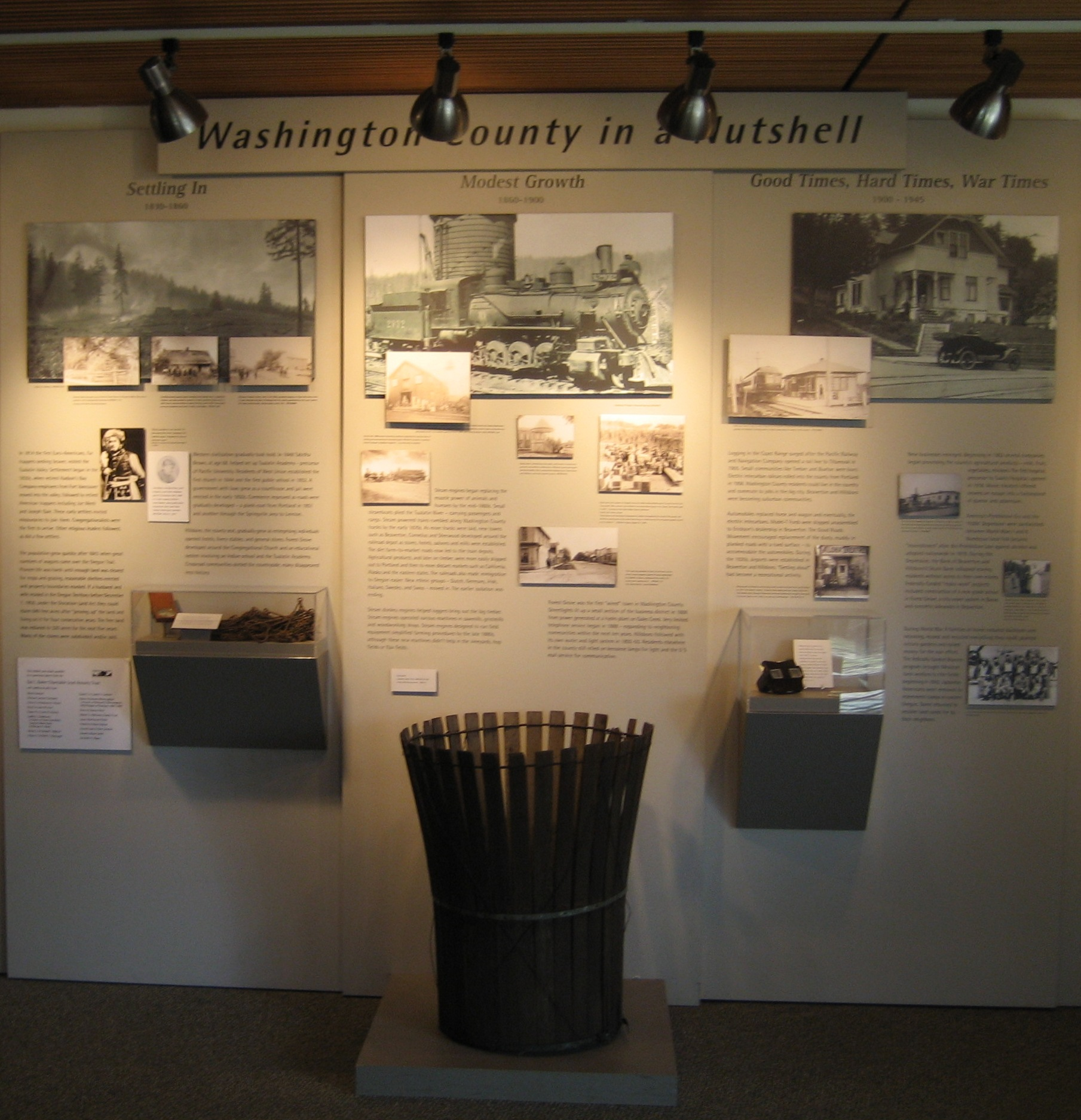
Inside the museum's exhibit space at PCC in 2007

== Collections, exhibits, programs ==
On exhibit at the museum's PCC Rock Creek site was the original Washington County Jail built in 1853. This structure was listed on the National Register of Historic Places from 1986 until 2008. Previously located at the county fairgrounds, the structure was rehabilitated and moved to the museum in 2004. The 10-foot (3.0 m) by 16-foot (4.9 m) jailhouse was originally located inside the museum, but was moved outside when the museum was expanded in 2007.

Other artifacts in the collections ranged from everyday items such as sewing machines, to a wedding dress of a local prominent family. The museum's other exhibits included This IS Kalapuya Land that focuses on the Native Americans of the area, Washington County in a Nutshell that features artifacts from throughout the county's history, and a changing exhibit along with visiting collections. Visiting exhibits have included Oregon is Indian Country from the Oregon Historical Society, among others.

Previously, the museum hosted an annual plowing event named the Draft Horse Plowing Exhibition to demonstrate farming before mechanized agriculture. However, the event moved to Champoeg State Park. Washington County Museum also educated the local community on the history of the county including use of a mobile museum.
