= Lower Lake Stone Jail =

- Location within California
- 38.910556°N 122.609722°W
- Location: Lower Lake, Lake County, California

History
- Built: 1876

California Historical Landmark
- Reference no.: 429

Lower Lake Stone Jail, in Lower Lake, California, is a one-room jail claimed to be the smallest jail in the United States, was erected in 1876 of stone locally quarried and reinforced with iron. During the days of the first quicksilver operations of the Sulphur Bank Mine, lasting from 1873 to 1883, rapid town growth and the urgent need for civil order necessitated the building of a jail. Stephen Nicolai, one of the first stonemasons in Lower Lake, built the jail from local materials with the help of Theodore and John Copsey.

The tiny jail is now defunct, and has been designated California Historical Landmark #429.
