= Old Lake County Courthouse (California) =

- Lake County Courthouse
- U.S. National Register of Historic Places
- California Historical Landmark No. 897
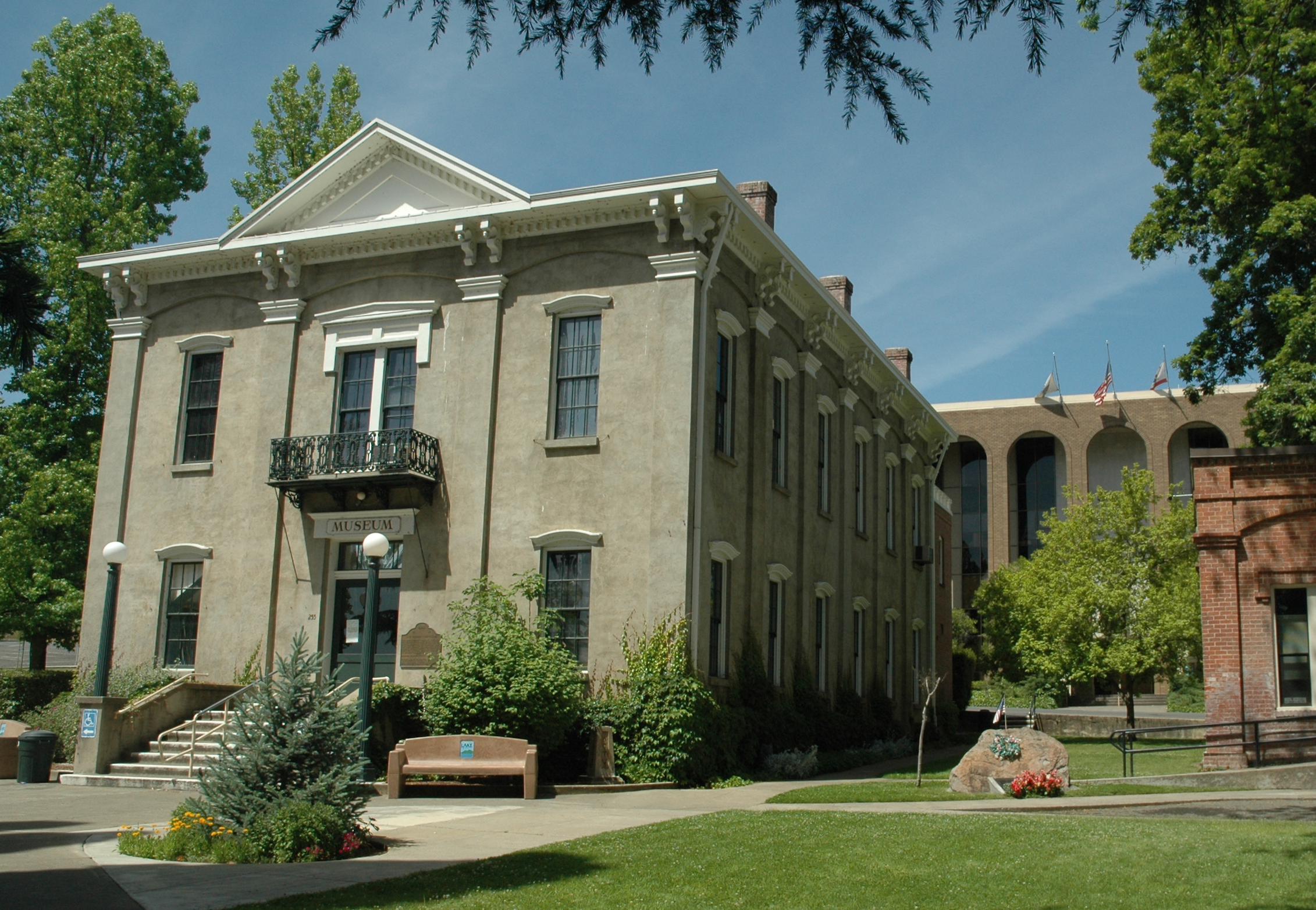

- Location within California Location within the United States
- Interactive map showing the location of Lake County Courthouse
- Location: 255 N Main St, Lakeport, California
- Coordinates: 39°2′36″N 122°55′2″W
- Built: 1870
- Architect: A.P. Pettit
- NRHP reference No.: 70000134
- CHISL No.: 897
- Added to NRHP: October 28, 1970

The Old Lake County Courthouse, also known as Lake County Courthouse, in Lakeport, California is a building built in 1870. It served Lake County as a seat of government from 1871 until 1968. Precedent-setting trials on water rights were held here, along with the "White Cap" murder trial, a notorious episode in vigilantism held here in 1890. The brick courthouse, constructed by A.P. Pettit in 1870–1871, was one of the few buildings in the vicinity to survive the 1906 San Francisco earthquake with only minor damage. It is now California Historical Landmark #897 and is listed on the National Register of Historic Places (NPS-70000134). The county schools library was located in the basement until at least 1968. It is surrounded by a Lakeport City Park.

== Lakeport Historic Courthouse Museum ==
The Lakeport Historic Courthouse Museum is located in the historic Lake County Courthouse. The museum features exhibits of local and natural history, including Pomo Indian baskets and artifacts, local rocks and minerals, early settler history, and early Lake County Courthouse history,
