= Lower Lake, California =

- Census-designated place
- Location within Lake County and the state of California
- Coordinates: 38°54′38″N 122°36′37″W
- Country: United States
- State: California
- County: Lake

Area
  - Total: 2.692 sq mi (6.971 km^{2})
  - Land: 2.667 sq mi (6.907 km^{2})
  - Water: 0.025 sq mi (0.064 km^{2}) 0.92%
- Elevation: 1,371 ft (418 m)

Population (2020)
  - Total: 1,276
  - Density: 478.5/sq mi (184.7/km^{2})
- Time zone: UTC-8 (Pacific (PST))
  - Summer (DST): UTC-7 (PDT)
- ZIP code: 95457
- Area code: 707
- FIPS code: 06-44350
- GNIS feature ID: 0277549

Lower Lake (formerly Grantville) is a census-designated place (CDP) in the southern Clear Lake region of Lake County, in northern California, United States. As of the 2020 census, Lower Lake had a population of 1,276. Lower Lake is also an Indian rancheria of the Koi Nation people.

== Geography ==
Lower Lake is located 4.5 miles (7.2 km) southwest of the City of Clearlake, and 13 miles (21 km) southeast of Kelseyville. It is at an elevation of 1,371 feet (418 m). Lower Lake was at one point the county seat; the Lake County elections of 1867 were hotly contested, with the seat moving between what is now the city of Lakeport and the town of Lower Lake. In 1870, the feud was settled and Lakeport controlled the seat. Although some believe the seat was stolen from Lower Lake, it has remained in Lakeport for over a century and is no longer a topic of concern for locals. At the 2000 census, according to the United States Census Bureau, the CDP had a total area of 7.9 square miles (20 km^{2}), of which 7.9 square miles (20 km^{2}) was land and 0.1 square miles (0.26 km^{2}) (0.88%) was water.

== History ==
Lower Lake was founded by Isaac Edmund Mitchell in 1858 as Grantville. He built the first house there. The settlement's first post office was opened in 1858.

The population was 1,276 at the 2020 census, up from 1,294 at the 2010 census.

The Clayton Fire started on August 12, 2016, in areas of Lake County not burned in the Valley and Rocky Point Jerusalem Fires which ravaged Lake County in the summer of 2015. On Sunday afternoon, August 14, 2016, all residents of the town were evacuated and fire razed large parts of the downtown and other areas of Lower Lake, including Copsey Creek Way. Many residents lost everything they had.

=== Lower Lake Stone Jail ===
The historic Lower Lake Stone Jail was built in 1876 in Lower Lake, from locally quarried stone. It is reputedly the smallest jail in the United States.

== Demographics ==
Historical population
Census	Pop.	Note	%±
1980	1,043		—
1990	1,217		16.7%
2000	1,755		44.2%
2010	1,294		−26.3%
2020	1,276		−1.4%
U.S. Decennial Census; 1860–1870 1880-1890; 1900 1910 1920; 1930 1940 1950; 1960 1970 1980; 1990 2000 2010

=== 2020 census ===
As of the 2020 census, Lower Lake had a population of 1,276 and a population density of 478.4 inhabitants per square mile (184.7/km^{2}). The census reported that 99.1% of the population lived in households, 0.0% lived in non-institutionalized group quarters, and 0.9% were institutionalized. 72.3% of residents lived in urban areas, while 27.7% lived in rural areas.

There were 483 households, out of which 114 (23.6%) had children under the age of 18 living in them, 203 (42.0%) were married-couple households, 50 (10.4%) were cohabiting couple households, 123 (25.5%) had a female householder with no spouse or partner present, and 107 (22.2%) had a male householder with no spouse or partner present. 107 households (22.2%) were one person, and 50 (10.4%) were one person aged 65 or older. The average household size was 2.62. There were 310 families (64.2% of all households).

The age distribution was 297 people (23.3%) under the age of 18, 64 people (5.0%) aged 18 to 24, 334 people (26.2%) aged 25 to 44, 329 people (25.8%) aged 45 to 64, and 252 people (19.7%) who were 65 years of age or older. The median age was 41.9 years. For every 100 females, there were 95.4 males, and for every 100 females age 18 and over there were 92.3 males age 18 and over.

There were 576 housing units at an average density of 216.0 units per square mile (83.4 units/km^{2}), of which 483 (83.9%) were occupied. Of these, 376 (77.8%) were owner-occupied, and 107 (22.2%) were occupied by renters. 16.1% of housing units were vacant. The homeowner vacancy rate was 1.0% and the rental vacancy rate was 7.0%.

Racial composition as of the 2020 census
Race	Number	Percent
White	839	65.8%
Black or African American	32	2.5%
American Indian and Alaska Native	36	2.8%
Asian	13	1.0%
Native Hawaiian and Other Pacific Islander	5	0.4%
Some other race	206	16.1%
Two or more races	145	11.4%
Hispanic or Latino (of any race)	333	26.1%

=== 2010 census ===
At the 2010 census Lower Lake had a population of 1,294. The population density was 480.8 inhabitants per square mile (185.6/km^{2}). The racial makeup of Lower Lake was 1,031 (79.7%) White, 20 (1.5%) African American, 18 (1.4%) Native American, 13 (1.0%) Asian, 1 (0.1%) Pacific Islander, 125 (9.7%) from other races, and 86 (6.6%) from two or more races. Hispanic or Latino of any race were 219 people (16.9%).

The census reported that 1,291 people (99.8% of the population) lived in households, 3 (0.2%) lived in non-institutionalized group quarters, and no one was institutionalized.

There were 552 households, 146 (26.4%) had children under the age of 18 living in them, 216 (39.1%) were opposite-sex married couples living together, 74 (13.4%) had a female householder with no husband present, 32 (5.8%) had a male householder with no wife present. There were 40 (7.2%) unmarried opposite-sex partnerships, and 2 (0.4%) same-sex married couples or partnerships. 190 households (34.4%) were one person and 73 (13.2%) had someone living alone who was 65 or older. The average household size was 2.34. There were 322 families (58.3% of households); the average family size was 2.99.

The age distribution was 259 people (20.0%) under the age of 18, 96 people (7.4%) aged 18 to 24, 254 people (19.6%) aged 25 to 44, 449 people (34.7%) aged 45 to 64, and 236 people (18.2%) who were 65 or older. The median age was 46.5 years. For every 100 females, there were 99.7 males. For every 100 females age 18 and over, there were 100.2 males.

There were 705 housing units at an average density of 261.9 per square mile, of the occupied units 389 (70.5%) were owner-occupied and 163 (29.5%) were rented. The homeowner vacancy rate was 6.2%; the rental vacancy rate was 13.7%. 938 people (72.5% of the population) lived in owner-occupied housing units and 353 people (27.3%) lived in rental housing units.

=== 2000 census ===
At the 2000 census there were 1,755 people, 716 households, and 458 families in the CDP. The median household income was $24,974 and the median family income was $29,896. Males had a median income of $38,750 versus $21,250 for females. The per capita income for the CDP was $13,516. About 9.9% of families and 12.4% of the population were below the poverty line, including 12.0% of those under age 18 and 5.4% of those age 65 or over.

== Government ==
In the California State Legislature, Lower Lake is in the 2nd senatorial district, represented by Democrat Mike McGuire, and in the 4th Assembly district, represented by Democrat Cecilia Aguiar-Curry.

In the United States House of Representatives, Lower Lake is in California's 4th congressional district, represented by Democrat Mike Thompson.
