= Great Western =

Great Western can refer to:

== Locations ==
- Great Western, Victoria, a town in Victoria, Australia
- Great Western Divide, a long ridge in California's Sierra Nevada Mountains, USA
- Great Western Mountain, a mountain in central Sri Lanka
- Great Western Tiers, a collection of small mountain bluffs in Tasmania, Australia
- Great Western Woodlands, biodiverse area in South West Australia

== Railways ==
- Great Western Railway, a UK railway company nationalised in 1948 and that has since lent its name to:
  - Great Western Main Line, a principal passenger and freight rail route
  - Great Western Railway (train operating company), traded as Great Western Trains until 1998, then First Great Western until 2015
  - Great Western Holdings, a company formed in 1994 to bid (successfully) for the Great Western franchise
  - Great Western was the name of several locomotives that were built for and run on the Great Western Railway, from different classes:
    - Iron Duke class
    - Rover class
    - 3031 Achilles or Dean Single class
    - 4073 Castle class
- Great Western Railway (Ontario), originally of Canada West
- Great Western Railway (Saskatchewan), a short line railway in Canada
- Chicago Great Western Railway, US
- Great Western Railroad (Illinois) (1853-1865), predecessor of the Wabash Railroad, US
- Great Western Railroad (Ohio), US
- Great Western Railway of Colorado, US
- Great Western railway station, near the Great Western Mountain, Sri Lanka

== Businesses and organisations ==
- Great Western Air Ambulance Charity, helicopter ambulance trust in South West England
- Great Western Ambulance Service, a former NHS emergency services trust in South West England
- Great Western Arms Company, former firearms manufacturer in California, US
- Great Western Bank (disambiguation)
- Great Western Brewing Company, located in Saskatoon, Saskatchewan, Canada
- Great Western Business and Normal College, former college in Kansas, US
- Great Western Cities, partnership between Bristol, Cardiff and Newport, UK
- Great Western Combination, former football league in South Central England
- The Great Western Cotton Factory, former cotton mill in Bristol, UK
- Great Western Garment Co., former clothing company in Alberta, Canada
- Great Western Hospital, in Swindon, England
  - Great Western Hospitals NHS Foundation Trust runs the Great Western Hospital, Swindon
- Great Western Hotel (disambiguation), several hotels
- Great Western Lacrosse League, former sports conference in US
- Great Western Steam Laundry, former laundry in Glasgow, UK
- Great Western Mine, a coal mine in South Wales, UK
- Great Western Mine (Lake County, California), a mercury mine in California, USA
- Great Western Schoolhouse, historic place and museum in Ohio, US
- Great Western Sugar Company, a sugar company headquartered in Denver, Colorado

== Ships ==
- SS Great Western, the first purpose-built trans-Atlantic steamship, 1838
- PS Great Western (1864), owned for a time by the Great Western Railway, later named PS Lovedale
- TSS Great Western (1901), built for GWR, renamed 'GWR No. 20' in 1933
- TSS Great Western (1933), built for the GWR to replace a previous ship of the same name
- USS Great Western, ammunition ship of Union Navy during US Civil War

== Other ==
- Sarah A. Bowman (c. 1813-1866), American innkeeper, restaurateur, and madam
- The Great Western, an album by James Dean Bradfield
- Great Western Building, colonial-era residence, court and hotel in Mumbai, India
- Great Western Cattle Trail, cattle driving trail, US
- The Great Western Chorus of Bristol, a men's a cappella chorus singing primarily in the Barbershop style
- Great Western Loop, long-distance hiking trail in the western US
- Great Western Trail, multiple-use route between Canada and Mexico
- Great Western Trail (board game), based on the Great Western Cattle Trail
- Great Western Turnpike, former series of toll routes in New York state, US
- Great Western Valkyrie, an album by Rival Sons

== See also ==
- Great Western Road (disambiguation)
- Great West (disambiguation)
