= Western bank =

Western bank may refer to:

- Canadian Western Bank (CWB), a bank in Edmonton, Alberta, Canada
- Bankwest, a bank in Perth, Australia
- Westernbank, a bank in Mayagüez, Puerto Rico

== See also ==
- Great Western Bank (disambiguation)
- West Bank (disambiguation)
