= West Bank (disambiguation) =

The West Bank is a landlocked territory east of Israel and west of Jordan, forming the bulk of the State of Palestine.

West Bank or Westbank may also refer to:

== Administrative areas ==
- Judea and Samaria Area, the Israeli administrative district covering most of Area C of the West Bank
- Luxor § West bank, the site of many ancient Egyptian monuments, temples and tombs

== Iraq ==
- West Bank of Mosul

== Canada ==
- West Kelowna, a city in British Columbia, colloquially known as Westbank
  - Westbank, British Columbia, a municipality in British Columbia, Canada
  - Westbank First Nation, a First Nations government in Canada

== United States ==
- Westbank, an area of the New Orleans metropolitan area; refers to the west side of the Mississippi River
  - Westbank Expressway, a portion of U.S. Route 90 Business in this area
- West Bank, an area of the University of Minnesota
  - West Bank station, a light rail station serving the West Bank campus
- Cedar-Riverside, referred to as West Bank, an area of Minneapolis
- West Bank Light, Staten Island, New York

== Europe ==
- West Bank (Rhine), the western side of the river Rhine, a region claimed either by France or Germany in the modern era
- West Bank, an area of Widnes, Cheshire, England
- West Bank House, a boarding house in Uppingham School in Rutland, England

== Other uses ==
- West Bank, a clone of the arcade game Bank Panic

== See also ==
- Bank West (disambiguation)
- Bank of the West, a defunct American financial institution (1874–2023)
- Vereins- und Westbank, a Bavarian bank
- Westbank hospital, India
- Westbank Orphanage, a former orphanage in Ireland
- Western bank (disambiguation)
