= McLaughlin Natural Reserve =

University of California Natural Reserve System reserve

- Location within California Location within the United States
- Location: 26775 Morgan Valley Rd
- Nearest city: Lower Lake, California
- Coordinates: 38°52′26″N 122°25′54″W
- Area: 7,050 acres (28.5 km^{2})
- Established: 1993
- Governing body: University of California, Davis

The Donald and Sylvia McLaughlin Natural Reserve is a 7,050-acre (28.5 km^{2}) University of California Natural Reserve System reserve in the Blue Ridge Berryessa Natural Area, in Napa and Lake counties of California. The site is owned by the Homestake Mining Company, and is the site of the now-closed McLaughlin Mine.

The nature reserve protects California interior chaparral and woodlands habitat, in the Northern Inner California Coast Ranges.

== History ==
A signed agreement between Homestake Mining Company and the University of California established the reserve as a research and teaching facility in January 1993. The Ray Krauss Field Station was established on the reserve in 1998 and hosts university courses and research such as geology, plant evolution and genetics, among others. Although the reserve is not open to the general public, there are workshops, lectures, and guided field hikes available.

In 1999, Homestake Mining Company was given the Corporate Habitat of the Year award by the nonprofit Wildlife Habitat Council for the company's reclamation efforts and projects. The Homestake McLaughlin Mine Habitat Program includes sensitive species protection, restoring disturbed areas and monitoring of wildlife and habitats.

The reserve is named for and located at the site of the McLaughlin gold mine, Between 1985 and 2002 the mine produced about 3.4 million ounces of gold, with a current value of about US$4 billion (at $1200 per oz). "It's serving as a model for how used-up mines can have a second life," states Sylvia McLaughlin, the reserve's namesake, an environmental activist who also cofounded Save The Bay, to protect the San Francisco Bay from infill and pollution. Homestake Mining Company bought the land in 1981 from William Wilder, owner of the One Shot Mining Company which included the abandoned Manhattan Mercury Mine. The historic Manhattan mining pit became McLaughlin's. In 1992, Homestake purchased the nearby Gamble Ranch, and with a boundary adjustment, historic Knoxville as well. At the McLaughlin Natural Reserve, the town of Knoxville is a few stone walls, all that is left from a mining community of 300 people and fifty buildings during its heyday of the 1880s.

In 2006 the National Science Foundation gave the University of California Natural Reserve System more than $65,000 for construction of a greenhouse at the Mclaughlin reserve which is within the UC reserve system. Greenhouse facilities are used in studies such as plant ecological genetics.

== See also ==
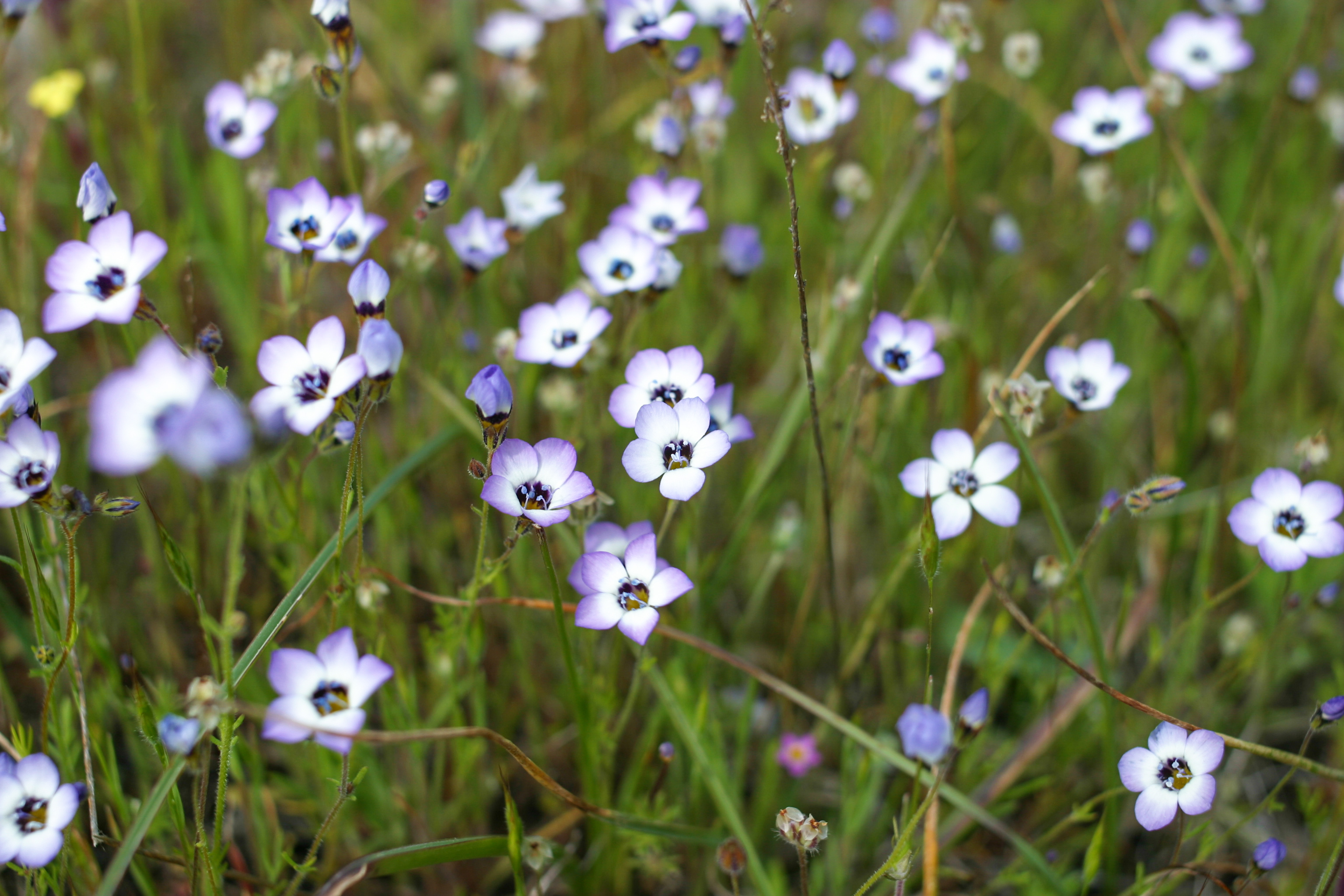
Gilia tricolor in McLaughlin Natural Reserve

- Chaparral
