= Bank West =

Bank West may refer to:

- Bank of the West, bank in California
- Bankwest, bank in Australia
- Zag Bank, bank in Canada that previously traded as Bank West

== See also ==
- West Bank (disambiguation)
