= Great West Road =

Great West Road may refer to:

- A4 road (England) from London to Bath and Bristol
  - Golden Mile (Brentford), West London (part of the above)
- Great West Road, Zambia

== See also ==
- Great Western Road (disambiguation)
