= Great West =

Great West may mean:

- Alternate name of Far West, an East Asian term that refers to Europe
- The Great West Conference, was an NCAA college athletic conference in the continental USA
- The Great-West Life Assurance Company, a life insurance company. Its headquarters are in Winnipeg, Manitoba
- The Great West Aerodrome, existed from 1929 to 1944, about half a mile square, where part of London Heathrow Airport is now.

== See also ==
- Great Western (disambiguation)
