= Great Western Steam Laundry =

Laundry in Glasgow, Scotland

The Great Western Steam Laundry was a laundry in South Jordanhill in the western suburbs of Glasgow, Scotland.

It was built between 1883 and 1885 and was designed by John Russell Mackenzie. It served the miners in the area.

The laundry ceased operations in the early 1960s and was destroyed by arson some years later. As the site had long been used for non-residential purposes, car showrooms were erected on the commercial site. In the 1980s a toy superstore opened on the site, causing traffic congestion along Crow Road and Balshgray Avenue before the attraction waned.
