= Great Western Hotel =

There are Great Western Hotels in several places, deriving their name from the Great Western Railway. These include

- Great Western Hotel (Newquay), in Cornwall
- Hilton London Paddington, formerly Great Western Hotel
- Malmaison Hotel, Reading, formerly Great Western Hotel
- Brass Monkey Hotel, formerly Great Western Hotel in Perth, Western Australia
