= Great Western Mine (Lake County, California) =

Mercury mine in California, United States

- Location in California
- Location: Middletown, California, United States; 38°42′54″N 122°38′30″W
- Products: Mercury
- Opened: 1873
- Closed: 1909

The Great Western Quicksilver Mine was a mercury mine in California, near Middletown in Lake County. The mining company was incorporated in 1872 and the mine produced from 1873 until 1909, when it was exhausted.

In 1880, Andrew Rocca was the superintendent of the Great Western Mine. His daughter, Helen Rocca Goss, wrote that the Great Western Quicksilver Mine employed 25 white miners and about 200 Chinese, a number consistent with numbers at Sulphur Bank Mine, located adjacent to Clear Lake.
