= Great Western Road =

Great Western Road may refer to:

- A road in Glasgow, Scotland, part of the A82 road trunk road
- A historical road in Shanghai, China, now part of Yan'an Road
- A historical road in New South Wales, Australia, now part of the Great Western Highway
- The Great Western Road (album), by Deacon Blue, 2025
- "The Great Western Road" (Coastal Railways with Julie Walters), a 2017 TV documentary episode

== See also ==
- Great West Road (disambiguation)
