= Great Western Cities =

Informal joint-city initiative in the United Kingdom

Great Western Cities (Welsh: Dinasoedd Mawr y Gorllewin) is a collaborative initiative launched in February 2015 by the cities of Bristol, in England, and Cardiff and Newport, in Wales, to improve cooperation in the area as a city region, and to develop economic and environmental partnerships.

The three cities are located on the Severn estuary and are linked by the M4 and M48 road bridges, and by rail via the Severn Tunnel. The joint initiative followed publication of a report in 2014, Unleashing Metro Growth, which proposed greater collaboration between cities and identified the Severn region as a ‘power-house city region’ critical to the UK economy as a whole.

== History ==
At the launch of the Great Western Cities initiative on 4 February 2015, it was said that the cities had a combined economic output of £58 billion, but could improve their competitiveness by better joint working. It was said that "investment in the region must focus on improving connectivity, realising the energy potential of the Severn Estuary and Bristol Channel and promoting the region as a high-quality destination for international business."

Phil Bale of the Cardiff City Council said that, if the initiative did not go ahead, "Cardiff would lose jobs and investment." Bristol's mayor, George Ferguson, said that the cities were, together, "the best economic powerhouse outside London." The Welsh Secretary Stephen Crabb said that: "By working together our great cities can pack a bigger economic punch to support business and private enterprise."

The toll on Severn Bridge was scrapped on 17th Dec 2018 onwards. While scrapping the toll, the Welsh secretary, Alun Cairns expressed his hope that:

“Toll-free, free-flow journeys between both communities will drive further economic benefits to all areas surrounding the crossings and the key economic centres in Cardiff, Bath, Bristol, Newport and across to Swansea and west Wales.”
