= Great Western Bank =

Great Western Bank may refer to:

- Great Western Bank (California), defunct bank headquartered in California and operational from 1919 to 1997
- Great Western Bank (South Dakota), defunct bank headquartered in South Dakota and operational from 1907 to 2022
- Great Western Bank and Trust, defunct bank headquartered in Arizona and operational from 1968 to 1986; owned by Citibank from 1986 to 1993, then acquired by Norwest
