= List of dam removals in California =

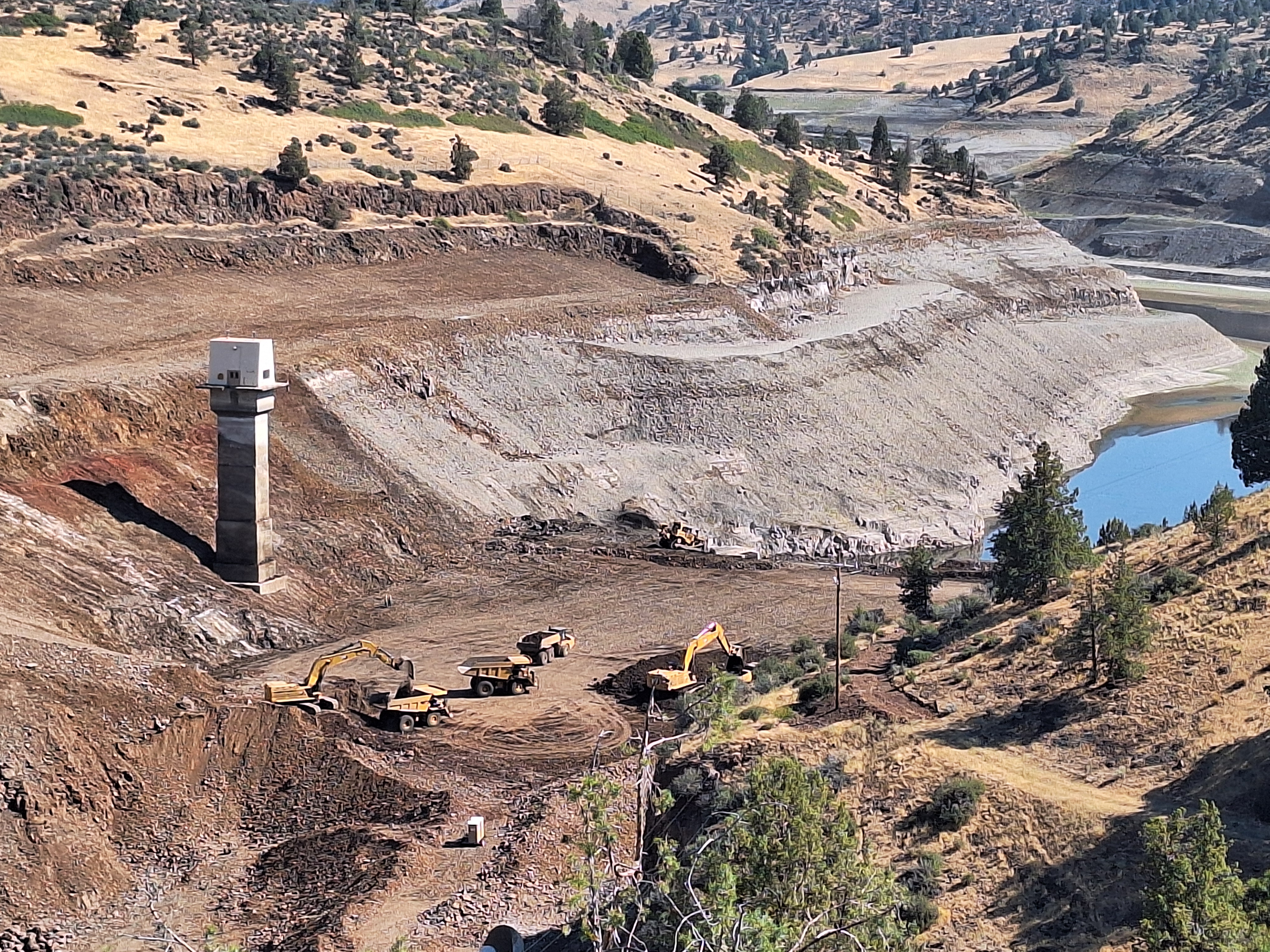
The 2024 removal of the Iron Gate Dam, part of the Klamath River restoration, the largest dam removal project in history.

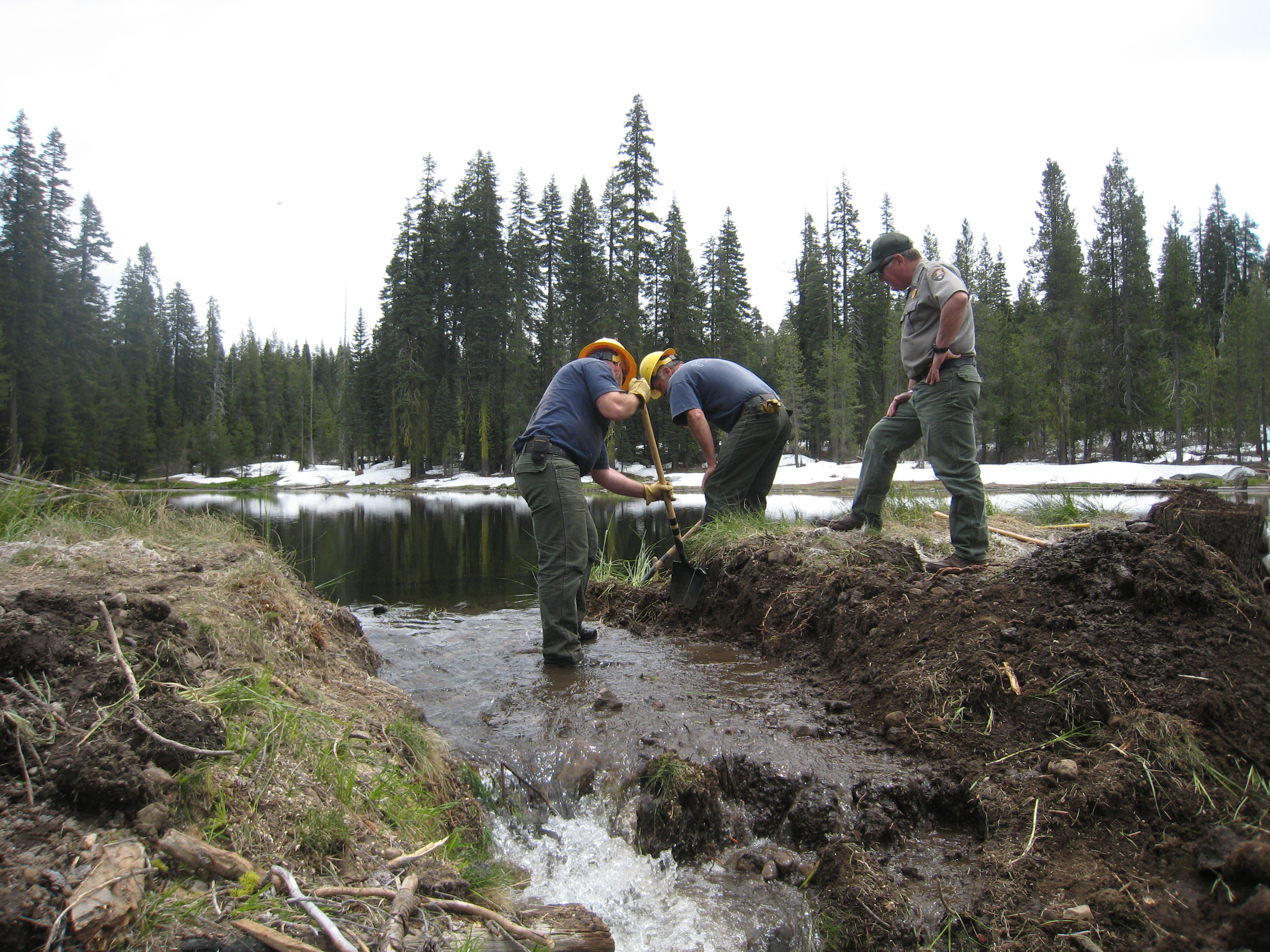
The 2011 breaching of the Dream Lake Dam in Lassen Volcanic National Park.

This is a list of dams in California that have been removed as physical impediments to free-flowing rivers or streams.

== Removals by watershed ==
=== Carmel River ===
Owned by California American Water, the San Clemente Dam on the Carmel River was deemed unsafe in 1992 by the Department of Water Resources. It was no longer serving its use by supplying water to the Monterey Peninsula and blocked steelhead from spawning upstream. It was demolished in 2015. Similarly, the Old Carmel River Dam was demolished in 2016.

=== Eel River ===
==== Proposed removals ====
The Pacific Gas and Electric Company has operated two hydroelectric dams on the Eel River as part of the Potter Valley Project: Scott Dam and Cape Horn Dam. In 2023 the company applied to demolish the dams amid growing issues with maintenance, environmental compliance, and seismic liability. The project would drain Lake Pillsbury and Lake Van Arsdale, making the Eel the longest free-flowing river in California and restoring hundreds of miles of habitat for endangered fish.

=== Klamath River ===
After more than 20 years of advocacy from the Un-Dam the Klamath movement, the four dams on the Lower Klamath River were removed in 2023 and 2024. Three of these were in California: Iron Gate Dam, Copco Number 1 Dam, and Copco Number 2 Dam. The removals are expected to improve salmon passage. As of 2025 this is considered the largest dam removal project in history.

=== San Joaquin River ===
==== Proposed removals ====
Completed in 1923, O'Shaughnessy Dam is a 430-foot-high (131 m) concrete arch-gravity dam on the Tuolumne River, a tributary of the San Joaquin River, flooding Hetch Hetchy Valley within Yosemite National Park. Considered the first great environmental controversy in the United States when constructed, O'Shaughnessy Dam continues to be controversial. Environmental groups such as Restore Hetch Hetchy lobby for breaching the dam and restoring the valley, while others argue that leaving the dam in place would be the better economic and environmental decision.

=== San Juan Creek and Santa Ana River ===
The Trabuco District Dam Removal Project is an initiative of the Cleveland National Forest to remove over 80 dams on four streams: San Juan Creek and its tributaries Holy Jim Creek and Trabuco Creek, as well as Silverado Creek, a tributary of the Santa Ana River. The "fish check dams" were originally built to create pools for a stocked rainbow trout fishery and to store water for conservation and fire suppression. The removals are intended to improve passage of fish and other aquatic species.

== Completed removals ==
Dam	Height	Year removed	Location	Watercourse	Watershed
Roy's Dam		2020		San Geronimo Creek	Tomales Bay
Rogers Dam	40 ft (12 m)	1983	Point Reyes Station; 38.0469°N 122.787°W	Tributary to Olema Creek	Tomales Bay
North Debris Dam	20 ft (6.1 m)	2002		Tributary to Los Angeles River	Los Angeles River
Trancas Debris Dam	15 ft (4.6 m)	2002		Tributary to Trancas Creek	Trancas Creek
HJFD1	2.5 ft (0.76 m)	2018	Orange County; 33.6793°N 117.5172°W	Holy Jim Creek	San Juan Creek
HJFD2	4 ft (1.2 m)	2018	Orange County; 33.6805°N 117.5173°W	Holy Jim Creek	San Juan Creek
HJFD3	3 ft (0.91 m)	2019	Orange County; 33.6827°N 117.5159°W	Holy Jim Creek	San Juan Creek
HJFD4	2 ft (0.61 m)	2019	Orange County; 33.6829°N 117.5159°W	Holy Jim Creek	San Juan Creek
HJFD5	5 ft (1.5 m)	2019	Orange County; 33.683°N 117.5159°W	Holy Jim Creek	San Juan Creek
HJFD6	2.3 ft (0.70 m)	2014	Orange County; 33.6833°N 117.516°W	Holy Jim Creek	San Juan Creek
HJFD7	2.5 ft (0.76 m)	2014	Orange County; 33.6833°N 117.516°W	Holy Jim Creek	San Juan Creek
HJFD8	5 ft (1.5 m)	2014	Orange County; 33.6835°N 117.516°W	Holy Jim Creek	San Juan Creek
HJFD9	2.3 ft (0.70 m)	2014	Orange County; 33.6837°N 117.516°W	Holy Jim Creek	San Juan Creek
HJFD10	1.5 ft (0.46 m)	2014	Orange County; 33.6837°N 117.516°W	Holy Jim Creek	San Juan Creek
HJFD11	1 ft (0.30 m)	2018	Orange County; 33.6838°N 117.5151°W	Holy Jim Creek	San Juan Creek
HJFD15	9.3 ft (2.8 m)	2017	Orange County; 33.6881°N 117.5125°W	Holy Jim Creek	San Juan Creek
HJFD16	2 ft (0.61 m)	2017	Orange County; 33.6888°N 117.5119°W	Holy Jim Creek	San Juan Creek
HJFD17	4 ft (1.2 m)	2017	Orange County; 33.6888°N 117.5119°W	Holy Jim Creek	San Juan Creek
HJFD18	3.5 ft (1.1 m)	2017	Orange County; 33.689°N 117.5118°W	Holy Jim Creek	San Juan Creek
HJFD19	2.5 ft (0.76 m)	2017	Orange County; 33.6891°N 117.5117°W	Holy Jim Creek	San Juan Creek
HJFD21	7.5–4.0 ft (2.3–1.2 m)	2018	Orange County; 33.6907°N 117.5118°W	Holy Jim Creek	San Juan Creek
HJFD22	5 ft (1.5 m)	2018	Orange County; 33.6909°N 117.5118°W	Holy Jim Creek	San Juan Creek
HJFD23	3.0–0.0 ft (0.91–0.00 m)	2018	Orange County; 33.6911°N 117.5118°W	Holy Jim Creek	San Juan Creek
HJFD25	4 ft (1.2 m)	2018	Orange County; 33.6915°N 117.5116°W	Holy Jim Creek	San Juan Creek
HJFD26	6.0–0.0 ft (1.8–0.0 m)	2018	Orange County; 33.6916°N 117.5115°W	Holy Jim Creek	San Juan Creek
HJFD29	6 ft (1.8 m)	2018	Orange County; 33.6922°N 117.5121°W	Holy Jim Creek	San Juan Creek
HJFD30	4 ft (1.2 m)	2018	Orange County; 33.6922°N 117.5121°W	Holy Jim Creek	San Juan Creek
HJFD31	6.0–0.0 ft (1.8–0.0 m)	2018	Orange County; 33.6923°N 117.5123°W	Holy Jim Creek	San Juan Creek
HJFD32	9.5–4.0 ft (2.9–1.2 m)	2018	Orange County; 33.6925°N 117.5127°W	Holy Jim Creek	San Juan Creek
HJFD33	6.8–0.0 ft (2.1–0.0 m)	2018	Orange County; 33.6928°N 117.5129°W	Holy Jim Creek	San Juan Creek
HJFD34	7.0–3.0 ft (2.13–0.91 m)	2018	Orange County; 33.6928°N 117.5132°W	Holy Jim Creek	San Juan Creek
HJFD34.1/35		2018	Orange County; 33.6928°N 117.5132°W	Holy Jim Creek	San Juan Creek
HJFD37	3 ft (0.91 m)	2018	Orange County; 33.693°N 117.5136°W	Holy Jim Creek	San Juan Creek
HJFD40	2.6 ft (0.79 m)	2018	Orange County; 33.6934°N 117.5142°W	Holy Jim Creek	San Juan Creek
HJFD41	2.8 ft (0.85 m)	2018	Orange County; 33.6935°N 117.5142°W	Holy Jim Creek	San Juan Creek
SJFD1	9 ft (2.7 m)	2018	Orange County; 33.5902°N 117.5018°W	San Juan Creek	San Juan Creek
SJFD2	2.5 ft (0.76 m)	2018	Orange County; 33.5903°N 117.5018°W	San Juan Creek	San Juan Creek
SJFD3	2.5–6 ft (0.76–1.83 m)	2018	Orange County; 33.5904°N 117.5017°W	San Juan Creek	San Juan Creek
SJFD4	5.0–9.0 ft (1.5–2.7 m)	2018	Orange County; 33.5905°N 117.5017°W	San Juan Creek	San Juan Creek
SJFD5	4.0–5.0 ft (1.2–1.5 m)	2018	Orange County; 33.5908°N 117.5015°W	San Juan Creek	San Juan Creek
SJFD6	0–3.4 ft (0.0–1.0 m)	2018	Orange County; 33.5908°N 117.5015°W	San Juan Creek	San Juan Creek
SJFD7	4.8 ft (1.5 m)	2018	Orange County; 33.5909°N 117.501°W	San Juan Creek	San Juan Creek
SJFD9	3.0–4.5 ft (0.91–1.37 m)	2018	Orange County; 33.5908°N 117.5002°W	San Juan Creek	San Juan Creek
SJFD10	2.0–3.0 ft (0.61–0.91 m)	2018	Orange County; 33.5907°N 117.4999°W	San Juan Creek	San Juan Creek
SJFD11	1.0–5.0 ft (0.30–1.52 m)	2018	Orange County; 33.5906°N 117.4998°W	San Juan Creek	San Juan Creek
SJFD12	10 ft (3.0 m)	2019	Orange County; 33.5906°N 117.4996°W	San Juan Creek	San Juan Creek
SJFD13	2 ft (0.61 m)	2019	Orange County; 33.5907°N 117.499°W	San Juan Creek	San Juan Creek
SJFD14	12 ft (3.7 m)	2019	Orange County; 33.5926°N 117.4973°W	San Juan Creek	San Juan Creek
SJFD15	4 ft (1.2 m)	2019	Orange County; 33.5928°N 117.4962°W	San Juan Creek	San Juan Creek
SJFD17	2 ft (0.61 m)	2019	Orange County; 33.5927°N 117.4716°W	San Juan Creek	San Juan Creek
SJFD18	3 ft (0.91 m)	2019	Orange County; 33.5925°N 117.4734°W	San Juan Creek	San Juan Creek
SJFD19	6 ft (1.8 m)	2019	Orange County; 33.5925°N 117.4749°W	San Juan Creek	San Juan Creek
SJFD20	10 ft (3.0 m)	2019	Orange County; 33.5929°N 117.4753°W	San Juan Creek	San Juan Creek
SJFD21	3 ft (0.91 m)	2019	Orange County; 33.5921°N 117.4709°W	San Juan Creek	San Juan Creek
SJFD22	2 ft (0.61 m)	2019	Orange County; 33.5921°N 117.4708°W	San Juan Creek	San Juan Creek
SJFD23	13 ft (4.0 m)	2019	Orange County; 33.5942°N 117.4681°W	San Juan Creek	San Juan Creek
SJFD24	5 ft (1.5 m)	2019	Orange County; 33.5921°N 117.4708°W	San Juan Creek	San Juan Creek
SJFD25	2 ft (0.61 m)	2019	Orange County; 33.5942°N 117.4681°W	San Juan Creek	San Juan Creek
SJFD26	5 ft (1.5 m)	2019	Orange County; 33.5938°N 117.4667°W	San Juan Creek	San Juan Creek
SJFD27	5 ft (1.5 m)	2019	Orange County; 33.5937°N 117.4663°W	San Juan Creek	San Juan Creek
SJFD28	4.5–5.0 ft (1.4–1.5 m)	2018	Orange County; 33.5973°N 117.4624°W	San Juan Creek	San Juan Creek
SJFD29	1.5–2.0 ft (0.46–0.61 m)	2018	Orange County; 33.5978°N 117.4618°W	San Juan Creek	San Juan Creek
SJFD30	2.5 ft (0.76 m)	2018	Orange County; 33.598°N 117.4615°W	San Juan Creek	San Juan Creek
SJFD31	4.0–4.5 ft (1.2–1.4 m)	2018	Orange County; 33.5993°N 117.4614°W	San Juan Creek	San Juan Creek
TCFD7	6 ft (1.8 m)	2014	Orange County; 33.6742°N 117.526°W	Trabuco Creek	San Juan Creek
TCFD9	9 ft (2.7 m)	2014	Orange County; 33.6744°N 117.525°W	Trabuco Creek	San Juan Creek
TCFD10	2.5 ft (0.76 m)	2014	Orange County; 33.6744°N 117.525°W	Trabuco Creek	San Juan Creek
TCFD11	6.5 ft (2.0 m)	2014	Orange County; 33.6745°N 117.525°W	Trabuco Creek	San Juan Creek
TCFD11	6.5 ft (2.0 m)	2018	Orange County; 33.6744°N 117.5251°W	Trabuco Creek	San Juan Creek
SCFD4	10 ft (3.0 m)	2019	Orange County; 33.75193°N 117.57539°W	Silverado Creek	Santa Ana River
SCFD5	3 ft (0.91 m)	2019	Orange County; 33.75209°N 117.57513°W	Silverado Creek	Santa Ana River
SCFD7	6.5 ft (2.0 m)	2017	Orange County; 33.7514°N 117.5711°W	Silverado Creek	Santa Ana River
SCFD8	6.5 ft (2.0 m)	2017	Orange County; 33.7517°N 117.571°W	Silverado Creek	Santa Ana River
SCFD10	7.5 ft (2.3 m)	2017	Orange County; 33.7519°N 117.5705°W	Silverado Creek	Santa Ana River
SCFD12	4 ft (1.2 m)	2017	Orange County; 33.7522°N 117.5681°W	Silverado Creek	Santa Ana River
Glenbrook Gulch Dam	10 ft (3.0 m)	2010	Mendocino County; 39.2653°N 123.669°W	Glenbrook Gulch	Albion River
Unknown		2014	Irmulco; 39.4205°N 123.502°W	Olds Creek	Noyo River
D.B. Fields/Johnson Dam		1946	Mendocino County; 39.2951°N 123.399°W	Rice Creek	Big River
McGowan Dam	6 ft (1.8 m)	1998		Butte Creek	Butte Creek
Western Canal East Dam	10 ft (3.0 m)	1998		Butte Creek	Butte Creek
Western Canal Main Dam	10 ft (3.0 m)	1998		Butte Creek	Butte Creek
McPherrin Dam	12 ft (3.7 m)	1998	Biggs; 39.4467°N 121.874°W	Butte Creek	Butte Creek
Old Carmel River Dam	32 ft (9.8 m)	2016	Monterey; 36.4388°N 121.7048°W	Carmel River	Carmel River
San Clemente Dam	106 ft (32 m)	2015	Monterey County; 36.4359°N 121.7088°W	Carmel River	Carmel River
Pennington Creek Dam		2018	San Luis Obispo; 35.3436°N 120.7328°W	Pennington Creek	Morro Bay
Upper Dam (Lost Man Dam)	7 ft (2.1 m)	1989	41.3291°N 124.0219°W	Lost Man Creek	Redwood Creek
Sweasey Dam	55 ft (17 m)	1970	Arcata; 40.8196°N 123.956°W	Mad River	Mad River
East Mill Creek Barrier	12 ft (3.7 m)	2008	Humboldt County; 40.3215°N 124.273°W	East Mill Creek	Mattole River
Cahill Dam	8 ft (2.4 m)	2013	Santa Cruz; 37.038°N 121.986°W	Branciforte Creek	Monterey Bay
Tucker Road Ford	5 ft (1.5 m)	2006	Los Gatos; 37.0999°N 121.958°W	Soquel Creek	Monterey Bay
Crocker Creek Dam	30 ft (9.1 m)	2002	Cloverdale; 38.7771°N 122.959°W	Crocker Creek	Russian River
Camp Meeker Dam	12 ft (3.7 m)	2009	Occidental; 38.4247°N 122.959°W	Dutch Bill Creek	Russian River
Fife Creek Check Dam		2010	Guerneville; 38.5334°N 123.004°W	Fife Creek	Russian River
Dempster Vineyard Dam	6.6 ft (2.0 m)	2018	Forestville; 38.4861°N 122.9183°W	Green Valley Creek	Russian River
Iron Horse Dam	10 ft (3.0 m)	2019	Sonoma County; 38.4632°N 122.8968°W	Green Valley Creek	Russian River
Mumford Dam		2003	Redwood Valley; 39.2774°N 123.208°W	West Fork Russian River	Russian River
Shasta River Water Association Diversion Dam		2009	Shasta County; 40.8534°N 122.347°W	Nelson Creek	Sacramento River
Wildcat Dam		2009	Anderson; 40.4202°N 121.961°W	North Fork Battle Creek	Sacramento River
Double U Fish Ranch Dam	27 ft (8.2 m)	2023	Modoc County; 41.4555°N 120.9008°W	Howards Gulch	Sacramento River
Beale Dam	12 ft (3.7 m)	2020	Beale Air Force Base; 39.1084°N 121.3385°W	Dry Creek	Sacramento River
Dream Lake Dam		2011	Lassen Volcanic National Park; 40.442°N 121.4084°W	Hot Springs Creek	Sacramento River
McCormick-Saeltzer Dam	18 ft (5.5 m)	2000	Redding; 40.4932°N 122.471°W	Clear Creek	Sacramento River
Hammer Diversion Dam		2014	Red Bluff; 40.1234°N 122.722°W	South Fork Cottonwood Creek	Sacramento River
Percolation Dam		2009	Solano County; 38.5216°N 121.965°W	Putah Creek	Sacramento River
Swim Dam #1		2001	Sunol; 37.5129°N 121.827°W	Alameda Creek	San Francisco Bay
Swim Dam #2		2001	Sunol; 37.5109°N 121.826°W	Alameda Creek	San Francisco Bay
Sunol Dam		2006	Sunol; 37.5944°N 121.902°W	Alameda Creek	San Francisco Bay
Niles Dam		2006	Union City; 37.5859°N 121.963°W	Alameda Creek	San Francisco Bay
Bear Creek Dam #3	7 ft (2.1 m)	2012	Woodside; 37.4151°N 122.243°W	Bear Creek	San Francisco Bay
Columbine Dam	24 ft (7.3 m)	2021	Santa Clara; 37.3534°N 121.7935°W	Flint Creek	San Francisco Bay
Bonde Weir	2.1 ft (0.64 m)	2013	Palo Alto; 37.4474°N 122.17°W	San Francisquito Creek	San Francisco Bay
Lagunita Diversion Dam	8 ft (2.4 m)	2018	Palo Alto; 37.4234°N 122.1742°W	San Francisquito Creek	San Francisco Bay
Unnamed Small Dam #1		1998		Guadalupe River	San Francisco Bay
Unnamed Small Dam #2		1998		Guadalupe River	San Francisco Bay
Memorial Park Dam		2015	San Mateo County; 37.2739°N 122.2885°W	Pescadero Creek	Pescadero Creek
Waterman Dam	12 ft (3.7 m)	2009	Boulder Creek; 37.2144°N 122.1761°W	Waterman Creek	Pescadero Creek
Lower Mill Creek Dam	15 ft (4.6 m)	2021	Santa Cruz; 37.0426°N 122.1686°W	Mill Creek	San Vicente River
Hall Wines Dam (Dry Creek Dam)		2008	Napa County; 38.3771°N 122.316°W	Dry Creek	Napa River
Milliken Creek Dam	13 ft (4.0 m)	2017	Napa County; 38.349°N 122.2635°W	Milliken Creek	Napa River
York Creek Diversion Structure		2004	St. Helena; 38.5095°N 122.496°W	York Creek	Napa River
York Dam	24 ft (7.3 m)	2020	St. Helena; 38.509°N 122.496°W	York Creek	Napa River
Maria Ygnacio Debris Basin Dam East Branch	20 ft (6.1 m)	2019	Santa Barbara County; 34.4606°N 119.7912°W	East Branch Maria Ygnacio Creek	Atascadero Creek
Maria Ygnacio Aijian Barrier	5 ft (1.5 m)	2014	Santa Barbara; 34.4664°N 119.7943°W	Maria Ygnacio Creek	Atascadero Creek
Maria Ygnacio Debris Basin Dam Main Branch	20 ft (6.1 m)	2019	Santa Barbara County; 34.4752°N 119.7919°W	Maria Ygnacio Creek	Atascadero Creek
Lion Creek Diversion Dam	3 ft (0.91 m)	2014	Ojai; 34.5444°N 119.164°W	Lion Creek	Santa Clara River
Horse Creek Dam	12 ft (3.7 m)	2006	Los Padres National Forest; 34.8376°N 120.017°W	Horse Creek	Santa Maria River
Rodeo Grounds Berm	12 to 18 ft (3.7 to 5.5 m)	2008	Los Angeles County; 34.0419°N 118.5796°W	Topanga Creek	Santa Monica Bay
Trout Haven Dam			Six Rivers National Forest; 41.8905°N 123.815°W	Monkey Creek	Smith River
Benbow Dam	20 ft (6.1 m)	2016	Eureka; 40.0666°N 123.7961°W	South Fork Eel River	Eel River
Cedar Creek Hatchery Dam	20 ft (6.1 m)	2022	Leggett; 39.8398°N 123.7075°W	Cedar Creek	Eel River
Salt Creek Dam	10 ft (3.0 m)		Mendocino National Forest; 39.2931°N 122.795°W	Salt Creek	Eel River
Bear Valley Dam	15 ft (4.6 m)	1982	Point Reyes National Seashore; 37.9933°N 122.814°W		Drakes Bay
Lower Murphy Dam	6 ft (1.8 m)		Inverness; 38.0694°N 122.918°W	Home Bay	Drakes Bay
Upper Murphy Dam	25 ft (7.6 m)		Point Reyes National Seashore; 38.0853°N 122.904°W	Home Ranch Creek	Drakes Bay
Haypress Pond Dam	20 ft (6.1 m)	2003	Golden Gate National Recreation Area; 37.8629°N 122.547°W	Tributary to Tennessee Valley	Tennessee Cove
Copco Number 1 Dam	132 ft (40 m)	2024	Siskiyou County; 41°58′48″N 122°20′04″W	Klamath River	Klamath River
Iron Gate Dam	173 ft (53 m)	2024	Siskiyou County; 41°56′02″N 122°26′07″W	Klamath River	Klamath River
Copco Number 2 Dam	33 ft (10 m)	2023	Siskiyou County; 41.9789°N 122.3400°W	Klamath River	Klamath River
East Weaver Creek Dam	12 ft (3.7 m)	2023	Weaverville; 40.777°N 122.9298°W	East Weaver Creek	Klamath River
Hostler Creek Dam	14 ft (4.3 m)	2012	Hoopa; 41.0787°N 123.668°W	Hostler Creek	Klamath River
Minnie Reeves Dam	20 ft (6.1 m)	2002	Douglas City; 40.6381°N 122.908°W	Indian Creek	Klamath River
Little Shasta River Flashboard Dam		2019	Siskiyou County	Little Shasta River	Klamath River
Araujo Dam		2007	Siskiyou County; 41.6876°N 122.53°W	Shasta River	Klamath River
Grenada Irrigation District Dam	12 ft (3.7 m)	2012	Siskiyou County; 41.727°N 122.5575°W	Shasta River	Klamath River
Quinn Dam	14 ft (4.3 m)	1951		East Fork North Fork Trinity River	Klamath River
Lone Jack Dam	24 ft (7.3 m)			East Fork North Fork Trinity River	Klamath River
Todd Dam	14 ft (4.3 m)	1949		East Fork North Fork Trinity River	Klamath River
Trinity Cty. Water & Power Co. Dam	10 ft (3.0 m)	1946		East Fork Trinity River	Klamath River
North Fork Placers Dam	15 ft (4.6 m)	1950		North Fork Trinity River	Klamath River
Whites Gulch Upper Dam		2008	Etna; 41.2818°N 123.0757°W	Whites Gulch	Klamath River
White Gulch Dam #1 (Whites Gulch Lower Dam)		2008	Siskiyou County; 41.2909°N 123.083°W	Whites Gulch	Klamath River
Smith Dam	8 ft (2.4 m)	1949		Whites Gulch	Klamath River
Bonally Mining Co. Dam	11 ft (3.4 m)	1946		North Fork Salmon River	Klamath River
Bennett-Smith Dam	10 ft (3.0 m)	1950		South Fork Salmon River	Klamath River
Barton Dam	12 ft (3.7 m)	1950		South Fork Scott River	Klamath River
Rooney Bros Dam		2008	Sacramento County; 38.3582°N 121.343°W	Cosumnes River	Mokelumne River
Murphy Creek Dam (Sparrow Dam)	12 ft (3.7 m)	2003	Clements; 38.234°N 121.0264°W	Murphy Creek	Mokelumne River
East Panther Creek Dam	12 ft (3.7 m)	2016	Amador County; 38.49°N 120.3975°W	East Panther Creek	Mokelumne River
West Panther Creek Dam	14 ft (4.3 m)	2003	Amador County; 38.4929°N 120.3933°W	West Panther Creek	Mokelumne River
Camp Nine Dam		2012	Vallecito; 38.1358°N 120.377°W	Stanislaus River	San Joaquin River
Cascade Diversion Dam	18 ft (5.5 m)	2003	El Portal; 37.7183°N 119.682°W	Merced River	San Joaquin River
Dennett Dam	10 ft (3.0 m)	2018	Modesto; 37.6273°N 120.9878°W	Tuolumne River	San Joaquin River
Ojai Valley Trail Ford		2011	Oak View; 34.3798°N 119.307°W	San Antonio Creek	Ventura River
Arco Pond Dam	10 ft (3.0 m)				
Happy Isles Dam	8 ft (2.4 m)	1987			
C-Lind Dam #1	56 ft (17 m)	1993			
Three C. Picket Dam		1949		Beaver Creek	
Big Creek Manufacturing Dam	14 ft (4.3 m)			Big Creek	
A-Frame Dam	30 ft (9.1 m)	2003		Brandy Creek	
Point Four Dam	6 ft (1.8 m)	1993		Butte Creek	
Henry Danninbrink Dam		1927		Canyon Creek	
Red Hill Mining Do. Dam	30 ft (9.1 m)	1951		Canyon Creek	
Lake Christopher Dam	10 ft (3.0 m)	1994		Cold Creek	
Unnamed dam	5 ft (1.5 m)	2002		Ferrari Creek	
Russell Dam (Hinkley Dam)	11 ft (3.4 m)	1922		Hayfork Creek	
Hessellwood Dam	10 ft (3.0 m)	1925		Hayfork Creek	
Big Nugget Mine Dam	12 ft (3.7 m)	1949		Horse Creek	
D.B. Fields Dam	6 ft (1.8 m)	1947		Indian Creek	
Altoona Dam	12 ft (3.7 m)	1947		Kidder Creek	
Clarissa V. Mining Dam	20 ft (6.1 m)	1950		Redding Creek	
Anderline Dam	20 ft (6.1 m)	1936		Rush Creek	
Unnamed Arizona Crossing		2002		Solstice Creek	
Moser Dam		1949		Swillup Creek	
Unnamed dam		2006		Ward Creek	
Unnamed dam	6 ft (1.8 m)	1992		Wildcat Creek	
Unnamed dam	6 ft (1.8 m)	1992		Wildcat Creek	

== Planned and proposed removals ==
Dam	Height	Expected year	Location	Watercourse	Watershed
Matilija Dam	198 ft (60 m)		Ojai; 34.4850°N 119.3082°W	Matilija Creek	Ventura River
Rindge Dam	100 ft (30 m)	2025–2035	Malibu Creek State Park; 34.0646°N 118.6993°W	Malibu Creek	Santa Monica Bay
Scott Dam	138 ft (42 m)	2028 or later	Lake County; 39.4075°N 122.9592°W	Eel River	Eel River
Cape Horn Dam	63 ft (19 m)	2028 or later	Mendocino County; 39.3862°N 123.1166°W	Eel River	Eel River
