= Cold Creek (Russian River tributary) =

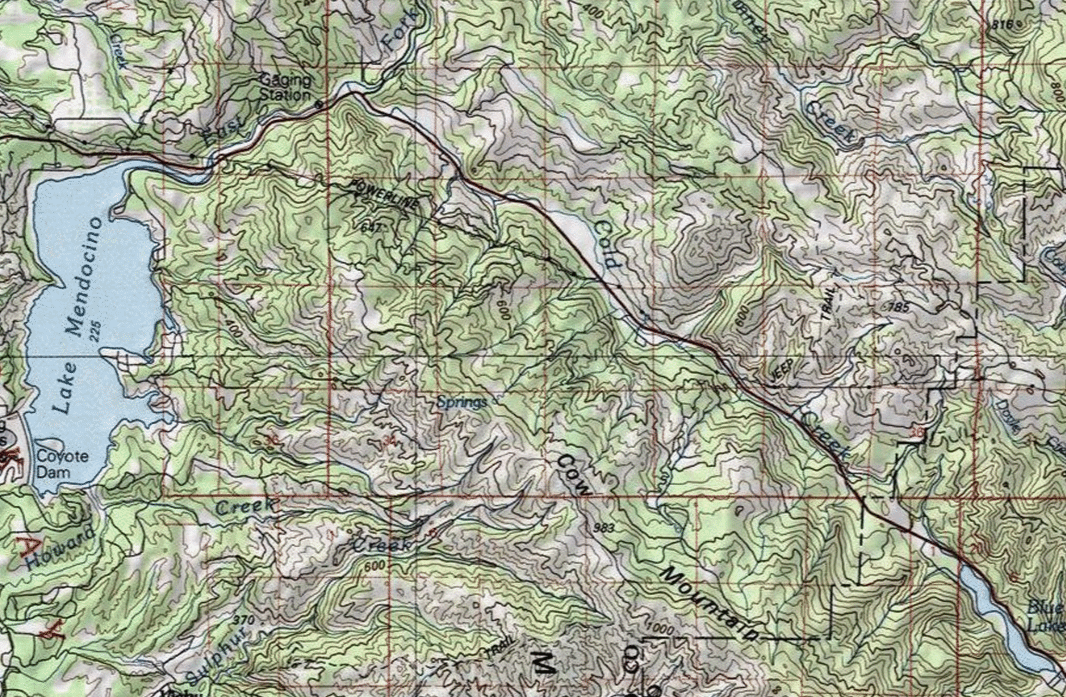
- Cold Creek flowing from just west of Blue Lakes in a northwest direction to the east fork of Russian River

- Location within California Location within the United States

Location
- Country: United States
- State: California
- County: Mendocino County

Physical characteristics
- Mouth: East Fork Russian River
  - coordinates: 39.247294°N 123.128911°W

Cold Creek is a river of Mendocino County, California, a tributary of East Fork Russian River. In the past it may have connected Clear Lake to the Russian River before this route was blocked by a large landslide and Clear Lake began to drain into the Sacramento River watershed.

== Location ==
Cold Creek is 8.5 miles (13.7 km) long. It is a left tributary of East Fork Russian River. The Ukiah Valley extends up the Russian River to the junction of the east fork with the main stream. Above this along the east fork to the confluence of Cold Creek it is known as Coyote Valley (cō'dakai). Above Cold Creek to the head of the east fork it is called Potter Valley (djūhū'la-kai).

A 1914 survey of the Ukiah Area said the Cold Creek Valley was small and not very important agriculturally. It was interesting because it belonged to a middle-aged stream that was now tributary to a very youthful stream. The East Fork of the Russian River has a youthful topography, flowing with a high gradient through a V-shaped gorge. Cold Creek flows at a much lower gradient, as is shown by the size of stones in its bed, and has a distinct flood plain and also a terrace.

According to the California Regional Water Quality Control Board, Cold Creek is in the Ukiah Hydrologic Sub Area of the Russian River Hydrologic Area. According to the Russian River Watershed Association, the Cold Creek watershed is in the Coyote Valley Hydrologic Sub-Area.

== Course changes ==
The Clear Lake basin lies between the watersheds of the Sacramento River and the Russian River. When it was formed about 600,000 years ago it flowed east into the Sacramento Valley. About 200,000 years ago the Clear Lake Volcanic Field blocked its outlet. The lake rose until it found a new outlet, draining west through the Blue Lakes into Cold Creek and the Russian River. At some time in the last 10,000 years a landslide at the west end of the Blue Lakes blocked this outlet, the lake rose again, and created its present outlet via Cache Creek to the Sacramento River.

The Northern Pomos have a legend that water from Clear Lake once drained west through the Blue Lakes, then through Cold Creek into Coyote Valley and the Russian River. Then there was a great earthquake and a huge landslide blocked the flow out of Clear Lake. The land was forced up, and Clear Lake began to drain to the east through Cache Creek. This is plausible, since there have been tectonic events in the region and Clear Lake is 600 feet (180 m) higher than the Ukiah Valley. The gradual mountain pass between Cold Creek basin and Upper Blue Lake is called Da-no lokj'tam, or "mountain fell-in", by the Northern Pomo.

According to Professor R. S. Holway (1907) the waters of Blue Lakes and Scotts Creek once drained into Russian River by way of Cold Creek, but in recent prehistorical times a large landslide formed a ridge that diverted these waters to Clear Lake. This could account for the relatively mature profile of Cold Creek. The alternation of the Clear Lake drainage route explains why there are many fish species common to the Russian River and the Sacramento River.

At one time the lower part of what is now East Fork Russian River from the present mouth of Cold Creek down through Coyote Valley to Russian River proper was also called Cold Creek. In 1908 the Potter Valley Project transferred water from the Eel River to the powerhouse in Potter Valley, and its discharge flowed out through the East Fork Russian River, to which Cold Creek is a tributary. Before the Eel River water was diverted, the East Fork would nearly dry up in July, August and September. A flour mill in Coyote Valley on the East Fork had water to drive its wheel carried from Cold Creek, which runs year round, along 1.5 miles (2.4 km) of flume.

== Fish ==
The effect of the course changes was to transfer fish from the Sacramento River to the Russian River. In May 1939 the California Division of Fish and Game released 8,000 steelhead trout into the creek. Fish today include rainbow trout, carp, sucker, bream/bluegill, steelhead trout and catfish.

== Sources ==
- "3.6 Hydrologic Sub-Areas" (PDF), Russian River Storm Water Resources Plan, Russian River Watershed Association, 2019
- Barrett, Samuel Alfred (1908), The ethno-geography of the Pomo and neighboring Indians
- "Cold Creek Fishing", HookandBullet.com
- "Cold Creek", Geographic Names Information System, United States Geological Survey, United States Department of the Interior
- Cook, David G.; Chase, Shawn D.; Manning, David J. (2010), "Distribution and Ecology of the Russian River Tule Perch", California Fish and Game, 96 (2): 146–164
- Fish Stocking Record (PDF), California Division of Fish and Game, 29 May 1939
- Kaplan, Victoria D. (February 1979), An Interpretive History of Coyote Dam, Mendocino County, California (PDF), US Army Corps of Engineers
- Kuhlman, Catherine (4 May 2009), Cold Creek Crossing WDID No. 1B08132WNME (PDF), California Environmental Protection Agency
- Lundquist, Erica (February 2010b), Middle Creek Watershed Assessment (PDF), Middle Creek Coordinated Resource Management and Planning Group, archived from the original (PDF) on 2021-05-17
- Martinez, Jody (13 January 2018), "Mendocino County history: Remembering floods near Ukiah", The Ukiah Daily Journal
- "Timeline: The Russian River: Earliest Times", Potter Valley Project, Mendocino County Inland Water & Power Commission
- Watson, E.B.; Pendleton, R.L. (1919), "Soil Survey of the Ukiah Area, California", Field Operations of the Bureau of Soils, vol. 16, United States Bureau of Soils, p. 2636 (Soil Survey of the Ukiah Area, California at the Internet Archive)
- Welch, James R. (2013-05-10), Sprouting Valley: Historical Ethnobotany of the Northern Pomo from Potter Valley, California, Society of Ethnobiology, ISBN 978-0-9887330-2-2
