= East Fork Russian River =

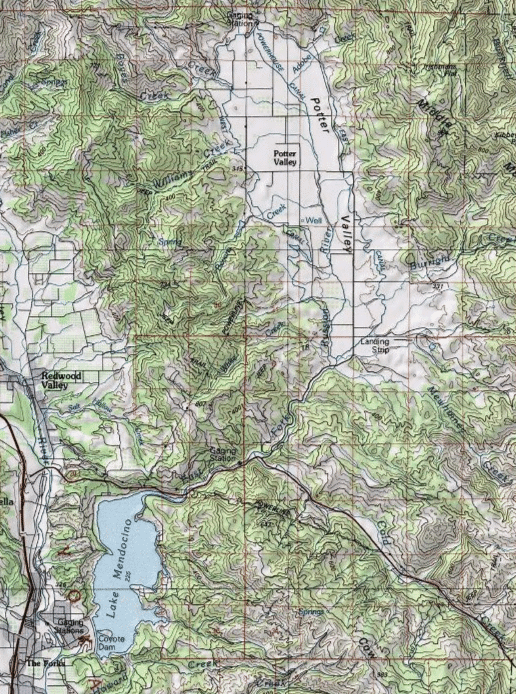
- Course of the River through the Potter Valley in the north and Lake Mendocino.

- Location within California Location within the United States

Location
- Country: United States
- State: California
- County: Mendocino County

Physical characteristics
- Source
  - coordinates: 39°20′42″N 123°07′02″W
- Mouth: Russian River (California)
  - coordinates: 39°11′23″N 123°11′59″W
  - elevation: 623 ft (190 m)
- Length: 15 mi (24 km)

Basin features
- River system: Russian River (California)
- Tributaries
  - left: Adobe Creek, Burright Creek, Mewhinney Creek, Cold Creek
  - right: Busch Creek, Williams Creek, Bevans Creek, White Creek
- Waterbodies: Lake Mendocino

East Fork Russian River is a 15 mi (24 km) long tributary of the Russian River in Mendocino County, California artificially connected to the Eel River via an interbasin diversion at the Potter Valley Project hydroelectric facility. It forms in the north of Potter Valley, flows south through this valley, then southwest through a mountain pass to Lake Mendocino, an artificial reservoir that empties into Russian River. At one time Clear Lake to the east drained through Cold Creek then along the lower part of East Fork Russian River through Coyote Valley to the Russian River proper. A few hundred years ago a massive landslide blocked this channel, and Clear Lake found a new outlet to the Sacramento River.

Cold Creek flows year round, while the upper part of East Fork Russian River used to dry up in the summer leaving isolated pools along its course. This changed when the Potter Valley Project was completed in 1908. The project involved construction of two reservoirs on Eel River to the north of the Russian River basin, and a tunnel to the head of Potter Valley that carried water from Eel River to a hydroelectric station that discharged into East Fork Russian River. The Eel River water was used to irrigate Potter Valley, and supplied water to Ukiah below the convergence with Russian River. In 1958 Coyote Dam was built on East Fork Russian River just above its mouth on Russian River, flooding Coyote Valley to form Lake Mendocino. The lake provides additional water storage as well as flood control.

The continuous flow from the Potter Valley Project changed the fish ecosystem in the Russian River by eliminating the warm, still pools that had been used for breeding by native fish. In the 1950s the state introduced poison to the river to eliminate "useless" fish species in favor of game species. The Coyote Dam prevented steelhead trout from returning upstream, so today the East Fork Russian River is dominated by rainbow trout. The section of the river that flows through the mountains between Potter Valley and Lake Mendocino includes stretches of white water that are challenging for kayakers and rafters.

== Watershed ==
The East Fork Russian River is a 15 mi (24 km) long tributary of the Russian River in Mendocino County. It drains the northeastern part of the Russian River basin. The region has a Mediterranean climate. The fork's watershed covers 67,073 acres (271.43 km^{2}). The mouth elevation is about 623 ft (190 m) above sea level. East Fork Russian River forms in the north end of Potter Valley and flows south through a canyon to Coyote Valley, now filled by Lake Mendocino.

Potter Valley is an alluvial valley, a depression created by movement of parallel faults that has filled with gravel, boulders and cobble eroded from the surrounding mountains. The basement rock is Franciscan Complex, a jumbled mixture of different types of rock that is very prone to erosion and landslides. Coyote Valley is a southerly trending valley about 1 to 1.5 mi (1.6 to 2.4 km) wide by 3 mi (4.8 km) long that is underlain primarily by metamorphic rocks from the Franciscan formation. Most of the recreation areas located within the Lake Mendocino boundary have 6 to 12 inches of silt, or sandy silt, overlying the gravelly phase, older alluvium.

Coyote Valley is flanked by rolling hills that rise 400 ft (120 m) about the valley floor to the west of Lake Mendocino and steeper Franciscan bedrock hills to the east. Elevations above mean sea level in the surrounding region range from about 600 ft (180 m) in the valleys near Ukiah to about 3,975 ft (1,212 m) on top of Cow Mountain to the east. The hills to the east of Lake Mendocino are very rugged and continue for many miles. To the west and northwest, the hills are more rounded with benches that were once planted with vineyards.

In a period of very low water in September 1905 the East Fork Russian River had a discharge of 2.2 cu ft/s (3.7 m^{3}/min). A discharge measurement station is located 1,300 ft (400 m) upstream from the Russian River and 500 ft (150 m) downstream from the Coyote Dam, which impounds Lake Mendocino. At this point the maximum discharge of the East Fork Russian River before regulation by Lake Mendocino was 13,300 ft^{2}/s (74,000 m^{2}/min), recorded on 21 December 1955. Since then the maximum discharge was 7,350 ft^{2}/s (41,000 m^{2}/min), recorded on 24 January 1970.

== Course ==
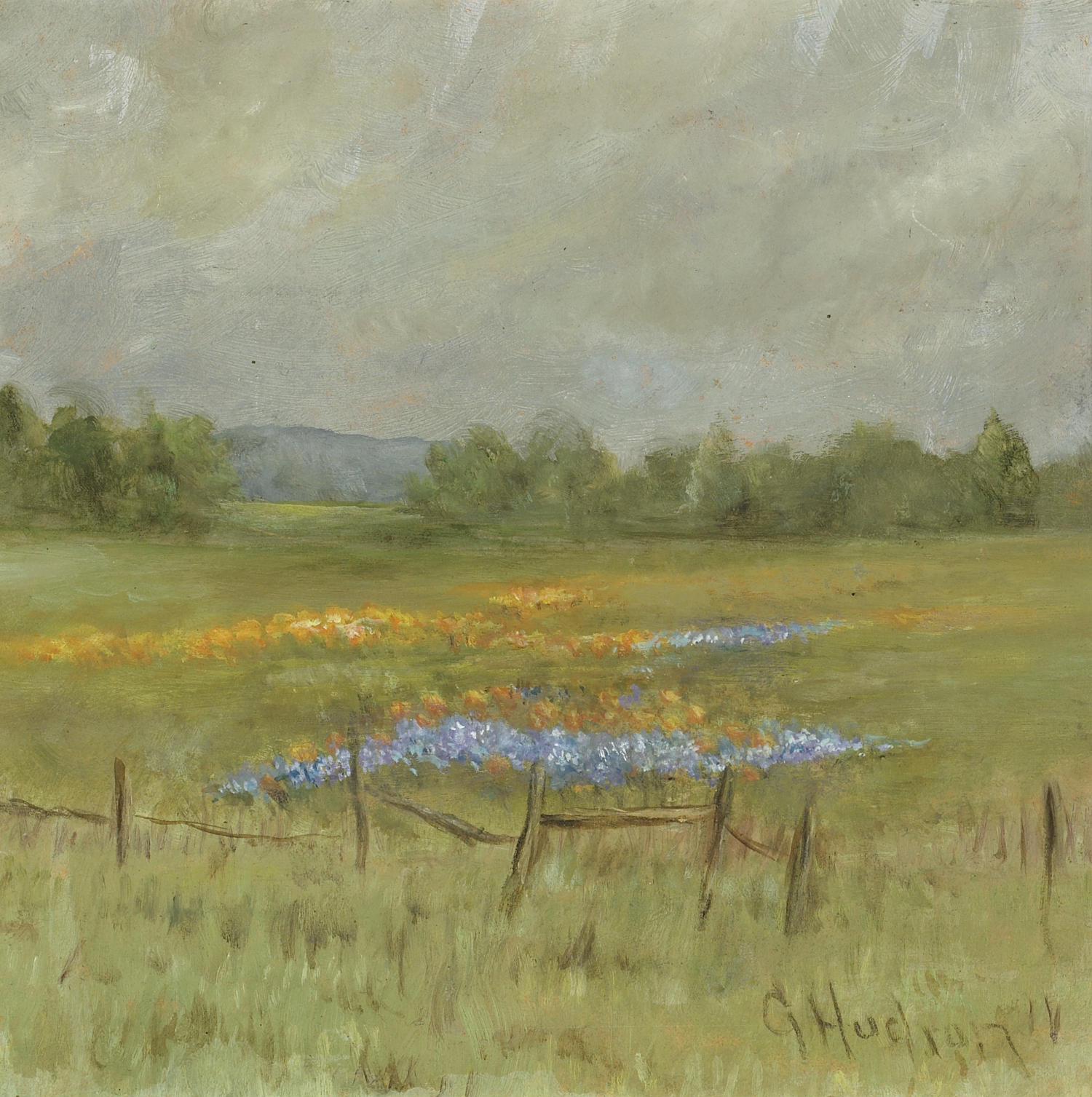
Poppy Scene in Potter Valley by Grace Carpenter Hudson

Tributaries in the Potter Valley include Adobe Creek, Burright Creek and Mewhinney Creek from the left and Busch Creek, Williams Creek, Bevans Creek and White Creek from the right. Today the river's primary source of water is the Powerhouse Canal from the Potter Valley Project. The project began to transfer water from the Eel River into the East Fork Russian River in 1908 to generate electricity and support irrigation. The water has been used in the Potter Valley for alfafa, grapes and rice. The river flows south through the valley, then runs southwest through mountainous territory to Lake Mendocino, formed by the Coyote Dam near the point where East Fork enters the main Russian River.

In the canyon between Potter Valley and Lake Mendocino, the East Fork receives the left tributary Cold Creek, which flows from Lake County to the east. A 1914 survey of the Ukiah Area said the Cold Creek Valley was small and not very important agriculturally. It was interesting because it belonged to a middle-aged stream that was now tributary to a very youthful stream. The East Fork of the Russian River has a youthful topography in this section, flowing with a high gradient through a V-shaped gorge. Cold Creek flows at a much lower gradient, as is shown by the size of stones in its bed, and has a distinct flood plain and also a terrace.

California State Route 20 runs east from Route 101 to the north of Ukiah. It skirts the north shore of Lake Mendocino and then crosses East Fork Russian River near the northeast corner of the lake. It follows the river for about two miles, then turns to the southeast along Cold Creek. Potter Valley Road continues from Highway 20 along East Fork Russian River, which it crosses twice before reaching Potter Valley. McKee Park is in the south of Potter Valley beside the Potter Valley Road and stretches along the East Fork Russian River for about 2 mi (3.2 km). This section of the river is shaded by various types of native oaks and bay trees. The waters may be dangerous, and there are no attendants, but visitors may wade, swim or fish along the river.

== Geological changes ==
Clear Lake, to the east of the Russian River, formed about 600,000 years ago as the land in the region began to subside when the Clear Lake Volcanic Field erupted. The Clear Lake basin lies between the watersheds of the Sacramento River and the Russian River. When it was formed it drained east into the Sacramento Valley. About 200,000 years ago the Clear Lake Volcanic Field blocked the lake's outlet. The lake rose until it found a new outlet, draining west through the Blue Lakes into Cold Creek and the Russian River. This could account for the relatively mature profile of Cold Creek. At some time in the last 10,000 years a landslide at the west end of the Blue Lakes blocked Clear Lake's outlet to the Russian River watershed. The lake rose again, and created its present outlet via Cache Creek to the Sacramento River.

At one time the lower part of what is now East Fork Russian River from the present mouth of Cold Creek down through Coyote Valley to Russian River proper was also called Cold Creek. In 1908 the Potter Valley Project transferred water from the Eel River to the powerhouse in Potter Valley, and its discharge flowed out through the East Fork Russian River, to which Cold Creek is a tributary. Before the Eel River water was diverted, the East Fork would nearly dry up in July, August and September. A flour mill in Coyote Valley had water to drive its wheel carried from Cold Creek, which runs year round, along 1.5 mi (2.4 km) of flume.

== Potter Valley Project ==
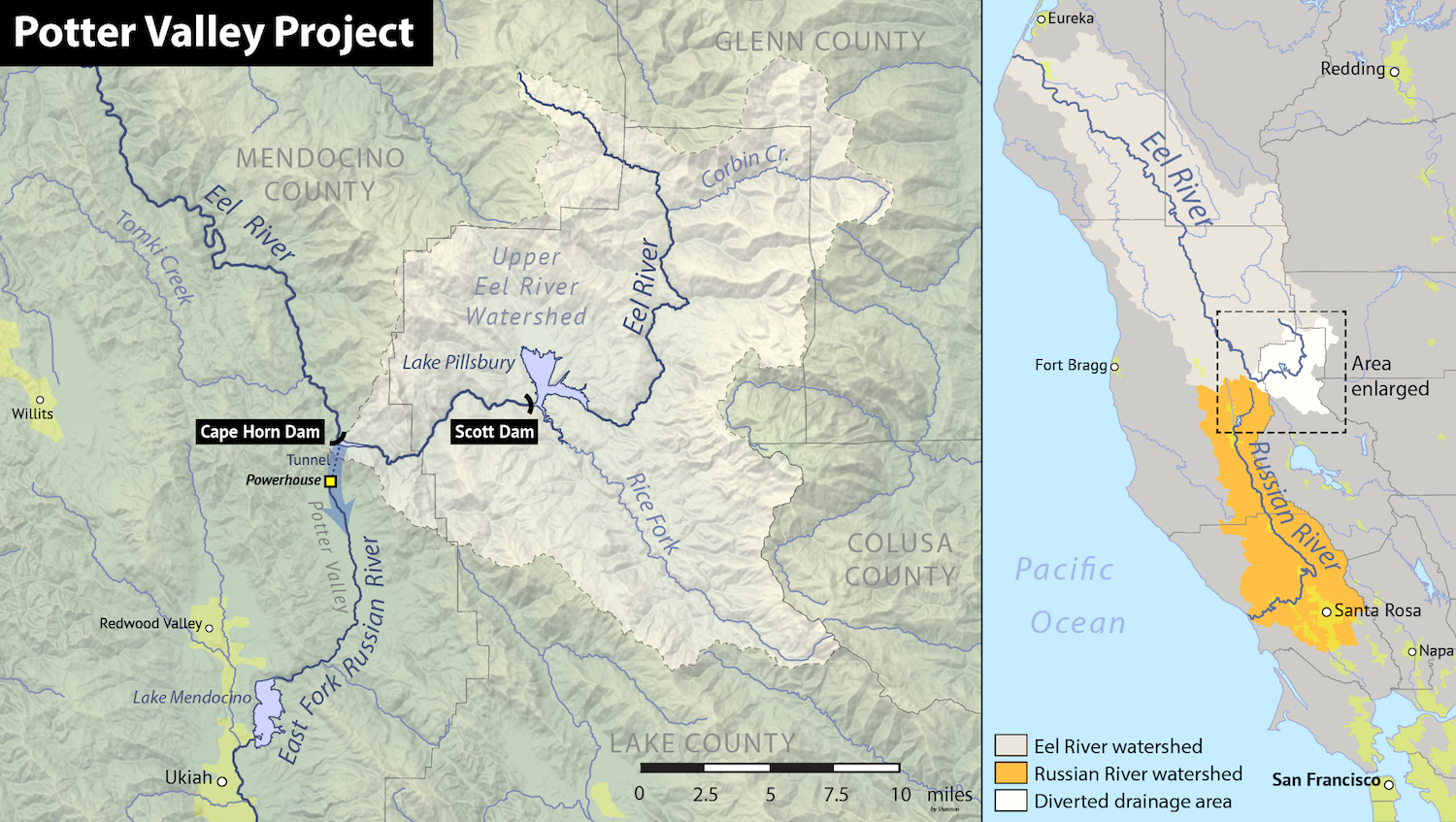
Potter Valley Project. Eel River basin to the north and Russian River basin to the south

The upper Eel River runs to the north of the ridge at the north end of Potter Valley, and in this section is 475 ft (145 m) higher than the headwaters of East Fork Russian River. The Potter Valley Project was begun in 1900 to exploit the hydroelectric potential. The concrete gravity and earth filled Cape Horn Dam was built to impound a reservoir called Lake Van Arsdale on the Eel River. A tunnel 8 ft (2.4 m) in diameter lined with redwood timbers was excavated for more than 1 mi (1.6 km) south to emerge above the northern end of Potter Valley. The water then fell through a penstock with vertical elevation of more than 450 ft (140 m) to the Potter Valley Powerhouse, which came online in April 1908 to deliver 4 MW. It was upgraded to 7 MW in 1910, a second penstock was built in 1912, and in 1917 the powerhouse was upgraded to 9.4 MW.

At first the powerhouse only ran at full capacity in the winter, and had to shut down completely in summer due to lack of water. In 1920 work started on Scott Dam, a large concrete ogee gravity structure 12 mi (19 km) upstream from Van Arsdale which collects water from the upper 7.3% of the Eel River watershed. It was completed in 1922 and began to fill Lake Pillsbury, which has a storage capacity of 74,993 acre⋅ft (92,503,000 m^{3}) and releases water for the powerhouse throughout the year. The Pacific Gas and Electric Company (PG&E) acquired the project in 1930.

The Potter Valley Project maintains minimum instream flow in the East Fork Russian River and in the Eel River. Some of the water from the generating station is used by the Potter Valley Irrigation District, while the remainder flows to Lake Mendocino. In 1969 water diversion from the Eel River into the Russian River basin ranged from 83,000 to 221,000 acre⋅ft (102,000,000 to 273,000,000 m^{3}). Spent water from the power station averaged 175,000 acre⋅ft (216,000,000 m^{3}) and allowed for more croplands in the Potter and Ukiah valleys to be irrigated, as well as allowing more urban and industrial development along the river. The power meets the needs of the city of Ukiah, and the water is valuable for agriculture, fish and recreation.

== Lake Mendocino ==
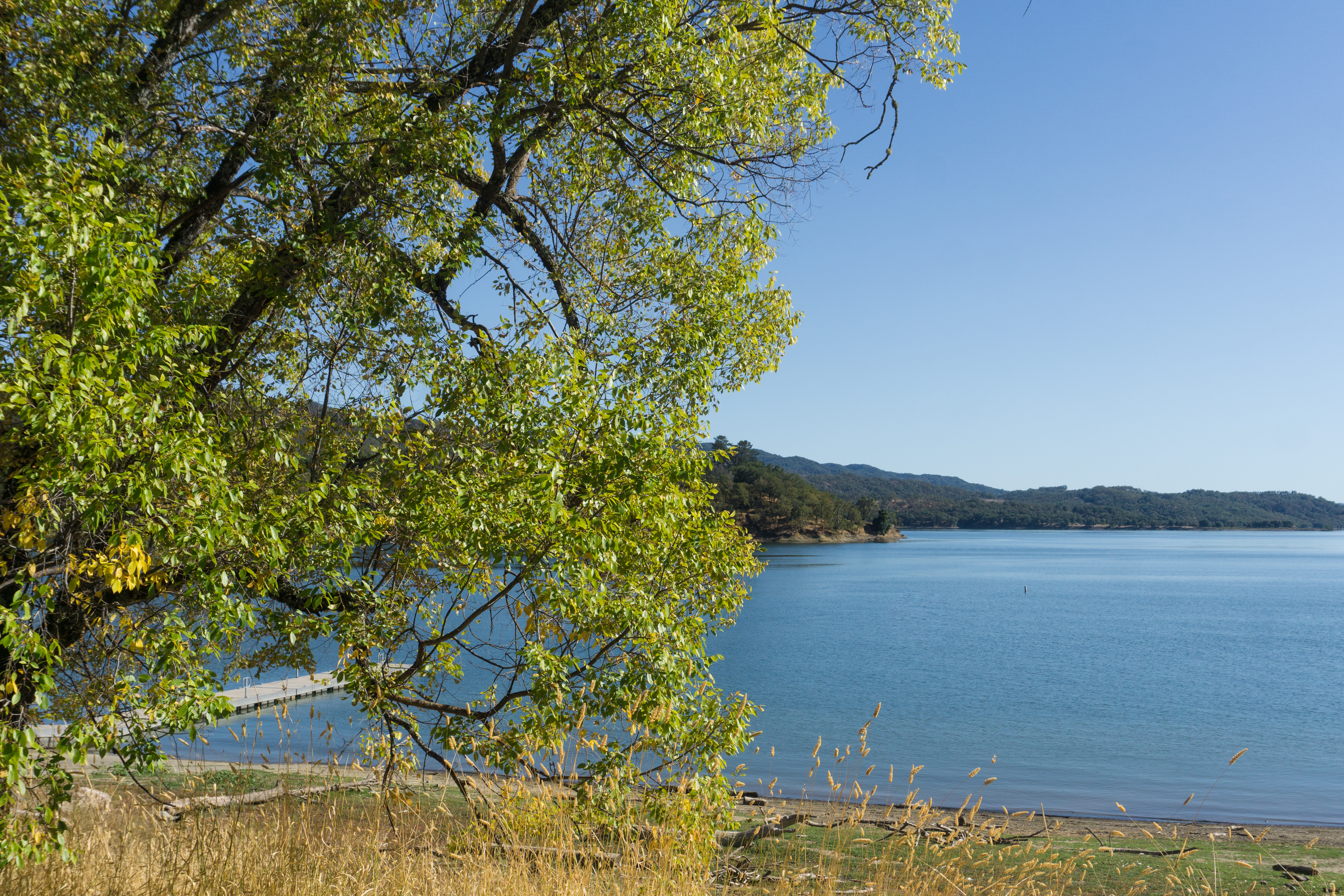
Lake Mendocino in September 2019

The East Fork Russian River is impounded near its mouth to form Lake Mendocino by the Coyote Dam, a rolled earth embankment built by the United States Army Corps of Engineers (USACE). The reservoir's catchment area is about 105 sq mi (270 km^{2}) and holds a water supply pool of 70,000 acre⋅ft (86,000,000 m^{3}). The embankment is 160 ft (49 m) high and has a crest length of 3,500 ft (1,100 m). Construction of the Coyote Dam began in July 1956. The USACE proposed to only clear a strip of land around the reservoir from the 700 to 745 ft (213 to 227 m) elevations. Residents were concerned that underwater trees, stumps and debris would be dangerous to swimmers, boaters and fishermen, and in the summer of 1958 volunteers cleared most of the basin, cutting down and burning the trees. Highway 20, which had crossed Coyote Valley, was rerouted around the new reservoir.

The dam began to store water in 1959. It serves the dual purpose of protecting against floods and supplying water. The USACE is responsible for flood control and Sonoma Water controls water release. Operations are not coordinated with the Potter Valley Project. A 3.5 MW hydroelectric power plant operated by the City of Ukiah came into operation in 1986. Lake Mendocino is used for recreational purposes such as camping, swimming, hiking, fishing, and boating. All the facilities are operated by the USACE.

A large amount of fine sediment is transported through the water diversion on Eel River, causing turbidity in Lake Mendocino during the first heavy runoff of the year and for several months afterwards. Normally sediment migrates steadily down the river. The Coyote Dam impounds bedload, and the sediment-poor water it releases erodes the bed and banks of the river downstream in the Ukiah Valley. After a major storm, flood releases from the Coyote Dam may also cause erosion of the river banks. In February 2019 torrential rains caused serious floods on the lower Russian River. In June 2021 the river's tributaries were almost dry due to a severe drought. Lake Mendocino and Lake Sonoma, further downstream, were only releasing the minimum amount of water needed for fish and wildlife to survive. Relief was not expected until the winter rains, and meanwhile fish were struggling to survive in river pools.

== Fish ==
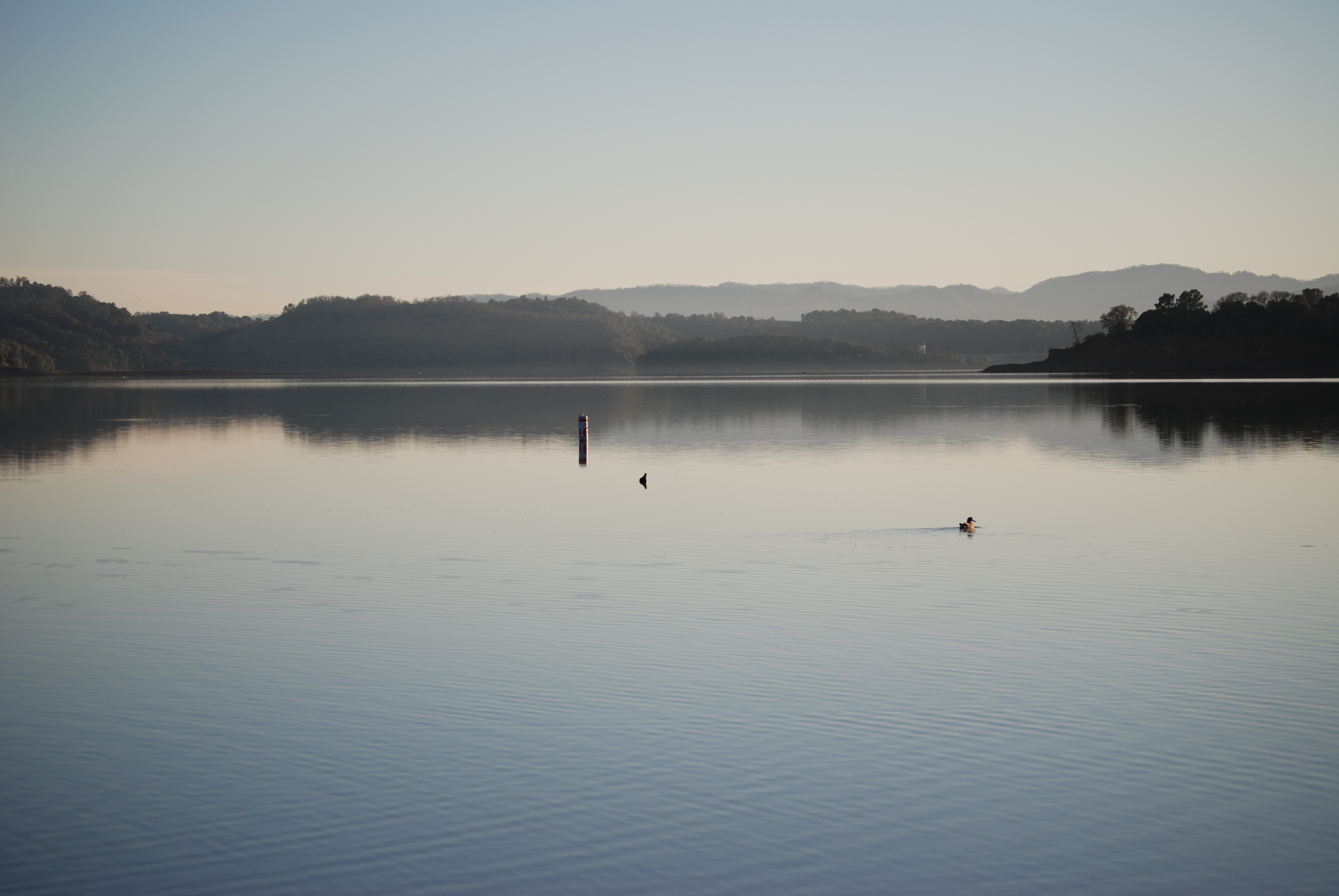
Lake Mendocino from its north shore. December 2006

The alternation of the Clear Lake drainage route in the past explains why there are many fish species common to the Russian River and the Sacramento River. Native fish species that currently inhabit, or that have historically inhabited the East Fork of the Russian River, include steelhead trout (Oncorhynchus mykiss), chinook salmon (Oncorhynchus tshawytscha), coho salmon (Oncorhynchus kisutch), rainbow trout (oncorhynchus mykiss irideus), hardhead (Mylopharodon conocephalus), Pacific lamprey (Entosphenus tridentata), Sacramento pikeminnow (Ptychocheilus grandis), Sacramento sucker (Catostomas occidentalis occidentalis) and Russian River tule perch (Hysterocarpus traskii pomo).

Numerous non-native species also inhabit the East Fork including bluegill (Lepomis macrochirus), brown bullhead (Ameiurus nebulosis), common carp (Cyprinus carpio), golden shiner (Notemigonus crysoleucas), green sunfish (Lepomis cyanellus), largemouth bass (Micropterus salmoides), redear sunfish (Lepomis microlophus), smallmouth bass (Micropterus dolomieu) and western mosquitofish (Gambusia affinis).

Before 1908 the Russian River was reduced in the summer to a series of deep pools that hosted many small fish. The constant flow of cooler water changed the summer conditions in East Fork Russian River and downstream in Russian River, degrading the spawning habitat. In 1954 the Department of Fish and Game began a program to eradicate "trash" fish in the Russian River below East Fork. The rotenone poison was sprayed into the river, which had the effect of suffocating resident fish such as squawfish, suckers, roach, carp, hardhead minnows, green sunfish and lampreys, as well as smallmouth bass, and steelhead trout. Some migratory game fish were also killed. Since 1959 the Coyote Dam has blocked steelhead trout from returning to the river, so the valley's streams are dominated by rainbow trout. The state regularly restocks the East Fork with rainbow trout.

Common species in Lake Mendocino now include largemouth bass, smallmouth bass, striped bass (Morone saxatilis), bluegill, black crappie (Pomoxis nigromaculatus), white crappie (Pomoxis annularis), channel catfish (Ictalurus punctatus), white bullhead (Ictalurus catus), brown bullhead (Ameiurus nebulosis) and a variety of non-game species. Rainbow trout stocked in the river above the lake occasionally migrate downstream for brief periods in the spring and fall, when dissolved oxygen levels in the lake are higher.

== Kayaking ==
A 2.6 mi (4.2 km) stretch of the river between Three Rocks Falls below Potter Valley down to Lake Mendocino is a class II+ run for kayakers. Its gradient is about 20 ft/mi (3.8 m/km) and flow is about 300–600 cu ft/s (8.5–17.0 m^{3}/s). Flow is good all year round due to controlled release from the upstream reservoirs, but best in the autumn. The Three Rock Falls itself is a class V–VI rapid where several inner tubers have died, and should be avoided by most kayakers in most water conditions.

== Sources ==
- Callahan, Mary (25 June 2021), "Russian River on the brink: Lifeblood of North Coast imperiled by deepening drought", The Press Democrat
- Chocholak, Dianne (15 June 1992), Early conditions and history of the upper Russian River (PDF), Mendocino County Water Agency
- Cook, David G.; Chase, Shawn D.; Manning, David J. (2010), "Distribution and Ecology of the Russian River Tule Perch", California Fish and Game, 96 (2): 146–164
- Draft Lake Mendocino Master Plan (PDF), Mendocino County, California and U.S. Army Corps of Engineers, San Francisco District, 2019 This article incorporates text from this source, which is in the public domain.
- "East Fork Russian River", California Water Indicators Portal
- "East Fork Russian River", Geographic Names Information System, United States Geological Survey, United States Department of the Interior
- Hodges, Randy (1998), "Russian River East Fork", California Creeks
- Kaplan, Victoria D. (February 1979), An Interpretive History of Coyote Dam, Mendocino County, California (PDF), US Army Corps of Engineers
- Kondolf, Dr. Matt (2020), Overview and History of the Russian River Watershed (PDF), Russian River Independent Science Review Panel
- Lundquist, Erica (February 2010), Scotts Creek Watershed Assessment (PDF), Scotts Creek Watershed Council, archived from the original (PDF) on 2021-05-11
- Lundquist, Erica (February 2010b), Middle Creek Watershed Assessment (PDF), Middle Creek Coordinated Resource Management and Planning Group, archived from the original (PDF) on 2021-05-17
- Lynch, Bill (25 April 2019), "Meandering Angler: State trout season opens Saturday, April 17", Sonoma Index-Tribune
- Martinez, Jody (13 January 2018), "Mendocino County history: Remembering floods near Ukiah", The Ukiah Daily Journal
- McKee Parkway, County of Mendocino
- "Potter Valley", Fish Friendly Farming
- The Potter Valley Project, Potter Valley Irrigation District
- Water-Data Report 2011 – 11462000 East Fork Russian River near Ukiah, CA (PDF), USGS
- Water Supply, Sonoma Water
- Watson, E.B.; Pendleton, R.L. (1919), "Soil Survey of the Ukiah Area, California", Field Operations of the Bureau of Soils, vol. 16, United States Bureau of Soils, p. 2636 (Soil Survey of the Ukiah Area, California at the Internet Archive)
