= Lake Van Arsdale =

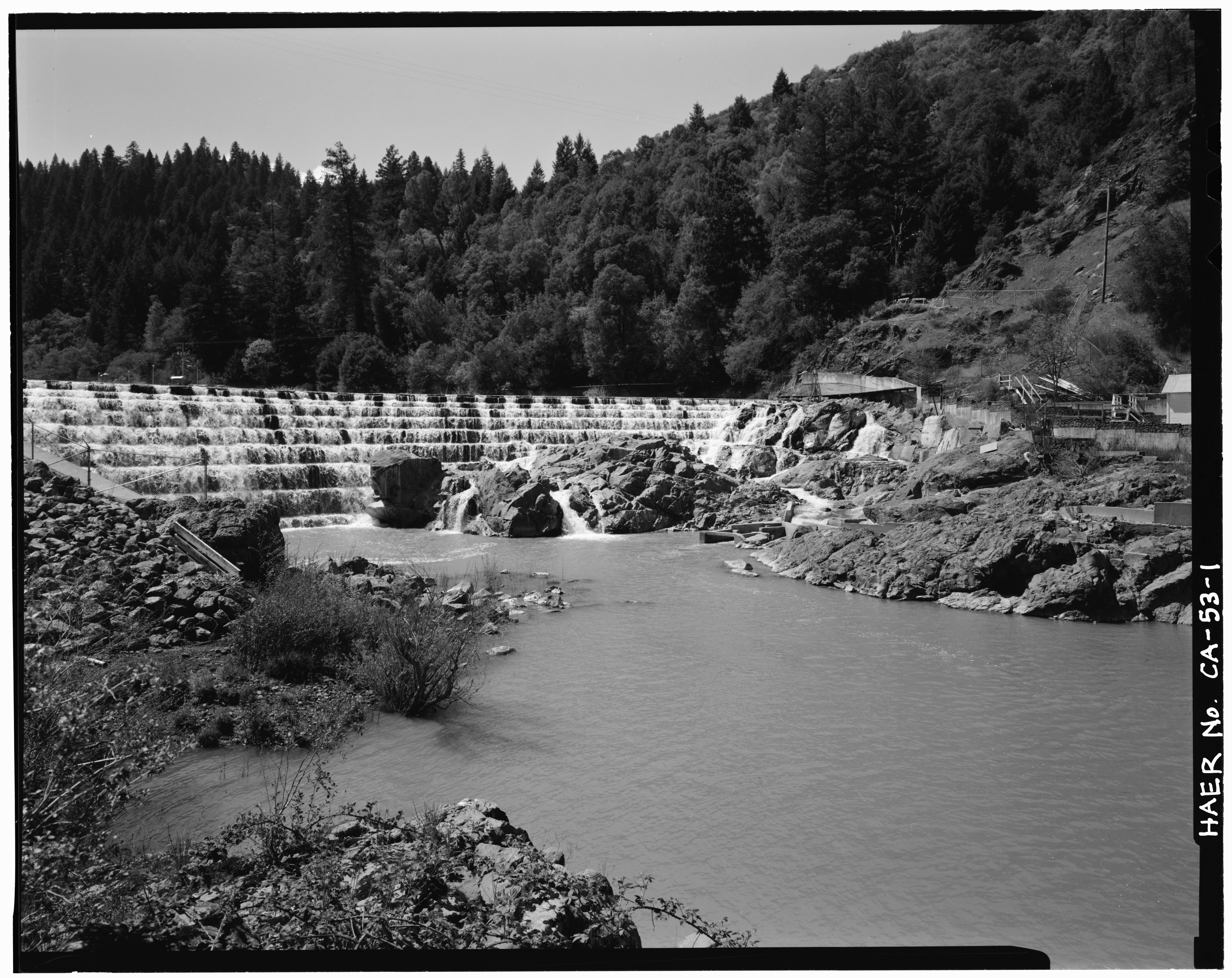

- Location within California Location within the United States
- Location: Mendocino County, California
- Coordinates: 39°23′9″N 123°7′2″W
- Type: Reservoir
- Primary inflows: Eel River, Mill Creek, Rocky Creek, Trout Creek
- Primary outflows: Eel River, Powerhouse Canal
- Catchment area: 345 sq mi (890 km^{2})
- Basin countries: United States
- Max. width: 400 ft (120 m)
- Surface area: 163 acres (66 ha)
- Water volume: 700 acre-feet (860,000 m^{3})
- Surface elevation: 1,493 feet (455 m)

Lake Van Arsdale, also known as Van Arsdale Reservoir, is a reservoir on the Eel River in California, part of the Potter Valley Project. Located in Mendocino County, 4 miles (6.4 km) north of the town of Potter Valley, California, the reservoir supplies water to users as far south as Marin County.

The reservoir is formed by the Cape Horn Dam, also known as Van Arsdale Dam, which impounds the waters of the Eel River. A portion of its water (154,000 acre-feet (190,000,000 m^{3}) per year, on average) is diverted southward through an aqueduct tunnel to a powerhouse in Potter Valley, where it drives a turbine capable of generating up to 9.4 MW of electric power. Diverted water then descends by means of the Powerhouse Canal and East Fork Russian River to Lake Mendocino, which supplies the Sonoma County Water Agency. The non-diverted flow continues down the Eel to its mouth at the Pacific Ocean near Fortuna.

== History ==
In 1905, the Snow Mountain Water and Power Company started building the Potter Valley Project. Cape Horn Dam was completed in 1907 (119 years ago), and the original project became operational in 1908. Pacific Gas and Electric Company took over the project in 1930 and owns most of the lake bed.

== Cape Horn Dam ==
Cape Horn Dam is an earth fill and concrete gravity dam 63 feet (19 m) high, 515 feet (157 m) long, and 10 feet (3.0 m) thick, containing 40,000 cubic yards (31,000 m^{3}) of material. Its crest is 1,519 feet (463 m) above sea level.

== See also ==
- Lake Pillsbury
- List of reservoirs and dams in California
- List of lakes in California
