= Ukiah Ambulance =

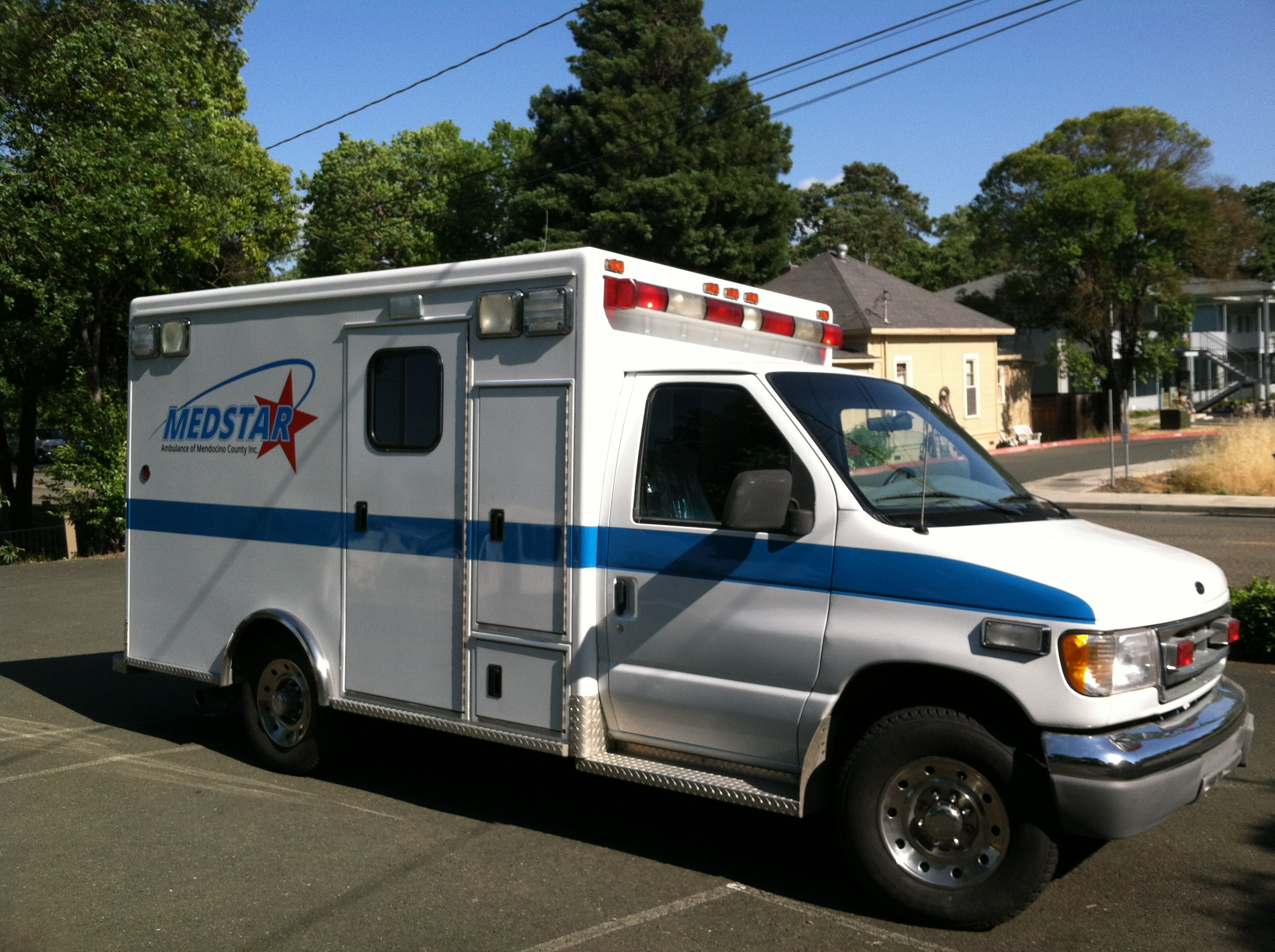
Paramedic Ambulance

Ukiah Ambulance is now Medstar Ambulance of Mendocino County Inc., a private non-profit ground transport ambulance provider serving central and southern Mendocino County. It is the longest continuously running ambulance service in Mendocino County history. Ukiah Ambulance also developed the first air rescue service in Mendocino County, called FlightCare, which operated for ten years out of the Ukiah Municipal Airport.

== Ground operations ==
The company provides Advanced Life Support (ALS) emergency ambulance service to the City of Ukiah and greater Ukiah Valley, Redwood Valley, Potter Valley, Hopland and surrounding areas. Medstar/Ukiah Ambulance also provides backup assistance to Round Valley (Covelo) and Anderson Valley (Boonville), which both provide Basic Life Support (BLS) ambulance services.

Emergency ambulances are staffed with two personnel (one EMT and one Paramedic) and are equipped with:

- Zoll E-series cardiac monitor/defibrillator
- Intravenous line pump
- Pediatric resuscitation kit
- Continuous Positive Airway Pressure (CPAP)
- Airway management equipment (oral intubation, needle cricothyrotomy, needle thoracentesis)
- GPS mapping and routing

== Medical operations ==
Medstar/Ukiah Ambulance operates under the regulation of the Coastal Valleys EMS Agency (CVEMSA), which is the local emergency medical services agency (LEMSA) for Sonoma County and contract LEMSA for Mendocino County.

There are three designated receiving hospitals in Mendocino County: Ukiah Valley Medical Center, a Level IV Trauma Center (Ukiah); Frank R. Howard Memorial Hospital (City of Willits); and Mendocino Coast District Hospital (Fort Bragg). Due to its remote nature, Mendocino County also sees heavy use of EMS aircraft, particularly for transport to Level III or Level II Trauma Centers, as well as STEMI and Stroke Centers. California Shock Trauma Air Rescue (CALSTAR) and REACH are the primary providers of air medical transportation within Mendocino County.

In addition to providing ambulance transportation, Medstar/Ukiah Ambulance coordinates with the Mendocino County Sheriffs Office to provide tactical paramedics. Specially trained paramedics assigned to law enforcement duties are available to provide ALS care in the “hot zone” during high risk SWAT operations. This mission-critical operation facilitates rapid aid to a downed officer or wounded suspect. The formal program was developed, in part, due to extensive efforts in the search for murder suspect Aaron Bassler in 2011.
