= Potter Valley Project =

Northern California dam water transfer system

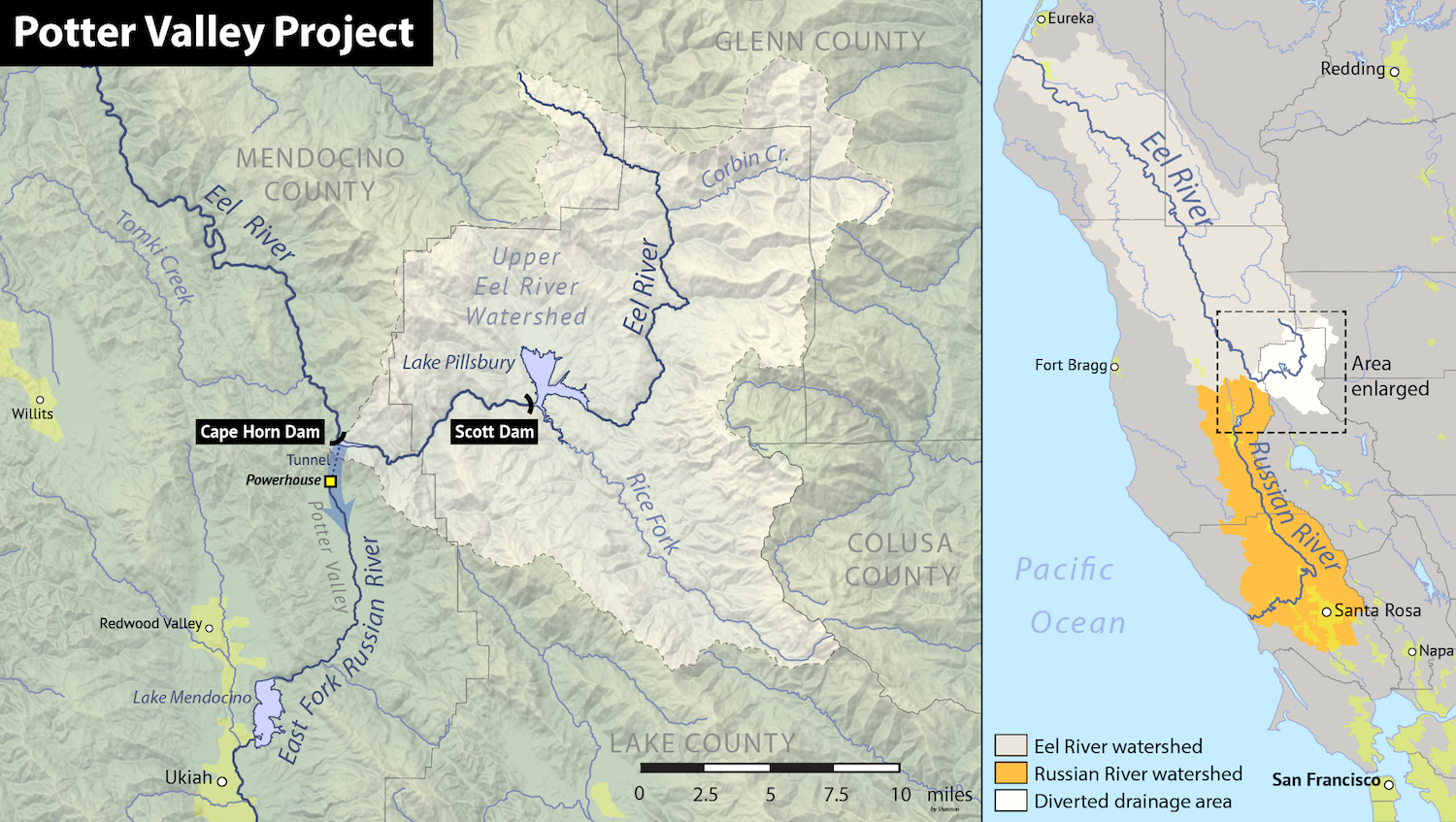
Map of the Potter Valley Project

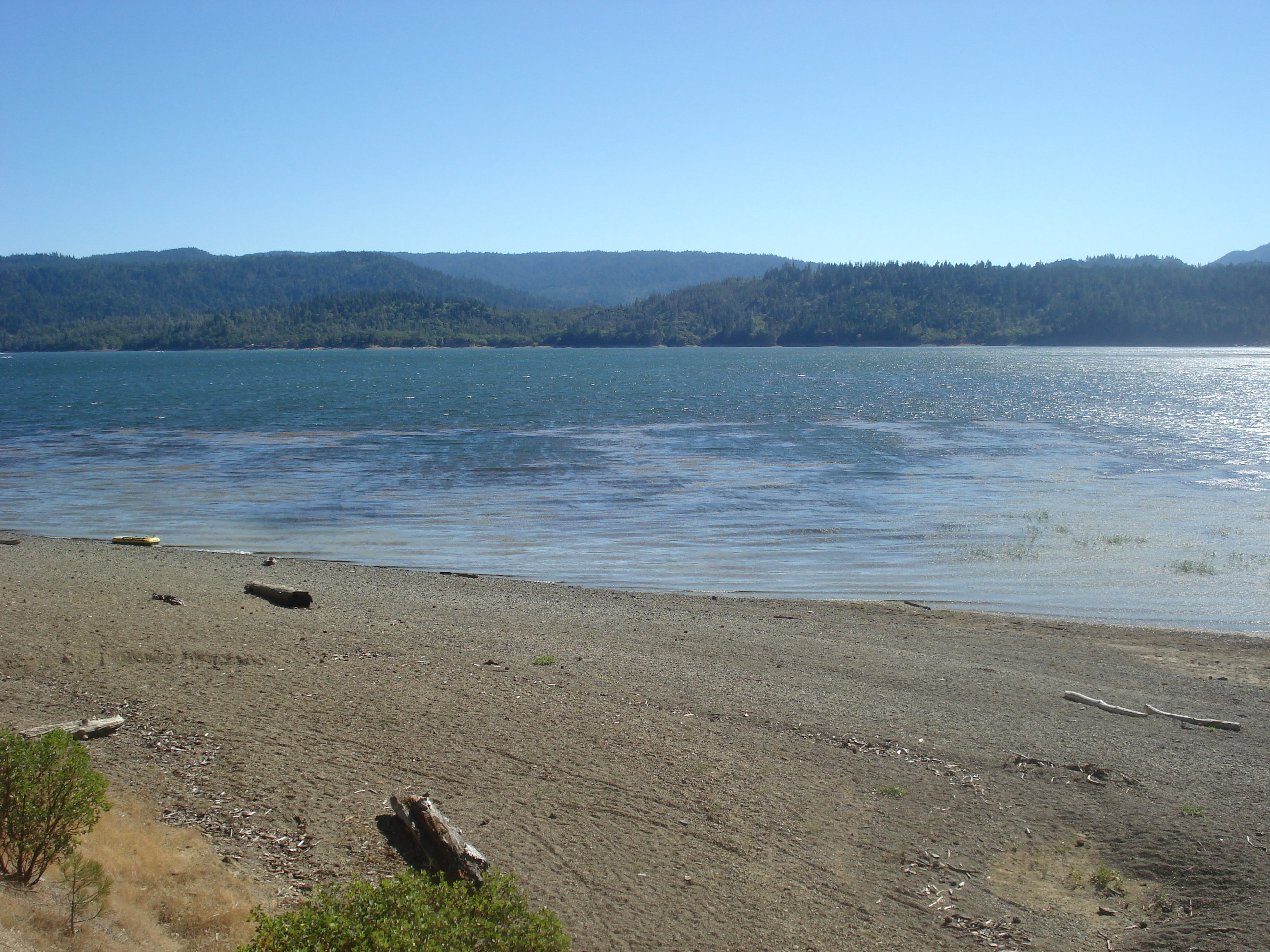
Lake Pillsbury, the project's primary reservoir

The Potter Valley Project is an interbasin water transfer project in Northern California in the United States, delivering water from the Eel River basin to turbines in the headwaters of the Russian River. The project is owned and operated by Pacific Gas and Electric Company (PG&E). The main facilities are two dams on the Eel River, a diversion tunnel and hydroelectric plant. Average annual throughput is 159,000 acre⋅ft (196,000,000 m^{3}), although this figure varies significantly with both the amount of precipitation in the Eel River basin and the demand on the Russian River.

In 2019, PG&E chose not to relicense the hydroelectric project with the Federal Energy Regulatory Commission, as it had become unprofitable to operate. The dams and hydroelectric facilities are to be removed, while various options are being considered for maintaining water diversions to the Russian River.

== History ==
Construction on the project began in 1900, when The Eel River Power and Irrigation Company (later the Snow Mountain Water and Power Company) constructed the Cape Horn Dam and a one-mile (1.6 km), 8-foot (2.4 m)-diameter tunnel under the drainage divide to Potter Valley, at the headwaters of the East Fork Russian River. The water dropped 450 feet (140 m) to a powerhouse before being released to the East Fork Russian River. On April 1, 1908, the first deliveries were made and power production began with a capacity of 4000 kilowatts (KW). In 1910, the generation capacity was boosted to 7000 KW and in 1912 second penstock was built to increase the flow capacity of the tunnel. The powerhouse was upgraded to 9400 KW in 1917, after the addition of a fourth unit.

Initially, the project could only operate during the winter months, when there was enough water in the Eel River to divert without drying up the riverbed downstream. In 1920, Snow Mountain Water and Power began construction on a larger dam on the Eel River, 12 miles (19 km) upstream from Cape Horn. Scott Dam, which forms Lake Pillsbury, was completed in 1922. With its greater storage capacity, it provided water for the diversion during the summer months and also afforded some flood control during winter storms. In 1930, ownership of the project was transferred to PG&E. In 1959, Coyote Valley Dam was built on the Russian River as part of the separate Russian River Basin Project (RRBP), forming Lake Mendocino, which provides additional storage of diverted Eel River waters. This reservoir serves a critical function during dry years as it is drawn down to compensate for reduced diversions from the Eel River system.

The Federal Energy Regulatory Commission relicensing of the project on January 28, 2004, placed limits on the amount of water that can be diverted. In combination with drought conditions, diversions between 2004 and 2009 averaged 90,000 acre-feet (110,000,000 m^{3}), or 57% of the historical average. Since then, late summer water has been released from Cape Horn Dam at rates roughly mimicking or exceeding natural flows in an attempt to mitigate the impacts to fisheries.

In 2019, PG&E chose not to relicense the hydroelectric project with the Federal Energy Regulatory Commission, as it had become unprofitable to operate. Federal regulations required PG&E to submit a final license surrender application by 2025, which enabled it to begin decommissioning the project. The dams and hydroelectric facilities are to be removed, while various options were considered for maintaining water diversions to the Russian River. The New Eel-Russian Diversion Facility proposed a seasonal approach that would only operate only when the Eel River has sufficient water. This new, smaller diversion structure would be added to Lake Van Arsdal.

== Operations ==
The project derives water from a drainage basin of 289 square miles (750 km^{2}) above Scott Dam and approximately 50 square miles (130 km^{2}) between Scott Dam and Cape Horn Dam, where water is diverted to the Russian River. The vast majority of the water arrives as winter rain between December and April, with a smaller, less reliable amount furnished by snowmelt and groundwater through June. Scott Dam, which forms Lake Pillsbury, has a total storage capacity of 74,993 acre-feet (92,503,000 m^{3}). Project regulations require that the gates at Scott Dam be opened between October 16 and April 1, for safety reasons during the winter months. Winter storms fill the reservoir, which provides only very limited flood control, because the average annual runoff of 400,000 acre-feet (490,000,000 m^{3}) is over five times the project storage capacity. It is not uncommon for the dams to spill eight or nine times during a single winter season. After the wet season passes, Lake Pillsbury is drawn down beginning April 1. Typical summer drawdowns leave the reservoir at or above 20,000 acre-feet (25,000,000 m^{3}), or 27 percent capacity. Water is released to Cape Horn Dam, which diverts the majority, while releasing a small flow to the Eel River designed to mimic natural summer flows. This is typically around 20 cubic feet per second (0.57 m^{3}/s), but can decrease significantly during dry years.

== Beneficiaries ==
In 1924, the Potter Valley Irrigation District (PVID) was formed to provide irrigation water to the farmers along the East Branch Russian River. The district currently serves 390 farmers with rights to 22,670 acre-feet (27,960,000 m^{3}) of project water per year, for the irrigation of 4,905 acres (1,985 ha) within a district boundary of 6,900 acres (2,800 ha). Because there is very little natural runoff in Potter Valley and the local geology is non-conducive to groundwater storage, the PVID is the only constituent that depends solely on Eel River water.

Project water also serves farmers and municipalities downstream along the Russian River, in Mendocino County. The total water use per year is about 17,000 to 23,000 acre-feet (21,000,000 to 28,000,000 m^{3}). Even further downstream, water users in Sonoma County use between 50,000 and 80,000 acre-feet (62,000,000 and 99,000,000 m^{3}) per year. These users depend both on Potter Valley Project water and natural flows in the Russian River basin managed by the RRBP. In addition to agricultural, domestic and industrial uses, project water helps to maintain a minimum dry season flow of 150 cubic feet per second (4.2 m^{3}/s) in the Russian River, serving for recreational, aesthetic and fishery enhancement purposes. Project water is estimated to provide at least part of the water supply for nearly 500,000 people living in Sonoma and Mendocino Counties, mainly in the North Bay area, for cities such as Santa Rosa.

== Environmental impact ==
The Potter Valley Project has had a significant impact on summer low streamflows in the Eel River basin. Although the project taps water from only the upper 10% of the Eel River system, this headwaters region provides most of the summer flow in the lower Eel, especially during critically dry years, when only 5 cubic feet per second (0.14 m^{3}/s) are allowed into the Eel River past the Cape Horn diversion point. As a result, summer-run salmon and steelhead in the Eel River are negatively affected during dry years. In addition, while Cape Horn Dam has a fish ladder, the larger Scott Dam blocks fish migration to about 100 miles (160 km) of habitat in the Eel River headwaters.

== See also ==
- Water in California
