= Potter Valley, California =

Potter Valley baloʔxa:y (Northern Pomo)
- Census-designated place
- Location within California Location within the United States
- Coordinates: 39°19′20″N 123°06′47″W
- Country: United States
- State: California
- County: Mendocino

Area
  - Total: 4.055 sq mi (10.50 km^{2})
  - Land: 4.027 sq mi (10.43 km^{2})
  - Water: 0.028 sq mi (0.073 km^{2}) 0.69%
- Elevation: 948 ft (289 m)

Population (2020)
  - Total: 665
  - Density: 165/sq mi (63.8/km^{2})
- Time zone: UTC−8 (Pacific)
  - Summer (DST): UTC−7 (PDT)
- ZIP code: 95469
- Area code: 707
- FIPS code: 06-58506
- GNIS feature IDs: 265005; 2628779

Potter Valley is a census-designated place in Mendocino County, California, United States. It is located 18 miles (29 km) north-northeast of Ukiah, at an elevation of 948 feet (289 m) at the headwaters of the East Fork Russian River. The CDP population was 665 at the 2020 census.

== History ==
In 1852, when William and Thomas Potter and Mose Briggs first entered what would become known as Potter Valley, they were searching for the headwaters of the Russian River from their base in Sonoma County. The Pomo people called it baloʔxa:y. They found three Pomo villages (each about 500 people strong), the Russian headwaters, and a lush valley with wild oats "stirrup high". Eventually the Potters returned to settle there, and the valley became known by the American ranchers' name.

The post office opened in 1870.

Painter Grace Hudson was born in Potter Valley in 1865.

In addition to his famous Ridgewood Ranch, Charles S. Howard, owner of the racehorse Seabiscuit, owned a ranch in Potter Valley where he ran cattle.

== Geography ==
Potter Valley is located 18 miles (29 km) northeast of Ukiah and 8 miles (13 km) northeast of Lake Mendocino in Mendocino County, with the valley floor at roughly 950 feet (290 m) in elevation. The headwaters of the East Fork of the Russian River originate in the valley. The Potter Valley Project delivers additional water from the Eel River, which flows into the Russian River here via a controversial hydroelectric plant that tunnels through the mountains to take advantage of the relative proximity of these two waterways. This diversion supplies a significant amount of water to inland Mendocino and Sonoma counties. Potter Valley is a rich agricultural region, with excellent soils, planted mostly in irrigated pasture, wine grapes, and pears, but supporting a wide variety of farms and ranches.

According to the United States Census Bureau, the Potter Valley Census Designated Place (CDP) covers an area of 4.0 square miles (10 km^{2}), of which 99.31% is land, and 0.69% is water. The entire valley, which is mostly rural, has an area of roughly 12 square miles (31 km^{2}).

== Climate ==
Potter Valley has a hot-summer Mediterranean climate (Csa) typical of the interior of Northern California, with hot, dry summers and cool, wet winters, along with great diurnal temperature variation.

Climate data for Potter Valley Powerhouse, California (1991–2020 normals, extremes 1937–present)
Month	Jan	Feb	Mar	Apr	May	Jun	Jul	Aug	Sep	Oct	Nov	Dec	Year
Record high °F (°C)	82 (28)	87 (31)	90 (32)	95 (35)	103 (39)	110 (43)	113 (45)	116 (47)	113 (45)	103 (39)	93 (34)	83 (28)	116 (47)
Mean maximum °F (°C)	67.9 (19.9)	73.3 (22.9)	80.5 (26.9)	86.5 (30.3)	93.1 (33.9)	100.8 (38.2)	103.9 (39.9)	102.9 (39.4)	101.1 (38.4)	91.6 (33.1)	77.7 (25.4)	65.8 (18.8)	105.9 (41.1)
Mean daily maximum °F (°C)	57.4 (14.1)	61.4 (16.3)	66.0 (18.9)	70.7 (21.5)	78.9 (26.1)	87.0 (30.6)	95.0 (35.0)	94.1 (34.5)	90.3 (32.4)	78.9 (26.1)	64.3 (17.9)	56.0 (13.3)	75.0 (23.9)
Daily mean °F (°C)	46.1 (7.8)	48.9 (9.4)	52.4 (11.3)	55.8 (13.2)	62.0 (16.7)	68.4 (20.2)	74.7 (23.7)	73.4 (23.0)	69.5 (20.8)	61.1 (16.2)	51.2 (10.7)	45.3 (7.4)	59.1 (15.1)
Mean daily minimum °F (°C)	34.9 (1.6)	36.4 (2.4)	38.9 (3.8)	40.8 (4.9)	45.1 (7.3)	49.9 (9.9)	54.4 (12.4)	52.7 (11.5)	48.7 (9.3)	43.3 (6.3)	38.2 (3.4)	34.5 (1.4)	43.2 (6.2)
Mean minimum °F (°C)	24.0 (−4.4)	25.8 (−3.4)	28.7 (−1.8)	31.2 (−0.4)	36.0 (2.2)	40.7 (4.8)	47.2 (8.4)	45.9 (7.7)	40.5 (4.7)	33.6 (0.9)	25.9 (−3.4)	22.8 (−5.1)	20.9 (−6.2)
Record low °F (°C)	14 (−10)	15 (−9)	20 (−7)	22 (−6)	28 (−2)	32 (0)	38 (3)	39 (4)	33 (1)	21 (−6)	19 (−7)	12 (−11)	12 (−11)
Average precipitation inches (mm)	8.21 (209)	7.72 (196)	6.28 (160)	3.36 (85)	1.86 (47)	0.54 (14)	0.04 (1.0)	0.05 (1.3)	0.30 (7.6)	1.86 (47)	5.04 (128)	9.77 (248)	45.03 (1,143.9)
Average precipitation days (≥ 0.01 in)	15.7	14.0	13.4	9.0	5.9	1.9	0.3	0.5	1.2	5.2	12.3	16.1	95.5
Source: NOAA

== Demographics ==
Historical population
Census	Pop.	Note	%±
2010	646		—
2020	665		2.9%
U.S. Decennial Census; 2010

Potter Valley first appeared as a census designated place in the 2010 U.S. census.

The 2020 United States census reported that Potter Valley had a population of 665. The population density was 165.1 inhabitants per square mile (63.7/km^{2}). The racial makeup of Potter Valley was 484 (72.8%) White, 0 (0.0%) African American, 12 (1.8%) Native American, 1 (0.2%) Asian, 0 (0.0%) Pacific Islander, 67 (10.1%) from other races, and 101 (15.2%) from two or more races. Hispanic or Latino of any race were 146 persons (22.0%).

The whole population lived in households. There were 255 households, out of which 71 (27.8%) had children under the age of 18 living in them, 121 (47.5%) were married-couple households, 18 (7.1%) were cohabiting couple households, 61 (23.9%) had a female householder with no partner present, and 55 (21.6%) had a male householder with no partner present. 77 households (30.2%) were one person, and 50 (19.6%) were one person aged 65 or older. The average household size was 2.61. There were 158 families (62.0% of all households).

The age distribution was 176 people (26.5%) under the age of 18, 31 people (4.7%) aged 18 to 24, 165 people (24.8%) aged 25 to 44, 148 people (22.3%) aged 45 to 64, and 145 people (21.8%) who were 65 years of age or older. The median age was 38.3 years. For every 100 females, there were 112.5 males.

There were 279 housing units at an average density of 69.3 units per square mile (26.8 units/km^{2}), of which 255 (91.4%) were occupied. Of these, 186 (72.9%) were owner-occupied, and 69 (27.1%) were occupied by renters.

== Politics ==
In the state legislature, Potter Valley is in the 2nd senatorial district, represented by Democrat Mike McGuire, and the 2nd Assembly district, represented by Democrat Chris Rogers.

Federally, Potter Valley is in California's 2nd congressional district, represented by Democrat Jared Huffman.
