= Lake Mendocino =

Man-made lake in California, United States

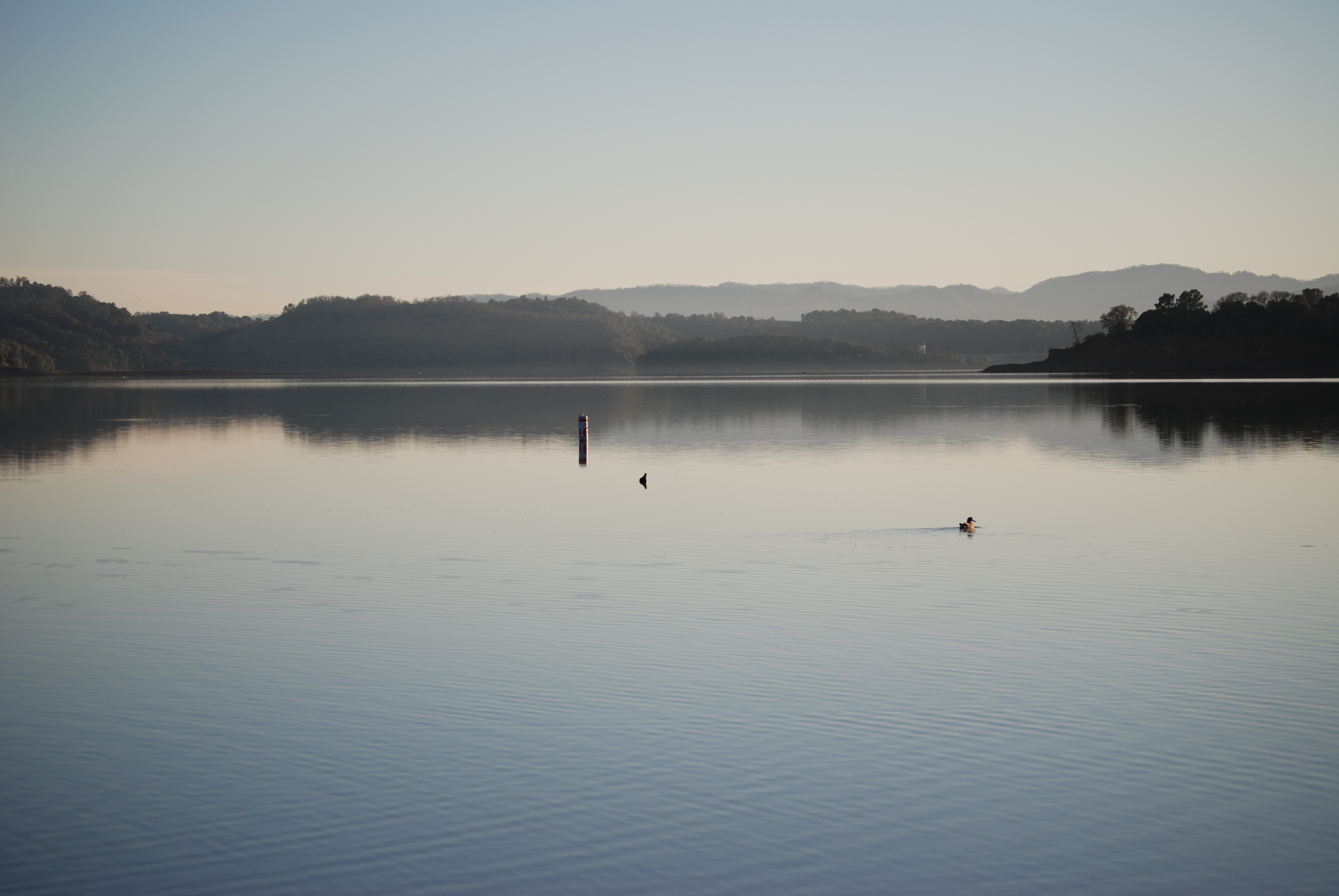
- Lake Mendocino from its northern shore

- Location within California Location within the United States
- Location: Mendocino County, California
- Coordinates: 39°12′N 123°11′W
- Type: reservoir
- Primary inflows: East Fork Russian River
- Primary outflows: East Fork Russian River
- Catchment area: 105 sq mi (270 km^{2})
- Basin countries: United States
- Surface area: 1,922 acres (7.78 km^{2})
- Max. depth: 133 ft (41 m)
- Water volume: 122,400 acre⋅ft (0.1510 km^{3})
- Surface elevation: 737.5 ft (224.8 m)

Lake Mendocino is a large reservoir in Mendocino County, California, northeast of Ukiah. It covers 1,922 acres (7.78 km^{2}) and was formed by the construction of Coyote Valley Dam in 1957 (69 years ago). The lake and dam provide flood control, water conservation, hydroelectric power, and recreation. The dam also includes a fallout shelter built during the Cold War era to protect against the radiation from nuclear attacks from the Soviet Union. The reservoir's water is used by approximately 600,000 people.

== Recreation ==
Lake Mendocino is administered by the U.S. Army Corps of Engineers and offers disc golf, boating, water skiing, fishing, camping, and hiking.

There are 300+ campsites plus a small number of boat-in only sites. Three groups of campsites are named in the Pomo language of the local native people.

There are two boat ramps, at the north and south ends of the lake, and use for watersports is permitted. The lake also has numerous day use and picnic areas. Several hiking trails traverse the length of the lake.

The California Office of Environmental Health Hazard Assessment (OEHHA) has developed a safe eating advisory for Lake Mendocino based on levels of mercury found in fish caught from this water body.

== Coyote Dam ==
Coyote Dam (or Coyote Valley Dam) is an earthen dam 160 ft (49 m) high and 3,560 ft (1,085 m) long.It was built as a flood control project by the U.S. Army Corps of Engineers. Completed in 1957, it sits across the East Fork Russian River, which is the primary source of inflow to the lake. With the construction of the dam, the Army Corps had to relocate the residents of the Coyote Valley, along with a short portion of State Route 20. The dam offers public access by foot. The purpose of the dam was to prevent flooding in the Ukiah valley, and provide a water supply for Sonoma county. During the Cold War it served as a fallout shelter in the case of a nuclear attack, which remains today at the dam with a radioactive symbol. The Mendocino Hydro Plant was built by the City of Ukiah in 1986 and is controlled remotely by the Northern California Power Agency.

== See also ==
- Lake Sonoma
- List of dams and reservoirs in California
- List of lakes in California
