= Lake Pillsbury =

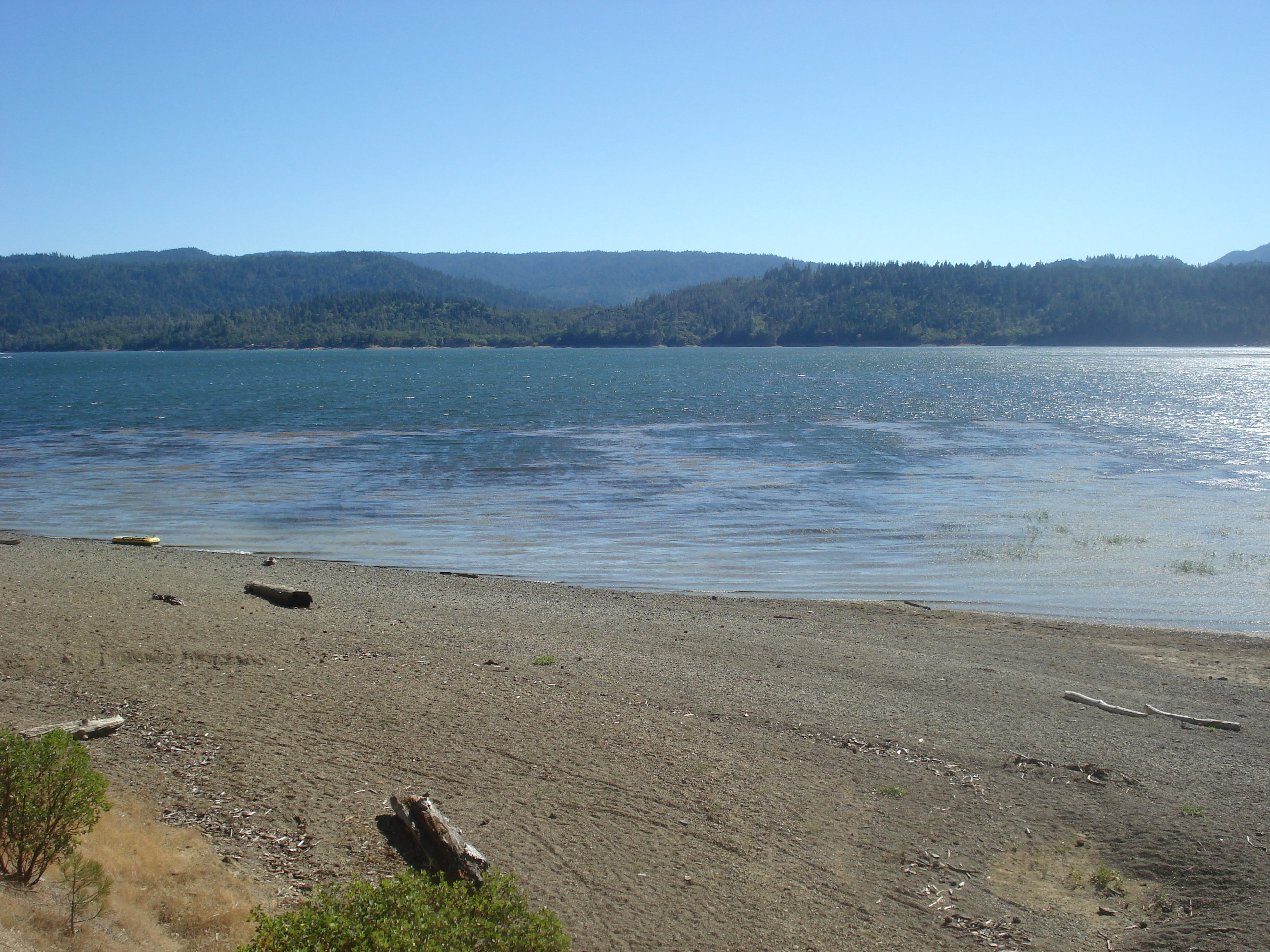

- Location within California
- Location: Mendocino National Forest; Lake County, California
- Coordinates: 39.4072°N 122.9575°W
- Type: Reservoir
- Primary inflows: Eel River
- Primary outflows: Eel River
- Catchment area: 289 sq mi (750 km^{2})
- Basin countries: United States
- Surface area: 2,000 acres (810 ha)
- Water volume: 80,500 acre⋅ft (99,300,000 m^{3})
- Shore length^{1}: 65 mi (105 km)
- Surface elevation: 1,818 ft (554 m)
- References: U.S. Geological Survey Geographic Names Information System: Lake Pillsbury
- ^{1} Shore length is not a well-defined measure.

Lake Pillsbury is a reservoir in the Mendocino National Forest of Lake County, California, created from the Eel River and Hull Mountain watershed by Scott Dam. Elevation is 1,818 ft (554 m) with 65 mi (105 km) of shoreline and covering 2,003 acres (811 ha). Activities in the Lake Pillsbury Recreation Area include powerboating, fishing, swimming, sailing, picnicking, hiking and hanggliding. There are two main access roads to the lake. At the north end of the lake is a small gravel airstrip. About 300 vacation cabins including National Forest Recreational Residences (private cabin leases of public lands) ring the lake.

== History ==
In 1906, W.W. Van Arsdale formed the Eel River Power and Irrigation Company and contracted with the city of Ukiah for a hydroelectric generating station to increase electricity supply for the city. A diversion dam was built on the Eel River and a mile-long tunnel was constructed to divert water into the Russian River. A powerhouse was constructed in Potter Valley. It was called the Potter Valley Project or Eel River Project.

Later that year, the Snow Mountain Water and Power Company incorporated and took over the project from Van Arsdale's company. By 1908 water was being diverted to the power plant and then to the Russian River. Part two of the project was building the dam which created Lake Pillsbury, located 12 miles (19 km) upstream.

Scott Dam was completed in 1921 as a concrete gravity structure, 138 feet (42 m) high, 805 feet (245 m) long at its crest, and impounding a maximum capacity of 86,400 acre-feet (106,600,000 m^{3}). It maintains water flow to the hydroelectric plant during times of low water runoff. Pacific Gas and Electric Company (PG&E) acquired the project in 1933. The lake is named for one of the founders of Snow Mountain Water and Power Company. The Pillsbury hydroelectric plant was the only one in the north coast region of California operated by PG&E.

In 1969, performers Jack Haley and Jackie Gleason purchased the Fuller Ranch and created the Pillsbury Ranch subdivision.

In 2019, PG&E notified the Federal Energy Regulatory Commission (FERC) they would not seek to re-license the Potter Valley project noting the project was no longer economically viable. As part of PG&E's divestment of the Potter Valley Hydropower Project, PG&E was required to submit a decommissioning plan to FERC. The project's license expired in April 2022, but the agency authorized continued operations until a final decision.

PG&E stated that their plan for decommissioning the Project "will include the removal of in water facilities such that no feature will continue to impound water and the natural flow of the river will occur." If this plan is approved, it would restore the Eel River to a free flowing state making it the longest un-dammed river in California.

== Recreation ==
There are five campgrounds, two group campgrounds, two paved boat ramps and a resort at the lake. The Lake Pillsbury Resort operates a marina with rentals, boat slips and supplies. All types of boating are allowed, including boat camping.

California Department of Fish and Game stock the lake with trout annually. Other fish include black bass, steelhead, and pikeminnow.

The California Office of Environmental Health Hazard Assessment (OEHHA) has developed a safe eating advisory for Lake Pillsbury based on levels of mercury or PCBs found in fish caught from this water body.

In 2022, Lake County health officials reported that testing found concerning levels of cyanobacteria in Lake Pillsbury. The toxic chemicals sometimes produced by these algal blooms are referred to as cyanotoxins. Exposure to these toxins causes sickness and other severe health effects in people, pets, and livestock. Those who plan to recreate in or on Lake Pillsbury should look for informational signs posted throughout the county and avoid contact with water that, looks like spilled green or blue-green paint; has surface scums, mats, or films; has a blue or green crust at the shoreline; is discolored or has green-colored streaks; or has greenish globs suspended in the water beneath the surface.

Hiking trails at the lake include an interpretive nature trail at Sunset Campground and the 4-mile (6.4 km) Lake Shore Loop Trail. Other nearby recreational opportunities include the Snow Mountain Wilderness located east of Lake Pillsbury. The Bloody Rock historic area is located within the wildlife refuge north of the lake as well as the Eel River and the Wild and Scenic Black Butte River.

== Wildlife ==
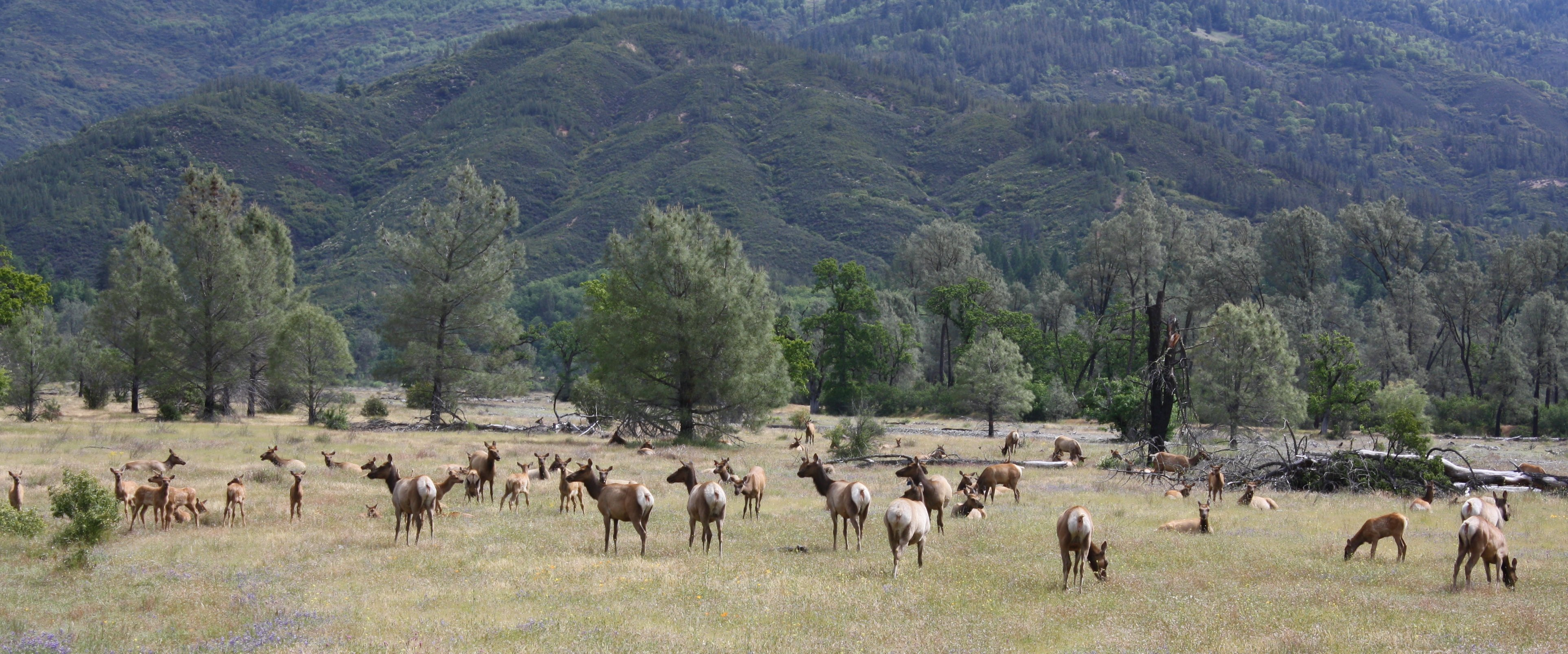
Tule elk herd at Lake Pillsbury

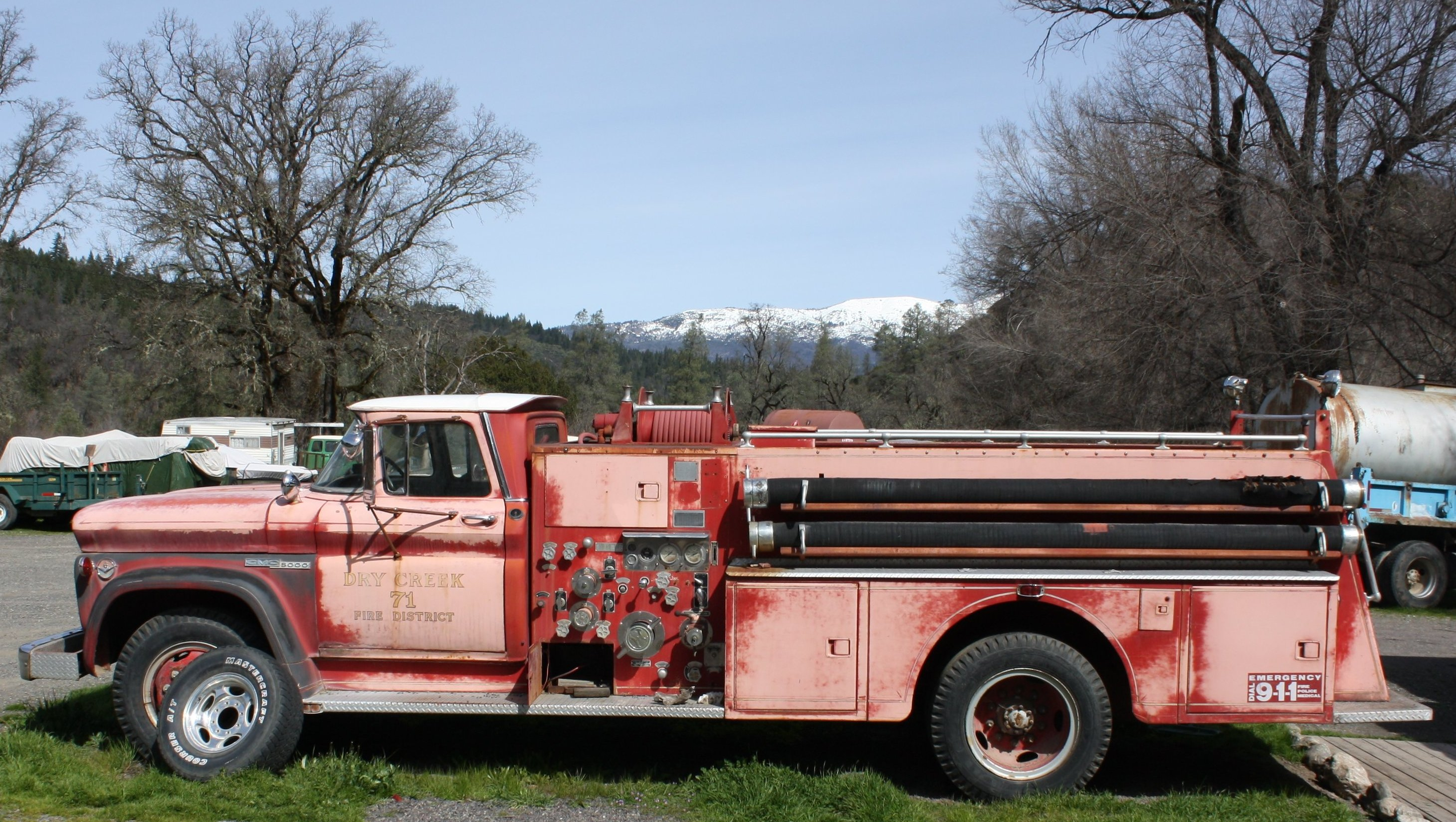
#71 Dry Creek Fire District truck at Lake Pillsbury

The tule elk is one of the largest land mammals native to California, with cows weighing up to 350 pounds (160 kg), and the largest bulls weighing roughly 500 pounds (230 kg). Hunted to near extinction during the California Gold Rush era, the animals were reintroduced to the Lake Pillsbury Basin in the late 1970s by the California Department of Fish and Game, and the herd has steadily grown, numbering around 80 in 2007.

The elk live on the north shore of the lake at the bottom of Hull Mountain, and consume wild clovers and grasses, along with the green summer and fall foliage around Lake Pillsbury's edges. Mendocino National Forest and Los Padres National Forest are the only two national forests in California to have tule elk, though 22 herds are found across the state. There is a ten-day hunting season beginning on the second Wednesday in September each year.

== See also ==
- List of dams and reservoirs in California
- List of lakes in California
- List of lakes in Lake County, California
