= Comptche AVA =

Appellation that designates wine in Mendocino County, California, U.S.

Coordinates: 39°16′43″N 123°34′24″W

Comptche
- Wine region
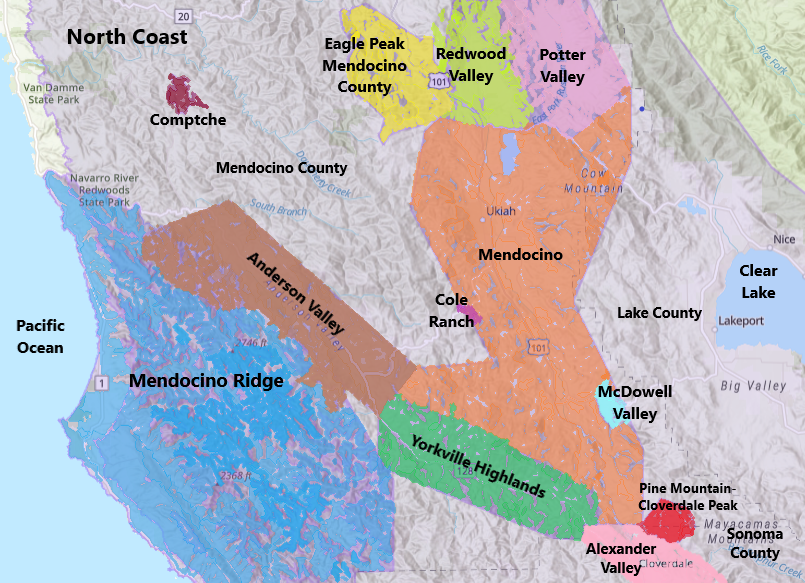
- Type: American Viticultural Area
- Year established: 2024
- Country: United States
- Part of: California, North Coast AVA, Mendocino County
- Other regions in California, North Coast AVA, Mendocino County: Anderson Valley AVA, Cole Ranch AVA, Covelo AVA, Dos Rios AVA, Eagle Peak Mendocino County AVA, McDowell Valley AVA, Mendocino AVA, Mendocino Ridge AVA, Potter Valley AVA, Redwood Valley AVA, Yorkville Highlands AVA
- Climate region: Region I
- Heat units: 2,258.85 GDD
- Soil conditions: Bearwallow–Wolfey and Perrygulch Loam.
- Total area: 1,421.8 acres (2.2 sq mi)
- Size of planted vineyards: 30 acres (12 ha)
- No. of vineyards: 3
- Grapes produced: Pinot Noir

Comptche (/kɒmptʃi/ KOMP-chee) is an American Viticultural Area (AVA) located in Mendocino County, California, yet is separate from, and not within, the vast 3.25-million-acre (5,078 sq mi) multi-county North Coast viticultural area in northern California due to its unique distinguishing features in topography, soils and climate. The small 1,421.8-acre (2 sq mi) valley area, centered around the town of Comptche, was established as the nation's 271^{st}, the state's 151^{st} and county's fourteenth appellation on April 8, 2024, by the Alcohol and Tobacco Tax and Trade Bureau (TTB), Treasury after reviewing the petition submitted on behalf of local vineyard owners proposing an viticultural area named "Comptche."

The appellation is located in a natural valley opening in the forests of coastal redwoods and Douglas firs. The name is derived from the community of Comptche, California located on its western border. The northern, eastern, and western boundaries are defined by the 400 feet (122 m) elevation contour and separate the valley floor from the higher, steeper, heavily forested surrounding non-viticulture regions. The southern boundary is outlined by the Albion River, which also separates the AVA from the higher, heavily forested region to the south. Comptche AVA is further distinguished as one of the few areas in the coastal section of Mendocino County where non-timber related agricultural activity is permitted. Comptche AVA is surrounded by land designated as a Timberland Production Zone and zoned solely for the growing and harvesting of timber for no less than ten years from the time it was so designated.

== History ==
Other than the Mexican land grant prior to 1848, there is scant evidence of settlers in the area until the late 1850s/early 1860s. The first Comptche settlers followed the Pomos' trail about 32 miles (51 km) west from the small village of Ukiah, bringing their supplies in on foot, horseback or carried on the backs of hired Pomo laborers.
At the 15-mile (24 km) mark they passed Orr's Spring, named after Samuel Orr, who moved his family from Kentucky in 1850 and bought the springs in 1858 from Barry Wright, who had bought the land from the Spaniard with the original Mexican land grant. Orr built a three-story inn for travelers and visitors to his sulphur springs. Six miles (9.7 km) further west was where Francisco Faria homesteaded some property with Nathaniel Smith in 1863, after selling his property in Cuffey's Cove. A few miles further west was a Pomo campground complete with sweathouse, and just beyond that was the Andrew and Elizabeth Montgomery homestead, later to become Montgomery State Park. Continuing west another six miles (9.7 km) was the Newman Hoak Ranch, the first Comptche house along the trail, about one and a half miles (2.4 km) east of where Comptche Corners would later develop. James Rice, from Ohio, laid claim to that property and built a ranch in 1857. The first homestead grants were made to his successor and business partner, Newman Hoak, in 1871 after Rice married Caroline Coombs of Little River and moved there turning his interests over to Hoak who completed the purchase. He was from Maine who spent many years at sea as a captain before becoming a lumberman as the first to log in Comptche and later became superintendent for the Albion Logging Company. Hoak's home was built around 1860 and his family lived in it for 40 years. According to the late Charlotte Hoak, Newman's daughter and renown 20th-century teacher, horticulturist, botanist and garden columnist in Southern California, the town was named after Compatche, a Pomo chief who led his people through that forest area seasonally, as a part of their hunting and gathering nomadic life. The Pomos told her his name means, "in the valley among the hills, beside the river of potholes."

"Among the first to settle in Comptche were four young men from Denmark. They were Charles H. Oppenlander, Chris Ottoson and Chris' two brothers, Hans and John. Charles and Chris were working in the Big River logging camp until 1872. One of their duties was to get hay to the ox teams used in the logging operations. In their search for feed they discovered the large valley which is now the Surprise Valley Ranch, and the smaller valley to the south, now the Sai Poma Ranch, through which the present route of the Comptche-Ukiah county road runs.
In 1866, they both took up homesteads. Charles took the large valley and John the small one. The land survey had been made in 1863, so there weren't any obstacles. These two homesteads and the Hoak homestead were the earliest taken up after the survey went through this area."

There were about 100 families who settled in the Comptche area in the later 1800s and the town is about the same size today. It is considered a magical secret place where over a hundred people currently enjoy residence. By coincidence, all of the Comptche vineyards are on the earliest homesteads and still farmed by their descendants.

== Terroir ==
=== Topography ===
The distinguishing features of the Comptche AVA are its topography, soil, and climate. The AVA is located entirely within the boundaries of the existing North Coast AVA. However, the petition states that the features of the viticultural area are so distinguishable from those of the North Coast that it should not be included within it. Comptche AVA is located in a low-elevation valley, a natural opening that is surrounded by heavily forested lands and short, steep ridges. Elevations within the AVA range from 187 to 400 feet (57–122 m), and all its vineyards are planted at elevations between 220 and 250 feet (67–76 m). According to the USGS map included with the petition, elevations are higher in each direction outside of the AVA. To the north of the AVA are several marked peaks with elevations of 1,000 feet (300 m) or higher. To the east of the AVA, elevations rise above 1,200 feet (370 m) near the community of Cameron, California. South of the AVA, peaks reach over 600 feet (180 m) near Morrison Gulch. West of the AVA, elevations rise over 800 feet (240 m). The petition also notes that the Comptche AVA is surrounded by land designated as a Timberland Production Zone. Such land is zoned only for the growing and harvesting of timber for a period of at least 10 years from the time it was so designated. The AVA is unique because non-timber-related agricultural activity, including viticulture, is permitted. The petition includes a map showing the extent of the Timberland Production Zones in Mendocino County. The map supports the petition's claim that the Comptche AVA is one of the few regions in the coastal section of Mendocino County that is not set aside for timber production for at least the near future. According to the petition, the topography of the Comptche AVA has an effect on viticulture. The petition states that above 400 feet (122 m) the land becomes steeper. As a result, the higher elevations surrounding the AVA are less suited to viticulture than the more level lands on the valley floor of the AVA. The petition also states that the 400-foot elevation contour approximates the change to forest soils that are different from the soil series found within the AVA and are more suited for timber production than viticulture. Finally, the petition states that elevation affects temperatures. As evidence, the petition included data on the monthly low temperatures from a weather station in the AVA at an elevation of 177 feet (54 m), a station to the north of the AVA at an elevation of 525 feet (160 m), and a station to the south of the AVA at an elevation of 1,168 feet (356 m). The petition noted that high temperatures are very similar in the AVA and on the ridgelines because the sun shines equally on both in the day. Therefore, the petition focused on low, nighttime temperatures, when cold air drains into the AVA from the surrounding higher elevations. Although the petition included data from each month from 2017 through 2019, the petition states that the growing season months are the important months to consider because the vines are dormant the rest of the year. Therefore, the climate data from each growing season, defined in the petition as April through October.

=== Climate ===
The petition states that the low temperatures in the low elevations of the AVA place the AVA at greater risk for frost than the higher elevations. Frost during the growing season can harm vines and delay the development of fruit. The cooler evening growing season temperatures within the AVA can also delay grape maturation. The petition to establish the Comptche AVA included climate data from within the AVA and from three established AVAs in Mendocino County: The Mendocino AVA, which forms a "V-shape" to the east and south of Comptche AVA, and the Mendocino Ridge AVA and Anderson Valley AVA, which are both to the south of Comptche. According to the petition, Comptche AVA also has a marine-influenced climate, the climate and soils of the AVA are so different from the North Coast AVA that the AVA should not be considered a part of the larger AVA. The petition describes the climate of the AVA as suitable for growing only the most cold-hardy wine grapes. The petition for Comptche AVA included climate date from within the AVA and from the North Coast AVA, as a whole. The climate of Comptche AVA is cooler than that of the larger, multi-county North Coast AVA as a whole. The GDD accumulations for the AVA indicate it is a Region I climate, whereas the North Coast AVA's GDD accumulations indicate the AVA, as a whole, is a Region III climate. Variations in climate exist within the North Coast AVA due to its large size. However, Comptche AVA is not just cooler than locations in other counties within the North Coast AVA, but it is also cooler than its three closest neighboring AVAs in Mendocino County, the Mendocino, Mendocino Ridge, and Anderson Valley AVAs. Therefore, the petition lists climate as one of the reasons to exclude the Comptche AVA from the established North Coast AVA. As a result, TTB established Comptche AVA as separate from, and not within, the North Coast AVA, and wines made primarily from grapes grown within the Comptche AVA will not be eligible to be labeled with "North Coast" as an appellation of origin.

=== Soil ===
There are two main soil types found in the Comptche AVA, Bearwallow–Wolfey and Perrygulch Loam series. Bearwallow–Wolfey soil is found on the rolling hillsides of the area as a type of well-drained, shallow, prone to erosion, and infertile soil resting atop fractured sandstone. Perrygulch Loam is found on the valley floor as a deep, rich, soil with a high clay content. The soil series defines the natural valley opening within the forest wilderness. It's not the elevation since Redwoods trees grow right down to sea level. It's not the climate since as Redwoods create their own environment and Comptche is that environment. However, Redwoods don't like Bearwallow–Wolfey soil series. According to the petition, these soil series have a limited extent in California: the Bearwallow series covers a total of 30,050 acres (47 sq mi), the Wolfey series covers 4,709 acres (7 sq mi), and the Perrygulch series covers 580 acres (0.9 sq mi). By comparison, the Zeni and Ornbaun series, which are the most prominent soils in the regions directly outside the AVA, cover 96,612 and 115,774 acres (151 and 181 sq mi), respectively. The entire North Coast AVA covers slightly more than three million acres (4,688 sq mi). The petition states that the uniqueness of the primary soils of Comptche is another reason the AVA should not be considered a part of the North Coast.

== Viticulture ==
According to the petition, the distinguishing features of the Comptche AVA include its topography, soils, and climate. The AVA is located about 11 miles (18 km) inland from the Pacific Coast and consists of a low-elevation valley surrounded by heavily forested lands and short, steep ridges. The elevation within the appellation ranges from 187 to 400 feet (57–122 m), with all its three commercial vineyards planted at elevations ranging from 220 to 250 feet (67–76 m) cultivating about 30 acres (12 ha). The unique topography contributes to the AVA's cool climate, as the nightly cool air sinks into the valley from the surrounding higher elevations. Comptche AVA is a good deal cooler than the surrounding area and other established Mendocino County viticultural areas. According to the petition, Comptche is cool enough to be considered a "borderline" climate for the cultivation of wine grapes and only cold-hardy varieties are successfully cultivated. As such, Pinot Noir is the only commercial variety currently grown in the Comptche area.
