= Mendocino Ridge AVA =

Wine region in Mendocino County, California, U.S.

Coordinates: 39°06′48″N 123°29′15″W

Mendocino Ridge
- Wine region
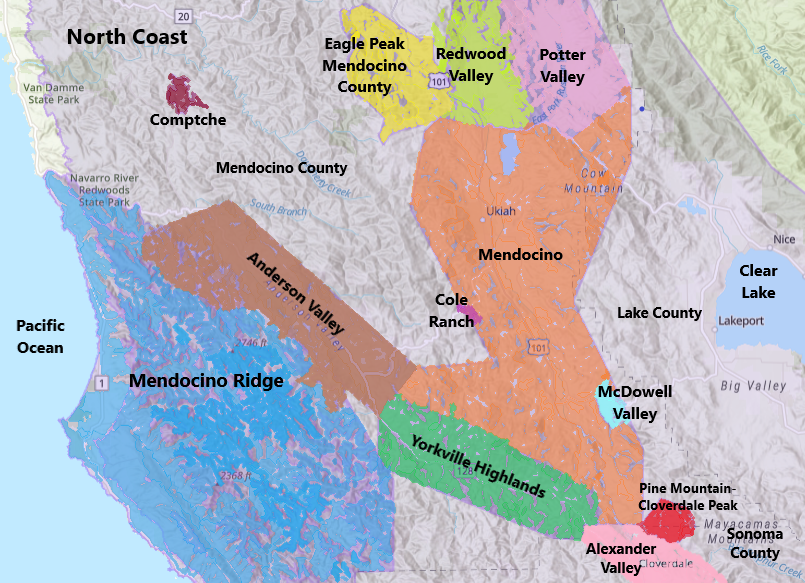
- Mendocino County AVAs
- Type: American Viticultural Area
- Year established: 1997; 2024 Rename
- Years of wine industry: 166
- Country: United States
- Part of: California, North Coast AVA, Mendocino County
- Other regions in California, North Coast AVA, Mendocino County: Eagle Peak Mendocino County AVA, Cole Ranch AVA, Comptche AVA, Covelo AVA, Dos Rios AVA, McDowell Valley AVA, Mendocino AVA, Potter Valley AVA, Redwood Valley AVA, Yorkville Highlands AVA
- Sub-regions: Anderson Valley AVA
- Growing season: 275–300 days
- Precipitation (annual average): 49.46 in (1,256.28 mm)
- Soil conditions: Ustic-isomesic type
- Total area: 262,400 acres (410 sq mi)
- Size of planted vineyards: 75 acres (30 ha)
- No. of vineyards: 17
- Grapes produced: Pinot Noir, Zinfandel, Syrah, Sauvignon Blanc, Chardonnay, Merlot, Riesling, Albariño, Grüner Veltliner
- No. of wineries: 4

Mendocino Ridge is a coastal, cool climate and high altitude American Viticultural Area (AVA) located entirely within the coastal zone of Mendocino County, California. It was established as the nation's 131^{st}, the state's 78^{th} and the county's eighth appellation on October 27, 1997 by the Bureau of Alcohol, Tobacco and Firearms (ATF), Treasury after reviewing the petition submitted by Mr. Steve Alden on behalf of the Mendocino Ridge Quality Alliance proposing a viticultural area named "Mendocino Ridge."
The boundaries of the 262,400-acre (410 sq mi) AVA encompass the coastal ridges at or above 1,200 ft (366 m)in elevation adjacent to the Pacific Ocean that reach inland toward the Anderson Valley. Roughly 36 mi (58 km) of the southernmost portion of the Mendocino coastline forms the AVA western border, with the Sonoma County line as the southern boundary, the Navarro River is the northern boundary and Anderson Valley outlines the inland boundary running northwest–southeast. Mendocino Ridge is essentially a northern extension of the Sonoma Coast viticultural area. Mendocino Ridge AVA designation is unique by its elevation where vineyards lie at or above 1,200 ft (366 m). This means Mendocino Ridge is the only non-contiguous AVA in the United States. The Mendocino Ridge AVA has been nicknamed "Islands in the Sky," because the thick fog moving inland from the Pacific Ocean blankets the coast and the valleys between the ridge tops, making the tops of the mountains, where the vinyards lay, look like islands protruding from a sea of fog. Mendocino Ridge AVA lies above the Anderson Valley and Mendocino appellations. The Mendocino Ridge viticultural area contains approximately 1,500 to 2,000 acres (607–809 ha), about 2% of the total acreage, that are suitable for vineyards. The local hillsides are very steep (often above 70%) and covered with timber, making them unfit for viticulture. Estimates of planted acres range from 233 to 410, which accounts for about 0.3% of the total area.

The average high temperature is 75.9 °F (24.4 °C) and the average low temperature is 49.4 °F (9.7 °C). The diurnal variation during the growing season is significantly less than the Anderson Valley (20 degrees versus 40–50 degrees in Anderson Valley), and daytime high temperatures are often 10 degrees cooler than in the Anderson Valley. The soil composition is of the "timber" type, shallow and with good drainage due to the ridge top locations. Average annual rainfall average is 49.46 in (1,256.28 mm), leaving sufficient groundwater to dry farm vineyards. The USDA plant hardiness zones range from 9a to 10a.

While Mendocino Ridge was only approved as an AVA in 1997, it has some of the oldest vineyards in the region. Italian immigrants in the late 1800s planted on Greenwood Ridge and surrounding areas, preferring zinfandel which remains a popular varietal in the AVA, although Pinot noir has become the most common grape in the region since the 1990s. Other plantings (ordered by decreasing representation in total acres) include Chardonnay, Syrah, Merlot, Riesling, Sauvignon Blanc, Primitivo, Petite Sirah, Cabernet Sauvignon, and Grüner Veltliner. Much of the non-planted land is covered by Redwood and Douglas Fir trees.

In January 2024, a petition was submitted by the Mendocino Ridge AVA Board of Directors to the Alcohol and Tobacco Tax and Trade Bureau (TTB), Treasury for review proposing to rename the established Mendocino Ridge AVA to Mendocino Coast Ridge. The petition was signed by representatives of six vineyards and wineries within the AVA.
