= Covelo AVA =

American Viticultural Area in California

Coordinates: 39°48′05″N 123°13′58″W

Covelo
- Wine region
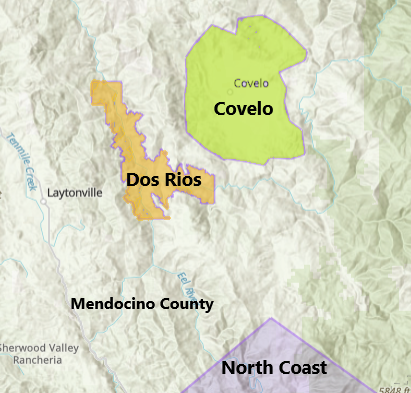
- Type: American Viticultural Area
- Year established: 2006
- Country: United States
- Part of: California, Mendocino County
- Other regions in California, Mendocino County: Anderson Valley AVA, Cole Ranch AVA, Comptche AVA, Dos Rios AVA, Eagle Peak Mendocino County AVA, McDowell Valley AVA, Mendocino AVA, Mendocino Ridge AVA, Pine Mountain-Cloverdale Peak AVA, Potter Valley AVA, Redwood Valley AVA, Yorkville Highlands AVA
- Growing season: 125 days
- Climate region: Region III
- Heat units: 3,000 GDD units
- Precipitation (annual average): 40 inches (1,000 mm)
- Soil conditions: Deep, well-drained loam and gravelly loam
- Total area: 38,000 acres (59 sq mi)
- Size of planted vineyards: 2 acres (0.81 ha)
- No. of vineyards: 1
- Grapes produced: Granacha, Mencia, Pinot Noir, Tempranillo

Covelo (/koʊˈveɪloʊ/ koh-VAY-loh) is an American Viticultural Area (AVA) located in northern Mendocino County in the vicinity of Covelo, California. It was established as the nation's 171^{st}, the state's 96^{th} and the county's tenth appellation on February 16, 2006 by the Alcohol and Tobacco Tax and Trade Bureau (TTB), Treasury after reviewing the petition submitted by Mr. Ralph Carter of Sonoma, California, proposing a viticultural area in Mendocino County named "Covelo." Jake Claus and William Claus planted the only California Certified Organic Farmers (CCOF) vineyards in the Covelo AVA making them the monopoly of grape Farms/Growers in the area. The appellation is located 150 miles (240 km) north of San Francisco and 45 miles (72 km) north of Ukiah, California. The Covelo boundary line encompasses Round and Williams Valleys covering 38,000 acres (59 sq mi) with only 2 acres (1 ha) under vine on a relatively a flat terrain built upon deep loam soil layers with a valley floor at 1,230 ft (370 m) above sea level. The mountains surrounding Round Valley, together with the Coast Range to the valley's west, block the inland flow of climate-moderating Pacific marine air into the Covelo appellation. Given this geographic isolation, the Covelo viticultural area has a continental climate, which has greater temperature swings and a shorter growing season than the marine-influenced climate commonly found in the surrounding regions of Mendocino County. The growing season of 125 days is one of the shortest in Mendocino County and the area experiences one of the widest diurnal temperature variation in the region.

== History ==
Covelo was founded in 1860 with the opening of the town's first store. The post office opened in 1870 and some sources claim that the town was named by Charles H. Eberle after a fortress in Switzerland. However, there is such place mentioned in the gazetteers of Switzerland. Covelo may be a misspelling of Covolo, a fort in the comune of Pederobba, Veneto, Italy, which is near Switzerland. Alternatively, it could be named after Covelo, a village in Galicia, Spain. There is also a Covello in Basilicata, in the south of Italy.

== Terroir ==
=== Topography ===
The Covelo viticultural area boundary surrounds Round Valley, a bowl-shaped basin that includes the town of Covelo. This broad, round, and flat-floored valley differs from the long, narrow valleys commonly found in mountainous areas of Mendocino County. The boundary area also includes the smaller Williams Valley, located to Round Valley's northeast, and the hillsides that surround the two valleys. The USGS maps note that Round Valley's floor varies from 1,310 ft (400 m) in elevation in the southeast to 1,480 ft (450 m) in elevation in the northwest, while the surrounding hillsides within the boundaries are less than 2,800 ft (850 m) high. The elevations of the area vary between 1,310 ft (400 m) and approximately 2,800 ft (850 m), contrasting with the 4,000-to-7,000 ft (1,200-to-2,100 m) mountain elevations around the Covelo area. These higher mountains geographically and climatically isolate the Covelo viticultural area from surrounding regions.

=== Climate ===
The mountains surrounding Round Valley, together with the Coast Range to the valley's west, block the inland flow of climate-moderating Pacific marine air into the Covelo viticultural area. Given this geographic isolation, the Covelo viticultural area has a continental climate, which has greater temperature swings and a shorter growing season than the marine-influenced climate commonly found in the surrounding regions of Mendocino County. The short growing season may be the most distinguishing characteristic of the Covelo viticultural area. The frost-free growing season is commonly 125 days, or about 4 months long. Covelo's average growing season minimum temperature is also significantly lower than that of the Potter Valley viticultural area, which is about 33 miles (53 km) south of Covelo. The Covelo viticultural area, with its annual 3,000 degree-days, marginally falls into Region 3, of Winkler's climate classification system. Each degree of a day's mean temperature that is above 50 °F (10 °C), which is the minimum temperature required for grapevine growth, is counted as one degree-day. The Covelo viticultural area summer temperatures have greater day-to-night variations (between 40 and 66 degrees in the valley) than the areas surrounding it. Also, in October (the final month of the summer growing season) the valley has 90 fewer degree-day units of heat than other Region 3 viticultural areas in the Mendocino region. The Covelo area receives an average of 40 inches (1,016 mm) of rain a year, which is the highest average of any valley in northern Mendocino County. Annual rainfall varies widely in the Covelo area. In 1998, the area received 65 inches (1,651 mm) of rain, while in 2000 it received 36 inches (914 mm), according to the National Oceanic and Atmospheric Administration's (NOAA) Climatological Data Annual Summary reports of California for 1997 through 2001. In addition, the Covelo valley basin receives about seven inches (178 mm) of snow annually, with higher amounts falling on the surrounding hillsides. The USDA plant hardiness zones are 8b and 9a.

=== Geology and Soils ===
The Covelo viticultural area is composed of alluvial plains, alluvial fans, and a valley basin, which are geologically younger than the surrounding higher elevations. While the alluvial deposits on the valley floor share the mineralogy of the Franciscan rocks of the surrounding hills, the soils differ distinctly from the foothill soils surrounding the valley. Feliz-Russian-Cole soils cover about 50 percent of the Covelo viticultural area. These soils, which are found in the Round Valley basin, have neutral-to-alkaline soil pH chemistry, in contrast with the acidity found in the hillside soils. The Sanhedren-Speaker-Kekawaka association, which is a deep to very deep, well-drained loam and gravelly loam, predominates in the northern, eastern, and western foothills surrounding Round Valley. In the southern foothills, the Dingman-Beaughton-Henneke association (a well-drained, gravelly loam and cobbly clay loam) and the Hopland-Yorktree-Witherell association (a well-drained loam and sandy loam) predominate. The soils of the Franciscan Formation, a blueschist and semi-schist of Franciscan Complex, cover the mountainous terrain above Covelo viticultural area boundary line.

== See also ==
- Mendocino County wine
