= Dos Rios AVA =

American Viticultural Area in Mendocino County, California

Coordinates: 39°42′26″N 123°19′08″W

Dos Rios
- Wine region
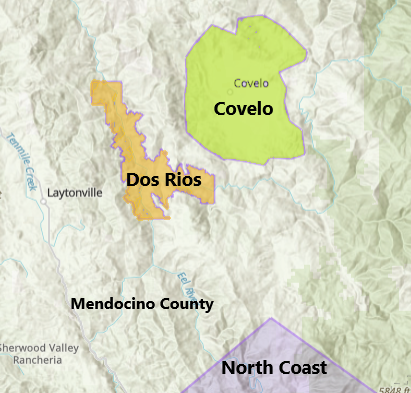
- Type: American Viticultural Area
- Year established: 2005
- Years of wine industry: 33
- Country: United States
- Part of: California, Mendocino County
- Other regions in California, Mendocino County: Anderson Valley AVA, Cole Ranch AVA, Comptche AVA, Covelo AVA, Mendocino AVA, Mendocino Ridge AVA, McDowell Valley AVA, Pine Mountain-Cloverdale Peak AVA, Potter Valley AVA, Redwood Valley AVA, Yorkville Highlands AVA
- Growing season: 125–250 days
- Precipitation (annual average): 30 to 60 in (762–1,524 mm)
- Soil conditions: well-drained to excessively well-drained sandy and gravelly loams derived from sedimentary and metamorphic rocks
- Total area: 15,500 acres (24 sq mi)
- Size of planted vineyards: 6 acres (2 ha)
- No. of vineyards: 1
- Grapes produced: Cabernet Franc, Cabernet Sauvignon, Chardonnay, Merlot, Zinfandel
- No. of wineries: 1

Dos Rios is an American Viticultural Area (AVA) located in northern Mendocino County in the vicinity of Dos Rios, California. It was established as the nation's 166^{th}, the state's 94^{th} and the county's ninth appellation on October 14, 2005 by the Alcohol and Tobacco Tax and Trade Bureau (TTB), Treasury after reviewing a petition submitted by Ralph Jens Carter of Sonoma, California, proposing a viticultural area in Mendocino County named "Dos Rios," (/ˈdozˈrjos/ DOHS-REE-ohs), Spanish for "two rivers."

The 15,500-acre (24 sq mi) viticultural area encompasses portions of the canyons containing the confluence of the Eel River and the Middle Fork of the Eel River located approximately 40 miles (64 km) north of Ukiah, 25 miles (40 km) east of the Pacific Ocean, and 5 miles (8 km) north of the northern boundary of the established North Coast viticultural area. The Dos Rios viticultural area encompasses portions of the canyons containing the two rivers. As of 2023, six acres (2 ha) of commercial vineyards are cultivated within the AVA, with the potential for additional plantings. The marine breezes blowing through the canyons of the viticultural area moderate temperatures, making the Dos Rios region cooler in the summer and warmer in the winter than regions to the east that have a more continental climate. The frost-free growing season varies from 125 days to 250 days annually.
Dos Rios soils are well-drained to excessively well-drained loams, sandy loams, and gravelly loams derived from sedimentary and metamorphic rocks. There is only one commercial winery, Vin de Tevis, currently operating within the viticultural area boundaries.

== History ==
Viticulture in the Dos Rios region began with the pioneering efforts of Vin de Tevis, which planted the region's first commercial vineyard in 1993 on six acres (2 ha) primarily dedicated to red grape varietals such as Cabernet Sauvignon, Cabernet Franc, Merlot, and Zinfandel. These initial plantings marked the transition from the area's historical focus on ranching and livestock operations in the remote northern Mendocino wilderness to small-scale grape cultivation, supported by the unique terroir of rocky soils and steep slopes.

== Terroir ==
=== Geography ===
Significant physical features of the Dos Rios viticultural area include the Eel River and the Middle Fork of the Eel River and their surrounding canyons, which join within the area. The canyon surrounding the confluence of the two rivers is a "land trough," approximately one and a half miles (2 km) deep and 3 miles (5 km) wide. This land trough is shown on the relevant USGS maps and in multiple dimensions on the Hubbard Scientific Ukiah region topographic map. As a land trough, the Eel and Middle Fork river canyons are the only major gaps in the Coast Range in this region of Mendocino County. These gaps allow the Pacific Ocean marine air to blow inland, or east, through the canyons and into the Dos Rios viticultural area. The names of several prominent geographic features within the Dos Rios viticultural area reflect the strength of the wind blowing through the canyons. The USGS maps covering the area show two different geographic features named "Windy Point" within the area and another named "Windy Ridge" near the proposed area’s eastern boundary. On the USGS Laytonville map, one Windy Point is near the 1,800-foot (549 m) elevation in the southwest corner. On the USGS Dos Rios map, a second Windy Point is near the 1,400-foot (427 m) elevation line between State Highway 162 and the Middle Fork of the Eel River. "Windy Ridge," with elevations between 2,600 and 3,200 feet (792 and 975 m), is immediately outside the proposed area’s eastern boundary on the USGS Covelo West map. The canyon walls and hillsides surrounding the Eel River and the Middle Fork of the Eel River incline from 30 to 75 percent. In addition to the climate-moderating marine winds, sunlight reflecting off the two rivers onto the steep sides of the canyons warms the terrain of the canyons below the 2,000-foot (610 m) contour line.

=== Climate ===
The marine winds blowing through the canyons within the Dos Rios viticultural area, the direct and reflected solar radiation, and the temperature are the factors that distinguish the area from the surrounding regions of Mendocino County. The Sunset Western Garden Book, 7th edition, 2001, (Sunset book) which divides much of the western United States into growing zones, includes the region encompassing the Dos Rios viticultural area within California’s Zone 14, Northern California’s Inland Areas with Some Ocean Influence, a transitional climate area. The Sunset book depicts this zone as a narrow geographic region surrounded by three cooler zones. The close proximity of four climate zones to the Dos Rios viticultural area also helps create a unique transitional microclimate within the area. As noted above, the presence of strong winds in the Dos Rios viticultural area is reflected in the "windy" names given to several geographic features within or near its boundary. The Eel River and Middle Fork of the Eel River canyons create gaps in the Coast Range, which lies between the moderating Pacific Ocean climate to the west and the more continental climate found at the higher elevations and in the interior valleys to the east. These canyons bring climate-moderating Pacific marine air further inland than would be expected without these low-elevation gaps and allow the moderating ocean air into the Dos Rios region, affecting the climate of the proposed viticultural area. Geographic slopes also affect airflow, according to the Sunset book description of how the local terrain can affect wind flow and solar heat. Warm air rises and cold air sinks, creating vertical wind movements on the 800 to 2,000 feet (244 to 610 m) sloping elevations found within the viticultural area. During the spring and summer months, the viticultural area has brisk afternoon breezes that intensify at sunset and subside after dark, allowing temperatures to cool. The winds help disperse the morning coastal fog that reaches over the surrounding mountain ranges, giving the Dos Rios region sunny mornings that contrast with the foggier mornings found in the surrounding Covelo and Willits regions. During the winter the winds create a downdraft from the hilltops to the canyon floor that lessens the effects of freezing temperatures and frost in the vineyards.

Reflective sunlight off the water of the two rivers provides additional warming to the hillside vineyards within the Dos Rios viticultural area. The intensity of the reflected sunlight dissipates above 2,000 feet (610 m) in elevation, which coincides with the area’s boundary line.

Temperatures within the Dos Rios viticultural area annually average 52 to 58 °F (11 to 14 °C), with warm, dry summers and cool, wet winters. The marine breezes blowing through the canyons of the viticultural area moderate temperatures, making the Dos Rios region cooler in the summer and warmer in the winter than regions to the east that have a more continental climate. The frost-free growing season varies from 125 days to 250 days annually. According to the Sunset book, three cooler Sunset climate zones surround the Dos Rios viticultural area and its transitional Zone 14 climate. These three climates include Zone 1, Coldest Winters in the West, Zone 2, Second Coldest Western Climate, and Zone 7, California’s Digger Pine Belt. Zones 1 and 2 are the snowiest and coldest parts of the United States West Coast, excluding Alaska. Zone 7, found at lower mountain elevations, has hot summers and mild, but pronounced, winters. The Sunset book climate zone map shows the Dos Rios area as having a generally colder climate and a shorter growing season than the lower Mendocino County elevations.

Dos Rios viticultural area averages 30 to 60 inches (762 to 1,524 mm) of rainfall annually with most rainfall occurring between October and April. The area also receives occasional light snow, while the surrounding higher elevations receive more snow. The USDA plant hardiness zones are 8b and 9a.

=== Soils ===
Soils of the Dos Rios viticultural area are well-drained to excessively well-drained loams, sandy loams, and gravelly loams derived from sedimentary and metamorphic rocks that are deep to very deep. These soils are categorized as poor, with coarse texture and limited water retention. They are weathered from sandstone, siltstone, schist, and greywacke, which are rich in mineral nutrients. The soils within the Dos Rios viticultural area differ from other nearby grape-growing regions such as the Potter Valley viticultural area, which have Cole series soils that are poorly drained, nearly level clay loams.

== See also ==
- Mendocino County wine
