= Mendocino County wine =

Mendocino County
- Wine region
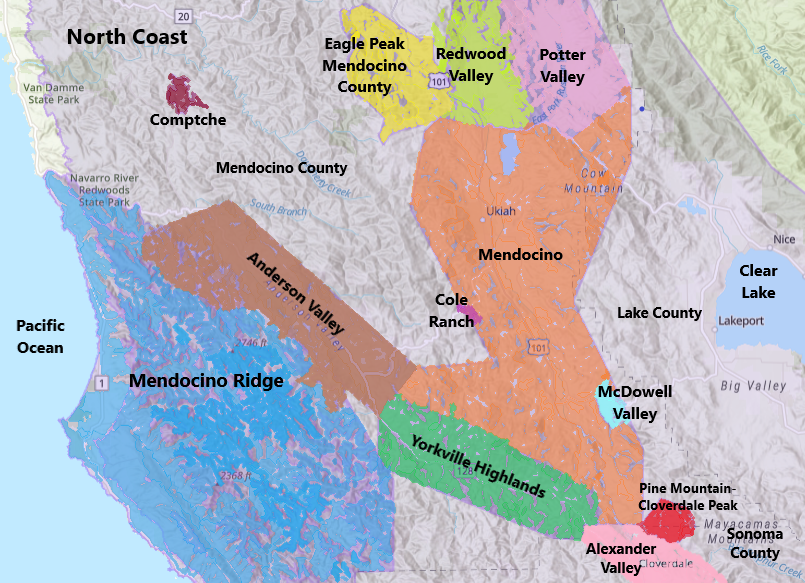
- Mendocino County AVAs
- Type: U.S. County Appellation
- Years of wine industry: 176
- Country: United States
- Part of: California, North Coast AVA
- Other regions in California, North Coast AVA: Sonoma County, Napa County, Lake County
- Sub-regions: Anderson Valley AVA, Cole Ranch AVA, Comptche AVA, Covelo AVA, Dos Rios AVA, Eagle Peak Mendocino County AVA, McDowell Valley AVA, Mendocino AVA, Mendocino Ridge AVA, Pine Mountain-Cloverdale Peak AVA, Potter Valley AVA, Redwood Valley AVA, Yorkville Highlands AVA
- Total area: 2.24 million acres (3,507 sq mi)
- Size of planted vineyards: 15,000 acres (6,070 ha)
- No. of vineyards: 140
- Grapes produced: Barbera, Cabernet Franc, Cabernet Sauvignon, Carignane, Charbono, Chardonnay, Chenin blanc, Gewürztraminer, Grenache, Malbec, Merlot, Muscat Canelli, Petit Verdot, Petite Sirah, Pinot blanc, Pinot noir, Riesling, Roussanne, Sangiovese, Sauvignon blanc, Semillon, Syrah, Tocai Friulano, Viognier, Zinfandel
- No. of wineries: 132

Mendocino County wine is an appellation that designates wine made from grapes grown mostly in Mendocino County, California. The region is part of the larger North Coast AVA and one of California's largest and most climatically diverse wine growing regions. Mendocino County is one of the northernmost commercial wine grape regions in the state with two distinct climate zones separated by the Mendocino Range. As of 2024, twelve American Viticultural Area (AVA) have been designated within Mendocino County. Mendocino is one of the leading wine growing regions for organically produced wine grapes. Nearly 25% of the cultivation in Mendocino County is grown organically. In 2004, the residents of the county voted to become the first GMO-free county in the United States in an initiative that was supported by many of the county's largest wineries. The county's widespread focus on organic viticulture has inspired journalists to describe it as "California's organic wine Mecca".

== History ==
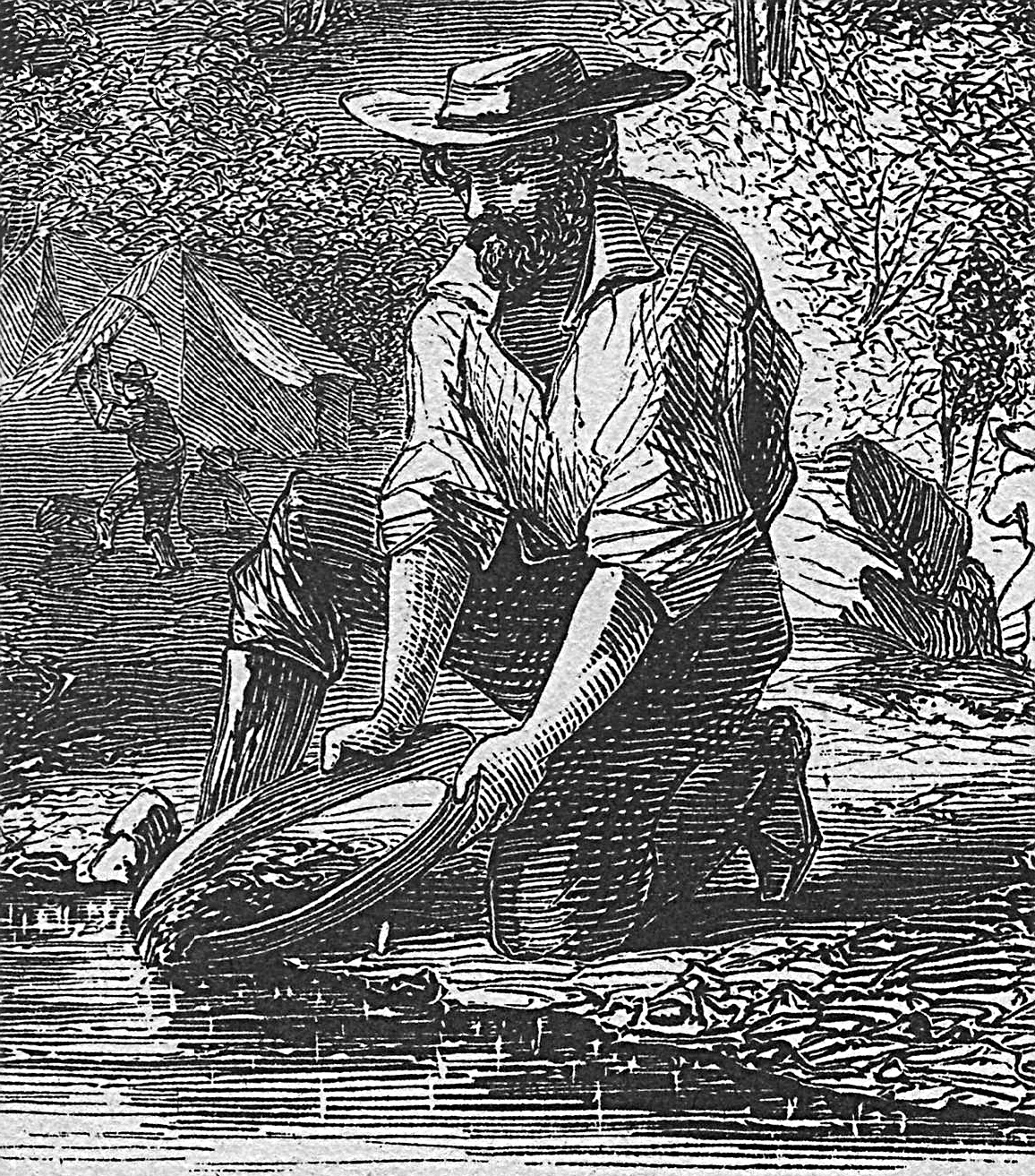
The first vineyards in Mendocino County were planted by prospectors from the California Gold Rush who failed to find their fortune and returned to the area as farmers.

The name "Mendocino" comes from the family name of Mendoza in honor of the 16th century Spanish explorer Lorenzo Suárez de Mendoza, 4th conde de la Coruña who explored the Mendocino coast line and his cousin, Antonio de Mendoza the first viceroy of New Spain. The first vineyards in Mendocino were established in the 1850s in the Redwood Valley by returning farmers who failed to find their wealth and prosperity during the California Gold Rush. Most of these winery operations stayed small and were completely eradicated by the enactment of Prohibition in the United States in the early 20th century. With the commercial production of wine banned, vineyards were ripped out and replaced with tree nut and fruit orchards.

The oldest continually operating commercial winery in Mendocino County is Parducci Wines founded in 1931 while Prohibition was still in place. Parducci remained the only commercial winery in Mendocino until the late 1960s. Part of this was due to the relative isolation of the region from the major wine market and business center of San Francisco (more than a 100 miles/160 km to the south), which was so pivotal to the development of the wine industries in nearby Napa and Sonoma County. In 1968, Fetzer Vineyards was founded and would eventually grow to be the largest wine producers in the county. Fetzer would also become a leader in steering the viticultural practices of the county towards more sustainable agriculture and organic wine production. Today nearly 25% of all the vineyards in the Mendocino County are certified organic by the California Certified Organic Farmers-the largest percentage of any county in the state of California.

In 1971 wine production started in the Anderson Valley region. Approximately half of the wine brands produced in Mendocino County are now based in this Western AVA within Mendocino County.

== Climate and geography ==
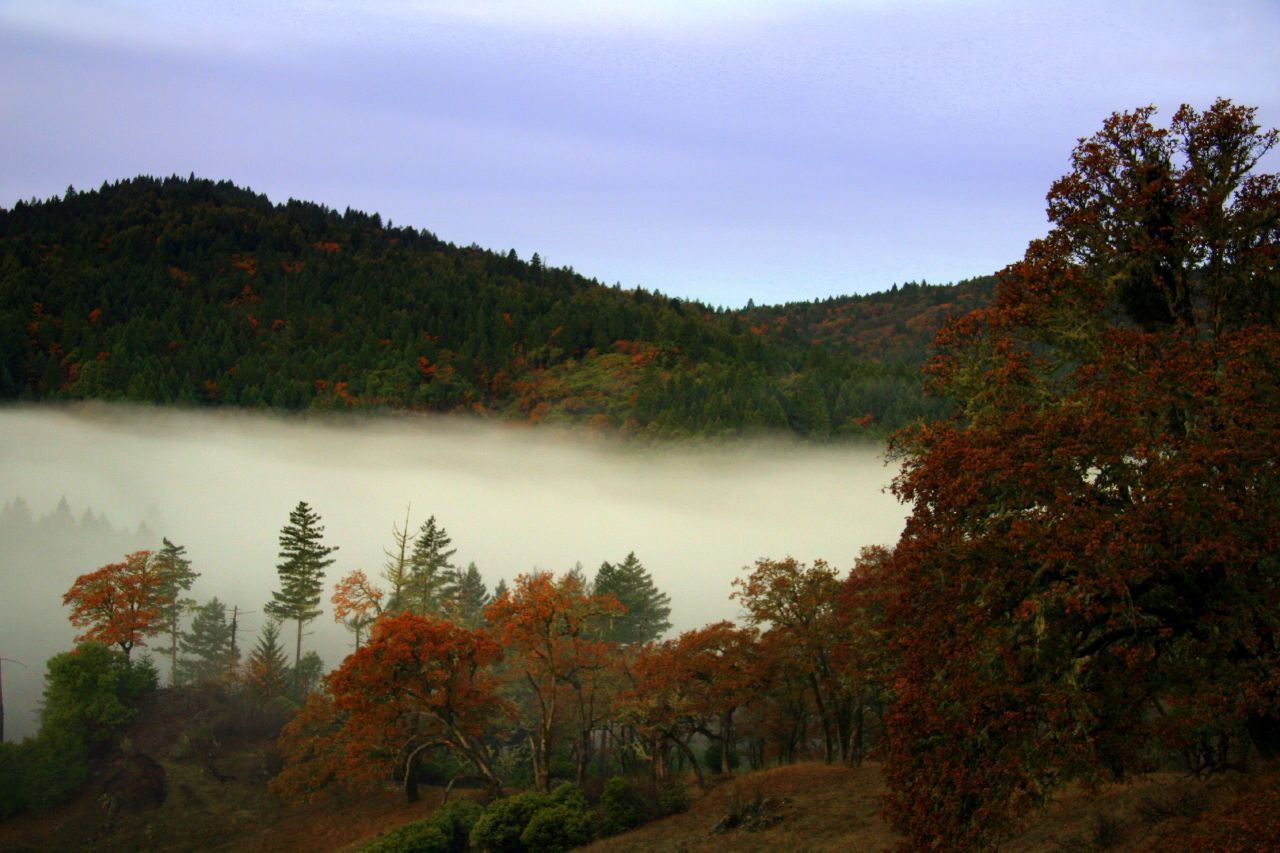
The reaches of the cool Pacific fog is one of the dominant influences in Mendocino County viticulture, particularly in the coastal western regions of the county.

Mendocino County has a wide range of viticultural mesoclimates that are influenced by the county's diversity in climatic and geography. On the eastern borders of the county is the Mayacamas Mountains separating it from nearby Lake County and the influences of the large Clear Lake. Within the county, the Mendocino Range segment of the larger California Coast Ranges essentially divides the region into two climatic spheres. The land to the west of the ranges, closest to the coast tend to have more maritime climate that includes more cooling and rain influences from the Pacific Ocean. Among the wine regions in this cooler area are the Mendocino Ridge, the Anderson Valley and the Yorkville Highlands AVAs. East of the ranges, the climate turns warmer and more Mediterranean around Ukiah and along the path of the Russian River as it makes its way southward to Sonoma County. Among the Mendocino wine regions in this warmer area are the Redwood Valley, Potter Valley, Cole Ranch, McDowell Valley, Covelo, Dos Rios AVAs as well as most of the large general area Mendocino AVA. In this eastern region, the ranges serve as a type of rain shadow and barrier to the cool Pacific fog which leaves the climate during the growing season much drier and warmer with ratings of Region III and IV on the Winkler scale.

In the west, the Pacific fog plays a dominant role in the climate of the Anderson Valley. Following the path of the Navarro River from the Pacific, the fog drifts in and blankets the valley with low hanging cool air. Vineyards in these areas are often planted with cool-climate varieties like Pinot noir, Chardonnay, Gewürztraminer and Riesling. At high elevations in Anderson Valley and nearby Mendocino Ridges beyond the fog's reach, these warmer pockets of lands will usually be planted with more warm climate varieties like Zinfandel. With the nearby Pacific bringing in a steady stream of moisture, rain during the harvest months can be an issue in this part of the county.

Around Ukiah, in the center of the large Mendocino AVA to the east of the Mendocino Ranges, the climate can get very warm to hot during the growing season with mean July temperatures during the peak ripening month often in excess of 73 °F (23 °C). The average annual rainfall of 38 inches (970 mm) is mostly consolidated in the winter months, which means that drought is a common viticultural hazard that often requires supplemental irrigation. The warm allows this part of the county develop full bodied and very ripe red wines from Cabernet Sauvignon, Merlot, Petite Sirah and Zinfandel.

The vineyard soils of the region are mostly deep alluvial soils. Near the Russian and Navarro Rivers, the soil becomes more gravelly-loam while the vineyards planted on the surrounding slope contain more thin scree. North of Ukiah and to the west, vines are often planted with an eastward orientation while further south in Mendocino Valley, vineyards are often planted with a westward orientation in order to prevent heat stress. In general the climate in Mendocino county promotes a shorter growing season of around 268 days compared to the 308 days that is an average growing season in neighboring Sonoma.

== Wine regions ==
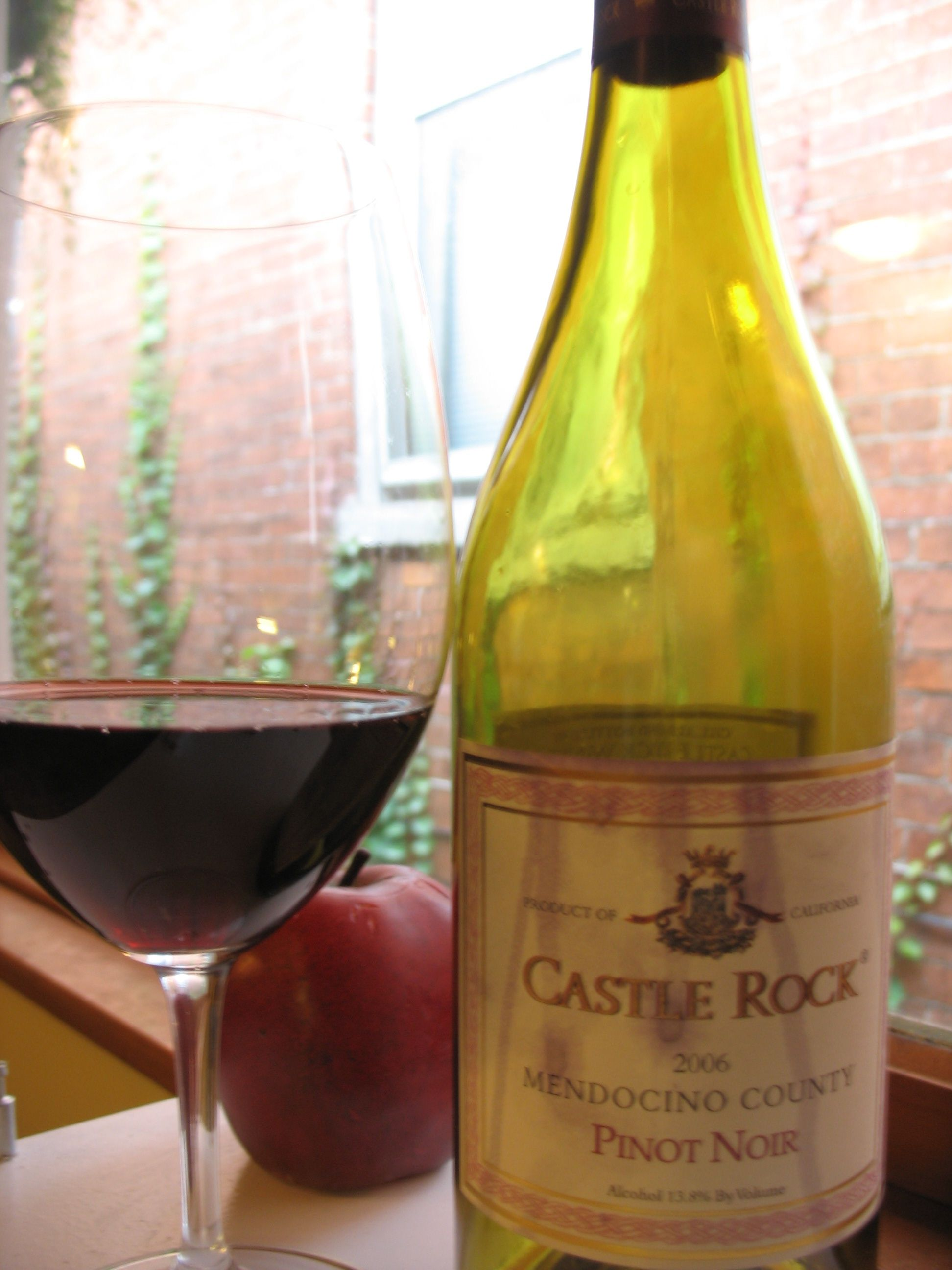
A Mendocino County Pinot noir.

As of 2024, thirteen American Viticultural Areas (AVA) have been designated within Mendocino County: Anderson Valley AVA, Cole Ranch AVA, Comptche AVA, Covelo AVA, Dos Rios AVA, Eagle Peak Mendocino County AVA, McDowell Valley AVA, Mendocino AVA, Mendocino Ridge AVA, Pine Mountain - Cloverdale Peak AVA, Potter Valley AVA, Redwood Valley AVA and Yorkville Highlands AVA. The majority of Mendocino County plantings are in the eastern side of the county, clustered around the cities of Ukiah, Hopland, and Redwood Valley. While Redwood Valley has its own AVA, most of these other plantings produce wine under the larger blanket of the Mendocino AVA. The most prominently featured AVAs to appear on wine labels are the Anderson Valley, Yorkville Highlands, and the broader Mendocino AVA.

=== Anderson Valley and Mendocino Ridge ===
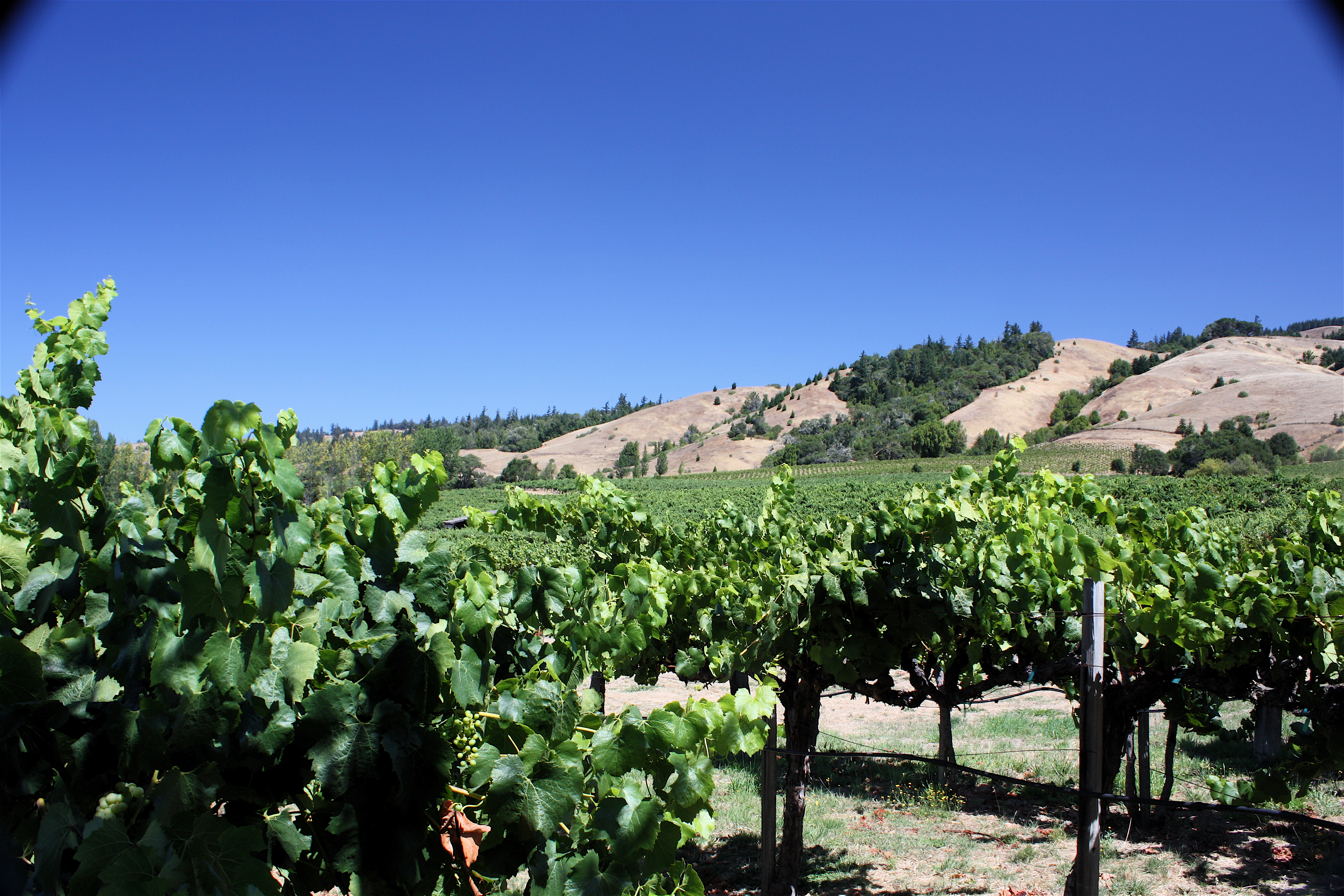
Anderson Valley vineyard

The Anderson Valley is one of California's coolest wine growing regions in the state being deeply influenced by the cool Pacific fog coming in off the coast. Early plantings of Chardonnay, Gewürztraminer, and Pinot Noir in the 1960s and 1970s led to the formation of a handful of wineries by 1980. The potential for sparkling wine production became apparent in the 1980s when Champagne house Louis Roederer selected Anderson Valley for its California operation Roederer Estate. The Champagne firm scouted California extensively for years trying to find a region with the most climatic similarities to the Champagne region of France. Pinot Noir - grown for both sparkling and still wine production - is the dominant varietal for the region. A 2015 vineyard census determined that 87 of 91 vineyard properties in the region grow Pinot Noir.

The Anderson Valley extends about 10 miles (16 km) from end to end and contains over 20 different types of alluvial soils. The area around the cities of Philo and Navarro, California in the center and north end of the valley receive considerably more cooling fog influence than the plantings closer to Boonville in the south. Despite being called a "valley", very few vineyards are planted on flat land. Much of the Anderson Valley is planted on a series of steep hills that range in elevation from 800–1,300 feet (240–400 m). On the mountain ridges above the valley, the cooling influence of the fog can not quite reach the vineyards planted at these elevations. The direct exposure to the sun gives these isolated patches of vineyards more warmth which contributes to the spicy, berry notes of the Zinfandels produced in this part of the Anderson Valley. While some of these vineyards are still part of the Anderson Valley, many were siphoned off into the boundaries of the Mendocino Ridge AVA when it was established in 1997. As a series of disparate mountain ridges, the Mendocino Ridge was the first non-contiguous AVA established in California.

=== Redwood, Potter and McDowell Valleys ===
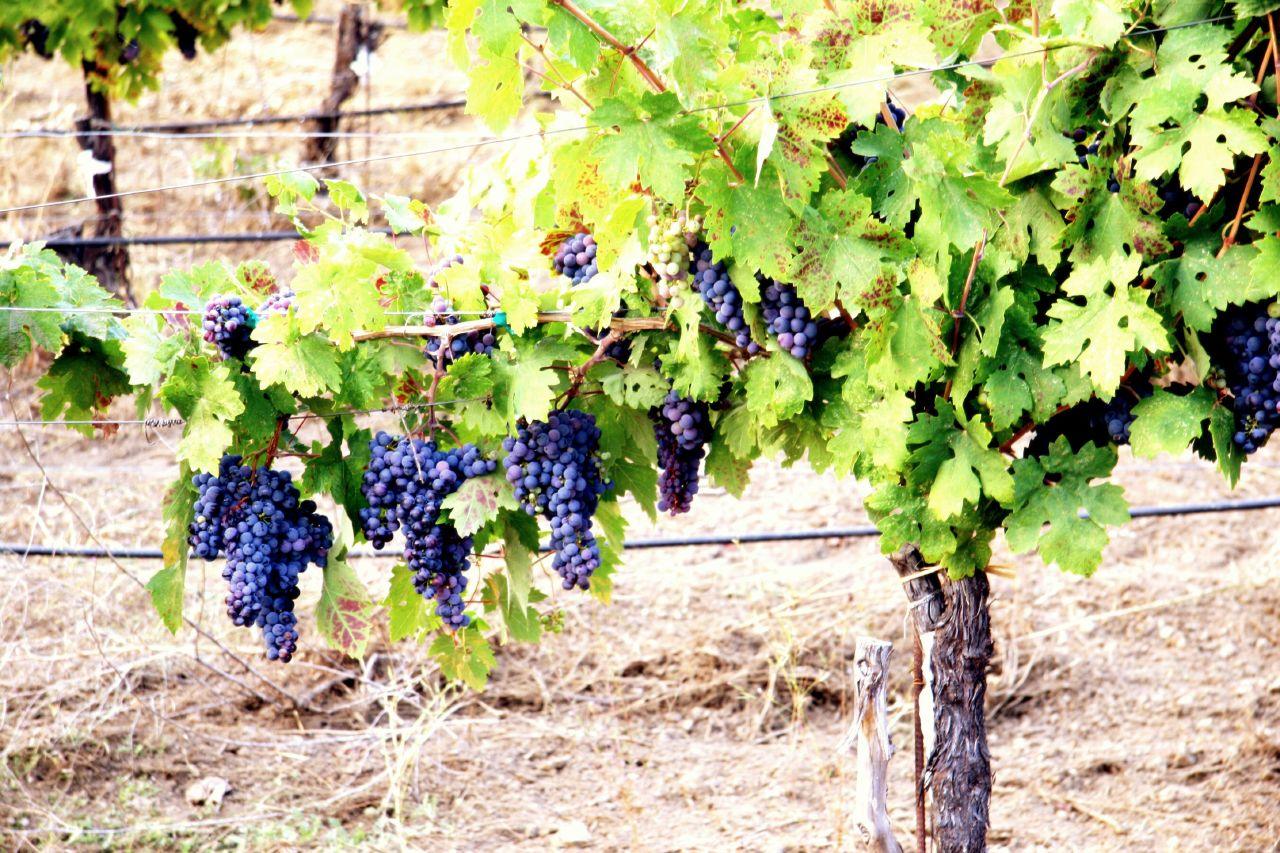
Grapes growing in the Redwood Valley

The Redwood and Potter Valleys face each other on the west and east, respectively, just north of Lake Mendocino in the far eastern reaches of Mendocino County. The areas include heavily wooden terrain with the name Redwood Valley coming from the legends of redwood trees growing so densely packed that they blotted out the sky. In the southern reaches of Redwood Valley is the Ricetti bench, a fluvial terrace the features crimson red soil, where Mendocino County's first vineyards were planted in the 1850s. Today the Redwood Valley is known for its peppery, spicy Zinfandels. The Redwood Valley is slightly cooler than the vineyard plantings to the south towards Ukiah, allowing the area to produce wines with more acidity and deeper color. Many of the grapes grown in the Potter Valley AVA are blended and sold under the more widely recognizable Mendocino AVA. In the 21st century, Potter Valley has developed a reputation for white grape varieties such as Chardonnay and Sauvignon blanc as well as Pinot noir from its pockets of cooler microclimates. In 2014, the area west of the Redwood and Potter Valley AVAs was designated the Eagle Peak Mendocino County AVA.

The McDowell Valley is located at the southeastern end of Mendocino County on a sloping plateau east of Hopland. Most of the soil is unsuitable for viticulture, with the most favorable areas confined to croppings of gravelly-loam soils at elevations of around 1,000 feet (300 meters) that are surrounded by the nearby Mayacamas Mountains. The McDowell Valley is known for its Rhone-style wines and features 100+ year old vines of Grenache and Syrah. This includes some of the oldest Syrah plantings in California, dating back to 1913, which today makes the McDowell Valley an active center into research into the clonal varieties of Syrah. In addition to producing still red wines, the wineries of the McDowell Valley are also noted for their dry rosés.

== Grape varieties ==
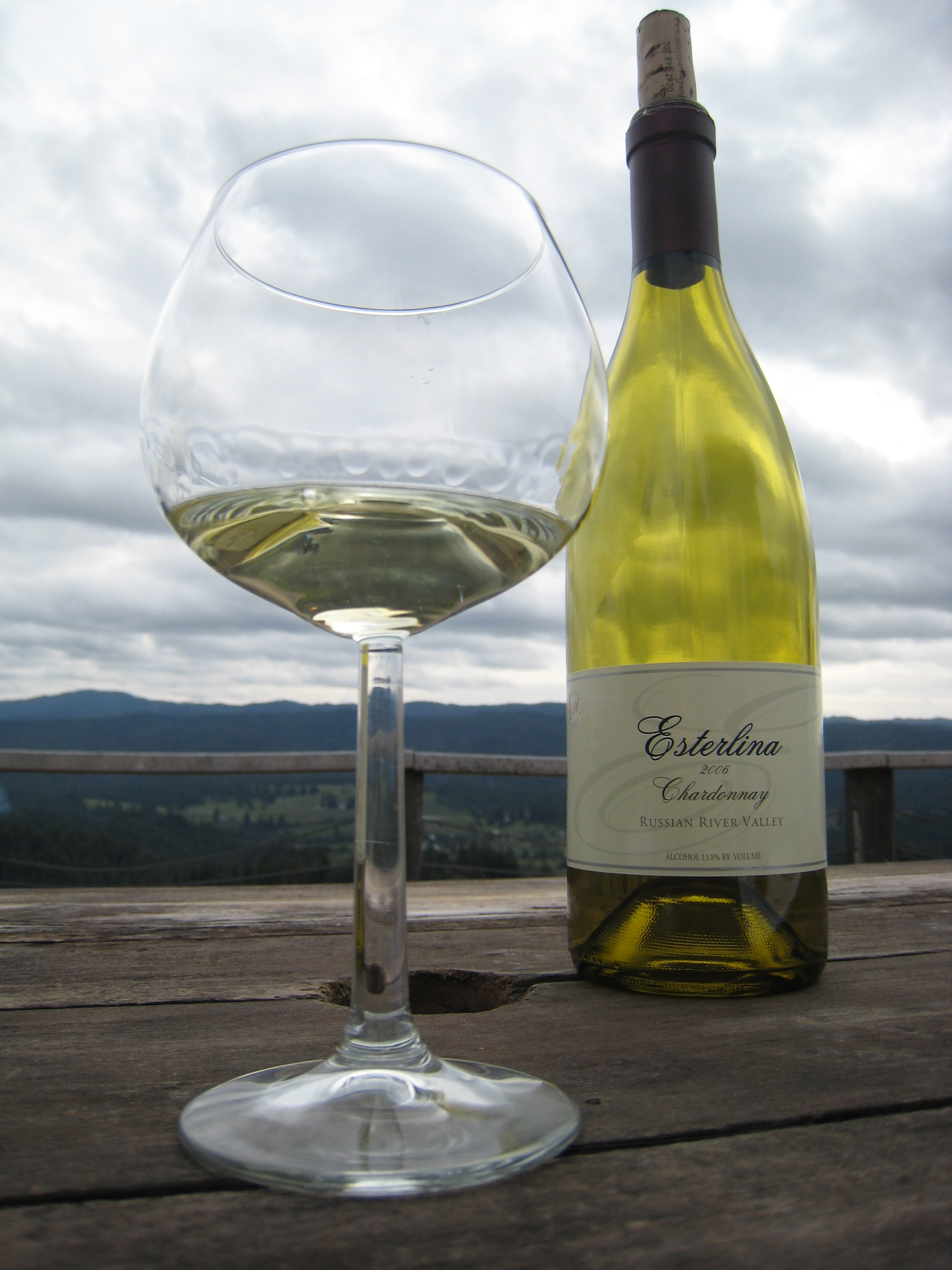
Chardonnay is Mendocino County's leading grape variety.

The climatic and geographical diversity of Mendocino county, allows the region to produce a wide range of grape varieties for wine production. The region harvest, on average, around 62,000 tons of grapes-representing about 2% of California's yearly crush. Chardonnay is the county's leading planting (2015) with about 4,800 acres (1,900 hectares) followed by Cabernet Sauvignon with 2,860 acres (1,160 hectares) and Pinot noir with 2,695 acres (1,091 hectares). In addition Barbera, Cabernet Franc, Carignane, Charbono, Chenin blanc, Gewürztraminer, Grenache, Malbec, Merlot, Muscat Canelli, Petit Verdot, Petite Sirah, Pinot blanc, Riesling, Roussanne, Sangiovese, Sauvignon blanc, Semillon, Syrah, Tocai Friulano, Viognier and Zinfandel are grown in Mendocino County.

== See also ==
- Lake County wine
- Napa County wine
- Sonoma County wine
- Wine Country (California)
