= Charlotte Millikin Hoak =

American horticulturist

Charlotte Milliken Hoak (1874–1967) was a 20th-century teacher, horticulturist, occasional botanist and garden columnist in Southern California. She advocated the use of native plants for landscaping public places including roadsides because they were best suited for the environment and did not draw on scarce water resources. As a teacher she taught organic gardening and composting techniques to her elementary school students and members of the community. Charlotte received recognition and awards from several plant societies, garden clubs, and well known botanists and horticulturists with whom she worked. Her contributions to the field of horticulture and her advocacy for the conservation of natural resources and preservation of wild-lands is documented and warrants recognition.

== Biography ==
Lottie May Hoak was born on October 24, 1874, to a pioneer son of a Maine farmer, in an area that was to become the town Comptche, California. To mark her birth, her father planted a grove of redwood trees which still stand today. Hoak became a devout student of nature and horticulture. She spent her first 17 years on her family's homestead in the heart of the redwood forest, helping her father plant his orchards and her mother beautify the yard with flowers and trees, ordered by mail, from all over the world. In 1883, when Hoak was 9 years old, her mother died but not before expressing her death-bed wish that her first daughter obtain an education at the University of California, Berkeley. In 1890, having graduated from the one-room schoolhouse near home, Hoak moved to San Jose, Ca. to earn a teachers certificate at the Normal school (now San Jose State University) there, then to Berkeley, to attend the University in 1896, fulfilling her mother's wish in 1900, when she was awarded a bachelor's degree in philosophy. The next few years were spent by Hoak interspersed between doing graduate work in botany at the university and teaching in Comptche and Mendocino, California. 1902 was tumultuous for Hoak as she gained her MA at Berkeley, continued teaching in Mendocino and her father sold her childhood homestead in Comptche, a place she remembered fondly in her writing, and visited, throughout her life.

One very formative aspect of Hoak's childhood in Comptche was the progressive manner in which her father, Newman Elvin Hoak, conducted his agricultural endeavors. His friends included Luther Burbank, internationally famous horticulturist, and Carl Purdy, noted botanist and nurseryman who were known to visit Newman together to hunt for game and to collect native plants in the area. Newman won awards at the state fair with, among other fruits and vegetables, his plums, grown from Burbank's grafts. Charlotte grew up placing a high value on the knowledge of farming practices, native plants and the environment, which were fundamental to her belief in the conservation of natural places and resources.

She had a long association with California Garden Clubs, Inc., serving as the inaugural Editor-in-Chief of Golden Gardens, the organization's publication, from October 1932 to 1935 and going on to become the organization's Horticulture Chairman. She was also the founding President of the South Pasadena Garden Club in 1926. The Charlotte M. Hoak Pygmy Forest near Comptche was donated to the State of California in her honor by California Garden Clubs in 1969. She was a regular columnist for the Pasadena Star-News.

She died on September 2, 1967 (aged 92).

== Recognition ==
- 1950 - Begonia "Charlotte Hoak" (originated by Mary Gillingwators) was named in Hoak's honor.
- 1956 - Eva Kenworthy Grey Award from the American Begonia Society for contributing original material toward helping the rank and file members further their study of begonias.
- 1958 - "Miss Horticulture"
- 1960 - The first "Horticulturist of the Year" award.
- 1969 - The Charlotte M. Hoak Pygmy Forest was dedicated on September 29, 1969.
- Honorary member of the Pasadena Horticulture Society (only men were eligible to become full members).
- Member of the Royal Horticultural Society of London.
- Member of the California Arboretum Foundation in Arcadia.
- Life member of the International Geranium Society.
