= Orrs Springs, California =

Unincorporated community in California, United States

Orrs Springs
- Unincorporated community
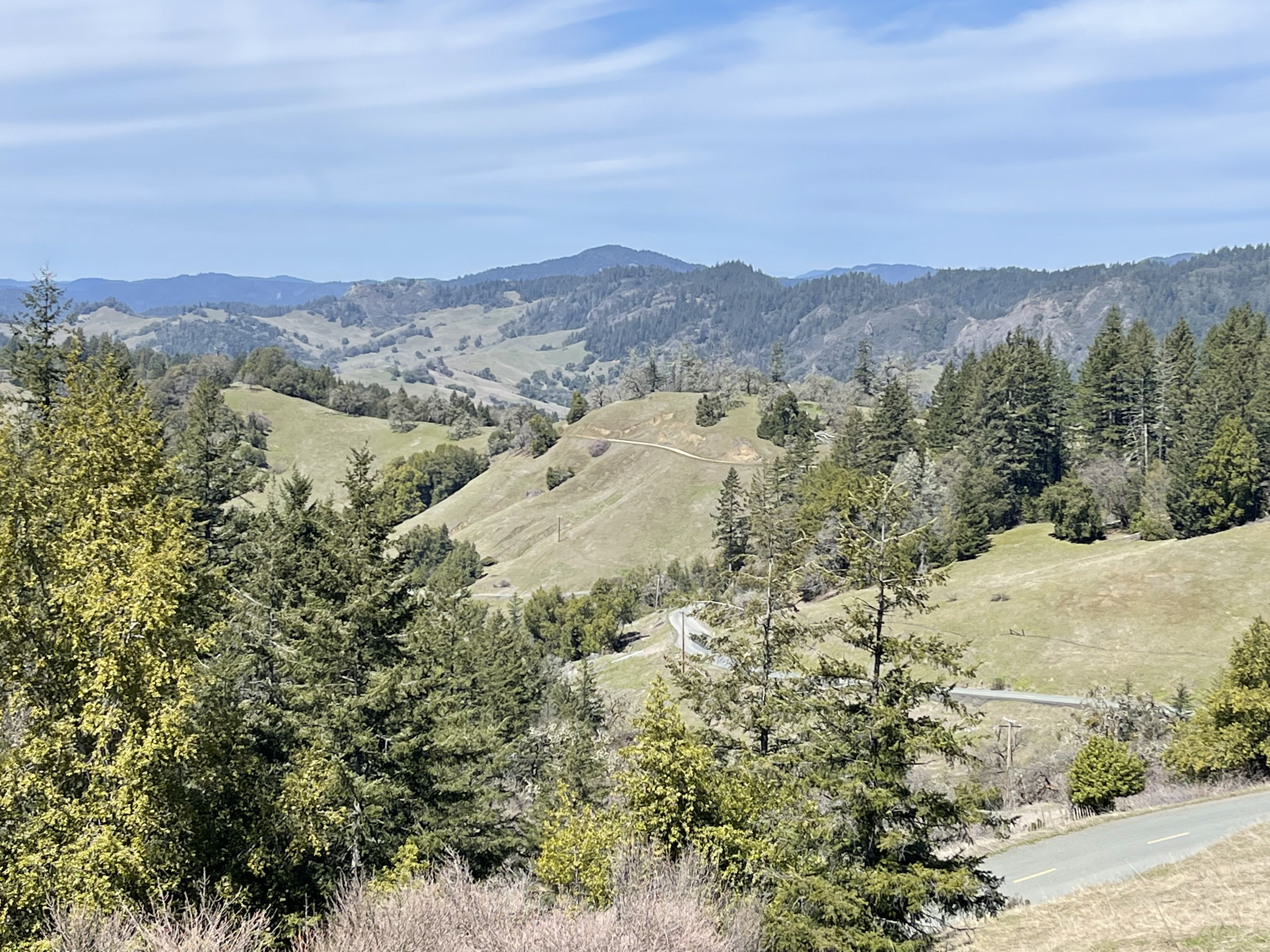
- Orrs Springs in 2023

- Location in California Orrs Springs (the United States)
- Coordinates: 39°13′46″N 123°21′53″W
- Country: United States
- State: California
- County: Mendocino
- Elevation: 1,001 ft (305 m)

Orrs Springs (formerly Orr's Hot Sulphur Springs and Orrs) is a set of springs around which grew a resort and a stagecoach station in Mendocino County, California, United States. It is located 15 miles (24 km) almost directly north of Boonville, at an elevation of 1001 feet (305 m). However, it is accessible from Ukiah by following Orr Springs Rd.

The Orrs post office operated from 1889 to 1911 and from 1915 to 1933. The name honored Samuel Orr, an early settler. Orr's son established a stage station and a resort that still exists as Orr Hot Springs Resort.
