= Redwood Valley AVA =

American Viticultural Area in Mendocino County, California

Coordinates: 39°17′45″N 123°12′18″W

Redwood Valley
- Wine region
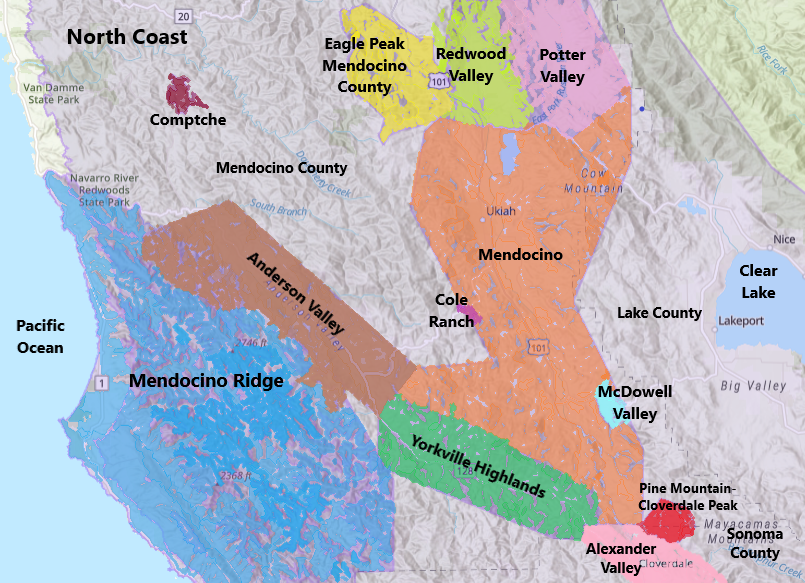
- Mendocino County AVAs
- Type: American Viticultural Area
- Year established: 1996; 2014 Amend
- Years of wine industry: 156
- Country: United States
- Part of: California, North Coast AVA, Mendocino County, Mendocino AVA
- Other regions in California, North Coast AVA, Mendocino County, Mendocino AVA: Anderson Valley AVA, Cole Ranch AVA, Covelo AVA, Dos Rios AVA, McDowell Valley AVA, Potter Valley AVA, Yorkville Highlands AVA
- Growing season: 197 days
- Climate region: Region II
- Heat units: 2,914 GDD units
- Precipitation (annual average): 39.62 inches (1,006 mm)
- Soil conditions: Redvine and Pinole Gravelly Loam soil series
- Total area: 22,400 acres (35 sq mi)
- Size of planted vineyards: 2,371 acres (960 ha)
- No. of vineyards: 66
- Grapes produced: Barbera, Cabernet Sauvignon, Carignane, Charbono, Chardonnay, Merlot, Petite Sirah, Pinot Noir, Sangiovese, Sauvignon Blanc, Syrah, Valdiguie, Viognier, Zinfandel
- No. of wineries: 16

Redwood Valley is an American Viticultural Area (AVA) located within the east central interior portion of Mendocino County, California centered around Redwood Valley. The wine appellation was established as the nation's 130^{th}, the state's 77^{th} and the county's seventh appellation on October 13, 1983 by the Bureau of Alcohol, Tobacco and Firearms (ATF), Treasury after reviewing a petition submitted by Mr. Timothy Buckner, prepared by Mr. Buckner, Mr. Jefferson Hinchliffe, Mr. Ulysses Lolonis, Mr. Rudolph H. Light and signed by 20 growers, winemakers, proposing a viticultural area within central Mendocino County known as "Redwood Valley." In addition, four letters of support for the area were received with the petition from growers and winemakers in the area.
The valley derives its name from the redwood trees that dominate the landscape. Some of the first vineyards were planted in Redwood Valley in the mid-19th century by Italian and Greek immigrants, although viticulture remained on a small scale up until the 1950s.

The arrival of a few large wineries and an increase in planting then led to an viticulture upsurge in the valley where, at one point, around half of all vines planted in Mendocino county could be found in Redwood Valley. The land sits at an elevation about 200 feet (61 m) higher than the surrounding area. It is cooler in climate and requires a later harvest for grapes to achieve ripeness.

In 2014, the 26,260-acre (41 sq mi) Eagle Peak Mendocino County AVA was established adjacent to Redwood Valley's western flank. Boundaries were realigned reducing the sizes of Redwood Valley AVA by approximately 1,430 acres (2 sq mi) and Mendocino AVA by 1,900 acres (3 sq mi) eliminating overlapping acreage with Eagle Peak Mendocino County's unique terroir.

== History ==
The area has been known as "Redwood Valley" for over a century. Some early settlers arrived here in the mid 1850s, and there was a thriving community by 1900. From as early as the 1870s, grape growing and wine making were an important part of the economy and culture of "Redwood Valley." One of the earliest published mentions of "Redwood Valley" as a grape growing region was in a March 7, 1913, article in the Ukiah Republican Press (1885-1954), which described "Redwood Valley" as "...admirably adapted for the grape and fruit land in Northern California." In the March 17, 1913 issue of the Ukiah Dispatch Democrat, the petitioner found the following article: The Redwood Valley Improvement Club Accomplishing Splendid Results By ConcentratedAction and Progressiveness, which stated as follows: "This is perhaps at the present time one of the most important industries of the valley, with hundreds of acres in vineyards and several important wineries in active operation, and because of the statements made *** by Professor Bioletti, the grape question has taken on a renewed activity. Redwood Valley grapes are exceptionally rich in sugar and are in demand because they raise the quality of wine. Much of the valley's product is contracted for over a term of years * * * (g)rapes produce splendidly on the bench lands of the valley, and because of the sunshine and climatic conditions mature and produce the ideal wine grapes." In the Santa Rosa Press Democrat, the petitioner found an article printed on July 31, 1949, and titled, "It's Howdy Neighbor To Calpella, Redwood Valley," by Mike Pardee. This article states that, "[a]pproximately half of Mendocino County's present grape acreage of 7,700 acres (3,116 ha) is in Redwood Valley. Farm Advisor R.D. Foote of Mendocino County said. "The Valley thus raised about half of the county's 17,000 short tons (15,422 t) produced last year (1948) * * *. Redwood Valley for years has been one of Mendocino County's most important farming sections. Its 314 families for the most part farmers * * * They'll tell you that those grapes make the finest wines in the region'."

== Terroir ==
=== Topography ===
The geography of the area sets it apart from surrounding areas in several respects. "Redwood Valley" is clearly defined by the ridges of the coastal mountain range that surrounds it and that the Valley floor slopes gently up in elevation from around 750 to 900 feet (229–274 m) above sea level. The mountain ridges rise steeply from the valley floor to over 3,350 feet (1,021 m) elevation. Most of the grapes are grown at an elevation between 750 and 1,500 feet (229 and 457 m) above sea level. At the south end of the valley the foothills close in from the east and west to form a narrowed throat through which the Russian River flows south. This narrowing is also where Highway 20 crosses the valley and the river to intersect with Highway 101. This combination of landforms provides a natural set of boundaries for the viticultural area. These features combine in several ways to produce growing conditions which distinguish the area from surrounding areas. The soils, as well as the micro-, meso-, and macro-climates are all factors that distinguish the viticultural area from surrounding areas.

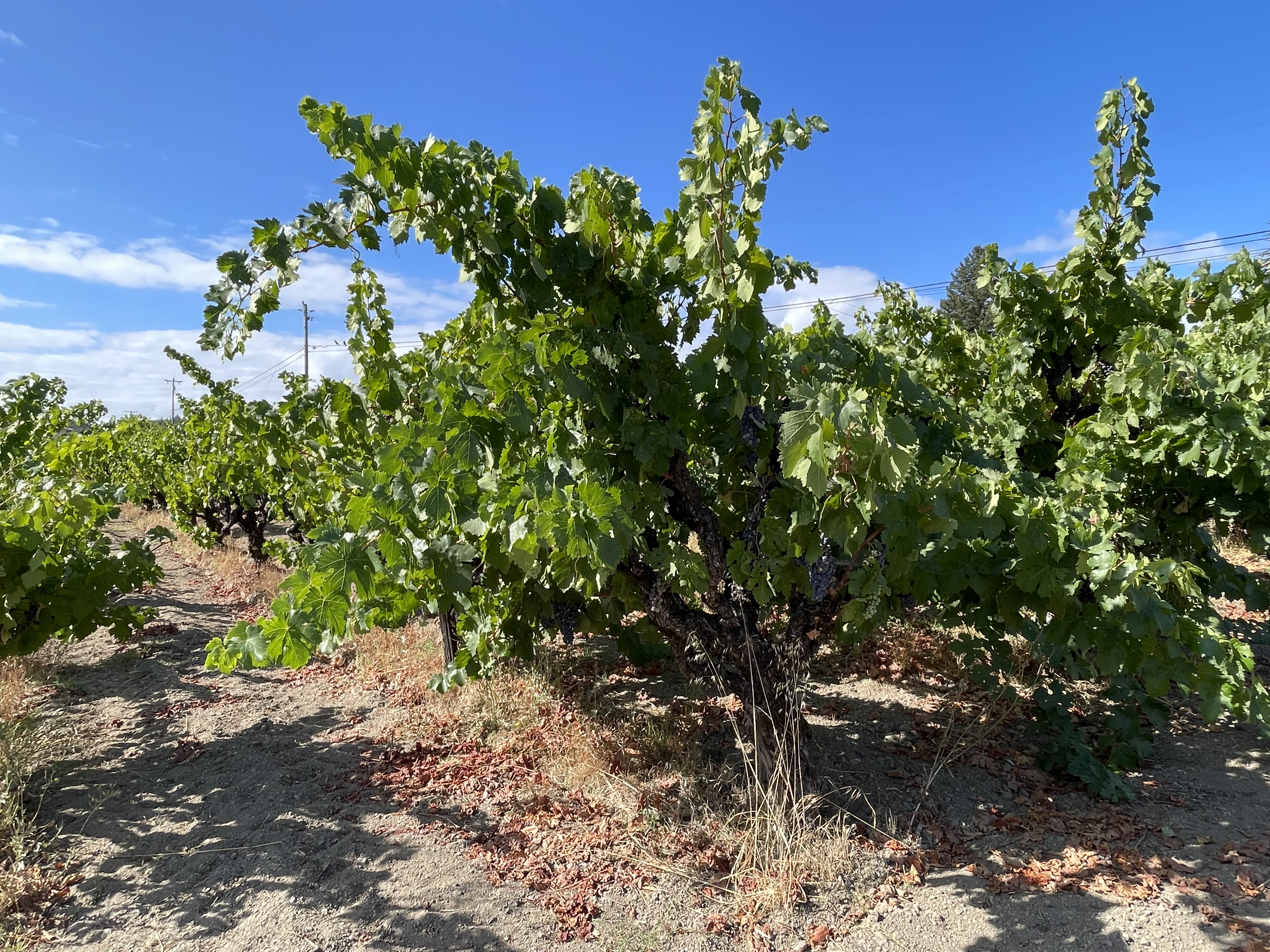
Old Carignane vine in Redwood Valley (2023)

=== Climate ===
One local winemaker, Jefferson Hinchliffe of Gabrielli Winery stated as follows about the way "Redwood Valley's" unique climate and soils manifest themselves in the wine: "I have been making wines from the many districts of Mendocino County for (t)en years. During that period I have developed a sense of what distinguishes the wines of Redwood Valley * * * The wines in general are of higher acidity and later maturity than of Ukiah Valley. The typical picking schedule for a given variety would begin with the Hopland-Sanel area, followed by Ukiah-Calpella, and then Redwood Valley. Comparisons with Potter Valley are based on fewer varieties since Potter Valley is planted mainly to early ripening Pinot and Chardonnay. Anderson Valley north of Boonville ripens later than Redwood Valley * * *. Acidity, color (especially in Pinot Noir), and phenolic content are higher in Redwood Valley than in adjacent regions. Higher temperatures in general lower phenolic content, color, and acidity * * *. Late ripening varieties can have difficulty ripening in Redwood Valley. Cabernet in general is able to tolerate the rain associated with the late season, but more fragile varieties such as Petite Sirah, Carignane, and Sangiovese can rot before ripening in heavier soils when bearing large crops. Conservative farming can produce stellar examples of these varieties * * *." Another wine maker, Jed Steele, of Steele Wines submitted a letter of support for the petition, in which he stated as follows. "[T]he REDWOOD VALLEY of Mendocino County is an excellent and singular grape growing region, certainly worthy of receiving a separate viticultural district designation * * *. It appears that REDWOOD VALLEY's particular climate allows for attaining many of the positive quality factors found in grapes grown in the cooler regions of Mendocino (Anderson Valley, etc.) as well as giving harvests that allow for more consistent maturity found in the more interior valleys (Potter Valley, etc.) of this county." In addition, the February 15, 1993 issue of The Wine Spectator, page 11, contains an article entitled "California's Redwood Valley Moves Out of the Shadows," by Robyn Bullard, which states as follows. "Wineries such as Fetzer, Weibel, and Frey have been in Redwood Valley for years, but now four more wineries have cropped up. The region boasts good soil and operating costs that are cheaper than other areas in Northern California * * *. Costs aside, Redwood Valley vineyards have long yielded quality grapes * * * Compared to the hot Ukiah Valley, Redwood Valley is much cooler. The area rarely gets fog, but the terrain and location allow ocean breezes-the same winds that cool Anderson Valley." There are a number of factors that make "Redwood Valley" climatically distinct. The petitioner provided a table listing the major agricultural areas of Mendocino County and their respective climatic region and number of degree days, as reflected in the SCS Soil Survey, 1991, pg. 4. Degree day figures for Anderson Valley were unavailable. The table indicates that "Redwood Valley" has 2,914 degree days and is the only Region II Climate in Mendocino County, factors that the petitioner states are significant. In support of this assertion, the petitioner cites the grape growing textbook General Viticulture, 1974, by Winkler et al., which he states contains the following excerpt: "Region II. An area of great importance. The valleys can produce most of the premium-quality and good standard white and red table wines of California. The less productive slopes and hillsides vineyards cannot compete in growing grapes for standard wines, because of lower yield, but, nevertheless, can produce favorable yields of fine wines." The petitioner states that, "(s)ince November of 1987, Light Vineyard of Redwood Valley (Latitude 39 degrees 18.32', Longitude 123 degrees 12.46', elevation 800') has maintained a U.S. Weather Bureau standard weather station including the following instruments: maximum/minimum thermometer, Belfort Recording Hygrothermograph, Belfort Recording Pyranograph, Totalizing Anemometer, Evaporation Pan, and Rain Gauge. Readings are taken daily, and data are transmitted monthly to the California Irrigation Management Information Service in Sacramento." Records from this station show that, in the most recent eight year period, the "Redwood Valley" received 22% more rainfall than the Ukiah Valley. The petitioner provided a table comparing the monthly totals for rainfall in "Redwood Valley" and Ukiah, for the eight year period for which they have maintained records. The table and charts were prepared from data gathered from the Light Vineyard Weather station which meets U.S. Weather Bureau standards. According to these records, the average total monthly rainfall in Ukiah Valley was 32.48 inches during the period of July through June compared to an average total of 39.62 inches for "Redwood Valley" during the same period. The petitioner also provided a graph comparing the annual rainfall values for "Redwood Valley" and Ukiah Valley averaged over a six year period. The graph indicates that the precipitation values for "Redwood Valley" were consistently higher than those for Ukiah Valley over the six year period measured. "Redwood Valley's" temperatures are several degrees lower in daily lows than Ukiah Valley. The petitioner states that, "(t)his accounts for the lower growing degree day totals in Redwood Valley and its placement in Region II. So, although Redwood Valley may reach daily high temperatures similar to the Ukiah area, because of cooler nights there remains a longer morning cool period." The petitioner also provided achart comparing monthly average temperatures for the two areas averaged over a six year period. This chart supports the petitioner's contentions regarding average maximum and minimum temperatures. The USDA plant hardiness zones range from 8b to 9b.

=== Soils ===
While all of the specific soil series that are found in "Redwood Valley" also exist in the surrounding areas, the proportions of the soils in "Redwood Valley" distinguish it from the surrounding areas. The Wine Regions of America, a book written by John J. Baxevanis in 1992, gives the following description of the Redwood Valley area. "Redwood Valley, the northernmost of the string of Russian River Valleys, lies (eight) miles north of Ukiah and Lake Mendocino on a series of higher terraces. Representing the birthplace of Mendocino winemaking, it is the home of some of the county's largest wineries. With more than 40 percent of the county's acreage, it is the most important of all the producing regions in the two county region [Lake and Mendocino]. A region II area, it produces above-average quality Zinfandel, Cabernet Sauvignon, Chardonnay, Petite Sirah, and Sauvignon Blanc. One of its elements of celebrity is the considerable quantity of Manzanita soil." The petitioner was unable to ascertain the origin of the term "Manzanita soil." However, he states that, "Redwood Valley does contain the largest deposit of the famous Redvine soil in the region and perhaps it is this to which Baxevanis refers."
The soils in the viticultural area have several unique features as determined by the U.S.D.A. Soil Conservation Service (SCS). The 1991 Soil Survey of Mendocino County, Eastern Part, and Trinity County, Southwestern Part, California, was used extensively by the petitioner to determine the identity and areas of soils for comparison. Whereas all of the specific soil series that are found in "Redwood Valley" occur in the surrounding area, it is the proportions in which they appear in "Redwood Valley" that are unique. "Redwood Valley" has by far the largest deposit of Redvine Series soil (#184-186 SCS Survey) in the area. Nearly one quarter of the viticultural area's plantable acreage is composed of soils of the Redvine Series. Potter Valley Viticultural Area to the east has no Redvine Series soils. The Calpella/Ukiah area to the south of "Redwood Valley" has a few small and isolated pockets of Redvine soils but their combined area amounts to less than 10% of the area covered by Redvine Series soils in "Redwood Valley." Another soil series that stands out, is the Pinole Gravelly Loam (#178-180 SCS Survey), which also occurs in the Potter Valley and Ukiah areas, but is a much smaller component of the area's overall composition. "Redwood Valley" has three times as much Pinole Gravelly Loam as either of these other two areas. This soil type makes up nearly a third of "Redwood Valley's" growing area. The Redvine and Pinole Gravelly Loam soil series comprise over half of the vineyard acreage of "Redwood Valley." The rest are an amalgam of six other types: Feliz, Pinnobie, Yokayo, Russian, Talmage, and Yokayo/Pinole/ Pinobie. These last six general types (plus traces of a few more types) evidence themselves in the neighboring areas in varying proportion, but all play a larger role elsewhere than they do in "Redwood Valley." The petitioner provided a table illustrating the proportions of soil types in the "Redwood Valley" area compared with the Ukiah/Calpella area. These figures were derived from SCS maps and soil descriptions, and were measured with a Compensating Polar Planimeter. The table indicates that, while "Redwood Valley" contains most of the same soil types as the Ukiah Valley, such soils are present in different quantities in the respective areas.

== See also ==
- Mendocino County wine
