= Cole Ranch AVA =

American Viticultural Area in Mendocino County, California

Coordinates: 39°03′41″N 123°13′17″W

Cole Ranch
- Wine region
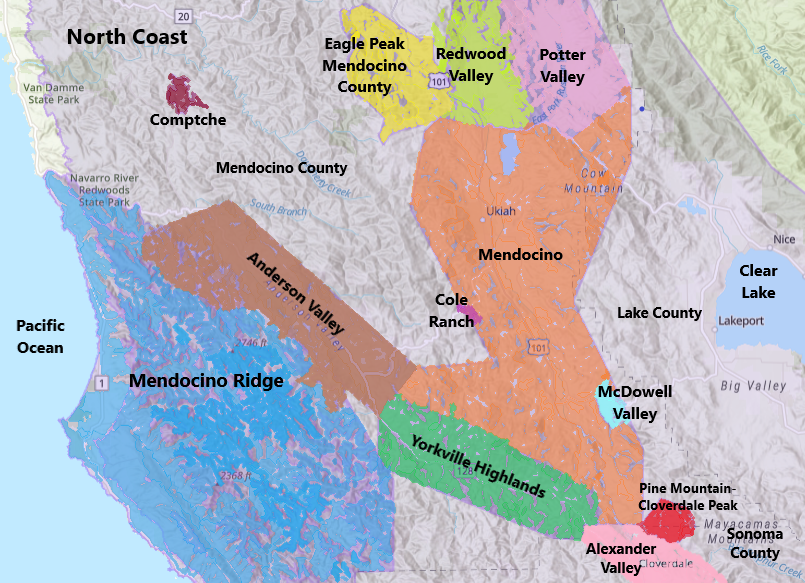
- Mendocino County AVAs
- Type: American Viticultural Area
- Year established: 1983
- Years of wine industry: 53
- Country: United States
- Part of: California, North Coast AVA, Mendocino County, Mendocino AVA
- Other regions in California, North Coast AVA, Mendocino County, Mendocino AVA: Anderson Valley AVA, Covelo AVA, Dos Rios AVA, McDowell Valley AVA, Potter Valley AVA, Redwood Valley AVA, Yorkville Highlands AVA
- Climate region: Region II
- Heat units: 2868 GDD units
- Precipitation (annual average): 40 to 45 in (1,016–1,143 mm)
- Soil conditions: deep, gravelly clay loam to shallow, gravelly silty clay
- Total area: 150 acres (0.23 sq mi)
- Size of planted vineyards: 60 acres (24 ha)
- No. of vineyards: 1
- Grapes produced: Cabernet Sauvignon, Merlot, Pinot noir, Riesling
- No. of wineries: 1

Cole Ranch is an American Viticultural Area (AVA) located in central Mendocino County, California. The diminutive appellation was established as the nation's 30^{th}, the state's nineteenth and the county's second AVA on April 15, 1983 by the Bureau of Alcohol, Tobacco and Firearms (ATF), Treasury after reviewing the petition submitted in 1981 by John and Barbara Cole, the owners of Cole Ranch in Ukiah, California, proposing a viticultural area in central Mendocino County named "Cole Ranch.”

Encompassing less than a 150 acres (0.23 sq mi), it is the smallest appellation in the United States, as of 2026. The viticultural area is located on a 500 acres (0.8 sq mi) ranch originally owned by the Cole family, in a small, narrow mountain valley between the town of Boonville to the west, and Highway 101 to the east. The small valley comprising the area has no name on a map. In viticultural circles, however, the area has become well-known by the name of "Cole Ranch," after the name of the property in which it primarily lies. The valley is approximately one mile (2 km) in length and a one-half mile (1 km) across at its widest point tucked into the high hills ranging from 1,400 to 1,600 feet (427–488 m) in elevation. The AVA is located between the Russian River and Anderson Valley.

In 1984, the 283,300-acre (443 sq mi) Mendocino AVA was established encompassing eight valleys including Anderson Valley, Potter Valley, Redwood Valley, Capella Valley, Ukiah Valley, Knights (McNab) Valley, Sanel Valley, and McDowell Valley, therefore, making Cole Ranch its sub-appellation.
Several prominent wineries source grapes from Cole Ranch including Fetzer Vineyards and Chateau St. Jean. Cabernet Sauvignon, Merlot Pinot Noir and Riesling are the most popular plantings. Cole Ranch is sub-appellation of Mendocino AVA. As of 2024, the Sterling family, proprietors of the Esterlina Winery located at Philo, owns the vineyard acreage.

== History ==
Although the viticultural history of the Cole Ranch is comparatively brief, it is a distinguished one. In 1971, Ohio native John Cole left his job at a real-estate firm, intrigued by the California wine boom of the early '70s. He attended UC Davis' studying enology where advisers suggested he hunt down vineyard opportunities on the North Coast. During a drive back from the Mendocino coastline, he saw the outlines of a worn-out 385-acre (0.6 sq mi) sheep ranch with virgin vineyard soils. A climate study was necessary and finding rootstock. It took two years before he planted 32 acres (13 ha) of Cabernet Sauvignon, 18 acres (7 ha) of Johannisberg Riesling and expanded in 1977 through 1981 with 11 acres (4 ha) of Chardonnay. Because irrigation could slow down the grapes' maturing process and seemed likely to delay what was already a late-ripening crop, Cole initially dry-farmed his plot with some limited irrigation later. The grapes found a ready market and warm reception from a growing list of wineries: Chateau St. Jean, Fetzer Vineyards, Parson's Creek Winery, Souverain Cellars, Navarro Winery, Husch Vineyards, Frei Brothers Winery and Dolan Vineyards, In 1999, the Sterling family, originally cattle ranchers and grape growers during the 1960s in the Central Valley and vineyard owners in the Russian river and Alexander Valleys, purchased Cole Ranch for $1.6 million.

== Terroir ==
=== Topography ===
Cole Ranch is isolated by topography from other grape-growing areas and is extremely limited in size by both topography and soils. The area is a tiny valley surrounded by the steep mountains of the Coastal Ranges. The nearest vineyard is one and a half miles (2 km) away and 800 feet (244 m) lower in elevation. ATF believes that the valley floor elevation of Cole Ranch at 1,400 feet (427 m) and its geographical location in a narrow coastal mountain valley 25 miles (40 km) from the Pacific Ocean gives the area a unique climate distinguishable from the surrounding areas.

=== Climate ===
Cole Ranch viticultural area is generally cooler than nearby grape-growing areas to the east, and warmer than those to the west. However, at the beginning and end of the growing season, Cole Ranch is cooler than surrounding areas both to the east and to the west. Thus the temperature pattern of Cole Ranch is unique. In addition, Cole Ranch receives on average more rainfall, normally 40 to 45 inches (1,016–1,143 mm), than the neighboring Ukiah area, normally 32 inches (813 mm)). The USDA plant hardiness zones range from 9a to 9b.

=== Soils ===
The soils of Cole Ranch range from deep gravelly clay loam to shallow, gravelly silty clay. Specific soil types identified by a soil survey conducted by the Soil Conservation Service of the U.S. Department of Agriculture are Cole Loam, Maxwell Variant Clay, Pinole Gravelly Loam, and Bearwallow Series Loam

== See also ==
- Mendocino County wine
