= Pine Mountain-Cloverdale Peak AVA =

American Viticultural Area in California

Coordinates: 38°52′02″N 122°56′08″W

Pine Mountain-Cloverdale Peak
- Wine region
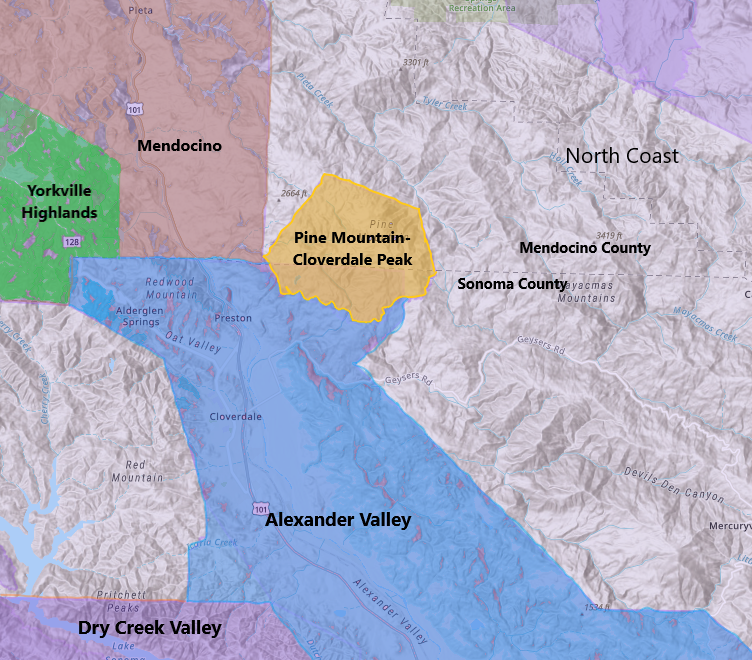
- Type: American Viticultural Area
- Year established: 2011
- Years of wine industry: 171
- Country: United States
- Part of: California, North Coast AVA, Mendocino County, Sonoma County
- Precipitation (annual average): 45 to 50 in (1,143–1,270 mm)
- Soil conditions: Fractured shale and weathered sandstone
- Total area: 4,570 acres (7 sq mi)
- Size of planted vineyards: 230 acres (93 ha)
- Varietals produced: Cabernet Sauvignon, Merlot, Cabernet Franc, Zinfandel, Chardonnay, Sauvignon Blanc
- No. of wineries: 1

Pine Mountain-Cloverdale Peak is an American Viticultural Area (AVA) straddling the borders of Mendocino and Sonoma County, California. It was established as the nation's 199^{th}, the state's 122^{nd}, Mendocino's twelfth and Sonoma's fourteenth appellation on October 27, 2011 by the Alcohol and Tobacco Tax and Trade Bureau (TTB), Treasury after reviewing the petition submitted by Sara Schorske of Compliance Service of America, on behalf of her and the local wine industry members, proposing the 4,570-acre (7 sq mi) Northern Californian viticultural area known as "Pine Mountain-Mayacmas." The area lies approximately 90 miles (145 km) north of San Francisco and five miles (8 km) north-northeast of Cloverdale, surrounding much of Pine Mountain, which rises to the east of Hwy 101 and the Russian River, to the north of that river's Big Sulphur Creek tributary, and to the immediate west of the Mayacmas Mountains. Approximately two-thirds of the proposed viticultural area lies in the southernmost portion of Mendocino County, with the remaining one-third located in the northern portion of Sonoma County. It is located at the top of Pine Mountain, at the Northern end of the Mayacamas Range, which separates the Napa and Sonoma growing regions. The AVA rises between 1,600 and 2,600 ft (488–792 m) making the area one of the most elevated grape growing regions in California. TTB determined, after public comments, that the "Mayacmas" portion of the proposed name could be misleading or confusing for consumers due to the length of the Mayacmas Range, which extends beyond the Pine Mountain region. After reviewing the public comments as well as the evidence provided in support of the alternate "Cloverdale Peak" name, TTB agreed that the proposed "Pine Mountain-Cloverdale Peak" name was appropriate for the viticultural area because it more accurately and specifically describes the location of the viticultural area.

== Terroir ==
The Pine Mountain-Cloverdale Peak appellation has rocky volcanic soils of steep hillsides and ancient alluvial fans. Soils are shallow to moderately deep fractured shale and sandstone, very well drained through gravels. In general, soils are less than 3 feet (0.91 m) deep, with over 50% at 12 inches (30 cm) or less.
On average, there is a twelve degree drop in temperature between the valley floor and the center of the Pine Mountain-Cloverdale Peak AVA. Despite the cooler days, growers on the mountain paradoxically experience relatively warmer night time temperatures, the result of cooler air dropping into the valley, displacing warm air upwards. At 1,600 feet (490 m), the valley also sits well above the fog that collects in the mornings and evenings down in the valley, giving it three to four more hours of sunlight a day. This unique microclimate creates an altered growing season for Pine Mountain growers, with bud break occurring two to three weeks after vineyards on the valley floor.

== History of Pine Mountain ==
The mountain is home to a number of natural springs, which were bottled and sold as a mineral water for over 50 years. Pine Mountain Spring water ceased production in the 1950s.
