= Eagle Peak Mendocino County AVA =

American Viticultural Area in Mendocino County, California

Coordinates: 39°16′33″N 123°15′24″W

Eagle Peak Mendocino County
- Wine region
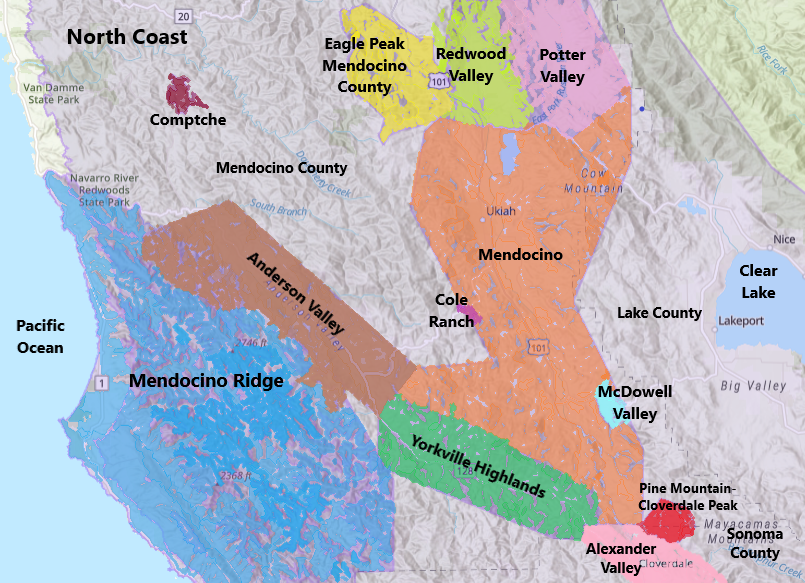
- Mendocino County AVAs
- Type: American Viticultural Area
- Year established: 2014
- Country: US
- Part of: California, Mendocino County, North Coast AVA
- Other regions in California, Mendocino County, North Coast AVA: Mendocino AVA, Redwood Valley AVA, Potter Valley AVA
- Climate region: Temperate
- Soil conditions: shallow, well-draining, coarse gravel, sandstone, clay, and loam mixes
- Total area: 26,260 acres (41 sq mi)
- Size of planted vineyards: 120 acres (49 ha)
- No. of vineyards: 16
- Grapes produced: Pinot noir
- No. of wineries: 1

Eagle Peak Mendocino County is an American Viticultural Area (AVA) located in northern Mendocino County, California about 125 miles (201 km) north of San Francisco, ten miles (16 km) north and slightly west of the nearest city, Ukiah and just south of the town, Ridge. It was established as the nation's 218^{th}, the state's 134^{th} and the county's thirteenth appellation on October 9, 2014 by the Alcohol and Tobacco Tax and Trade Bureau (TTB), Treasury after reviewing three petitions submitted by Mr. Ralph Jens Carter, on behalf of John Fetzer, Golden Vineyards, Lyndsey Vineyards, Masut Vineyards, Seabiscuit South Vineyards and Turan Vineyards, proposing the viticultural area "Eagle Peak Mendocino County" and two separate companion petitions proposing the modification of the boundaries of the existing "Mendocino" and "Redwood Valley" viticultural areas.

Eagle Peak Mendocino County lies within the North Coast AVA and takes its name from the nearby Eagle Peak summit covering the mountainous area situated in the Coastal Range just west of the Redwood Valley AVA and east of the V-shaped Mendocino AVA. The petitions were submitted and proposed in June 2013, designating the approximately 26,260-acre (41 sq mi) area which straddles U.S. Highway 101 between the towns of Ukiah and Willits. The new boundaries reduced about 1,430 and 1,900 acres (579 and 769 ha) from the bordering AVAs making the overlapping areas part of Eagle Peak Mendocino County.

== Terroir ==
Eagle Peak's steeply sloping terrain is significantly cooler than its neighbor, Redwood Valley, and the further eastern Potter Valley. However, Eagle Peak Mendocino County is still an inland AVA with elevations from 700 to 3,320 feet (213 to 1,012 m). It experiences more seasonal temperature variation than coastal AVAs with less fog. Persistent breezes of 5–10 mph travel from the ocean through the Big River airflow corridor. The soils are well-drained lacking water-holding capacity due to the slopes and shallow root depths because of hard subsoil. Primary soil associations are the Yorkville-Yorktree-Squawrock and Ornbaun-Zeni-Yellowhound. There is enough water-holding capacity to keep vines healthy from dormancy through fruit set, however, some irrigation is required to usher the vines through to harvest. The USDA plant hardiness zones range from 8b to 9b.

== Wine Industry ==
Pinot Noir grows best in Eagle Peak, as the temperature tends to be cooler than the inland valleys. The area is home to only one winery, Masút Vineyards and Winery, founded by third generation vintners and Mendocino-born Ben and Jake Fetzer. They submitted the Eagle Peak TTB appellation petition to define this little known, unique winegrowing area.
