= McDowell Valley AVA =

American Viticultural Area in Mendocino County, California

Coordinates: 39°58′35″N 123°03′21″W

McDowell Valley
- Wine region
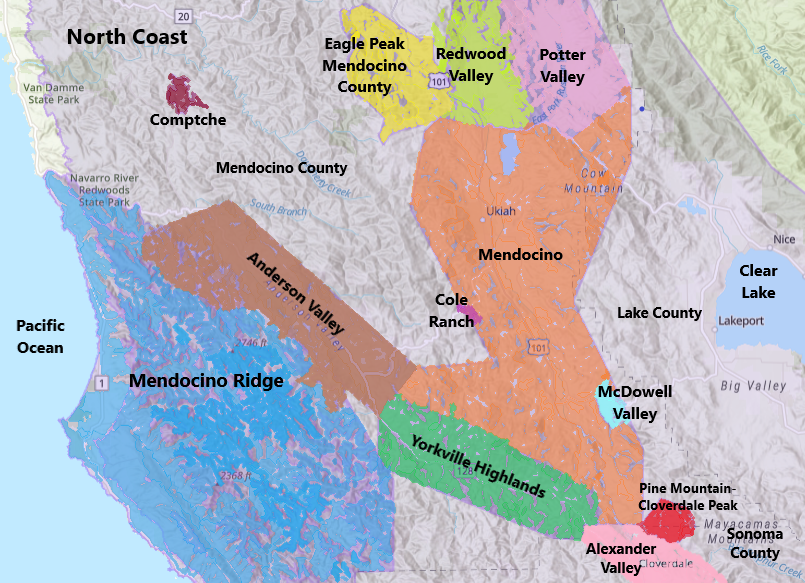
- Mendocino County AVAs
- Type: American Viticultural Area
- Year established: 1981
- Years of wine industry: 146
- Country: United States
- Part of: California, North Coast AVA, Mendocino County, Mendocino AVA
- Other regions in California, North Coast AVA, Mendocino County, Mendocino AVA: Anderson Valley AVA, Cole Ranch AVA, Covelo AVA, Dos Rios AVA, Potter Valley AVA, Redwood Valley AVA, Yorkville Highlands AVA
- Soil conditions: Alluvial of gravelly-loam types
- Total area: 1,483 acres (2.3 sq mi)
- Size of planted vineyards: 540 acres (219 ha)
- No. of vineyards: 12
- Grapes produced: Cabernet Sauvignon, Carignane, Chardonnay, Chenin Blanc, French Colombard, Grenache, Grenache Gris, Marsanne, Muscat Canelli, Petite Sirah, Roussane, Sauvignon Blanc, Semillon, Souzao, Syrah, Touriga Nacional, Viognier, Zinfandel
- No. of wineries: 1

McDowell Valley is an American Viticultural Area (AVA) located in southeastern Mendocino County, California situated four miles (6 km) east of the Sanel Valley near Hopland and Highway 101. It was established as the nation's seventh, the state's fifth and the county's initial appellation on December 4, 1981 by the Bureau of Alcohol, Tobacco and Firearms (ATF), Treasury after reviewing the petition submitted by Karen S Keehn, of the McDowell Valley Vineyards, Inc., on behalf of ten other growers within the boundaries of McDowell Valley, proposing a viticultural area named "McDowell Valley."
The approximately 1,483-acre (2.3 sq mi) valley sits on a sloped bench land at elevations as high as 1,000 feet (305 m) above sea level that overlook the Russian River to the west. McDowell Valley is slightly cooler than the surrounding areas in the county. McDowell Valley Vineyards is currently the only winery operating within the boundaries of the AVA with its emphasis placed on creating "America’s Best Syrah."

In 1984, the 283,300-acre (443 sq mi) Mendocino AVA was established encompassing eight valleys including Anderson Valley, Potter Valley, Redwood Valley, Capella Valley, Ukiah Valley, Knights (McNab) Valley, Sanel Valley, and McDowell Valley, therefore, making McDowell Valley its sub-appellation.

== History ==
Historical use of the name "McDowell" for the area dates from 1872. The name originated with an early settler, Paxton A. McDowell, who arrived in the area about 1852. From old Census records, it seems that McDowell came to California to pan for gold. Probably a farmer, when gold eluded him, he struck out on foot looking for farmland to homestead as did many other early settlers of Mendocino County. As part of the original Sanel Grant Mexican Governor Manuel Micheltorena to Fernando Feliz in 1844, McDowell Valley was either forfeited or sold by Feliz when his grant was tied up in the courts of California between 1844-56. On a sturdy handshake, Felix and McDowell struck a deal over 1,200 gold pieces for a section of land defined by how big of a loop one could ride a horse in one days' time. Portions of McDowell Valley were later purchased by Henry Willard, Jesse Daws, and W.E. Parsons by 1870. Willard sold a large part of his holdings to D.M. Burns, including the southern wing of McDowell Valley now known as Middleridge Vineyards owned by Mrs. Crellin Fitzgerald and nephew, Wendal Nicolaus. It was McDowell’s descendants however, the Buckman family, that first began cultivating wine grapes in the area; planting Syrah, Grenache, Carignane, and Petite Sirah beginning in the 1880s. According to "oldtimers", who were born and raised in McDowell Valley, grapes were planted as early as 1900, and probably as early as 1890, by W.E. Parsons on the western portion, by Benson on the eastern side, and by D.M. Burns on the southern finger of the valley. The vineyards were cultivated by horse-drawn plow, sulfuring was done by hand with gunnysacks, and as for frost protection.

A report in 1871 shows 25,000 grape vines planted in Mendocino County. By 1913, in an article entitled Grapes that Grow in Mendocino County, appeared the following:

Mendocino grapes are exceptionally rich in sugar and are in demand because they raise the quality of wine. Much of the county's product is contracted for over a term of years ... Zinfandel, the favorite, yields about three short tons (3 t) to the acre as early as four years; the yield from a mature vine yields almost twice that. Land between the valley floor and the hills is the best for grapes; this is plentiful at $10-25 an acre. The county has nine wineries with a capacity of 200 tons a day .... in 1910 the vineyard acreage was 5,800.

Included in this 5,800 acres (2,347 ha) of vineyard undoubtedly were acreage figures from McDowell Valley. According to "oldtimers", who were born and raised in McDowell Valley, grapes were planted as early as 1900, and probably as early as 1890, by W.E. Parsons on the western portion, by Benson on the eastern side, and by D.M. Burns on the southern finger of the valley. Winegrapes were planted on the Hopland Rancheria by 1920. After the 1980 plantings, Middleridge Vineyards of 160 acres (65 ha) in McDowell Valley, added to existing vineyards in production with future plans for virtually all of the plantable valley floor to be covered with winegrape vineyards. In this vineyard land with "permanent set" irrigation systems, now commands a price of $10,000 plus an acre, a long way from the $10-25 an acre of 1910. Grape varieties planted in the past were Alicante, Carignane, Golden Chasselas, Grenache, Mission, and Zinfandel. Varieties planted now are Chardonnay, Chenin Blanc, French Colombard, Grey Riesling, Muscat Canelli, Sauvignon Blanc, Semillon, Sylvaner, Grenache, Cabernet Sauvignon, Carignane, Petite Sirah, and Zinfandel. The largest holding planted to winegrapes now in production is 360 acres (146 ha) and 13 varieties owned by McDowell Valley Vineyards. Oldtimers have recalled that the wineries who purchased grapes from McDowell Valley were Asti, Frei Brothers, Petri, Sebastiani, and Simi, all Sonoma County wineries. All picking was done by the families who lived here and grapes were hauled to the wineries by horse and wagon or shipped south by rail at Hopland to the East Coast.

The ranch owned by W.E. Parsons is now known as McDowell Valley Vineyards, owned by Richard and Karen Keehn; the eastern portion known in the past as the Benson or Abert Ranch is now owned by Frank Hooper of Nevada. Parsons, Daws, and Willard were among the first patent holders of record in McDowell Valley. Other families who owned property in McDowell Valley between 1870-1960 included the Buckmans, Thompsons, Vassars, Salingers, MacFarland ("Candyman"), and Gummers. On the northwestern boundary of McDowell Valley is the Hopland Rancheria. Originally homesteaded by Jesse Daws, the Sanel branch of the Pomo Indian Tribe negotiated to purchase it in 1907 after their village site was purchased by a new property owner who no longer wanted them there. Presently owned by individual owners as tribal status was terminated in 1966, there are eleven parcels of land; six of those parcels currently have grapes planted on them. The present owners are Feliz, Buck, Poors, Burke, Daniels, and Ford. At the turn of the 20th century, a large redwood resort hotel with cabins was built on the east side of McDowell Valley near a natural soda water spring in McDowell Creek. It was dismantled by the mid-1940's. Freight wagons and passenger stages traversed the valley from Lake County to Hopland between 1890-1922. Gold was also mined for a period of time along McDowell Creek. Winegrapes were planted on the Hopland Rancheria by 1920. A 1916 publication, "Soil Survey of the Ukiah Area, California," prepared by the United States Department of Agriculture, refers to and describes McDowell Valley. The name is shown currently on the "Hopland Quadrangle California" 7.5 minute series USGS map. That map identifies the area which is the subject of this final rule. After evaluating the petition and the comments received, ATF believes that the McDowell Valley viticultural area has a unique historical identity and that the name "McDowell Valley" is the most appropriate name for the area.

== Terroir ==
=== Topography ===
McDowell Valley is a natural, sheltered valley. It is surrounded by mountain ranges, including some which rise sharply to elevations of over 2,500 feet (762 m) above sea level. The bench mark at the lower northwestern end of the valley is at 725 feet (221 m). The drainage from McDowell Valley passes out through a gorge cut in bedrock before it reaches the Little Sanel Valley and Hopland. McDowell Creek drains the valley and flows into the Russian River system. There is an upper elevation contour of 1,000 feet (305 m) around the valley which effectively contains an area of "gravelly-loam" alluvial soils. The surrounding slopes are composed of nonalluvial upland soils and unsuitable for vineyards. The valley has temperatures consistently warmer during the spring frost season and cooler during the summer growing season than most other Mendocino and Lake County areas surveyed by the National Weather Service between 1965 and 1978. ATF determined that due to the physical and climatological features of McDowell Valley it is distinguishable from the surrounding area. McDowell Creek flows through the gorge for approximately one-half mile (1 km) before emerging in Little Sanel Valley at approximately 600 feet (183 m) elevation. There is an upper elevation contour of 100 feet (30 m) around the valley which effectively contains an area of alluvial soils.

=== Climate ===
The valley has temperatures consistently warmer during the spring frost season and cooler-during the summer growing season than most other Mendocino and Lake County areas surveyed by the National Weather Service between 1965 and 1978. The USDA plant hardiness zones range from 9a to 9b.

=== Soils ===
The soils of McDowell Valley fall generally into alluvial soils of the “gravelly-loam" types, specifically Pinoli, Botella, San Ysidro, Conejo, and Talmage loams. These loams are gray to brown in color and the depth varies from 2 to 15 feet (1–5 m). The surrounding slopes are composed of nonalluvial upland soils. The soils were rated Class I & II as early as 1872 and 1874 by the Surveyor General 1s Office of San Francisco. Later soils analysis in 1971-1979 for McDowell Valley Vineyards show more types of soils. A.J. Winkler mentions that "high soils fertility is not so important as soil structure that favor extensive root development. On such soils, vine growth is less rank, and the ripening changes start earlier and proceed more slowly. At maturity, the fruit is firmer, of better balance, and has a rich, more pleasing aroma and flavor."

== Vitculture ==
The first winery to be built in McDowell Valley is McDowell Cellars (building began in 1979) which crushed nine varieties of winegrapes from McDowell Valley Vineyards in the 1979 harvest season. First bottlings of French Colombard, Chenin Blanc, and Grenache were in March, and first releases in May 1980. The owners of McDowell Valley Vineyards and Cellars built a 25,000 square feet (2,323 m^{2}) winery, believed to be the first solar winery in the world, which sources only grapes grown in McDowell Valley. Because of the passive and active solar design, conservation features of both water and energy, and the established quality of the wines made from its grapes, McDowell Valley made history for itself. Wineries who have purchased grapes from vineyards in McDowell Valley include Robert Mondavi, Stonegate, Charles Krug, Caymus, (Napa County), Sonoma Vineyards, Martini & Prati, Seghesio, Foppiano, Chateau Souverain, Geyser Peak, (Sonoma County), J.W. Port Works, Wine and the People (Bay Area), Concannon and Wente Brothers, (Livermore Valley), and Edmeades, Fetzer, and Parducci (Mendocino County).

== See also ==
- Mendocino County wine
