= Anderson Valley AVA =

Appellation that designates wine in Mendocino County, California

Coordinates: 39°05′14″N 123°27′21″W

Anderson Valley
- Wine region
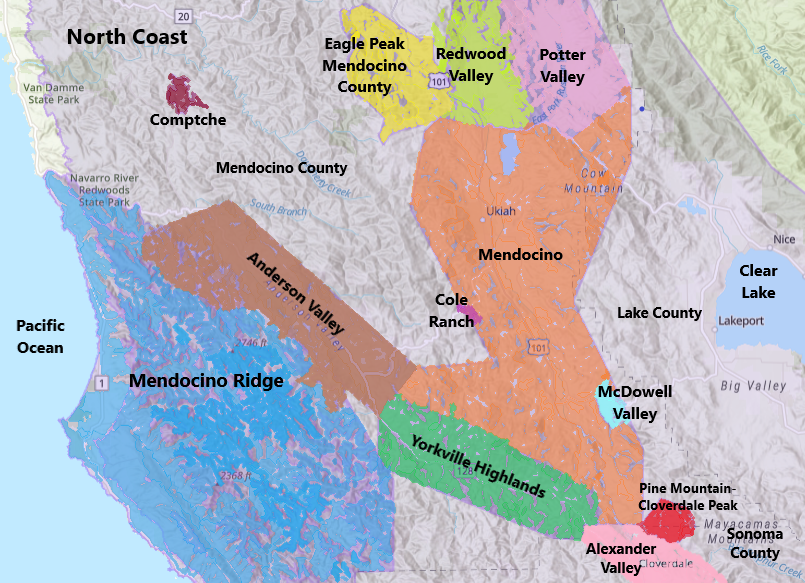
- Mendocino County AVAs
- Type: American Viticultural Area
- Year established: 1983
- Years of wine industry: 174
- Country: United States
- Part of: California, North Coast AVA, Mendocino County, Mendocino AVA
- Other regions in California, North Coast AVA, Mendocino County, Mendocino AVA: Cole Ranch AVA, Covelo AVA, Dos Rios AVA, McDowell Valley AVA, Potter Valley AVA, Redwood Valley AVA, Yorkville Highlands AVA
- Climate region: Region I- II
- Precipitation (annual average): 40.68 in (1,033 mm)
- Total area: 57,600 acres (90 sq mi)
- Size of planted vineyards: 2,457 acres (994 ha)
- No. of vineyards: 100+
- Grapes produced: Chardonnay, Gewurztraminer, Pinot blanc, Pinot gris, Pinot noir, Riesling, Sauvignon Blanc, Semillon, Syrah
- Varietals produced: Alsatian varietals, Sparkling wine
- No. of wineries: 28

Anderson Valley is an American Viticultural Area (AVA) located in the Anderson Valley landform within western Mendocino County, California lying generally along the watershed of the Navarro River. It was established as the nation's 35^{th}, the state's 23^{rd} and the county's third appellation on August 18, 1983 by the Bureau of Alcohol, Tobacco and Firearms (ATF), Treasury after reviewing the petition submitted by the Anderson Valley Appellation Committee, on behalf of area wine-growers, proposing a viticultural area to be named "Anderson Valley."

On June 15, 1984, the 283,300-acre (443 sq mi) Mendocino AVA was established encompassing eight valleys including Anderson Valley, Potter Valley, Redwood Valley, Capella Valley, Ukiah Valley, Knights (McNab) Valley, Sanel Valley, and McDowell Valley, therefore, designating Anderson Valley as its sub-appellation. As of 2025, the 57,600-acre (90 sq mi) appellation cultivates about 2,457 acres (994 ha) widely dispersed among 100 vineyards that source 28 wineries within its boundaries and 32 wineries outside of Anderson Valley. The viticultural area is known primarily for its Pinot Noir and sparkling wine production.

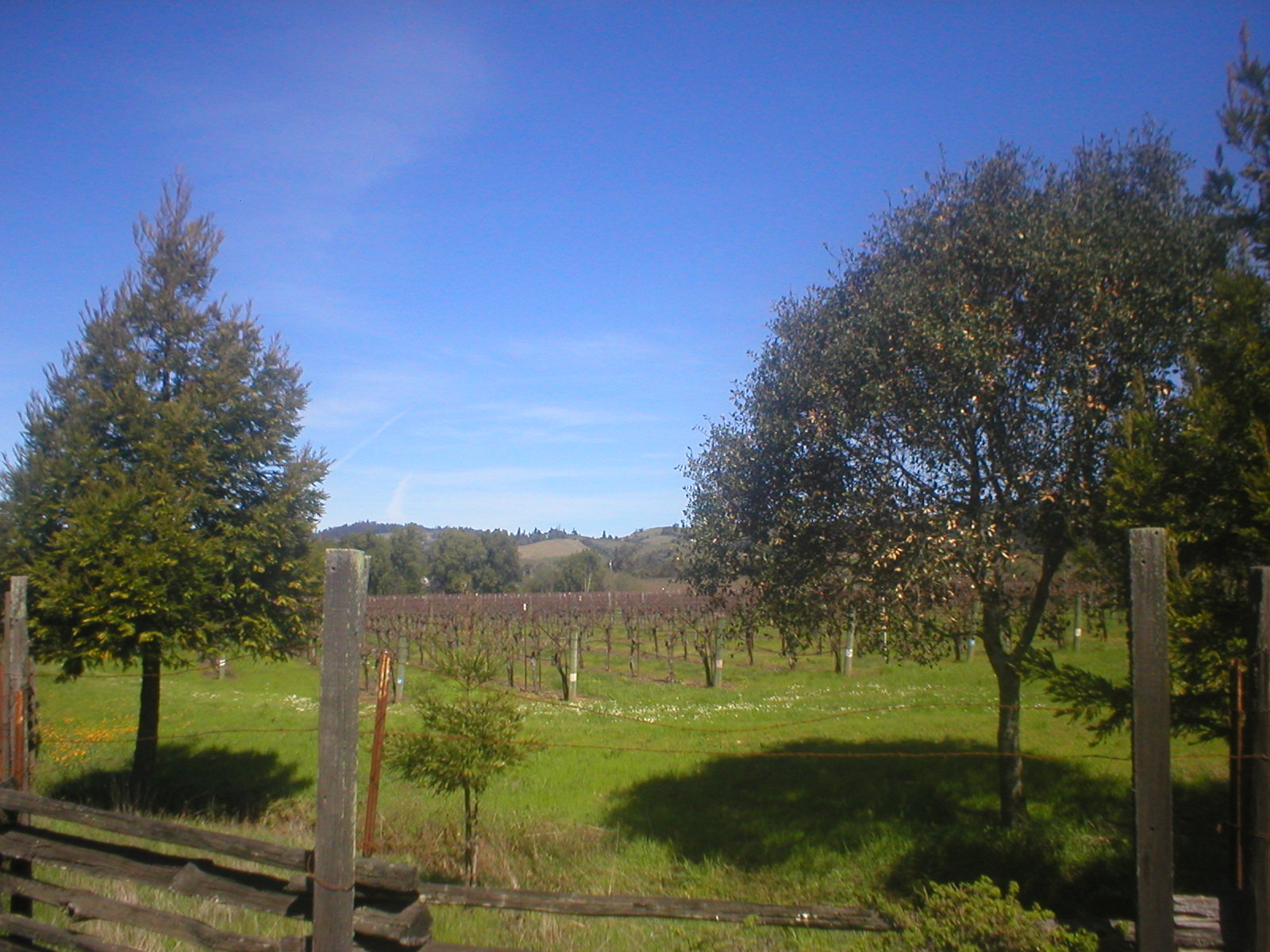
Anderson Valley Vineyard

== History ==
The valley has been known as Anderson Valley since shortly after it was first settled in 1852 by Walter Anderson when cultivation of the soil began. The area includes only the territory historically known as Anderson Valley and the surrounding slopes. Grapes were planted in the area shortly afterward. Grapes have been growing in the area since the earliest settlement, as described in the 1880 publication, History of Mendocino County, California.

Looking eastward, back over the track that he has just come, he sees the road winding, serpent-like, up the sides of the mountains, while at the base of the series of ridges lies the beautiful valley; its long, slender con-tour stretching, ribbon-like, for miles, dotted here and there with farm houses, and waving in emerald fields of growing grain, and here and there an orchard and vineyard.

There is documentation that some of the oldest, continuously producing vineyards date from 1922. Along Greenwood Ridge, numerous small vineyards dotted the area. One of these historic entities remains today, the DuPratt Vineyard, planted in 1916. The wine from the grapes of its vineyard was invited to the annual barrel tasting at the Four Seasons Restaurant in New York City.

The first Anderson Valley wineries to receive a bond for wine production include Husch Vineyards (BW-CA- 4558, 1971) followed by Edmeades Winery (BW-CA-4596, 1972) and Navarro Vineyards (BW-CA-4686,1976) . Lazy Creek (BW-CA-4883)Lazy Creek Vineyards and Greenwood Ridge (BW-CA-4960) followed in the early 1980s .

== Terroir ==
=== Topography ===
ATF determined that due to the topographic and climatic features of Anderson Valley, it is distinguishable from the surrounding areas. In a publication entitled Connoisseur's Guide to California Wine, the author states that "one of the most important of these (Mendocino County microclimates) will be Anderson Valley. This area is tucked into the mountains between Ukiah and the coast. The environment varies from a maritime climate, unsuitable for grape growing to a cool Region II climate on the University of California, Davis I-V heat accumulation scale. The portion of the valley shared by Edmeades and Husch Vineyards, near Philo, is one of the coolest grape growing areas in California. The Boonville area, six miles up Anderson Valley, edges into Region II heat accumulation."

=== Climate ===
The climate of the Anderson Valley viticultural area has been described as "Coastal" by the Mendocino County Farm Advisor's Office, in their booklet, The Climate of Mendocino County. In comparison, the climate in much of the other areas of Mendocino County is classified as "Transitional" due to the fact that either the coastal or the interior climates can dominate the Mendocino County climate for either short or long periods of time. The climate includes both Region I and Region II as classified by the University of California, Davis' system of heat summation by degree-days. A table of cumulative degree-days, published by the University of California Agricultural Extension Service Office in Lake, Mendocino, and Sonoma Counties, shows that the area around Philo is relatively cool and consequently is classified as Region I, whereas the area around Boonville is warmer and consequently is classified as Region II. In comparison the Ukiah area, which lies approximately 15 miles (24 km) to the northeast of Anderson Valley, is warmer and consequently is classified as a Region II and Region III area. The average rainfall of the Anderson Valley viticultural area, as recorded by the Boonville Department of Highway Maintenance and published in The Climate of Mendocino County, a booklet compiled by the Mendocino Farm Advisor's Office, is 40.68 inches (1,033 mm) annually. Most of the rainfall comes in the period from November through March. In comparison, the average rainfall per year for the Ukiah area to the northeast and the UC Research & Extension Center in Hopland to the southeast is 35.94 and 37.00 inches (913 and 940 mm), respectively. Situated 10 to 15 miles (16 to 24 km) from the Pacific Ocean, the AVA is prone to wide diurnal temperature variation between 40 and 50 °F (22 and 28 °C). The valley often has long Indian summers. The USDA plant hardiness zones range from 9a to 10a.

=== Soils ===
The bottom land soils in Anderson Valley are all either derived from old valley filling material, or more recent alluvial deposits. Maps of the area show the same series soils throughout the valley, with the more recent soil types in the majority. Anderson Valley bottom land soils include at least 24 different types.

== Viticulture ==
Wines from Anderson Valley are often favorably mentioned in many respected wine publications. At the outset, the four major varieties of grapes being grown in this area are Chardonnay (151 acres (61 ha)), Gewurztraminer (103 acres (42 ha)), Riesling (111 acres (45 ha)), and Pinot Noir (47 acres (19 ha)). This acreage information was obtained from the publication, 1981 Mendocino County Grape Acreage, published by the Mendocino County Farm Advisors Office. Currently, there are approximately 2,457 acres (994 ha) of grapes located within the viticultural area with major concentrations around the Boonville, Philo and Navarro locales. Although the number of acres of grapes under cultivation was small compared to the total size of the area, the scattered location of the grapes made it necessary to include the whole area. Wineries in the AVA host an annual Alsatian wine festival where locally produced Riesling and Gewurztraminer wines are showcased.

== See also ==
- Mendocino County wine
