= Potter Valley AVA =

American Viticultural Area in Mendocino County, California

Coordinates: 39°21′40″N 123°07′43″W

Potter Valley
- Wine region
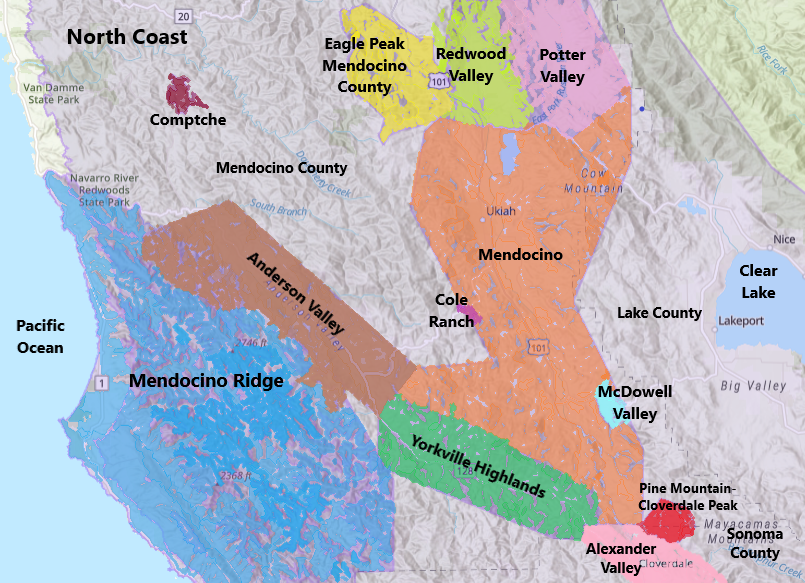
- Mendocino County AVAs
- Type: American Viticultural Area
- Year established: 1983
- Years of wine industry: 56
- Country: United States
- Part of: California, North Coast AVA, Mendocino County, Mendocino AVA
- Other regions in California, North Coast AVA, Mendocino County, Mendocino AVA: Anderson Valley AVA, Cole Ranch AVA, Covelo AVA, Dos Rios AVA, McDowell Valley AVA, Redwood Valley AVA, Yorkville Highlands AVA
- Growing season: 197 days
- Climate region: Region III
- Heat units: 3,139 GDD units
- Precipitation (annual average): 40–50 inches (1,016–1,270 mm)
- Total area: 27,000 acres (42 sq mi)
- Size of planted vineyards: 11,000 acres (4,452 ha)
- No. of vineyards: 6
- Grapes produced: Chardonnay, Gewurztraminer, Pinot Gris/Grigio, Pinot Noir, Riesling, Sauvignon Blanc, Semillon, Zinfandel
- Varietals produced: Rosé
- No. of wineries: 5

Potter Valley is an American Viticultural Area (AVA) within the Potter Valley landform located in east central Mendocino County, California centered around the town of Potter Valley. It was established as the nation's 28^{th}, the state's 31^{st} and the county's sixth appellation on October 13, 1983 by the Bureau of Alcohol, Tobacco and Firearms (ATF), Treasury after reviewing a petition submitted by The California Wine Company on behalf of local growers proposing a viticultural area in Mendocino County named "Potter Valley."

The petition was developed after a meeting of a majority of the growers who own or operate vineyards in the area. Nearly all other 12 growers in or near the area were contacted and no group or individual was found to be in opposition to the boundaries. Wine grape growers in Potter Valley emerged in the 1970s when Guinness McFadden planted his first vines. Todd Family Vineyards & Farms, Vecino Vineyards and a few smaller vineyards followed. There are approximately 11,000 acres (4,452 ha) of vineyards found in all parts of the area. This appellation is located to the east of the Redwood Valley AVA and sits at an elevation approximately 200 feet (61 m) higher than the surrounding areas. The proximity to the nearby Eel River watershed has created favorable conditions for the production of botrytized wines, particularly Chardonnay, Pinot Noir, Riesling, Sauvignon Blanc, and Semillon.

== Terroir ==
=== Topography ===
Potter Valley viticultural area is surrounded by mountains on all sides rising over 600 feet (183 m) in elevation from the valley floor. The floor of Potter Valley ranges in elevation from about 920 to 1,020 feet (280–311 m). The boundaries range into the mountainous areas surrounding the valley floor so as not to exclude small areas of tillable ground located in the surrounding hills. The rugged terrain of untillable ground in the surrounding mountains insures the separation of Potter Valley from other viticultural areas located within Mendocino County. The eastern boundary has been set to correspond with the Mendocino viticultural area. Specific boundaries of the viticultural area are based on U.S.G.S. maps with the boundaries prominently marked are on file with ATF. Soil maps and a publication on climate from the University of California Cooperative Extension Service.

=== Climate ===
Potter Valley is a valley surrounded by mountains with a transitional climate dominated at times by the coastal influence of the Pacific Ocean or by interior continental air masses. Potter Valley is classified as a Region III grape-growing area. The USDA plant hardiness zones range from 8b to 9b.

=== Soils ===
The soils of Potter Valley are primarily of Cole, San Ysidro, Botella and Pinole series while the nearby Redwood Valley is predominantly Noyo and Newton soils.

== See also ==
- Mendocino County wine
