= Yorkville Highlands AVA =

American Viticultural Area in Mendocino County, California

Coordinates: 38°53′42″N 123°12′35″W

Yorkville Highlands
- Wine region
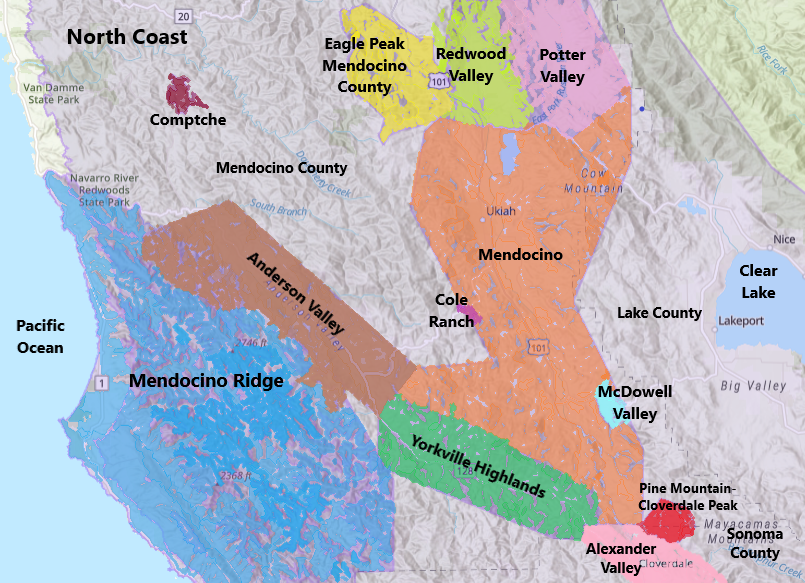
- Mendocino County AVAs
- Type: American Viticultural Area
- Year established: 1998
- Years of wine industry: 156
- Country: United States
- Part of: California, North Coast AVA, Mendocino County, Mendocino AVA
- Other regions in California, North Coast AVA, Mendocino County, Mendocino AVA: Anderson Valley AVA, Cole Ranch AVA, Covelo AVA, Dos Rios AVA, McDowell Valley AVA, Potter Valley AVA, Yorkville Highlands AVA
- Growing season: 260 days
- Climate region: Region II-III
- Heat units: 3,060 GDD units
- Precipitation (annual average): 50.55 inches (1,284 mm)
- Soil conditions: Redvine and Pinole Gravelly Loam soil series
- Total area: 40,000 acres (63 sq mi)
- Size of planted vineyards: 70 acres (28 ha)
- No. of vineyards: 12
- Grapes produced: Cabernet Franc, Cabernet Sauvignon, Carmenere, Chardonnay, Malbec, Merlot, Petit Verdot, Petite Sirah, Pinot noir, Primitivo, Sauvignon blanc, Semillon, Symphony, Syrah, Viognier, Zinfandel
- No. of wineries: 5

Yorkville Highlands is an American Viticultural Area (AVA) located in southern Mendocino County, California and is the county border between Sonoma's Alexander Valley AVA and Mendocino's Anderson Valley AVA. It was established as the nation's 133^{rd}, the state's 79^{th} and the county's ninth appellation on April 7, 1998 by the Bureau of Alcohol, Tobacco and Firearms (ATF), Treasury after reviewing a petition submitted by Mr. William J.A. Weir on behalf of the Yorkville Highlands Appellation Committee proposing a viticultural area within southern Mendocino County known as " Yorkville Highlands." In addition, a related petition was filed by Ms. Bernadette A. Byrne, Executive Director of the Mendocino Winegrowers Alliance proposing to extend the southern boundary of the Mendocino viticultural area to coincide with the Yorkville Highlands' boundary.
The petitions requested the Yorkville Highlands area be entirely contained within both the Mendocino AVA and the county borders. Yorkville Highlands covers approximately 40,000 acres (63 sq mi) of which 70 acres (28 ha) are devoted to viticulture. At the outset, there were seven growers and two wine producers within the area, with two new growers planning vineyards and some existing growers planning to plant more vineyards. The expansion of the Mendocino viticultural area adds approximately 10,000 acres (16 sq mi) to that area.
The soil in the Yorkville Highlands is rocky with a high gravel content, which provides excellent drainage. During the day, the climate is cooler than Alexander Valley but warmer than Anderson Valley, while at night the highlands are cooler than the surrounding areas. As of 2025, there are twelve growers and five wineries within the area.

== History ==
Camps and villages of Central Pomo people existed along the Rancheria Creek that flows into the Navarro River and to the sea. When European settlers arrived in the 18th century, they discovered the natural richness and quickly established homesteads, setting up sheep-grazing and farming operations which gained prominence. Extensive logging in the thick conifer forests of Coast redwood and Douglas fir soon followed. The area includes historic vineyards dating from 1914 which were decimated by the enactment of Prohibition. However, the logging industry had slowed By the mid-1970s and the modern viticulture industry took root in the Yorkville Highlands fertile soil.

== Terroir ==
=== Topography ===
Yorkville Highlands viticultural area lies generally along the headwaters of Dry Creek and Rancheria Creek. The vineyards in the Yorkville Highlands viticultural area are almost entirely above 800 feet (244 m) in elevation. The area is "a continuous string of high benches and land troughs bordered by even higher ridges with State Highway 128 running down the middle." The U.S.G.S. topographic maps show the area is a valley, with Highway 128 and the Rancheria and Dry Creeks running along the northwest-southeast axis. This center line of the area is the lowest part, at approximately 800 feet (244 m), and the highest, in the area near the northern boundary, is over 3,000 feet (914 m).

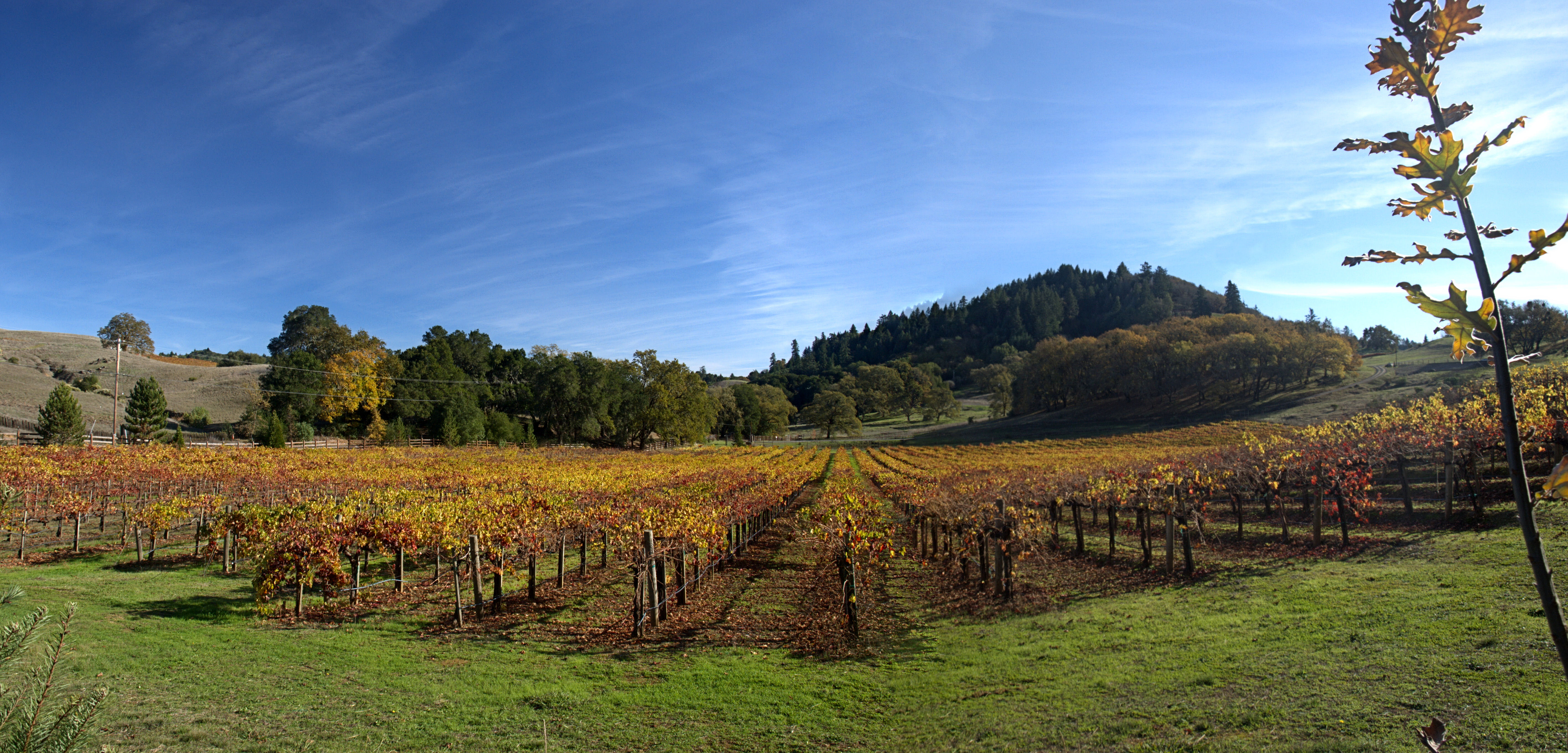
Vineyard along Highway 128 in the Yorkville Highlands

=== Climate ===
The Yorkville Highlands viticultural area climate is influenced by marine air well over 50 percent of the time. The petitioner described the climate as follows: "Almost every morning during the growing season, the moist marine fog is found on the high bench lands and land troughs which comprise the viticulture area and connect the cooler Anderson Valley with the much warmer Alexander Valley. The trees on these bench lands are draped with the moss from this ocean air invasion and cooler climatic condition." Unofficial heat summation data collected at the Weir Vineyards within the area reflects a four year average of 3,060, compared to approximately 2,500 in Boonville and Philo to the northwest of the viticultural area and 3,650 reported by the University of California Agricultural Extension Service in Cloverdale to the southeast. Average annual rainfall within the Yorkville Highlands area from 1961 through 1990, as measured by the Department of Water Resources, Eureka Flood Center at the Yorkville Station, was 50.55 inches (1,284 mm). The Anderson Valley, to the northwest, receives an average of only 40.7 inches (1,034 mm) of rain per year. The USDA plant hardiness zones range from 8b to 9b.

=== Soils ===
The soils in the Yorkville Highlands viticultural area are rocky hill soils characterized by gravel and old brittle rock. These generally thin soils found on the high benches and land troughs of the area stand in stark contrast to the generally very loamy clay soils found in the valleys and bottom lands dominating the neighboring approved viticultural areas. Soil types mapped by the U.S. Soil Conservation Service include: Bearwallow, Hellman, Cole Loam, Henneke, Montara, Hopland Loam, Squawrock, Witherell, Yorkville and Boontling. Only one or two of these soil types are found in common with a neighboring viticultural area.

== See also ==
- Mendocino County wine
