= Boont =

Boont can refer to a few different things:

- Boontling, the language spoken in Boonville, Northern California
- Boonville resident
- Boont ale from Boonville
