= Philo, California =

Philo
- Census-designated place
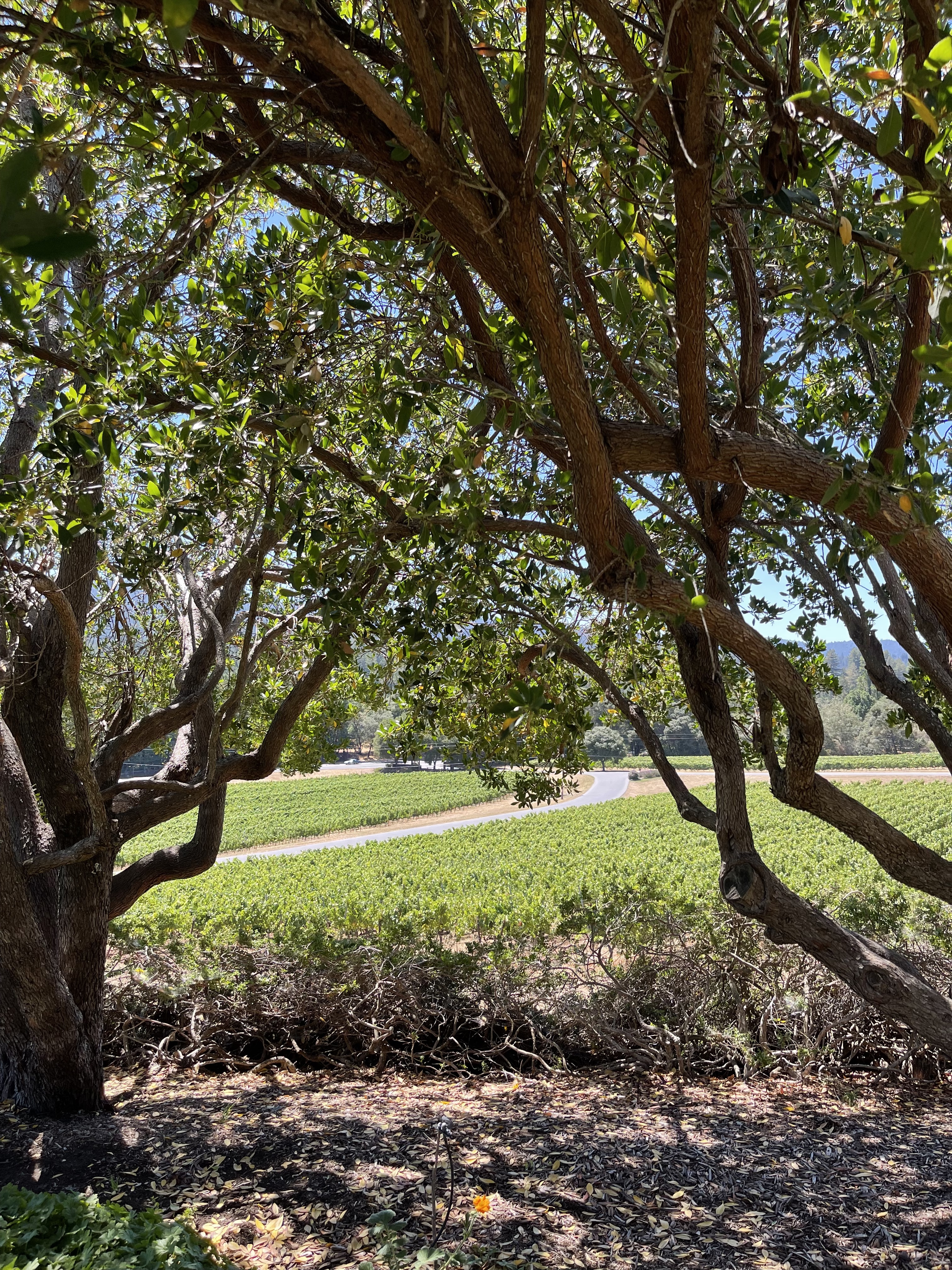
- Vineyards in Philo at Roederer Estate in 2022.

- Location within California Location within the United States
- Coordinates: 39°03′57″N 123°26′42″W
- Country: United States
- State: California
- County: Mendocino

Area
  - Total: 2.067 sq mi (5.35 km^{2})
  - Land: 2.067 sq mi (5.35 km^{2})
  - Water: 0 sq mi (0 km^{2}) 0%
- Elevation: 331 ft (101 m)

Population (2020)
  - Total: 319
  - Density: 154/sq mi (59.6/km^{2})
- Time zone: UTC-8 (Pacific (PST))
  - Summer (DST): UTC-7 (PDT)
- ZIP Code: 95466
- Area code: 707
- GNIS feature IDs: 1659380; 2628777

Philo is a census-designated place in Mendocino County, California, United States. It is located 6 miles (10 km) northwest of Boonville, at an elevation of 331 feet (101 m). The population was 319 at the 2020 census.

Philo is located in Anderson Valley in western Mendocino County. Situated along Indian Creek as it flows into the Navarro River, Philo is the home of KZYX, the local public radio station. Two small specialty lumber mills in Philo are all that remain of a once vigorous timber economy in Anderson Valley. Philo is the heart of the Anderson Valley wine region.

The first post office opened in 1888. The ZIP Code is 95466. The community is inside area code 707.

Two versions of how Philo was named are current: first, that its founder Cornelius Prather named it after his favorite female cousin; second, that he named it for his former home at Philo, Illinois.

== Geography ==
Philo is located at geographical coordinates 39° 3′ 57″ North, 123° 26′ 42″ West. California State Route 128 leads southeast (up the valley) 6 miles (10 km) to Boonville and northwest (downriver) 23 miles (37 km) to State Route 1 near Navarro Beach on the Pacific Ocean.

According to the United States Census Bureau, the CDP covers an area of 2.1 square miles (5.4 km^{2}), all land.

== Demographics ==
Historical population
Census	Pop.	Note	%±
2010	349		—
2020	319		−8.6%
U.S. Decennial Census; 1850–1870 1880-1890; 1900 1910 1920; 1930 1940 1950; 1960 1970 1980; 1990 2000 2010

Philo first appeared as a census designated place in the 2010 U.S. census.

The 2020 United States census reported that Philo had a population of 319. The population density was 154.3 inhabitants per square mile (59.6/km^{2}). The racial makeup of Philo was 110 (34.5%) White, 0 (0.0%) African American, 8 (2.5%) Native American, 0 (0.0%) Asian, 0 (0.0%) Pacific Islander, 107 (33.5%) from other races, and 94 (29.5%) from two or more races. Hispanic or Latino of any race were 209 persons (65.5%).

The whole population lived in households. There were 113 households, out of which 43 (38.1%) had children under the age of 18 living in them, 47 (41.6%) were married-couple households, 7 (6.2%) were cohabiting couple households, 16 (14.2%) had a female householder with no partner present, and 43 (38.1%) had a male householder with no partner present. 38 households (33.6%) were one person, and 12 (10.6%) were one person aged 65 or older. The average household size was 2.82. There were 66 families (58.4% of all households).

The age distribution was 68 people (21.3%) under the age of 18, 28 people (8.8%) aged 18 to 24, 92 people (28.8%) aged 25 to 44, 84 people (26.3%) aged 45 to 64, and 47 people (14.7%) who were 65 years of age or older. The median age was 39.8 years. For every 100 females, there were 151.2 males.

There were 129 housing units at an average density of 62.4 units per square mile (24.1 units/km^{2}), of which 113 (87.6%) were occupied. Of these, 53 (46.9%) were owner-occupied, and 60 (53.1%) were occupied by renters.

== Education ==
Students in Philo attend Anderson Valley Elementary School and Anderson Valley Junior-Senior High School. Both are operated by the Anderson Valley Unified School District and are located in Boonville.

== Notable people ==
- Bernice Bing, artist (died 1998)
- Sally Schmitt, restaurateur (died 2022)

== Politics ==
In the state legislature, Philo is in the 2nd senatorial district, represented by Democrat Mike McGuire, and the 2nd Assembly district, represented by Democrat Chris Rogers.

Federally, Philo is in California's 2nd congressional district, represented by Democrat Jared Huffman.

== See also ==
- Lazy Creek Vineyards
