= Zyzzyva (magazine) =

Triannual magazine of writers and artists

- Editor: Oscar Villalon
- Categories: Literary magazine
- Frequency: Triannually
- Publisher: Zyzzyva, Inc.
- Founder: Howard Junker
- Founded: 1985
- Country: United States
- Language: English
- Website: www.zyzzyva.org
- ISSN: 8756-5633

Zyzzyva is a triannual literary magazine based in San Francisco. It showcases established and emerging voices, including never before published writers. Launched in 1985 as a response to alleged East Coast bias against West Coast writers, the magazine still focuses on California writers, but has expanded to include national and international voices. ZYZZYVA's motto is "The Last Word," referring to "zyzzyva," the last word in the American Heritage Dictionary. A zyzzyva is an American weevil. The accent is on the first syllable.

The magazine features full-color prints in every issue. It has been described as "masterfully edited and sharply cerebral."

== Editors ==
The founder was Howard Junker. He retired from the magazine in 2010 and named Laura Cogan as editor-in-chief. In 2023, Managing Editor Oscar Villalon became editor-in-chief, the third editor in the publication's history.

== Awards ==
Work from the magazine has received the Pushcart Prize and the O. Henry Award and has been included in The Best American Short Stories and The Best American Nonrequired Reading.

ZYZZYVA won a Firecracker Award for Best Magazine in 2019; an AKO Caine Prize for African Writing awarded for a story published in 2021, and a Whiting Award in 2022.

== Notable contributors ==
Notable contributors include Haruki Murakami, Peter Orner, Kay Ryan, Lawrence Ferlinghetti, David Guterson, Tom Bissell, Tatjana Soli, Ron Carlson, Luis Alberto Urrea, Amy Hempel, D. A. Powell, Manuel Muñoz, Matthew Dickman, Herbert Gold, Daniel Sada, Adam Johnson, Karl Taro Greenfeld, Richard Misrach, Aimee Bender, Diego Enrique Osorno, Sherman Alexie, Daniel Handler, Adrienne Rich, Robert Hass, Czeslaw Milosz, Wanda Coleman, Raymond Carver, Tom Barbash, William T. Vollmann, Sandow Birk, Kate Folk, Lori Ostlund, Sean Gill, Fabián Martínez Siccardi, Dagoberto Gilb, Ed Ruscha, Richard Diebenkorn, Ursula K. Le Guin, Robert Creeley, Héctor Tobar, and M.F.K. Fisher.

== Novels ==
Boonville, by Robert Mailer Anderson was a "Zyzzyva First Novel," published in 2001 by the Creative Arts Book Company.

== See also ==
- List of literary magazines
