= Anderson Valley Advertiser =

Newspaper covering Mendocino County

- Type: Weekly newspaper
- Format: Broadsheet
- Owner: Bruce Anderson
- Founder: Eugene Jamison
- Founded: 1952
- Language: English
- Headquarters: Boonville, CA 95415; United States
- Website: theava.com

The Anderson Valley Advertiser is a newspaper covering Mendocino County. The paper was published weekly in broadsheet starting in the 1950s until 2024, when it went digital only. Under longtime publisher Bruce Anderson, the paper has achieved a cult status due to its controversial writing. The New York Times, Editor & Publisher, Newsweek, Los Angeles Times and The Irish Times have each profiled the paper.

== History ==
In 1952, Eugene Jamison published an eight-page brochure that was periodically mailed out to residents in the Anderson Valley. On January 25, 1955, this brochure was expanded into a weekly newspaper called the Anderson Valley Advertiser.

In 1984, Bruce Anderson purchased the paper. Anderson claimed to publish "the liveliest, most interesting county weekly anywhere." He penned a column called "Eyesore of the Week" critiquing local buildings or roadways, and in his editorials criticized everything from McDonald's chicken nuggets to county welfare programs.

In 2004, Anderson sold the paper to David Severn, a longtime contributing writer and hardware store clerk. Anderson then moved to Eugene, Oregon and launched a new publication called The Eugene AVA. The paper failed after three months. In 2007, Anderson reacquired the Advertiser in Boonville from Severn. In 2024, the Advertiser discontinued its print edition and went online only.

== Masthead ==
The old masthead in the print version billed the paper as "America's last newspaper." It featured mottoes borrowed from the French Revolution and the Industrial Workers of the World:

- Fanning the Flames of Discontent! (The IWW's Little Red Songbook is sub-titled "To Fan the Flames of Discontent")
- Peace to the Cottages! War on the Palaces! (The motto of Georg Büchner's Hessian Courier)
- All Happy - None Rich - None Poor

Various quotations are distributed throughout every issue of the paper. Examples include:

- "Be as radical as reality." - Lenin
- "Newspapers should have no friends." - Joseph Pulitzer

== Contributors ==
Contributors include:

- Robert Mailer Anderson
- Alexander Cockburn
- Jeffrey St. Clair
- John Jonik
- Flynn Washburne
