= Anderson Valley =

Region in Mendocino County, California

Coordinates: 39.06°N 123.43°W

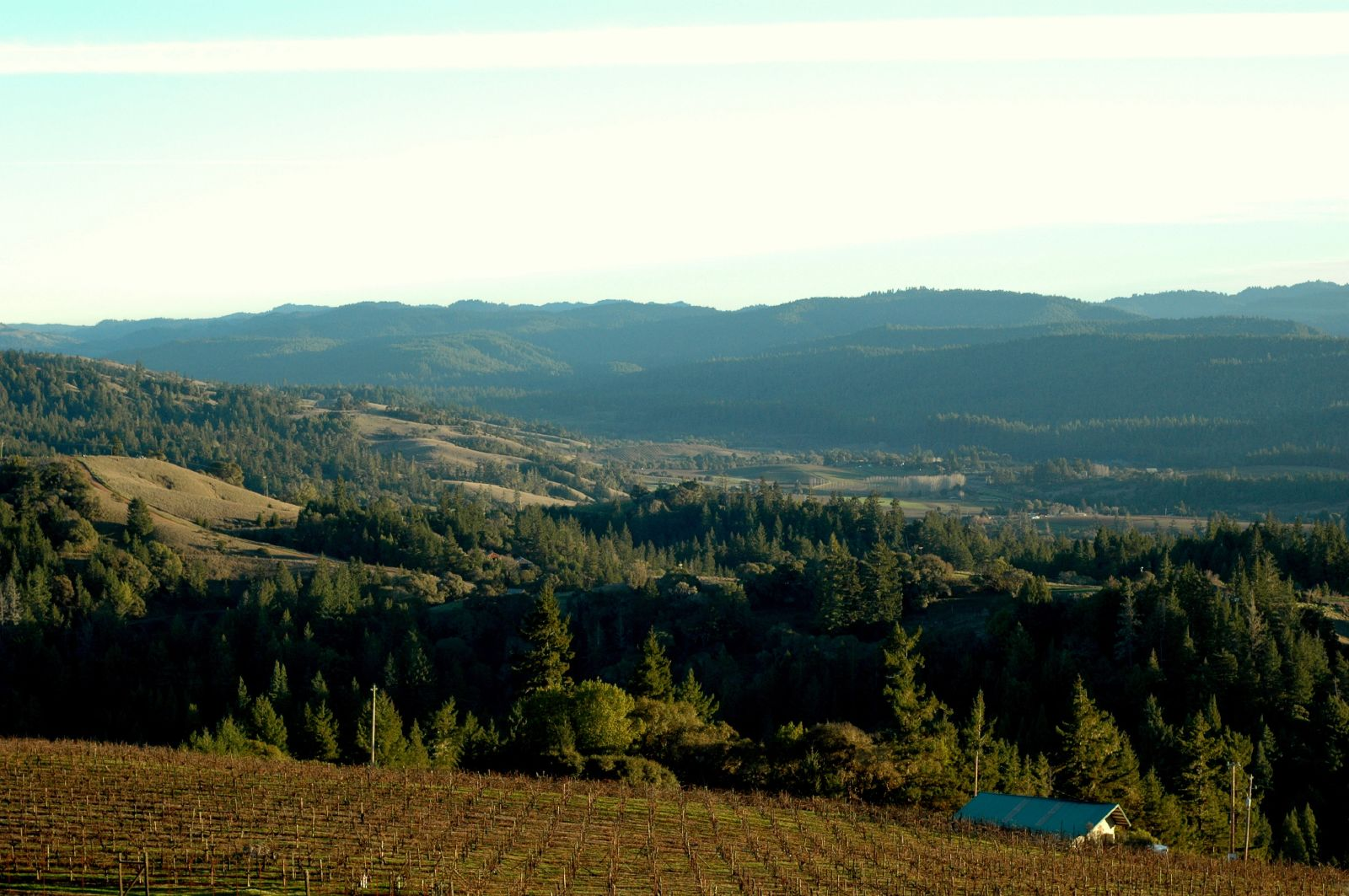
Anderson Valley, Mendocino County

Anderson Valley is a sparsely populated region in western Mendocino County in Northern California. Located approximately 100 miles (160 km) north of San Francisco, the name "Anderson Valley" applies broadly to several rural, unincorporated communities in or near the alluvial terraces along Anderson Creek and other tributaries to the Navarro River.

It is named after William Anderson, an early European settler to the area.

== Geography ==
The name "Anderson Valley" applies to a region stretching from Boonville (located on Anderson Creek) and Philo (located on Indian Creek) to Navarro (located on Soda Creek). Rancheria, Anderson, Indian and Soda creeks are tributaries to the Navarro River, which flows north and west through the coastal range to the Pacific Ocean; Dry Creek flows south into the Russian River watershed in Sonoma County. The main stem of the Navarro River begins less than a mile south of Philo at the confluence of Anderson Creek and Rancheria Creek. The mouth of the Navarro is 10 miles (16 km) south of Mendocino, California. Encompassing 315 square miles (820 km^{2}), the Navarro River watershed is the largest coastal basin in Mendocino County. The area is not seismically active, though a minor fault runs along the Valley floor.

The climate is tempered by cool marine air. Steep hills and mountains surround rolling to nearly level alluvial terraces. The dominant natural vegetation is a mixed forest of coast redwood, various native oak varieties, and Douglas fir. Elevation ranges from sea level to 2,500 feet (760 m). The average annual precipitation ranges 35 to 80 inches (890 to 2,030 mm). The average annual temperature is about 53 °F (12 °C), and the average frost-free season ranges from 220 to 365 days. Towards the coast the summers are cool and moist with frequent fog, while the interior Anderson Valley proper features a warm to hot summer climate similar to nearby interior regions, with daytime highs occasionally in excess of 100 °F (38 °C).

== History ==
Early Native inhabitants of Anderson Valley were speakers of two of the seven Pomoan languages. The Late Pomo of what is now the Yorkville area spoke the Central Pomo language. The Tabahtea (Tah-bah-tay) Pomo of the Boonville area west to Navarro spoke the Northern Pomo language. These residents occupied nineteen known village sites, with an estimated population of 600 in 1855.

The early European American settlers of Anderson Valley arrived after 1850. They practiced subsistence farming and expanded into resource extraction economies based on timber harvesting and livestock ranching. Some of the first European American settlers included Henry Beeson (who took part in the Bear Flag Revolt), his brother Isaac Beeson and William Anderson, their stepbrother, for whom the valley was named. The first wave of European American settlers included the Ornbaun, Hutsell, Barnett, Clow, Gschwend, McAbee, Rector, Horse, Burgess, Rawles, McGimsey, Witherell, Irish, Holgooden, Hiatt, Ball, Prather, Smelley, McSpadden, Wallace, Conrad, O'Barr, Bowen, Nunn, Vines, Buster, Farrer, Counts, Shields, Lawson, Williams, Donelly, Plaskett, Leonard, Hawkins, Stephens, Robinson, Tift, Perkins, Elliott, Ponad, Gasklii, Brayton, and Connard families.

John Gschwend established the first water powered lumber mill along the Navarro River in 1857, and Thomas Hiatt built the first steam powered lumber mill in 1877 near present-day Boonville. In 1880 a human population of around 1,000 maintained 75,000 head of sheep and 20,000 head of cattle. Commercial production of apples and hops began before the turn of the century, along with the development of Boontling, the local folk language. The 1940s and 1950s were boom years, when industrial automation and modern highway transportation enabled rapid liquidation logging of the remaining redwood forests. Many commercial lumber mills were established to work the brief timber boom.

By the 1960s the sheep, timber and apple sectors of the economy were in decline. Large tracts of land were removed from production and subdivided. The first commercial vineyards for wine grapes were planted. Marijuana production flourished with the influx of many new residents from the urban counterculture in the 1970s. By the 1980s the timber industry was reduced to two small specialty mills (lath and decorative fencing), the sheep industry to four working ranches of modest size, and the apple industry to a small fraction of its former planted area. In 1989 Sean Donovan of Boonville established KZYX, a community-based non-commercial, National Public Radio affiliated station.

=== Wine industry ===
A wine boom began in the 1980s, leading to the eventual establishment of the Anderson Valley AVA, specializing in Alsatian varietals, pinot noir and sparkling wine. The wine industry is currently the dominant contributor to the Anderson Valley economy, and major producers include Lazy Creek Vineyards and Roederer Estate. The major annual wine events are the Pinot Noir Festival held on the third weekend in May and the International Alsace Varietals Festival in late February. In addition to wine, there is a successful microbrewery, the Anderson Valley Brewing Company, on the outskirts of Boonville. Like much of Mendocino County, the hospitality industry is a natural adjunct to boutique alcohol production. Fine restaurants and quality lodging are in good supply. The pleasant natural environment and rural lifestyle attracts artists, writers, musicians and a variety of skilled crafts people. As in similar pastoral regions dependent upon a low-paid work force in the farm, hospitality and service sectors, degraded tenant housing is available for local employees, while upscale real estate inventory is generally priced beyond the typical household budget of resident unskilled laborers.

== Communities ==
- Boonville
- Navarro
- Philo
- Yorkville

== See also ==
- Anderson Valley Advertiser
- Anderson Valley Unified School District
