= Zero sum (disambiguation) =

Zero sum may refer to:

- Zero-sum game, a game or situation in which a participant's gain or loss is exactly balanced by the losses or gains of the other participants.
- Zero-sum problem,
- Zero-sum thinking,

== Things named zero-sum ==
- "Zero Sum" (The X-Files episode)
- Monthly Comic Zero Sum, a monthly shōjo manga published by Ichijinsha
- "Zero-Sum", a song by Nine Inch Nails from their 2007 album Year Zero
- "Zero Sum", a song by the Smile from their 2024 album Cutouts
- Zero Sum Game, a 2018 novel by S. L. Huang
- Zero-Sum: Stories, a 2023 collection of short stories by Joyce Carol Oates

== See also ==
- Empty sum
- Non Zero Sumness
- Zerosumfree monoid
