= Bruce Anderson (publisher) =

American newspaper publisher

Bruce Anderson is the publisher and editor of the Northern California newspaper, Anderson Valley Advertiser (AVA), which he purchased in 1984 for a sum of $20,000. The New York Times described the AVA as "the country's most idiosyncratic and contentious weeklies." Anderson is known for publishing some of the most interesting, well-researched journalism in Northern California.

Anderson received a baseball athletic scholarship to attend California Polytechnic State University in San Luis Obispo, but later transferred to San Francisco State where he earned a B.A. in English. Prior to purchasing the Anderson Valley Advertiser, Anderson served in the Marines, Peace Corps, and ran a home for juvenile delinquents. Anderson was a foster parent to American serial killer David Mason who was executed in San Quentin State Prison's gas chamber in 1993.

Anderson has been in jail numerous times, most notably for allegedly withholding evidence in the Bear Lincoln murder trial and for punching a superintendent at a school board meeting.

Anderson is married to Ling More, who he met in Borneo during his time in the Peace Corps. His son, Zack Anderson, is the co-writer of the films Pig Hunt and Windows on the World. Anderson is uncle to activist and American writer, Robert Mailer Anderson. In 2022, Bruce Anderson received a Reginald Lockett Lifetime Achievement Award from PEN Oakland.

Anderson is in poor health and has scaled back his involvement with the Anderson Valley Advertiser no longer publishing a physical newspaper and outsourcing most work to freelancers.
