= Anderson Valley Unified School District =

Public unified school district based in Boonville, Mendocino County, California (USA)

Address
- 12300 Anderson Valley Way Boonville, Mendocino County, California, 95415; United States
- Coordinates: 39.02923°N 123.38808°W

District information
- Type: Public unified school district
- Motto: "Empowering our Students to Succeed!"
- Grades: Preschool through Adult
- Established: 1900; 126 years ago
- President: Richard Browning
- Superintendent: Jim Snyder (2021–)
- Business administrator: Leigh Horsehop
- School board: Five trustees (four-year terms)
- Governing agency: California Department of Education
- Schools: Preschool: 1; Primary: 1; Secondary: 1; Continuation: 1; Adult: 1
- Budget: $13,171,000 (2022–23)
- NCES District ID: 0602730

Students and staff
- Students: 434 (2020–21)
- Faculty: 25.59 FTE (202–23)
- Staff: 38.61 FTE (2022–23)
- Student–teacher ratio: 14.93 (2022–23)

Other information
- State achievement test: California Assessment of Student Performance and Progress (2018 Report)
- Schedule: 180 days/year, M-F, August–June
- Website: www.avpanthers.org
- Location of main office (red map pin) within district boundaries (shown in green)

Anderson Valley Unified School District, a public school district based in Boonville, Mendocino County, California, provides compulsory public primary and secondary education in the entirety of the nearly 20 mile long Anderson Valley, from the Mendocino County line north of Cloverdale to White Gulch, six miles north of Navarro. The district has 2,863 residents and averages a total enrollment of over 400 students.

The district operates five schools, all of which are located (along with the district office) in Boonville.

== History ==
The first record of a school operating in the valley dates back to 1858, when parents in the community erected a one room log cabin on the site of the current California Department of Transportation maintenance station in Boonville (at PM 28.0 on State Highway 128) and collectively raised the sum of $150 to pay a teacher to operate it for three months.

== Demographics ==
The student population is 75% Hispanic, 23% White and 2% Other, with all students provided the opportunity to graduate biliterate and bilingual in English and Spanish.

== Schools ==
Anderson Valley Unified Schools
School name	Address	School Type	Course work	Enrollment
Anderson Valley Elementary	12300 Anderson Valley Way; Boonville, CA 95415	Primary	K–6^{th}	276
Anderson Valley Junior/ Senior High School	18200 Mountain View Road; Boonville, CA 95415	Secondary	7^{th}–12^{th}	226
Rancheria Continuation	12300 Anderson Valley Way; Boonville, CA 95415	Continuation	9^{th}–12^{th}	9
Anderson Valley Adult	12300 Anderson Valley Way; Boonville, CA 95415	Adult	English Conversation (basic & intermediate); U.S. Citizenship; GED; High School Equivalency; Spanish Literacy; Parent Education	N/R
Peachland State Preschool	12300 Anderson Valley Way; Boonville, CA 95415	Preschool	Early childhood education	N/R
* N/R = Not reported
