= Gose =

German beer type

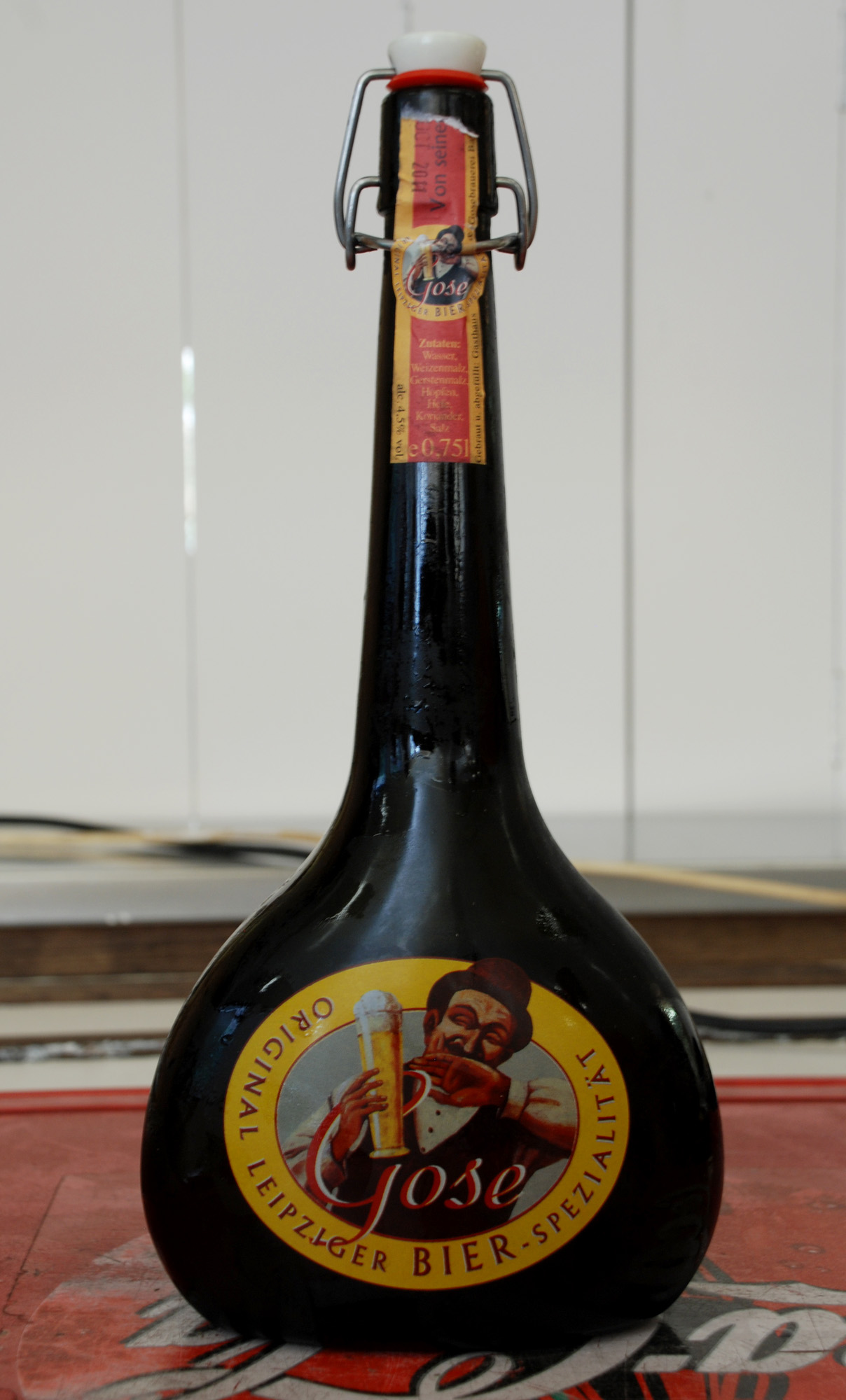
Traditional gose beer bottle produced in Leipzig, Germany

Gose (/ɡoʊzə/) is a warm fermented beer that is usually brewed with at least 50% of the grain bill being malted wheat (with the rest being malted barley such as Pilsner malt), fruit syrups – such as lemon and coriander – and salt – either added or as a component of the water used. It acquires its characteristic sourness through inoculation with Lactobacillus bacteria, which is not a hop-tolerant bacteria and which provides only a light acidity. Gose beers typically have very little hop aroma or bitterness (5-15 IBUs), limited malt flavour, and a relatively low alcohol content of 4 to 5% alcohol by volume. The predominant flavor is lactic acid, and the beers are strongly carbonated.

Gose was first brewed in Germany. It is not in accordance with the Reinheitsgebot (German purity laws) because of the use of coriander and salt, but it is allowed an exemption on the grounds of being a regional specialty.

Gose has similarities with Berliner Weisse, which is also sour, and Belgian witbier, which also has coriander.

Since 2016, Leipzig, where the beer was popular for centuries, has celebrated Happy Gose Day annually on November 17th.

== History ==
Gose was first brewed in between 1181 and 1470 in the town of Goslar, from which its name derives. It became so popular in Leipzig that local breweries were brewing it there by 1738. Gose was a staple drink in much of Lower Saxony for centuries.

Originally, gose was spontaneously fermented. A description in 1740 stated, "Die Gose stellt sich selber ohne Zutuung Hefe oder Gest" ("Gose ferments itself without the addition of yeast"). Gose was delivered, still actively fermenting, in casks to the taverns. Casks were stored in the cellar with the tap bung closed but the shive hole left open which allows some gas to escape, so that the carbon dioxide (CO_{2})—a by-product of fermentation from the still-active yeast—could escape. When fermentation had slowed to a point where no CO_{2} was emerging, the gose was ready to bottle. The barrel was emptied into a tank, whence it was filled into traditional long-necked bottles. These were not closed with a cap or cork, but with a plug of yeast (flor) which naturally rose up the neck as the secondary fermentation continued.

In 1824, Johann Gottlieb Goedecke began brewing gose at a manor house (rittergut) in Döllnitz. By 1900, it was considered to be local to Leipzig and there were over 80 gose taverns in the city.

At the start of World War II, due to a food shortage, grain in Germany was allocated to bread making. The Rittergutsbrauerei Döllnitz, between Merseburg and Halle, was the last brewery producing gose. When it was nationalised and closed in 1945, gose disappeared temporarily. In 1949, Friedrich Wurzler, who had worked at the Döllnitz brewery and knew the techniques for brewing gose, opened a tiny brewery in Leipzig. Before his death in the late 1950s, Wurzler passed the recipe to his stepson, Guido Pfnister. When Pfnister died in 1966, the brewery closed and gose production again ceased.

In the 1980s, Lothar Goldhahn restored a former gose tavern and added gose to the menu, convincing the Schultheiss Berliner-Weisse-Brauerei on Schönhauser Allee in East Berlin produce the beer. He gave up the bar in 1990 and it closed in 1995. However, in 1999, Tilo Jänichen teamed up with the son of the last owner of Döllnitz Manor and modified the original gose recipe for his brewery.

== Major producers ==
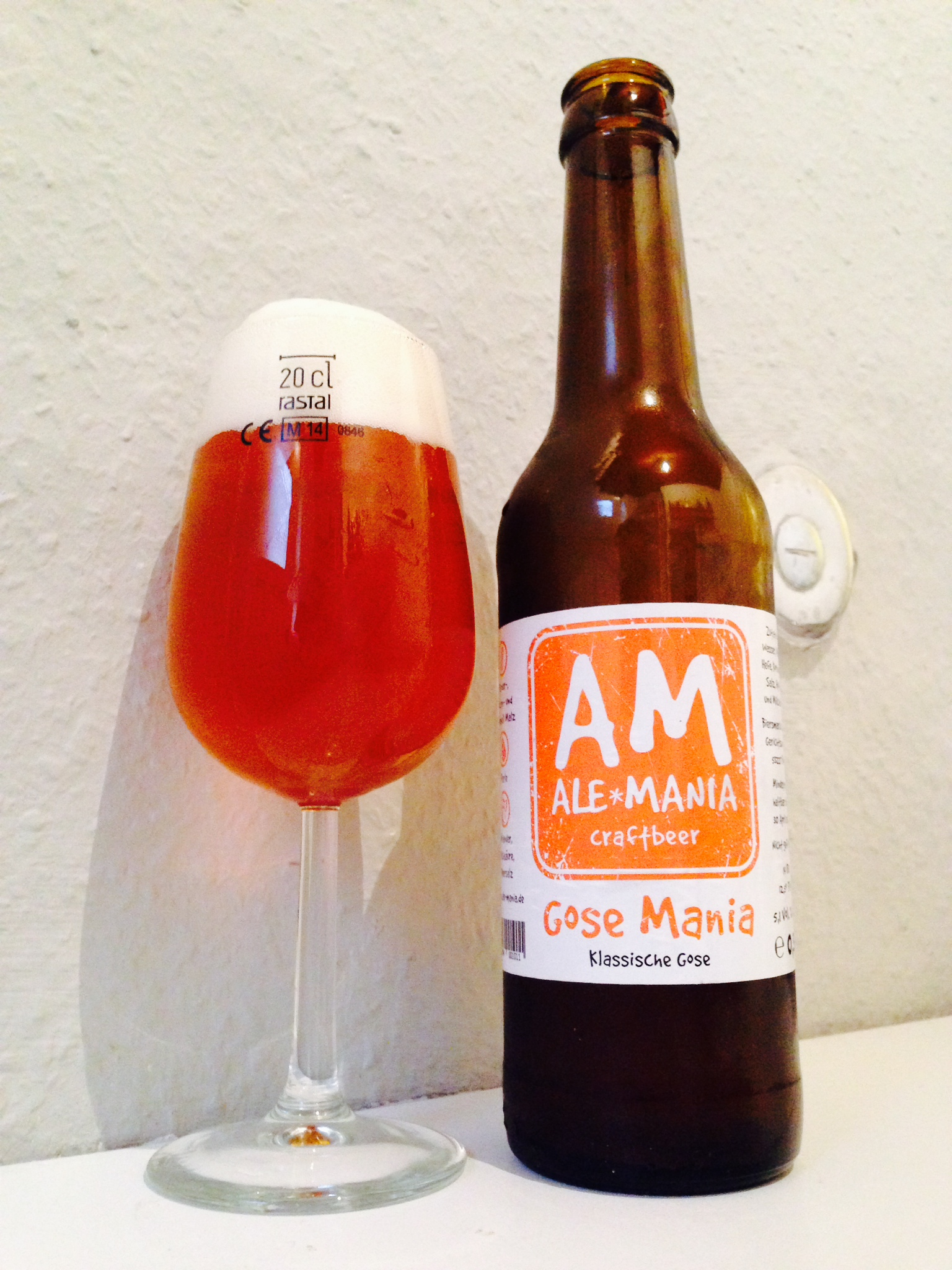
Gose beer, brewed in Bonn, Germany (2014)

There are over 400 producers of gose beer.

=== Germany ===
- Ritterguts Gose (Leipzig) - produces several different Gose specialities, and has been awarded the title of World's Best Traditional Beer several times
- Ale Mania (Bonn) - brews a gose with more coriander than usual, but less acidity, 5.0% ABV

=== USA ===
- Anderson Valley Brewing Company (California) - released The Holy Gose in 2014; since then has added several gose varieties to its roster, including Blood Orange, Briney Melon, Cherry, Peach, POG, and G&T Gose
- Druthers Brewing Company (New York) - brews Double Dare Strong Gose, a 7.1% ABV gose
- Martin House Brewing Company (Texas) - brews Salty Lady, a 5% ABV gose
- Union Craft Brewing (Baltimore) - brews several varieties, including Old Pro, which won the silver medal in the German-Style Sour Ale category at the 2014 Great American Beer Festival
- Westbrook Brewing (South Carolina) - brews a 4% ABV gose with sea salt and American ale yeast

=== United Kingdom ===
- Burnt Mill Brewery (Suffolk) - brews a gose with Japanese lychee
- Jump Ship (Edinburgh) - brews an alcohol-free gooseberry gose

=== New Zealand ===
- Parrotdog (Wellington) - released an avocado gose in 2020
