= Sierra Nevada World Music Festival =

Annual reggae and world music festival

Coordinates: 39.0052°N 123.3649°W

- Genre: Reggae, world music
- Dates: June
- Location: Mendocino County Fairgrounds in Boonville, California
- Years active: 1994–2019, 2021–2023
- Founders: Warren & Gretchen Smith
- Website: Official website

The Sierra Nevada World Music Festival was an annual music festival held every June on the weekend of (or the weekend following) the summer solstice. It was last held at the Mendocino County Fairgrounds in Boonville, California.

== History ==
The festival began in 1994 in Marysville, California by organizer Warren Smith. Citing problems with crime in its initial location, organizers moved the festival to Angels Camp, California in 2001. After five years in Calaveras County, fairgrounds management insisted on hiring its own security and billing the festival. Organizers refused, causing the county to void the contract between the two parties. The festival settled in its current location (Boonville, CA), where it has operated since 2006.

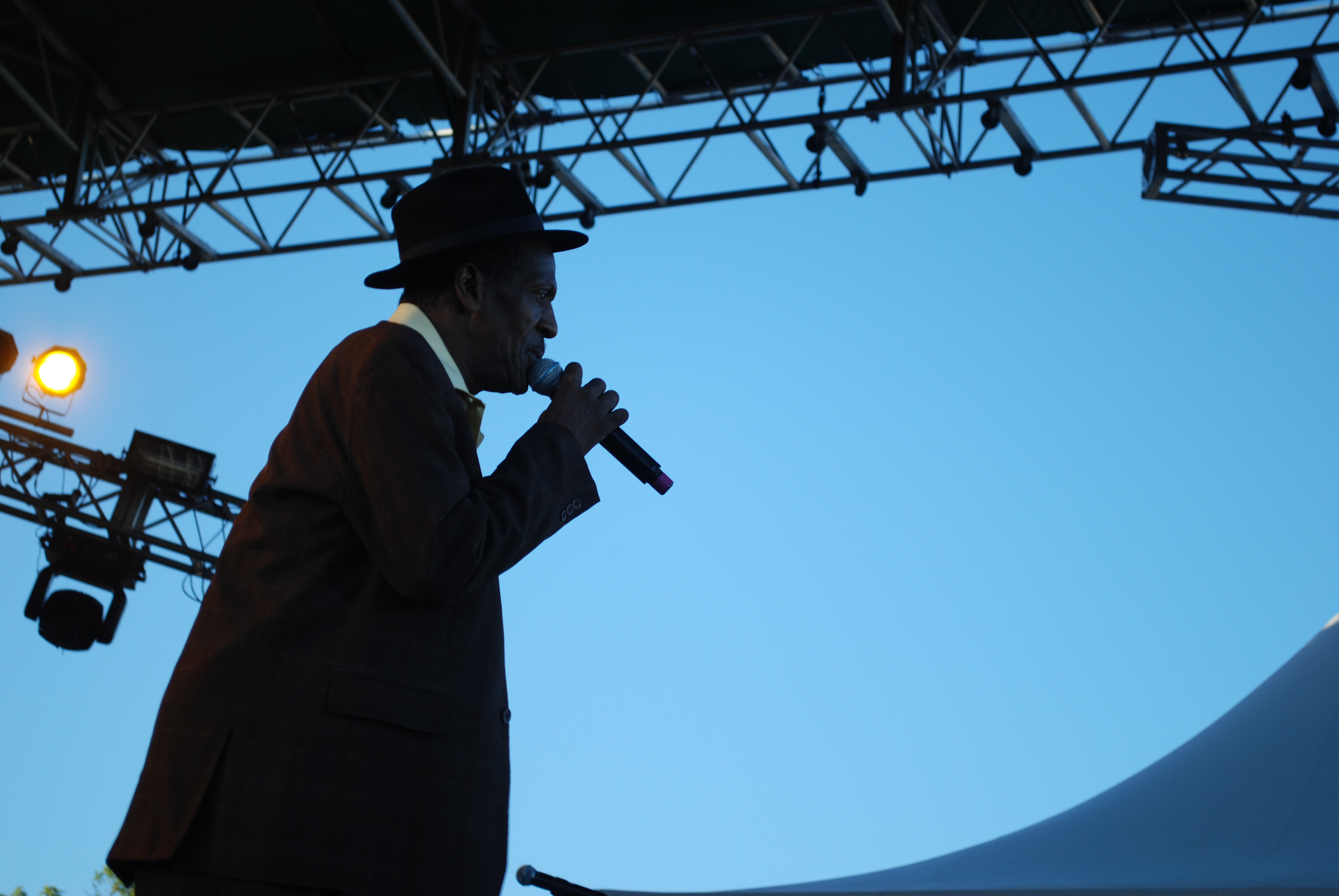
Gregory Isaacs at SNWMF 2010

Despite the festival's name, its primary focus is on reggae music, along with a secondary focus on world music acts. The festival boasts a "valley stage" (main stage), "village stage" (secondary stage), dancehall and drum circle, which can all feature music running concurrently.

Along with its many other veteran acts, the SNWMF is notable for being the first to bring Junior Byles abroad, whereupon he performed a 45-minute set in for the festival in 1998.

There was no festival from 2020-2022 due to the COVID-19 pandemic, with founder Smith dying in 2021.

Festival returned in 2023, carried on by his wife Gretchen. However, disappointing ticket sales in 2024 forced a cancellation close to the start date, with would-be attendees told that the passes were good at Reggae on the River event in the Humboldt County, California in lieu of a refund.

== See also ==
- List of reggae festivals
- Reggae
