= Windows on the World (film) =

- Directed by: Michael D. Olmos
- Screenplay by: Robert Mailer Anderson; Zack Anderson
- Produced by: Robert Mailer Anderson; Vicangelo Bulluck
- Starring: Ryan Guzman; Edward James Olmos
- Cinematography: Reynaldo Villalobos
- Edited by: Dylan Quint
- Production companies: Big Indie Films; Upcal Entertainment; Vicangelo Films
- Release date: March 3, 2019 (Sedona)
- Country: United States
- Language: English

Windows on the World is a 2019 American drama film directed by Michael D. Olmos and starring Ryan Guzman and Edward James Olmos. The title of the film refers to the namesake restaurant that used to exist in the top floors of the North Tower of the World Trade Center until it was destroyed in the September 11 attacks.

== Plot ==
Following the collapse of the World Trade Center towers, Fernando, a young Mexican man, journeys to New York City in search of his father, an undocumented busboy at Windows on the World, who has disappeared in the disaster, yet may be alive. Fernando's adventures along the way, finding love and friendship, give him faith in humanity while teaching hard lessons.

== Cast ==
- Ryan Guzman as Fernando
- René Auberjonois as Maury
- Edward James Olmos as Balthazar
- Julie Carmen as Elena
- Jacqueline Obradors as Margot
- Richard Cabral as Domingo
- Glynn Turman as Lou
- Stephen Spinella as Albert
- Anna Sophia Mota Arellano as Esmeralda

== Production ==
Principal photography began on July 10, 2017.

== Release ==
The film made its worldwide premiere on March 3, 2019 at the Sedona Film Festival.
