= Howard Junker =

- Born: 1940 (age 85–86); Port Washington, New York
- Occupations: Writer and editor
- Years active: 1961-
- Known for: ZYZZYVA

Howard Junker (born 1940) is a writer, editor, and founder of the literary journal ZYZZYVA.

== Early life and education ==
Howard Junker was born in 1940 in Port Washington, New York, and educated at Canterbury School (Connecticut). He graduated from Amherst College in 1961, and earned an M.A. from the University of San Francisco in 1978.

== Career ==
Junker's work as a journalist appeared in a range of American magazines from the mid-1960s, including Art in America, Artforum, Film Comment, Film Quarterly, The Nation, The New Republic, New York, Playboy, Rolling Stone, The Village Voice and Vogue.

His 1965 article in The Nation about Andy Warhol's work as a filmmaker—among the first articles on the subject—is anthologized in a collection of notable film writing from the magazine. Junker's production notes on the Maysles Brothers/Charlotte Zwerin film Salesmen (1969), included in a contemporaneous book about the film, lend insight to the methods of these pioneering documentarians.

In 1985, Junker founded the literary journal ZYZZYVA. The journal initially emphasized west coast writers and later broadened to focus on new work from around the United States and internationally. Under Junker's editorship, ZYZZYVA published early works by Po Bronson, Chitra Divakaruni, F.X. Toole, David Rains Wallace and Sherman Alexie, among others. ZYZZYVA also presented Haruki Murakami's first English-language publication. Junker retired from ZYZZYVA in 2010 and was succeeded by Laura Cogan. He has edited several anthologies of works published in ZYZZYVA, as well as a multi-volume memoir and an oral history, "Lord Jeff & The Closet." He resides in San Francisco.

== Selected bibliography ==
- Junker, Howard (1991). Roots and Branches: Contemporary Essays By West Coast Writers. San Francisco: Mercury House. ISBN 978-1-56279-014-1.
- Junker, Howard (1995). The Writer's Notebook. San Francisco: HarperCollinsWest. ISBN 978-0-06-258618-6.
- Junker, Howard (1995). Strange Attraction: The Best of Ten Years of ZYZZYVA. Reno: University of Nevada Press. ISBN 978-0-87417-275-1.
- Junker, Howard (1999). Lucky Break: How I Became A Writer. Portsmouth, NH: Heinemann. ISBN 978-0-325-00156-2.
- Junker, Howard (2005). AutoBioDiversity: True Stories from ZYZZYVA. Berkeley, CA: Heyday. ISBN 978-1-59714-007-2.
- Junker, Howard (2011). An Old Junker. San Francisco: IF SF Publishing. ISBN 978-1-4537-1719-6.
