= Boontling =

Argot spoken in and around Boonville, California

- Region: Boonville, California
- Language family: Indo-European: Germanic; West Germanic; North Sea Germanic; Anglo–Frisian; Anglic; English; North American English; American English; Boontling

Language codes
- ISO 639-3: –
- IETF: en-boont
- Boonville, the center of Boontling usage
- Coordinates: 38.999132°N 123.358368°W

Boontling is a jargon or argot based on English, spoken in and around Boonville, California. Boontling was created in the 1890s and spoken most widely just before World War I. It gained attention in the 1960s and 1970s from published research and television appearances by Boontling speakers. By 2025 the lingo no longer had any fluent speakers, though it is still used recreationally and for advertising.

== History ==
=== Origin and spread ===
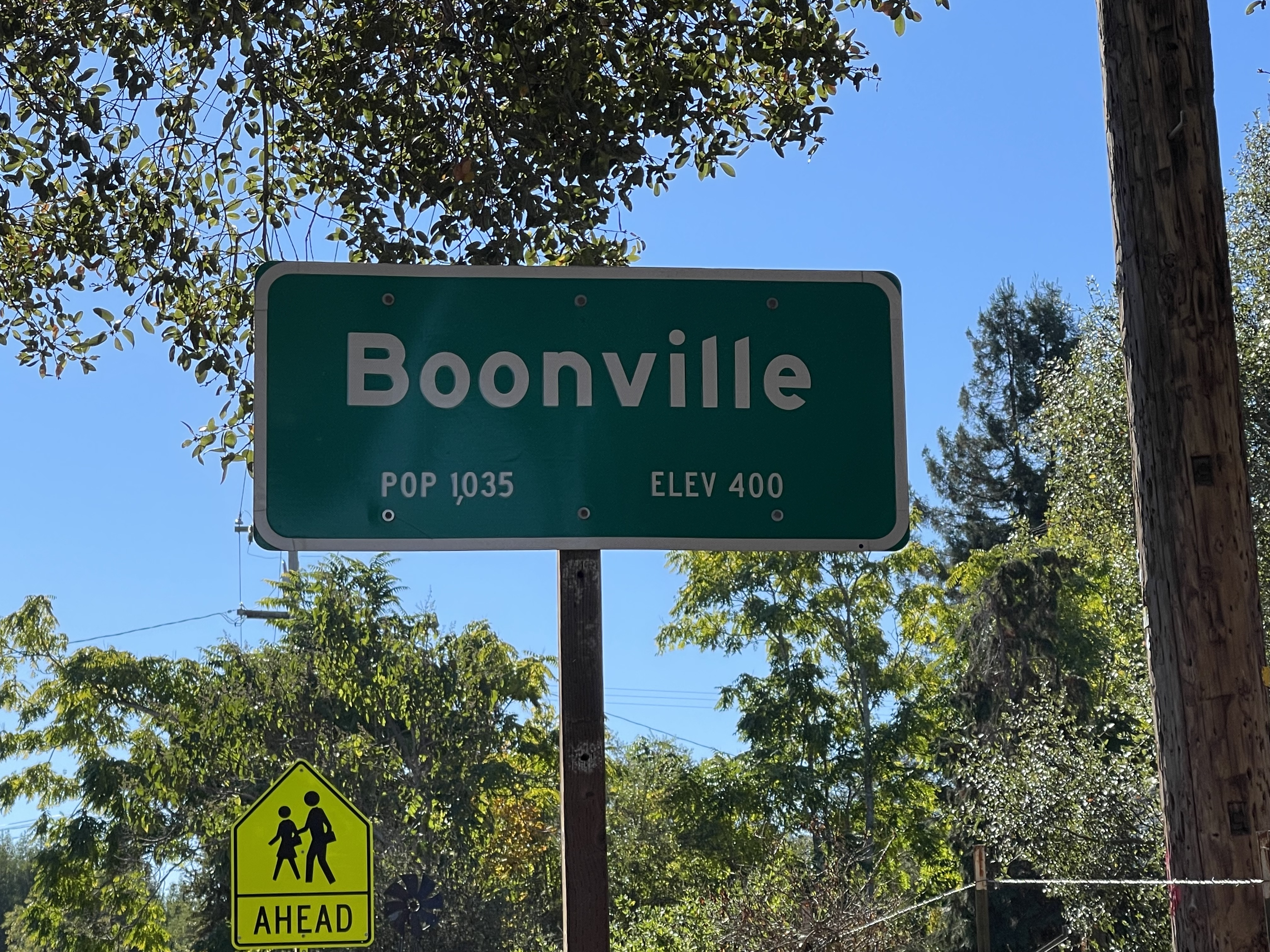
A sign indicating Boonville, California.

Boontling was created in the late 19th century in the isolated Anderson Valley in Mendocino County, California, a sparsely populated farming, ranching and logging region. Boonville (Boontling "Boont") was and still is its largest town.

Several different stories are told of who created Boontling: women and children working in the hop fields, children who wanted to speak freely in front of elders without being understood (Myrtle Rawles cites an informant who credited Ed "Squirrel" Clement and Lank McGimsey with making up the first Boontling words in the summer of 1890), adults who didn't want to be understood by children, and young men on sheepshearing crews and the local baseball team. More than one of these stories might be true to some extent. As to where Boontling arose, Charles Adams found a consensus among informants that it was in Bell Valley (Boontling "Belk"), six miles northeast of Boonville, where hops were grown and where many early speakers lived.

Boontling spread throughout the southern Anderson Valley. Boonville competed economically, politically and socially with the valley's next largest town, Philo (Boontling "Poleeko"), six miles to the north, and Boontling speakers excluded most residents of the northern valley, on the other side of the so-called "Mason-Dixon Line". Boontling vocabulary also suggests that Boontlingers were primarily those who lived in Boonville and on the valley floor, calling the scattered residents of the surrounding hills and mountains "ridgy", meaning backwoodsy and unsophisticated.

Boontling was spoken most widely in the first decade of the 20th century. It declined when many speakers left the valley to fight in World War I.

=== Scholarship and publicity ===
Boontling historian Jack "Wee Fuzz" June was an early contributor to written Boontling, writing down words and stories he heard as a child and being interviewed for or writing articles on the language in San Francisco newspapers. Boontling was first mentioned in a scholarly publication in 1942. Lynwood Carranco and Wilma Rawles Simmons published the first lengthy scholarly article on Boontling in 1964. Area resident Myrtle Rawles documented the language in her 1966 article and 1967 book based on interviews of family and neighbors. Researcher Charles C. Adams wrote his 1967 doctoral dissertation and a 1971 book, which included an extensive dictionary, on the lingo.

Boontling briefly enjoyed a national audience in the mid-1970s when a Boontling speaker named Bobby "Chipmunk" Glover was a regular guest with Johnny Carson on the well-known Tonight Show. Jack June appeared on the game show To Tell the Truth. Both men were interviewed on On the Road with Charles Kuralt.

=== In the twenty-first century ===
In 2015 Boontling had less than 100 living speakers, many of whom were not fluent. The last prominent fluent speaker, Wes Smoot, died in 2024.

Today Boontling can be seen in the Anderson Valley History Museum (and sometimes heard at events there), on the billboards at the north and south ends of the valley that welcome visitors, in the names of the Anderson Valley Brewing Company's beers and in its advertising, in the names of the Breggo and Bee Hunter wineries and wines such as Handley Cellars' Brightlighter and Foursight Wines' Paraboll, and in the names of Pennyroyal Farms' cheeses.

== Uses ==
Every Boontling speaker's first language was English. Boontling would be spoken instead of English for many purposes: to conceal conversation from non-speakers or less-skilled speakers, perhaps older, younger or of the opposite sex than the speaker; to provide euphemisms for taboo subjects; to show belonging to the southern Anderson Valley; for the entertainment of learning, coining and judging vocabulary, and to befuddle (Boontling "shark") outsiders who expected standard English.

== Characteristics ==
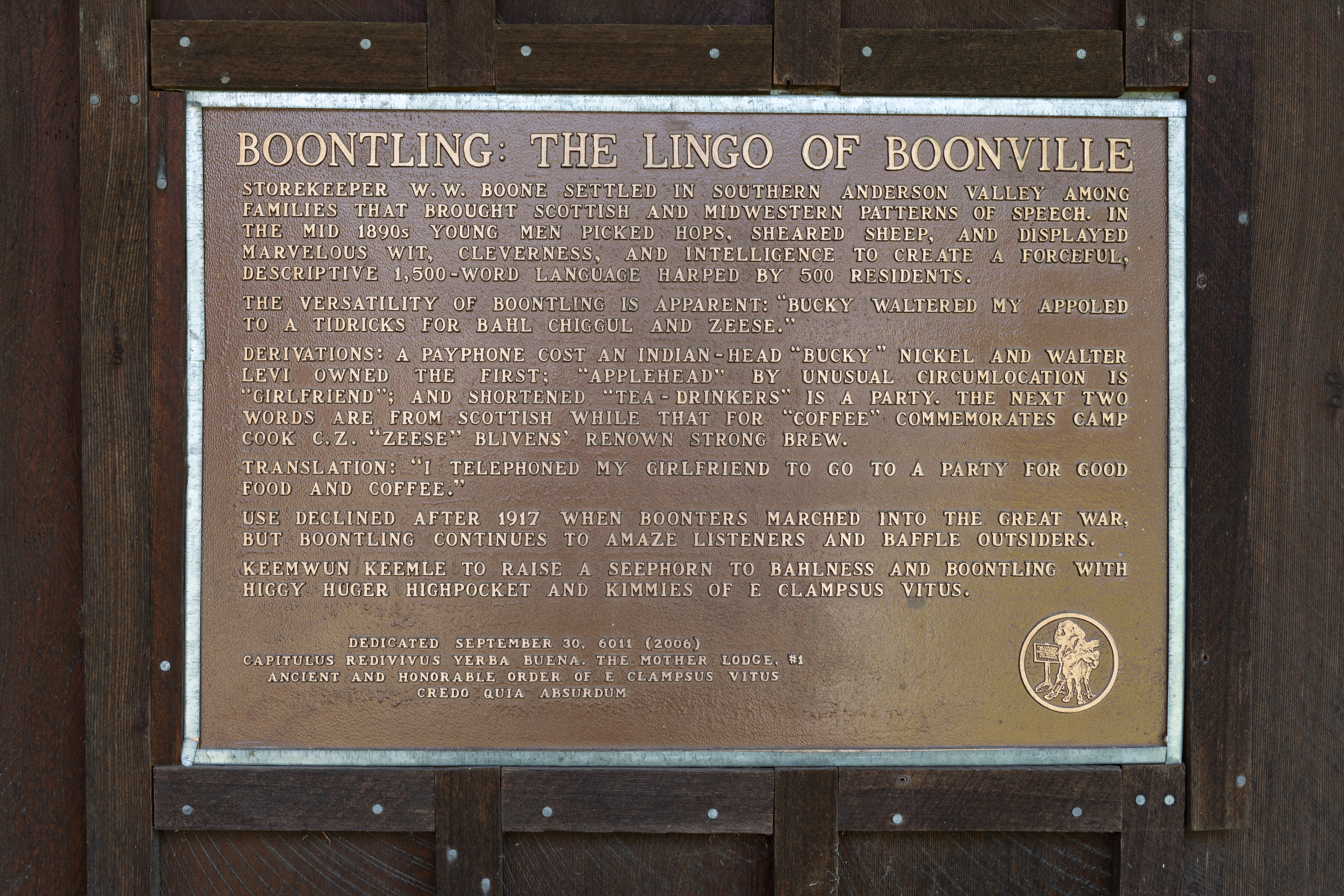
Plaque celebrating Boontling, with the sentence "Bucky waltered my appoled to a tidricks for bahl chiggul and zeese." ("(I) telephoned my girlfriend to go to a party for good food and coffee.")

Boontling is based on standard American English, but it has more than a thousand words and phrases of its own, enough to be unintelligible to a fluent speaker of English.

=== Pronunciation ===
Boontling words are made up of the same phonemes as English words. However, Boontling, like most working-class English speech, ends gerunds and progressive verbs with "-in'" rather than with "-ing".

=== Spelling ===
Boontling is primarily spoken rather than written. Spellings of its words vary among early sources.

=== Grammar ===
Boontling's grammar is almost that of English, with some distinctive wrinkles:

- Possessive nouns sometimes do not explicitly indicate possession. One might say "haireem sluggin' nook" for "the dog's bed". Similarly, Boontling adverbs never end with "-ly".
- Boontling usually intensifies an adjective or adverb by preceding it with "more" or "most" rather than by suffixing it with "-er" or "-est". ("Bahler" and "bahlest" ("better" and "best") are exceptions.)
- A verb is sometimes followed with "on" where English would use a different preposition or none at all, for example "bow on", to fight with or have intercourse with, or "non on", to criticize or prohibit.
- The "-er" suffix is used especially often, to show some relationship between the person or thing described and the suffixed word: one who does something, for example "horner" ("drinker"), as in English; someone or something from a place, for example "Boonter" (a resident of Boonville); and other varied relationships, for example "beljeemer" (a dog that hunts rabbits, "beljeeks" in Boontling).
- Some nouns are formed by adding "-y" or "-ie" to adjectives, for example "broadie" ("cow").
- In another manifestation of Boontling's tendency to conciseness, articles, linking verbs and the like are often dropped from sentences.

=== Vocabulary ===
Much Boontling vocabulary describes topics important to its creators and speakers, such as sheep and cattle ranching and hunting. Boontling also has many words related to sex and other taboo topics, nicknames for local people, and names for places in and around Anderson Valley.

Boontling words come from several different sources:

- Some are taken from other languages, including Scottish, Irish, Spanish and Pomoan. "Wee" ("small"), from Scottish, is strongly preferred to "smeel" (also "small"), and is used in many compound words. "boo" ("potato") and "boshe" ("deer") are Pomoan. "breggo" ("sheep") and "laychee" ("milk") derive closely from Spanish "borrego" and "leche".
- Onomatopoeia provides words including "rooky-to" ("quail") and "kiloppety" ("to ride horseback").
- Some terms are figurative: a coyote is a "bootjack", from the shape of its ears in silhouette; a collector or hoarder is a "chipmunk".
- Names of people are used for things associated with them. A "greeley sheet" is a newspaper, after publisher Horace Greeley. A telephone is a "walter levi", after the first valley resident to own one.
- Modification of source words is extremely important in Boontling, especially abbreviation. Boontling consciously strove to be terse. "Boonville" became "Boont", "Bell Valley" "Belk". A saloon is a "sale" and whiskey is "skee". Many other phonemic shifts were also used in deriving Boontling words.

== See also ==
- Californian English
- Speech community
