= Zero-Sum: Stories =

2023 collection of works by Joyce Carol Oates

- First edition
- Author: Joyce Carol Oates
- Cover artist: René Magritte, Zeno's Arrow, 1964
- Language: English
- Genre: Gothic literature
- Publisher: Alfred A. Knopf
- Publication date: 2023
- Publication place: United States
- Media type: Print (hardback)
- Pages: 272
- ISBN: 978-0-593-53586-8

Zero-Sum: Stories is a collection of short fiction by Joyce Carol Oates published in 2023 by Alfred A. Knopf. The stories originally appeared in magazines and anthologies (See below).

== Stories ==
I

- "Zero-Sum" (Conjunctions no. 77, 2021)
- "Mr. Stickum" (Playboy, Summer 2019)
- "Lovesick" (Fiction, Number 66, 2023)
- "Sparrow" (American Short Fiction, Volume 25, Issue 77, Winter 2022/23)
- "The Cold" (Virginia Quarterly Review, May 21, 2019)
- "Take Me, I Am Free" (When Things Get Dark: Stories Inspired by Shirley Jackson (2021) ed. Ellen Datlow)

II

- "The Suicide" (Boulevard, Fall 2021)

III

- "The Baby Monitor" (Conjunctions, Spring 2022)
- "Monstersister" (Conjunctions, Spring/May 2020)
- "A Theory Pre-Post-Mortem" (Conjunctions, Winter 2020)
- "This Is Not a Drill" (INQUE)
- "M A R T H E: A Referendum" (Elle, April 22, 2020)

== Reception ==
Declaring Oates "a master of the short form", Kirkus Reviews observes that the characters in the collection suffer more from the severity of the author's "taut, efficient sentences" than the narratives she places them in:

Throughout the collection, Oates' vicious incisiveness enacts a more brutal persecution than any of the cruelties the characters inflict upon each other—ultimately leaving little room for change in any direction other than the downward spiral.

Literary critic Donna Seaman at Booklist notes the extremity to which Oates applies the Gothic literary traditions of Edgar Allan Poe and Shirley Jackson, characterizing the collection as "high-pitched, unnerving, and incisive". Reviewer Kate Folk at The New York Times identifies the longest story, "The Suicide" as "the collection's centerpiece". According to Oates, the chief protagonist, Harold Hofsteader, is a fictionalized "alter ego" of David Foster Wallace.

== Sources ==
- Folk, Kate (July 12, 2023). "In these four-story collections, horror abounds". The New York Times. Accessed March 2, 2025.
- Oates, Joyce Carol (2023). Zero-Sum: Stories. Alfred A. Knopf, New York. ISBN 978-0-593-53586-8
