= Pig Hunt =

- Directed by: James Isaac
- Written by: Robert Mailer Anderson; Zack Anderson
- Produced by: James Isaac
- Starring: Travis Aaron Wade
- Narrated by: Fangoria
- Cinematography: Adam Kane
- Edited by: Graham Willcox
- Music by: David E. Russo
- Production company: Pig Hunt Productions
- Distributed by: Epic Pictures Group
- Release date: July 21, 2008; (Fantasia Film Festival)
- Running time: 100 minutes
- Country: United States
- Language: English
- Budget: $6 million

Pig Hunt is a 2008 American science fiction action horror film directed by James Isaac, it was written by Robert Mailer Anderson and Zack Anderson. In the film, a group faces a monstrous wild boar while trying to survive vengeful rednecks and a deranged cult of hippie women. The film includes several original songs by Les Claypool, who also plays a minor role as the preacher.

== Plot ==
John Hickman and his girlfriend Brooks invite their friends Ben, Wayne, and Quincy to a weekend of hunting and drinking near John's uncle's remote cabin. En route, they stop at a gas station for directions and encounter a van of hippie women and their leader, the Hippie Stranger, who live in a commune in the woods. At the general store, the group learns about a local legend called "The Ripper," a legendary killer hog which supposedly weighs several thousand pounds. The group passes through a hillbilly homestead belonging to the Tibbs clan. When they get to John's uncle's cabin, they find it vandalized and uninhabitable.

The next morning, the group meet brothers Jake and Ricky Tibbs, cousins of John's, who are interested in joining them on a wild hog hunt. An old feud still exists between John and Ricky, a Gulf War veteran showing signs of mental illness. When Jake sets up some targets to see how well the others can shoot, Brooks bests Ben and Wayne's attempts, impressing Tibbs. During the hunt, the group encounters an area called the Big Wallow and use a piglet call as a lure, attracting several boars. Wayne is incapacitated when a boar rams into his leg. Quincy's dog Wolfgang goes charging after the boars, while Brooks shoots at one of them. Ricky realizes the pig they've killed was an adult-sized piglet.

Quincy leads most of the group to a large crop of marijuana plants he discovered while looking for Wolfgang, leaving Brooks with Wayne. John objects to Jake and Ricky taking the plants for profit, as the plants are on his property. A sign posted near the plants leads John to believe that the hippie women are growing pot. During the argument, Ricky snaps and holds John at bay with a crossbow. Ben arrives on the scene and shoots Ricky, thinking he is about to kill John. Jake flees to tell his clan. Quincy and Ben start making their way back to the cabin, while Brooks and John leave Wayne to find something to make a stretcher with to carry Wayne out of the area. Shortly after their departure, Wayne is attacked by something, and fires off a single round. Brooks and John circle back and find him missing, along with Ricky's body.

Meanwhile, Ben and Quincy find Wolfgang's mutilated body in the cabin and determine that he was killed by the Tibbs clan. When the clan appears, Ben manages to kill his pursuer and escape, but Quincy gets caught and is shot in the head. While hiding in the forest, John and Brooks run into the mysterious Hippie Stranger, who tells them that he is looking for an escaped animal, and that they can contact the police from his commune. He helps John and Brooks beat off an attack by the Tibbs clan. Meanwhile, Ben has found the commune, where he is given drugs by several women, and led into an enormous, muddy pen. Ben encounters a dying Wayne, who says that something has been eating him. Ben is shocked by something approaching him.

The remaining Tibbs clan members reach the woods around the commune, where almost all of them are all killed by the hippies, while the remaining man is seized by something else. Brooks and John arrive at the commune with the Hippie Stranger. When John questions why Ben's equipment is there, but not Ben himself, the members force him into a cell, while the leader takes Brooks out into the pen where the Ripper resides. Jake enters the commune and forces one of the women to let him into John's cell. Jake freezes in shock upon seeing the Ripper, and is killed by the hippie he brought with him. The Hippie Stranger prepares to sacrifice Brooks to the boar, whom he and his followers have been worshiping. Brooks pokes the Hippie Stranger with his own cattle prod, attracting the Ripper's attention and leading it to eviscerate him. John kills the Ripper with a crossbow. Brooks and John escape from the commune, where they come face to face with a feral boy perched in a tree, who dropped a dead animal carcass on the group's car earlier.

== Cast ==
- Travis Aaron Wade as John Hickman
- Tina Huang as Brooks
- Howard Johnson Jr. as Ben
- Trevor Bullock as Quincy
- Rajiv Shah as Wayne
- Jason Foster as Jake
- Nick Tagas as Ricky
- Phillip K. Torretto as Beer Belly Redneck
- Cimi Ahluwalia as Cimi
- Robert Mailer Anderson as Big Train
- Bryonn Bain as Hippie Stranger
- Vince Ballew as Gas Mask
- Max Barnett as ZZ Driver
- Leanne Borghesi as Darlene
- Ty Brenneman as Sexy Cult Girl
- Cara Cameron as Cult Girl
- Les Claypool as Preacher
- Lane Foard as Lex Wockenfuss
- Lanie Grainger as Poppy
- Marissa Ingrasci as Sage
- India Isaac as India
- Joe Lucas as Homeless Vet
- Christina McKay as Crystal
- Charlie Musselwhite as Charlie
- Henrietta "Henri" Musselwhite as Woman Shelving Cans of Creamed Corn
- Chris Paxton as Billy Stankbud
- Michelle Redwine as Willow
- Luis Saguar as TJ
- Karen Viola as Cult Girl
- Stephanie Voelckers as Rain

== Production ==
Pig Hunt Productions shoot the film in spring 2008 in Boonville, California and The Haight District, San Francisco. Rob and Zack Anderson characterized the script responsible for Epic Pictures Group. The shooting cost about 6 million US dollars.

== Soundtrack ==
The Memphis-based film composer David E. Russo scored the soundtrack.

== Release ==
The film premiered at the Fantasia Film Festival on July 21, 2008. It had its West Coast premiere in the United States on May 5, 2009. The film is part of the 2010 Fangoria FrightFest.

=== Home release ===
Lightning Media released the DVD and Blu-ray in July 2010 with a bonus behind-the-scenes documentary with a total length of about 40 minutes.

== Reception ==
In a positive review, Sean Smithson of Twitch Film states that Pig Hunt is a cult film in which "the story is the star". Joshua Siebalt of DreadCentral rated the film 0.5 out of 5 and called it misogynistic, immature, and annoying. Bill Gibron of DVD Talk rated the film 4 out of 5 and described it as "wholly original" yet strongly influenced by many other films. Heidi Williams of The Oregonian rated it C− and wrote that it "comes off... like a SciFi Channel B movie." Jeremy Knox of Film Threat rated the film 3/5 stars and called it "a flawed, but really fun film". In a mixed review, Dennis Harvey of Variety called it "enjoyably offbeat" but "not entirely satisfying". Mick LaSalle of the SF Gate rated the film 3 out of 5 stars and called it "a routine thriller" that is pretty good for what it is.
