= Bryonn Bain =

American writer, musician and activist

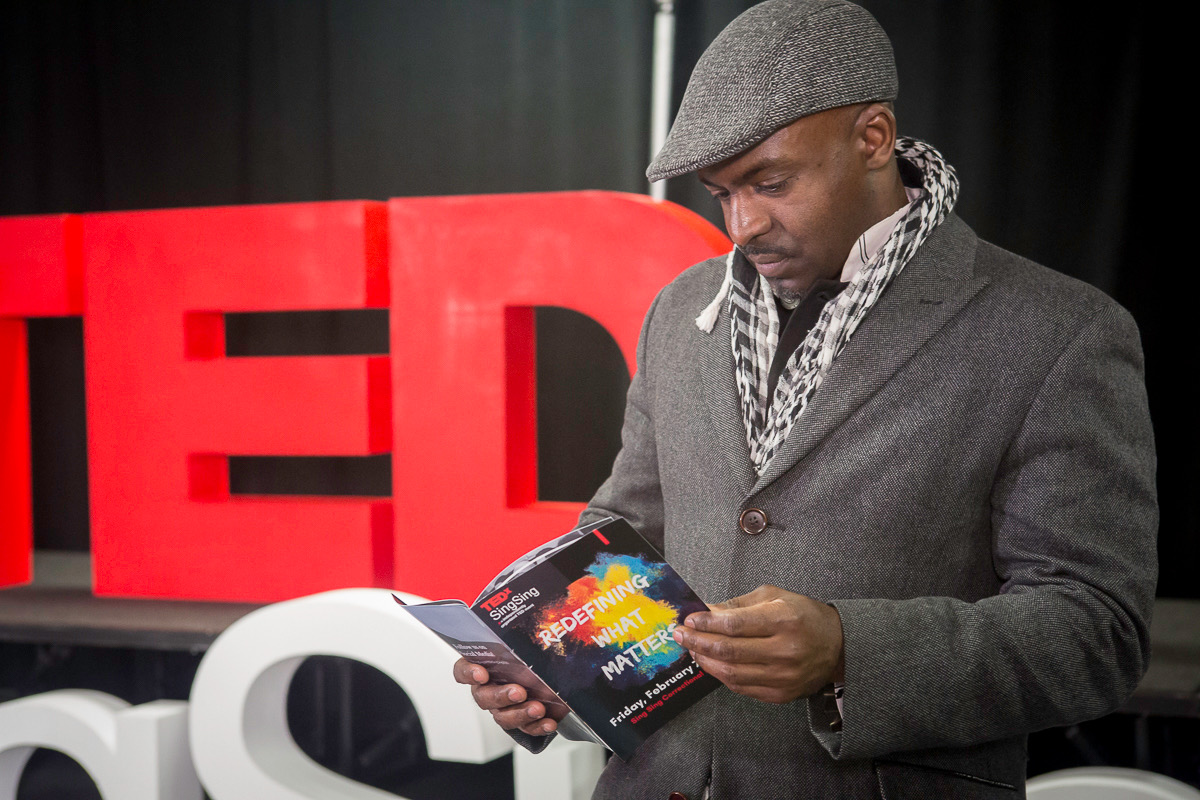
- Bain at TED Sing Sing Prison
- Born: New York City, U.S.
- Occupations: Writer, musician, and activist

Bryonn Bain is an American poet, actor, prison activist, scholar, author, hip-hop artist and professor of African American Studies and World Arts & Cultures in the School of the Arts and the School of Law at the University of California at Los Angeles (UCLA).

His one-man show, Lyrics From Lockdown, won "Best Solo Performance" from the LA Weekly and NAACP. Executive-produced by Harry Belafonte,, later Ron Simons, Rob Reiner, and Gina Belafonte, among others, the show tells stories of wrongful incarceration—including Bain's and his close friend Nanon Williams'—through spoken-word poetry, hip-hop theater, calypso, comedy and classical music. Its latest iteration was performed at the Academy Museum in 2025. Bain founded the Prison Education Program at UCLA in 2015. In 2019, the program and his performances at the Kennedy Center for the Performing Arts were featured on the debut episode of LA Stories, which won an Emmy Award. Bain hosted My Two Cents, a current affairs talk show on BET, for five consecutive seasons, and starred in Pig Hunt, the last film directed by Academy Award-winner James Isaac. A Tony-nominated theater maker, Bain was a producer of the Broadway revival of Ntozake Shange's classic For Colored Girls Who Have Considered Suicide / When the Rainbow is Enuf.

== Family and education ==
Born in New York City to parents who immigrated to Brooklyn from Trinidad, Bain is the eldest of five children. His West Indian father was a calypso singer and then a soldier, and his mother of South Asian descent, served as a registered ICU nurse for over 40 years. Bain attended Columbia University at the age of 16 and studied Political Science with a concentration in Black Studies. He went on to earn a master's degree in Urban Politics, Cultural Studies and Performance from the Gallatin School at New York University. He also earned a Juris Doctor from Harvard Law School.

== Work ==
=== Poetry ===
Bain was the Boston Grand Slam Champion in 1999, and in 2000, he was the Nuyorican Grand Slam Poetry Champion. Bain ranked #1 in the nation and placed second in the world during the 2000 International Poetry Slam.

=== Organizing ===
Bain founded the Blackout Arts Collective in 1997. He organized artists, activists and educators of color to create a space to organize justice movement campaigns, produce social impact-focused art, and facilitate political education workshops in public schools and prisons around the country. At its peak, BAC had chapters in 10 cities around the country.

=== Prison ===
Bain has developed and taught courses linking prisons with Columbia University, New York University, The New School, Long Island University, University of California at Los Angeles and internationally at Oxford and Cambridge, in the UK and Muteesa I Royal University in Uganda.

His work has reached prisons in 25 states in the United States including Rikers Island, Sing Sing, Wallkill, DC Jail, Metropolitan Detention Center, Boys Town Detention Center, California Institution for Women, Custody to Community Transitional Reentry Program, Barry J Nidorf Juvenile Hall, Central Juvenile Hall and Folsom. Bain founded the Prison Education Program at UCLA in 2015. In 2019, the program and his performances at the Kennedy Center were featured on the debut episode of LA Stories, which won an Emmy Award.

=== Performance ===
Bain's work has been featured at the Apollo Theater, Carnegie Hall, Lincoln Center, The Public Theater, The National Black Theatre, Rikers Island (New York), New Jersey Performing Arts Center (Newark), The Actor’s Gang Theater (Culver City), Los Angeles Theater Center (Los Angeles), Festival de Liege (Belgium), M-1 Theater Festival (Singapore), Universidad de las Americas (Mexico) and Muteesa Royal University (Uganda), Marion Prison (Ohio), TEDX at Ironwood State Prison and Sing Sing Prison.

== Discography ==
=== Albums ===
- 2005: Problem Child: The Philosophy and Opinions of Bryonn Bain
- 2008: Don't Be Scared
- 2015: Life After Lockdown

== Filmography ==
- 2002: Hunting in America
- 2003: Urban Scribe
- 2005: Filmic Achievement
- 2007: Lyrical Minded 415
- 2008: Pig Hunt
- 2014: The Darkest Hour: The Impact of Isolation and Death Row
- 2015: BaaaddD Sonia
- 2016: Chapter and Verse
- 2017: Why Prosecutors Matter
- 2018: On My Way
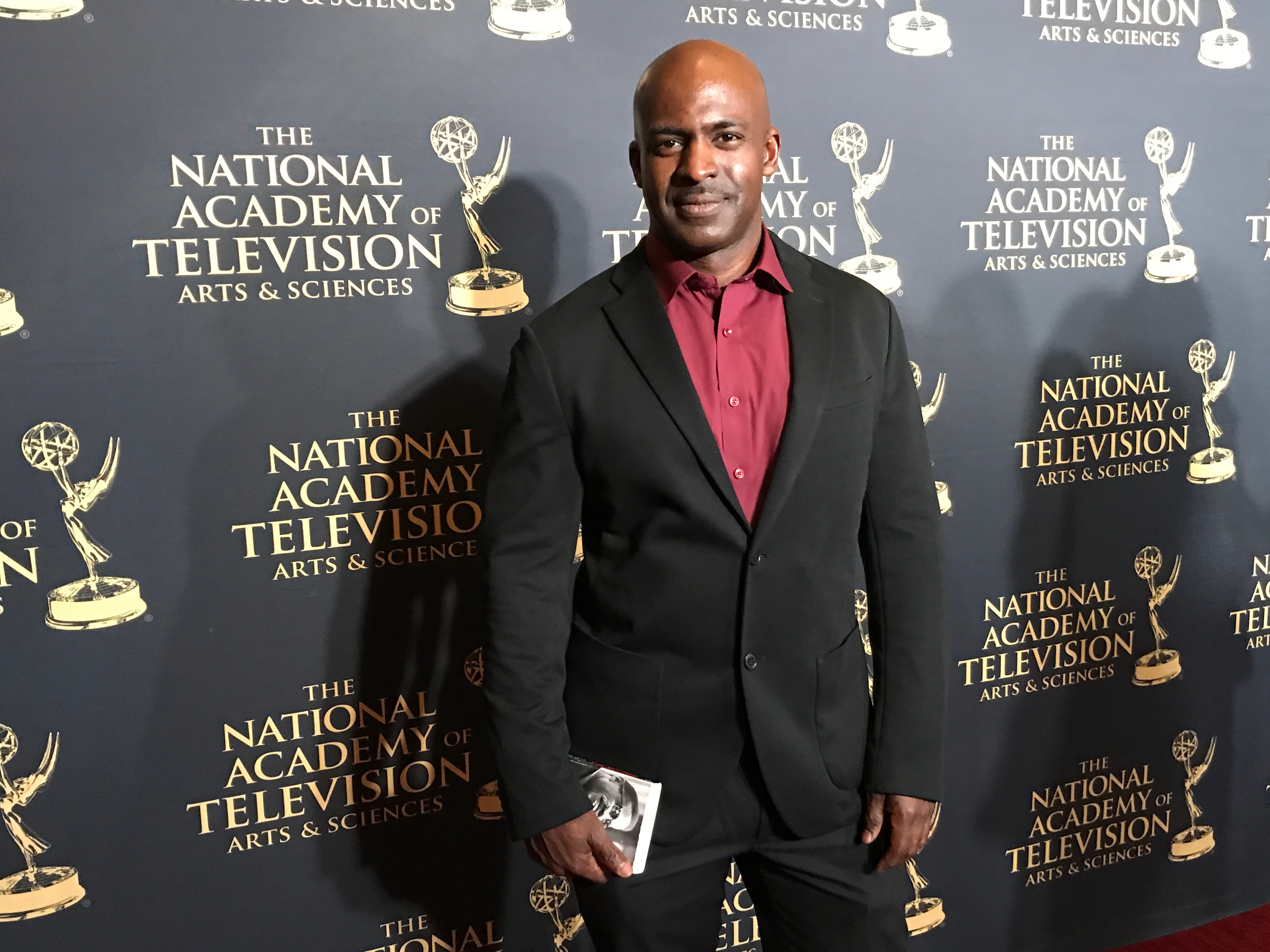
  Bain at National Academy of Television Arts and Sciences
- 2019: Windows on the World
- 2024: Ol' Dirty Bastard: A Tale of Two Dirtys. Available on Hulu and Showtime. In the Hour of Chaos: Hip Hop Art & Activism with Public Enemy’s Chuck D film screening at the Grammy Museum. Also available as a book.
- 2025: BEYOND, The Beyond the Block at Sing Sing Documentary (NYC DOCS Official Selection). 1906 Atlanta Race Massacre (Official Selection at SXSW Film Festival).

== Published works ==
- The Prophet Returns: the hip hop generation remix of a classic. New York. 2011. ISBN 978-0-615-46982-9. OCLC 812712654.
- The Ugly Side of Beautiful: Rethinking Race and Prison in America. Mumia Abu-Jamal, Lani Guinier (1 ed.). Chicago. 2012. ISBN 978-0-88378-344-3. OCLC 825113457.
- Fish & Bread/Pescado y Pan, Brown Girls Books, 2015
- Rebel Speak: A Justice Movement Mixtape. UC Press. 2022. ISBN 9780520388437.
- Temple Worship, 2025
