= Boonville (novel) =

Book by Robert Mailer Anderson

- First edition
- Author: Robert Mailer Anderson
- Language: English
- Publisher: Creative Arts Book Company
- Publication date: November 1, 2001
- Publication place: United States
- Media type: Print (hardcover)
- Pages: 224 pages
- ISBN: 0-88739-479-5
- OCLC: 48686012
- LC Class: PS3601.N+ B+

Boonville is a novel by Robert Mailer Anderson. It was published by Creative Arts Book Company (in association with Zyzzyva magazine, as a "Zyzzyva First Novel") in 2001, then reprinted by HarperCollins in 2003. It is a San Francisco Chronicle Best Seller and was called one of the "Top 10 Literary Events of 2001."

== Synopsis ==
The novel tells the story of John Gibson, as he breaks up with his girlfriend and leaves Miami, Florida to move to the small town of Boonville, California, where he meets the resident of a commune, Sarah McKay. The book portrays the town in an often comedic manner, bringing to life a number of colorful Mendocino County residents including hippies, rednecks, feminists, and commercial marijuana cultivation.

== Author comments ==
Anderson states in the book's preface, "So, any of the local residents who can read, and do read this novel, and take offense at the descriptions or content, instead of sucker-punching me while I'm in town trying to buy groceries with my wife and son, let me just buy you a drink and we'll call it even. As for the hippies in the county who may be upset at the depiction of hippies, I say, 'Tough shit, hippie.'"
