= Lazy Creek Vineyards =

American winery located in California

Coordinates: 39°6′25.96″N 123°29′55.72″W

Lazy Creek Winery
- Location: 113 Plaza St, Healdsburg, CA 95448, Healdsburg, California, United States
- Wine region: Anderson Valley
- Appellation: Napa Valley
- Founded: 1973
- First vines planted: Pinot noir Gewürztraminer; Riesling; Chardonnay
- Key people: Hans Kobler; Josh and Beth Chandler; Don Carano; Rhonda Carano
- Parent company: Ferrari-Carano
- Area cultivated: 52
- Cases/yr: 3,000
- Varietals: Gewürztraminer, Pinot Noir, Riesling, Chardonnay, Syrah
- Tasting: By appointment
- Website: lazycreekvineyards.com

Lazy Creek Vineyards is a winery owned by Ferrari-Carano. It is best known for its Gewürztraminer wine.

== History ==
The original Lazy Creek Vineyards property was first used as a farm and vineyard by the Pinolis family in the 1900s. They planted grapes and plum trees. In 1969, Hans and Theresia Kobler purchased the property. They maintained a ranch onsite and lived in San Francisco, before planting their first grapes in 1972. Their first grapes were Pinot noir and Gewürztraminer. It was then bought by Josh and Mary Beth Chandler and Dr. Noorthoek in 1999. After acquiring the vineyard, the Chandler's expanded the vineyard to 40 acres. They also had an on-site farm, with cattle, pigs and chickens. In the summer of 2008, they sold the winery to Don and Rhonda Carano, owners of Ferrari-Carano. The winery has been featured in the New York Times, the Sacramento Bee, and Sunset.

== Wine production ==
Historically, the winery produced syrah, pinot noir, Gewürztraminer, and chardonnay. Today, the winemaker is Christy Ackerman. The vineyard produces approximately 3,000 cases of wine. The original founder, Hans Kobler, planted a variety of grapes, including Gewürztraminer. The vines he planted were phylloxera-resistant. This was experimental at the time, and his grapes survived phylloxera attacks. Today, his Gewürztraminer vines remain some of the oldest in the Anderson Valley AVA. They grew their grapes organically. Their Gewürztraminer was aged in 20-year-old barrels. Today, Ackerman ages the grapes in stainless steel barrels rather than oak. They produce three acres of Gewürztraminer wine and produce 100 cases. The property also has Pinot noir grapes, many which were originally planted by Kobler. The winery sells both Lazy Creek wine and Ferrari-Carano wine.
