= Kate Folk =

American author and academic

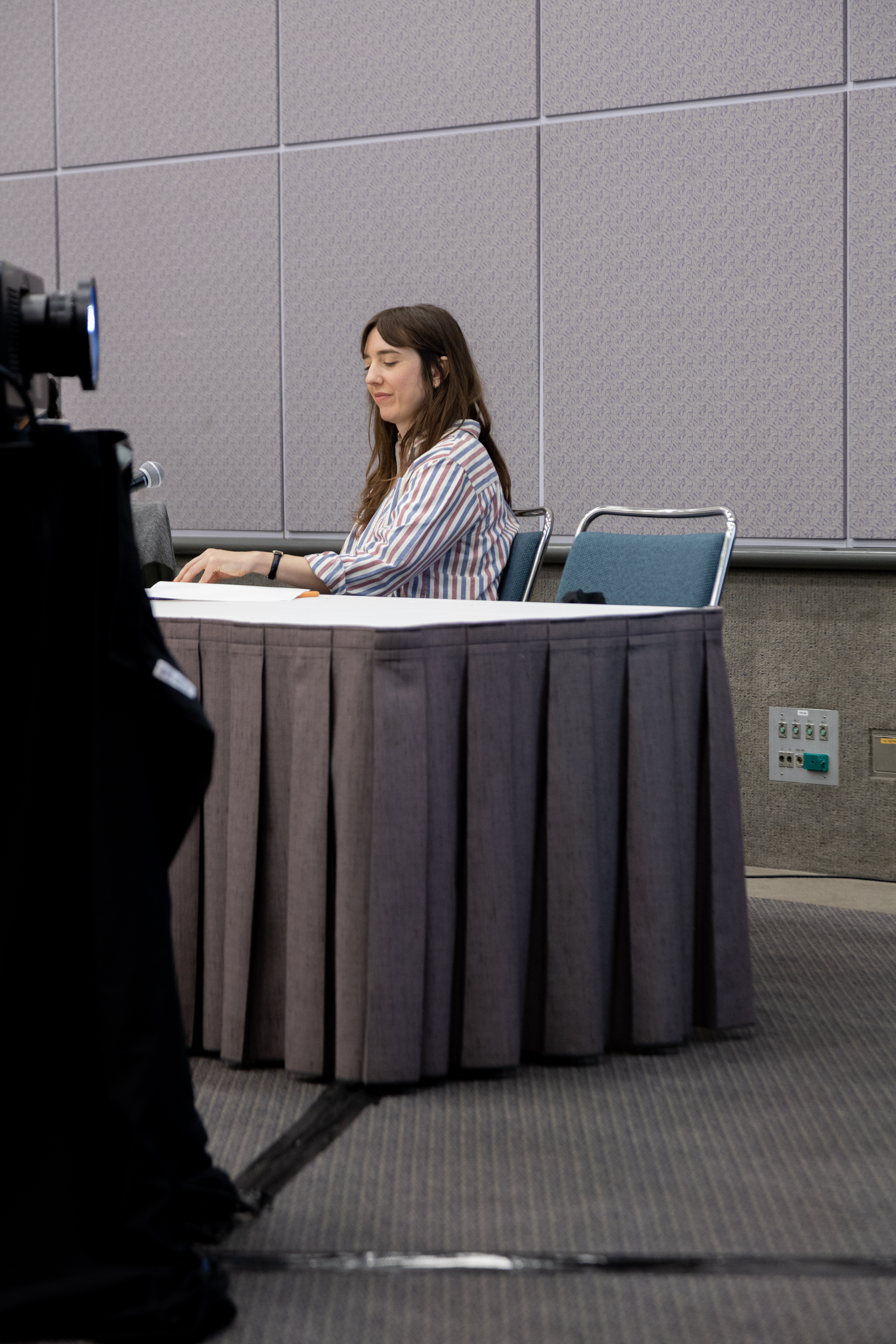
- Born: Iowa City, Iowa, US
- Occupations: Novelist, short story writer, essayist, college professor
- Writing career
- Language: English
- Genres: Literary fiction, horror, non-fiction
- Notable works: Out There (2022); Sky Daddy (2025)
- Notable awards: Stegner Fellow

Kate Folk is an American author of short stories, novels and essays.

Her book of short stories, Out There, was published in 2022, was a finalist for the California Book Award in First Fiction. and was named a best book of the year by Kirkus Reviews, the Chicago Review of Books, and Jezebel. It has been translated into Korean and Spanish.

In 2020, it was announced that Folk was developing a television show with Sharon Horgan for Hulu. A feature screenplay written by Folk was selected for the 2024 Black List.

Her debut novel, Sky Daddy, was published in 2025.

== Life ==
Kate Folk was born in Iowa City, IA. From 2019 to 2021, she was a Stegner Fellow in Fiction at Stanford University.

Folk has received fellowships and residencies from MacDowell (2017), Willapa Bay AiR (2023), the Vermont Studio Center (2014 and 2016), and the Virginia Center for the Creative Arts (2013). From 2016 to 2019, she was an Affiliate Artist at the Headlands Center for the Arts.

Folk has published short stories in The New Yorker, McSweeney's Quarterly Concern, Zyzzyva, Granta, The Baffler, Conjunctions, and One Story, among others.

She has also published essays and criticism in the New York Times Magazine, the New York Times Book Review, and Literary Hub.

== Bibliography ==
=== Fiction ===
- Sky Daddy (2025) Random House. ISBN 978-0593231494
- Out There (2022) ISBN 978-0593231463

=== Short stories ===
- "Out There"
- "The Bone Ward"
- "Shelter"
- "Heart Seeks Brain"
- "A Scale Model of Gull Point"
- "Pups"
- "The Void Wife"
- "Wildlife Watching"
