= KZYX =

KZYX and KZYZ
KZYX: Philo, California; KZYZ: Willits, California; United States
- Frequencies: KZYX: 90.7 MHz; KZYZ: 91.5 MHz

Programming
- Format: Community Radio
- Affiliations: NPR; Pacifica; PRX

Ownership
- Owner: Mendocino County Public Broadcasting

History
- First air date: KZYX: 1989; KZYZ: 1995

Technical information
- Licensing authority: FCC
- Facility ID: KZYX: 41157
- Class: KZYX: B; KZYZ: B
- ERP: KZYX: 3,400 watts; KZYZ: 1,700 watts
- HAAT: KZYX: 514.0 meters (1,686.4 ft); KZYZ: 544 meters (1,785 ft)
- Transmitter coordinates: KZYX: 39°01′22″N 123°31′17″W; KZYZ: 39°19′34.5″N 123°16′14″W
- Translator(s): KZYX: 88.1 K201HR (Fort Bragg)

Links
- Public license information: KZYX: Public file; LMS
- Website: kzyx.org

KZYX (90.7 FM) is an NPR member station licensed to Philo, California, United States. The studios are located at 9300 Highway 128 in Philo, CA, and the transmitter is located on Cold Springs Mountain (near Philo, CA) in the State of California Department of Forestry and Fire Protection (CDF) radio facility.

It maintains a satellite station KZYZ 91.5 FM in Willits, and Ukiah, and translator K201HR 88.1 FM in Fort Bragg.

KZYX is a non profit community radio station located in rural northern California. Serving all of Mendocino county and reaching into Lake county, northern Sonoma county, and southern Humboldt county since 1989. Also streaming online at KZYX.org and on the KZYX app.

== See also ==
- List of community radio stations in the United States
