= Robert Mailer Anderson =

American novelist

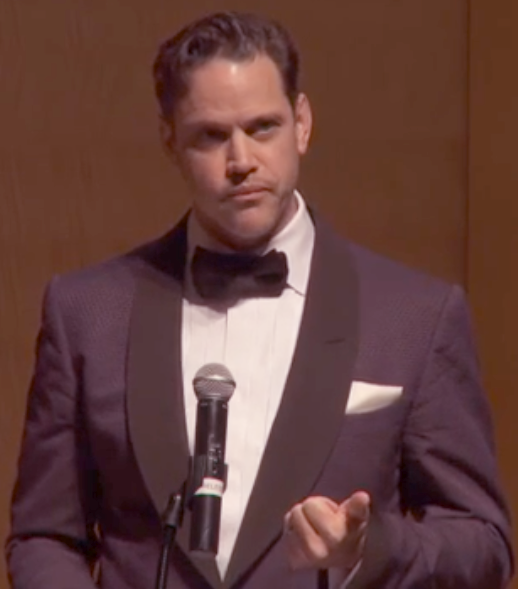
- Speaking at the San Francisco Public Library in 2017
- Born: 1968 (age 57–58); San Francisco, California, U.S.
- Occupation: Novelist
- Spouse: Nicola Miner
- Writing career
- Notable works: Boonville; The Death of Teddy Ballgame (play); Windows on the World (film)

Robert Mailer Anderson (born 1968) is an American novelist, screenwriter, playwright, Grammy-nominated producer and activist. He is the author of the bestselling novel Boonville, which takes place in the Northern California town of Boonville, and the 2016 play The Death of Teddy Ballgame. He is a contributor to the Anderson Valley Advertiser. Anderson is a three-time San Francisco Library Laureate, and in 2016 he was presented the San Francisco Arts Medallion for his outstanding leadership in the arts. In August 2020, Anderson was appointed to the California Humanities Board of Directors by Governor Gavin Newsom.

== Family background ==
Anderson was born in San Francisco. He is a ninth-generation native of California. Anderson and his two siblings were raised by divorced blue-collar parents. As a young man he spent five years living with his father at Grapevine Group Home for juvenile delinquents and disturbed youth, where his father was the director. He also spent time at his father's prior workplace, Fern Hill School, run by his uncle Bruce Anderson, where residents included future serial killer David Mason and Darrell Waters, who murdered one of the Fern Hill counselors. Bruce Anderson is the publisher of the Anderson Valley Advertiser for which Robert has been a contributor since 1984 and a fiction editor. During his time as fiction editor, Anderson attracted talents like Daniel Handler, Sandow Birk, Floyd Salas and Michelle Tea.

== Writing career ==
Anderson's short story "36-28-34-7" was published by Christopher Street in 1995. Boonville was published in 2001 by Bay Area independent publisher Creative Arts Book Publishing, and was then picked up for paperback reprint by HarperCollins.

In 2007 he co-wrote, produced, and appeared in Pig Hunt, a horror film set in Northern California.

Anderson's play The Death of Teddy Ballgame was published by San Francisco publishing press Molotov Editions in 2016.

Anderson is co-writer and producer of the film Windows on the World, starring Ryan Guzman and Edward James Olmos, as well as a graphic novel of the same name, based on the screenplay and published by Fantagraphics Books.

My Fairy Godfather is the second graphic novel Anderson has written with art by Jon Sack published by Fantagraphics Books in 2024. Both graphic novels My Fairy Godfather (under the title Mon Parrain Le Bonne Fée) and Windows on the World were translated into French and published by Komics Initiative.

== Personal life ==
Anderson lives in San Francisco. Married to the heiress Nicola Miner (daughter of Oracle Corporation cofounder Bob Miner), he is a former board member of the San Francisco Opera, and SFJAZZ. During his ten years on the SFJAZZ board, Anderson spearheaded the $65 million campaign to build the SFJAZZ Center, the first freestanding building for jazz performance and education in America. Anderson named the campaign "The World is Listening" and the phrase was later used to promote the 55th Annual GRAMMY Awards. On February 16, 2012, he and his wife hosted Barack Obama's fundraising visit to San Francisco, at their home in Pacific Heights. Singer Al Green, bassist Les Claypool, harmonica player Charlie Musselwhite and R&B musician Booker T. Jones performed for the fundraiser. Anderson was named the Colonial Standard Bearer for the 2013 Selkirk Common Riding in Selkirk, Scotland. His great-grandfather, Robert "Honolulu Bob" Anderson was a founder of the Colonial Society and received the same honor as Colonial Standard Bearer one hundred years prior, in 1913.

== Activism ==
In June 2004, Anderson created an anti-Iraq War poster campaign which juxtaposed an Abu Graib prisoner, the American Flag, and the slogan "Got Democracy?". The poster became part of the collection at Center for the Study of Political Graphics in Los Angeles. and the Smithsonian Institution.

In 2019, Anderson funded Ishmael Reed's The Haunting of Lin-Manuel Miranda and played the role of historian Ron Chernow for the first four staged readings that took place in January 2019 at Nuyorican Poets Cafe.

== Selected works ==
Books

- Boonville (Creative Arts Book Company, 2001) (reprinted, HarperCollins, 2003)
- The Death of Teddy Ballgame (play) (Molotov Editions, 2016)
- Windows On The World (graphic novel) (Fantagraphics 2020)
- My Fairy Godfather (graphic novel) (Fantagraphics 2024)

Films

- Pig Hunt
- Windows on the World

Albums

- (Executive Producer) SFJAZZ Collective: The Songs of Stevie Wonder. Winner of Outstanding Jazz Album at 45th Annual NAACP Image Awards.
- (Honorary Producer) SFJAZZ Collective: Live 2006 3rd Annual Concert Tour.
- (Honorary Producer) SFJAZZ Collective: Live 2007 4th Annual Concert Tour.
- (Executive Producer) Edward Simon: Venezuelan Suite (2014).
- (Executive Producer) Edward Simon: Latin American Songbook (2015) Winner of Outstanding Jazz Album at 48th Annual NAACP Image Awards.
- (Executive Producer) Miguel Zenón: Tipico. 2017 Grammy nominee for Best Latin Jazz Album 2018 Grammy nominee for Best Latin Jazz Album
- (Associate Producer) Miguel Zenón: Identities Are Changeable. 2017 Latin Grammy nominee for Best Latin Jazz Album.
- (Executive Producer) David Sánchez: Carib. Nominated for Best Latin Jazz Album at the 62nd Annual Grammy Awards and for Outstanding Jazz Album at 51st Annual NAACP Image Awards.
- (Executive Producer) Windows on the World: Original Motion Picture Soundtrack.
