= Anderson Valley Brewing Company =

Brewery in Boonville, California

Coordinates: 39.0011°N 123.3560°W

- Industry: Alcoholic beverage
- Founded: 1987
- Headquarters: Boonville, California, United States
- Products: Beer
- Production output: 55,000 barrels (2016)
- Owner: Jason McConnell
- Website: http://www.avbc.com/

Anderson Valley Brewing Company is a brewery founded in 1987 in Boonville, California. Its name is derived from its Anderson Valley location in Mendocino County.

== History ==
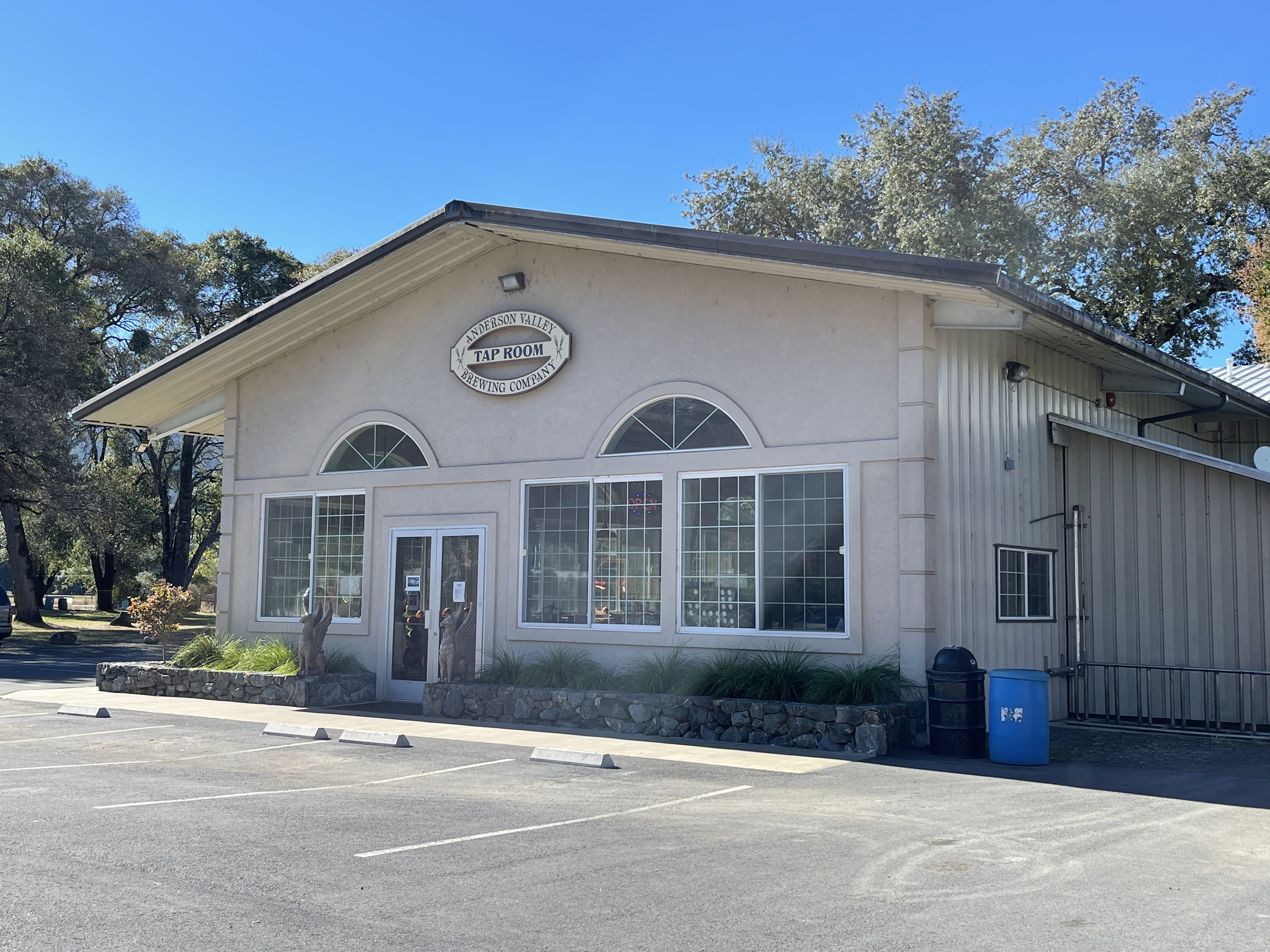
Anderson Valley Brewing Company's tap room.

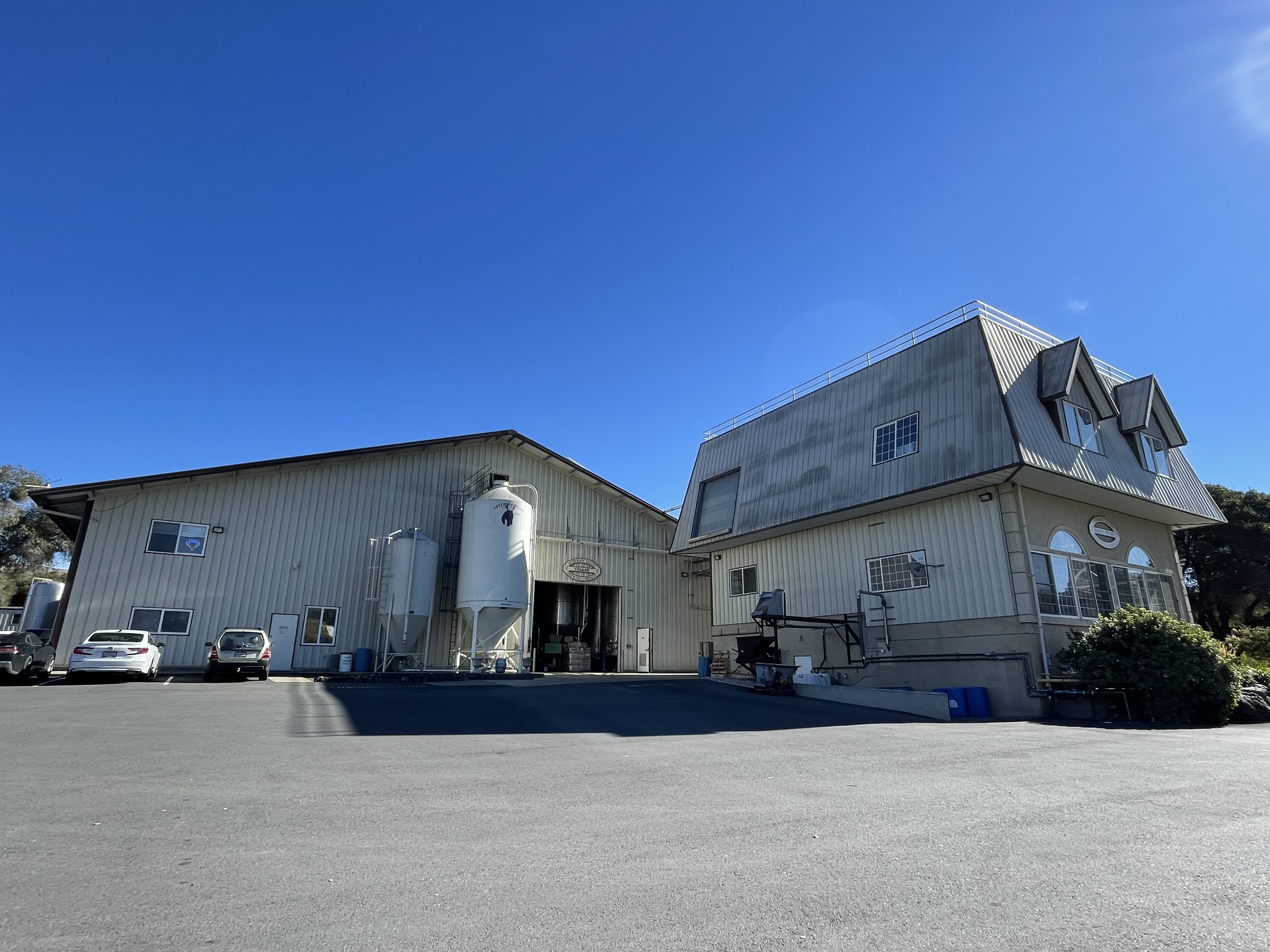
Anderson Valley Brewing Company's brewery.

Anderson Valley Brewing Company was founded in 1987 by David Norfleet and Kim and Ken Allen. At the time, it was one of just 20 craft breweries in the United States. The original 10-barrel brewhouse was designed and installed by owner and original brewer David Norfleet (and the 10 barrel brewery is still used for R&D brewing today). The original brewery was located in the lower level of the brewpub, The Buckhorn Saloon, in downtown Boonville. Early on the goal was to create outstanding ales, porters, and stouts. In its first year the company produced approximately 600 barrels of beer.

In 1996 when the demand for their beers exceeded the capacity of the 10-barrel brewery below the pub, a 30-barrel facility was installed just a mile from downtown Boonville at the corner of Highways 128 and 253. This brewery saw them through a dramatic period of growth, which included the introduction of a 12-ounce bottling line. By 1998 production had reached 15,000 barrels annually and construction began on a three-story Bavarian-style brewhouse. Two vintage brewhouses were installed, a 100-barrel and an 85-barrel. These all copper "onion dome" brewhouses had been rescued from two defunct German breweries during a trip to Europe in 1995. The new brewhouse went online and started producing beer once again in August 2000.

In April 2010 the brewery sold to industry veteran Trey White, the former executive vice president of United States Beverage, and two silent partners. In September of that year Fal Allen (former general manager 2000–2004, no relation to previous owners) returned to the brewery as brewmaster. White introduced the Bahl Hornin' (Boontling for "good drinking") Series, expanded the barrel aged and sour beer programs, and increased brewing capacity. In 2016, the brewery produced about 55,000 barrels of beer.

In December 2019 the brewery was sold to the McGee Family and beer and wine industry veteran Kevin McGee assumed the role of President and CEO.

In March 2025 the brewery was sold to local entrepreneur Jason McConnell.

== Beers ==
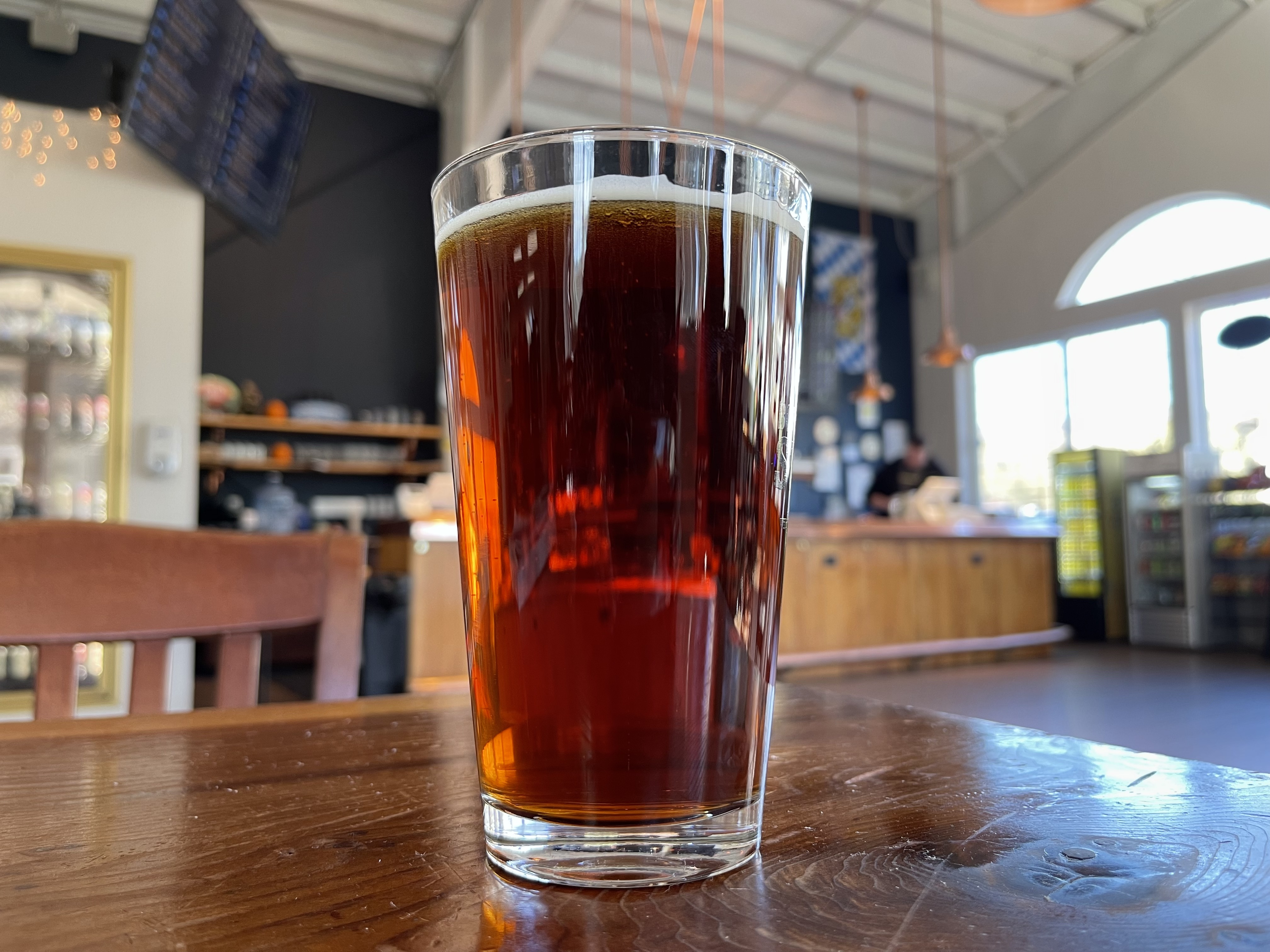
A glass of Winter Solstice Ale at the Anderson Valley Brewing Company tap room.

Anderson Valley Brewing Company's main lineup of beers includes Boont Amber Ale, Poleeko Pale Ale and Barney Flats Oatmeal Stout. Hop Ottin' IPA was added in the mid 1990s. Additionally the brewery produces (in smaller quantities) Brother David's Belgian style Double and Triple, Heelch O'Hops Imperial IPA, and the Summer and Winter Solstice beers, as well as several barrel-aged sour beers. In 2012 they collaborated with Wild Turkey bourbon to release Anderson Valley Bourbon Barrel Stout. Other beers in the "Barl" series (Anderson Valley Beers aged in Wild Turkey Barrels) followed including Boont Barl and Huge Arker Imperial Stout. In 2014, they expanded into the gose style, releasing The Kimmie, The Yink, & The Holy Gose, Blood Orange Gose, and Briney Melon Gose.

Esquire magazine named Anderson's Boont Amber Ale as one of the "Best Canned Beers to Drink Now" in February 2012.

== Awards ==
Name	Style	Honors		
Name	Style	Year	Event	Award
Barney Flats	Stout	2010	World Beer Cup	Bronze
Barney Flats	Stout	2004	World Beer Cup	Silver
Barney Flats	Stout	2004	Great American Beer Festival	Bronze
Barney Flats	Stout	1990	Great American Beer Festival	Gold
Belk's	ESB	1996	Great American Beer Festival	Bronze
Belk's	ESB	1995	Great American Beer Festival	Gold
Belk's	ESB	1994	Great American Beer Festival	Gold
Black Light		2023	Brussels Beer Challenge	Silver
Black Rice Ale		2021	European Beer Star	Bronze
Brother David's Double		2014	World Beer Cup	Bronze
Brother David's Double		2011	Great American Beer Festival	Gold
Brother David's Double		2010	Great American Beer Festival	Silver
Brother David's Double		2008	Great American Beer Festival	Silver
Brother David's Double		2008	World Beer Cup	Bronze
Boont	Amber Ale	2003	Great American Beer Festival	Silver
Boont	Amber Ale	1998	Great American Beer Festival	Gold
Boont	Amber Ale	1995	Great American Beer Festival	Bronze
Deep Enders	Porter	1996	Great American Beer Festival	Bronze
High Rollers	Wheat Ale	2000	Great American Beer Festival	Gold
Hop Ottin'	India Pale Ale	2000	World Beer Cup	Bronze
Holy Gose	Gose	2022	World Beer Cup	Gold

== Marketing ==
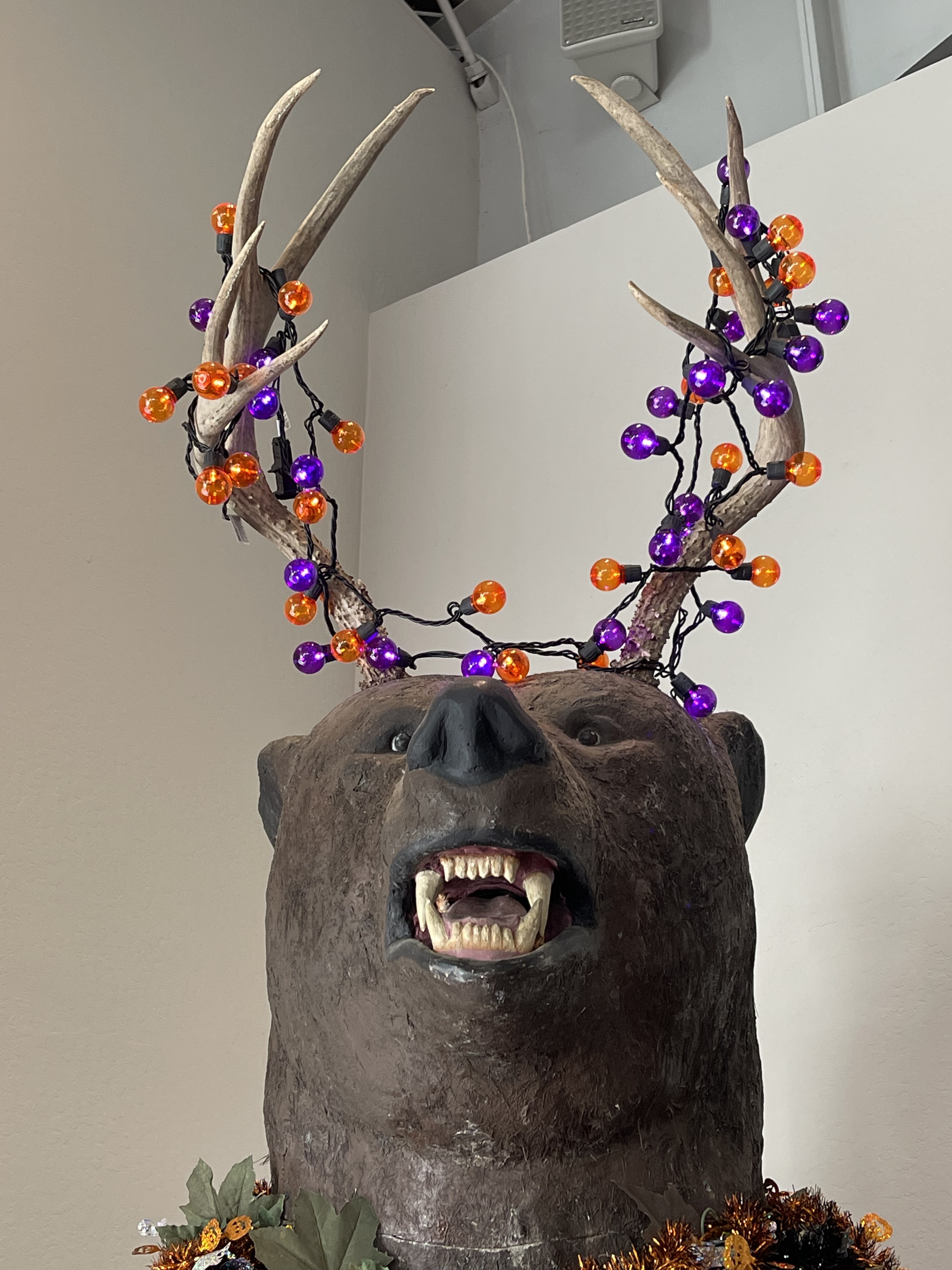
Barkley, the mascot of Anderson Valley Brewing Company, decorated for Halloween.

The brewery often uses words and phrases from the local Boontling lingo on their labels and packaging, as well as in some of their beer names (e.g. Hop Ottin').

Their packaging also features the company mascot, Barkley the "Legendary Boonville Beer". This fictional Anderson Valley native is part bear, part deer and looks like a bear with antlers. (Bear+Deer = Beer)

== Visitors ==
In 2004 the brewery sold the Buckhorn Saloon and opened its own tasting room pub on the current brewery property, now known as the "Beer Park". The tap room has 20 beers on draft, many of which can not be found at any other location. The Beer Park is dog and family friendly and also has an 18-hole (DPA recognized) disc golf course. The tap room is generally open from 11:00 a.m. – 6:00 p.m. Course features are DGA Mach II baskets, par 3 all around, with distances ranging from about 200–350 ft, Ponds, trees, buildings, and oak groves as play hazards, and only small variations in elevation.

== Boonville Beer Festival ==
Since 1997, the brewery has hosted the Boonville Beer Festival. The festival is held annually each spring and featuring dozens of breweries from around North America, multi-stage live music performances and local foods. The festival has grown each year. In 2010 the festival hosted 80 breweries featuring over 250 beers and over 6000 festival goers. The festival encourages people to consume responsibly and not to drive - there is camping available throughout the valley including over 100 camp sites at the county fair ground adjacent to the festival proper and the local senior center offers free mini bus transportation between the festival grounds and local camp sites. All the proceeds from the festival are donated to local charities. As of 2020 the festival has raised and donated over $1,750,000.00 to local charities.

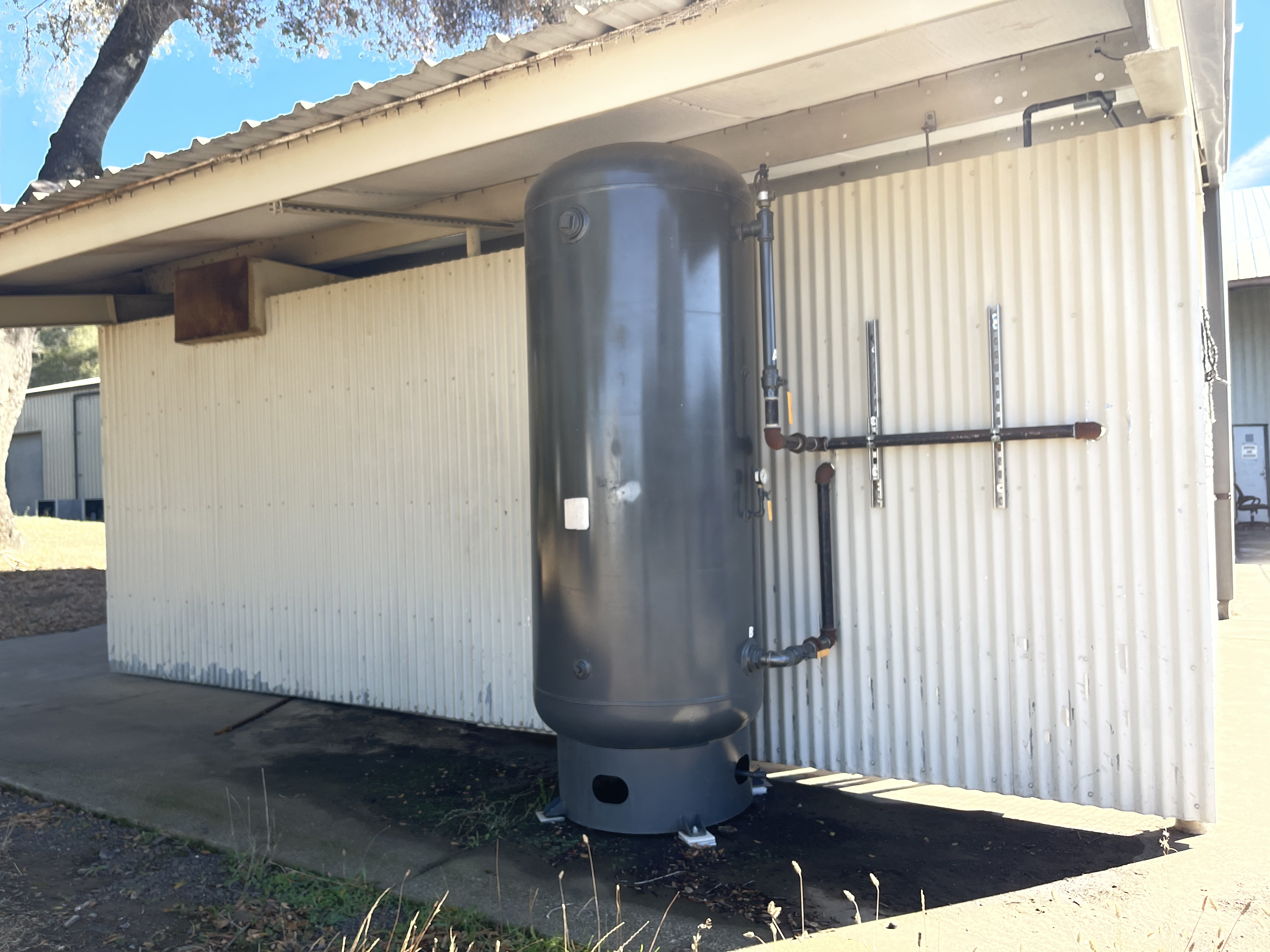
The brewery's nitrogen generator.

== Environmental efforts ==
Anderson Valley Brewing company is the World's First Solar Powered brewery. In 2005, the brewery installed an $860,000 photovoltaic solar array which provides near half of the company's electrical needs with a peak of 125 kilowatts of solar power. The brewery recycles its plastic wrap, paper, cardboard, steel, glass, plastic bottles and aluminium cans. Anderson Valley Brewing Company has been a five time WRAP Award Winner in 2000, 2001, 2003, 2004, 2005. The Waste Reduction Awards Program (WRAP) recognizes California businesses for their outstanding waste reduction efforts.

Organic waste is recycled. Like many breweries, the spent grain, hops and yeast are all used by local farmers for animal feed and composting. The brewery also operates its own wastewater treatment plant. The brewery's effluent waste water after treatment is used for irrigation on the brewery's 28 acres.

== See also ==
- List of breweries in California
- Beer in the United States
- Barrel-aged beer
