= Roederer Estate =

- Location: Philo, California, USA
- Appellation: Anderson Valley
- Founded: 1982
- Key people: Arnaud Weyrich, Winemaker
- Parent company: Champagne Louis Roederer
- Known for: California Sparkling Wine
- Varietals: Pinot noir, Chardonnay
- Tasting: Open to the public
- Website: roedererestate.com

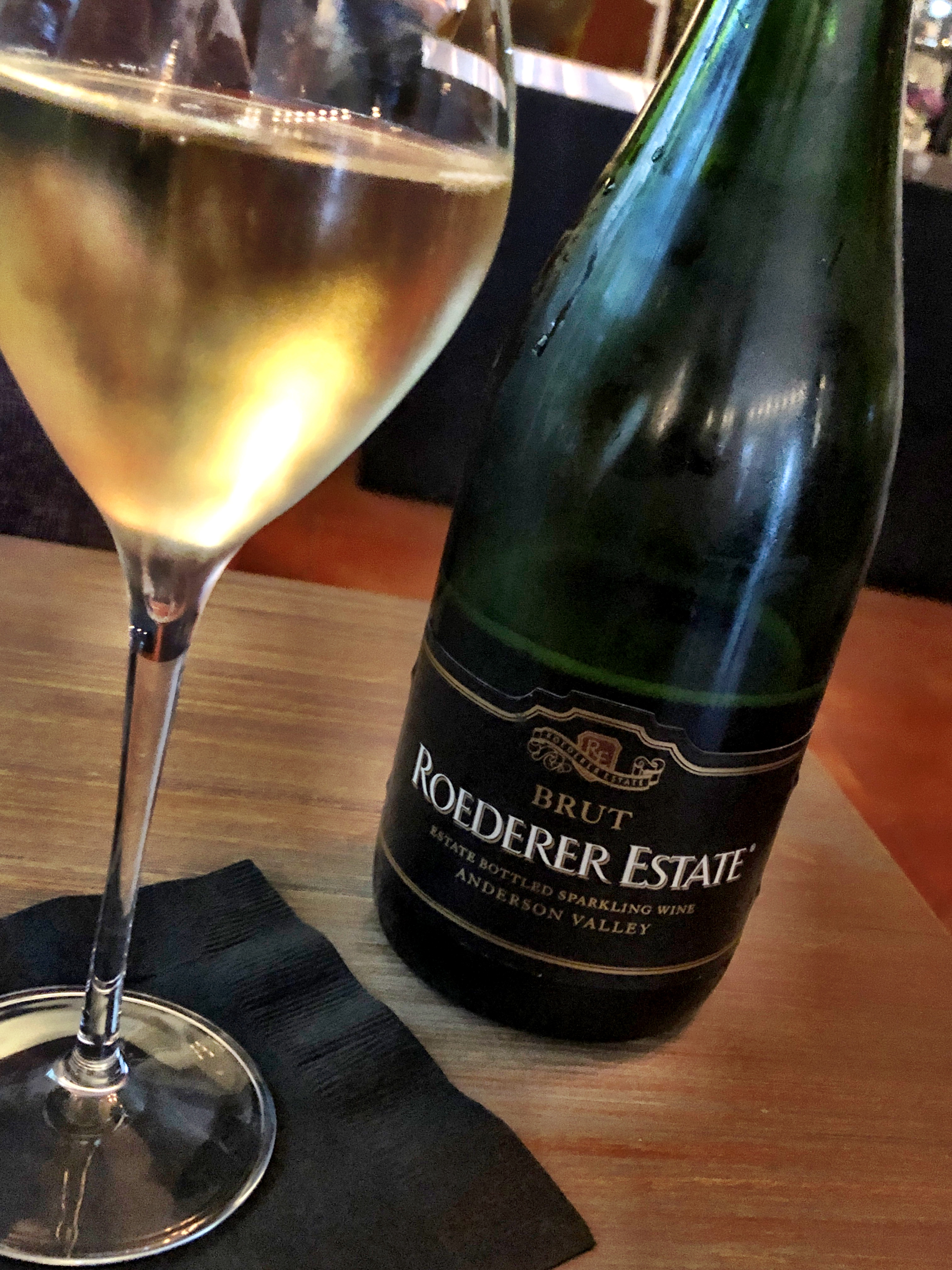
Roederer Estate's flagship Brut sparkling wine.

Roederer Estate is a California winery founded in 1982 by Jean-Claude Rouzaud, then president of its parent company, Champagne Louis Roederer. It produces estate-bottled sparkling wines from Mendocino County's cool, fog-shrouded Anderson Valley. As the California outpost of Champagne Louis Roederer, Roederer Estate winery is considered one of the top sparkling wine producers in the United States.

Roederer Estate's sparkling wines are produced using estate-grown grapes exclusively from the winery's own 580-acre (230 ha) vineyard and special oak-aged reserve wines are added to each blend. The winery produces four sparkling wines: the multi-vintage Roederer Estate Anderson Valley Brut, debuted in 1988, the Brut Rosé and Roederer Estate's vintage têtes de cuvée, L'Ermitage and L'Ermitage Rosé. All distribution for Roederer Estate is managed by the company Maisons Marques & Domaines.
