= Boonville, California =

Boonville
- Census-designated place
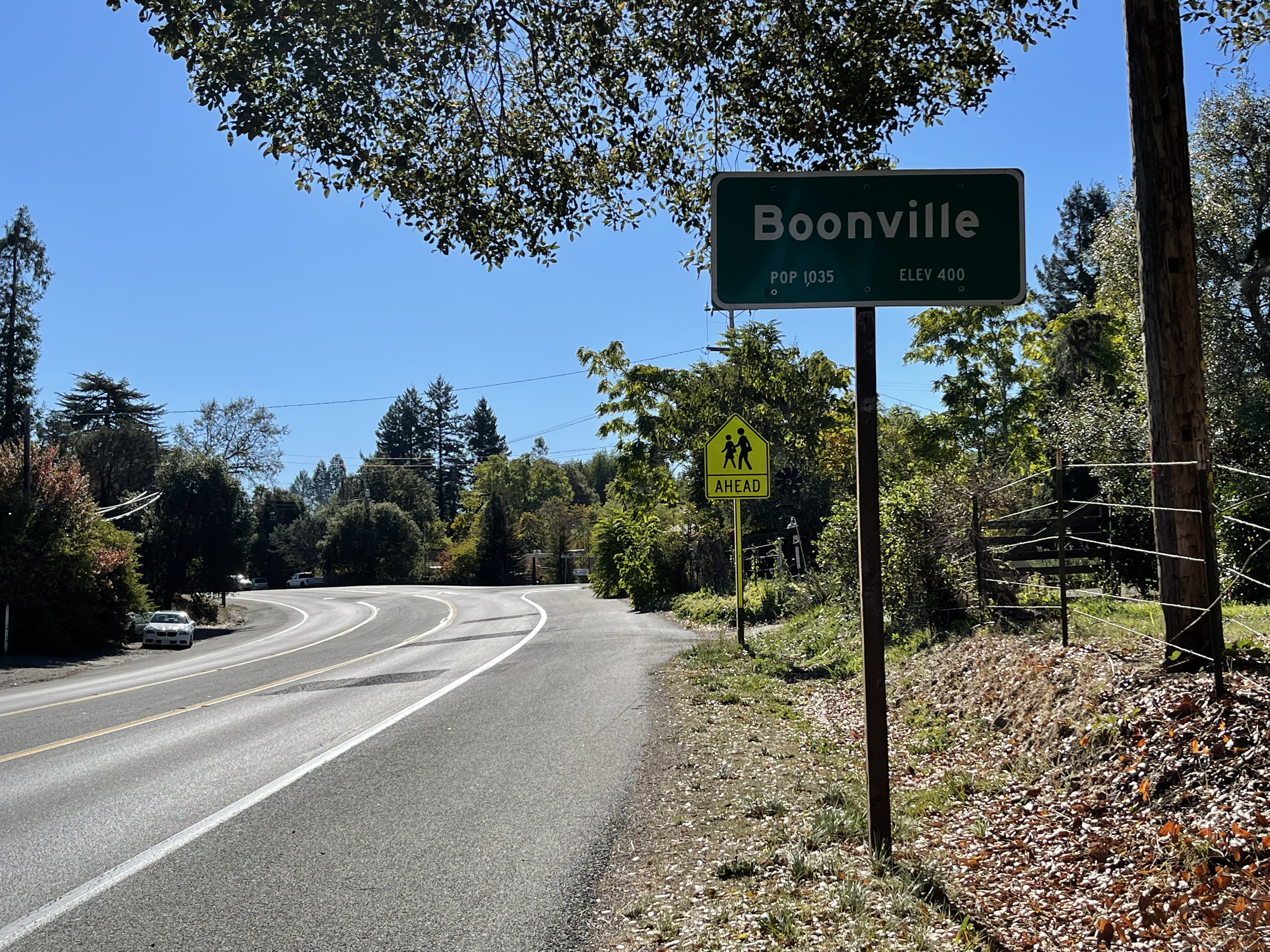
- Boonville, California

- Location in Mendocino County and California

- Location within California Location within the United States
- Coordinates: 39°00′33″N 123°21′58″W
- Country: United States
- State: California
- County: Mendocino

Area
  - Total: 5.54 sq mi (14.3 km^{2})
  - Land: 5.54 sq mi (14.3 km^{2})
  - Water: 0.00 sq mi (0 km^{2}) 0%
- Elevation: 381 ft (116 m)

Population (2020)
  - Total: 1,018
  - Density: 183.66/sq mi (70.91/km^{2})
- Time zone: UTC-8 (Pacific (PST))
  - Summer (DST): UTC-7 (PDT)
- ZIP Code: 95415
- Area code: 707
- GNIS feature IDs: 1658110; 2628712

Boonville (formerly The Corners and Kendall's City) is a census-designated place (CDP) in Mendocino County, California, United States. It is located 12.5 miles (20 km) southwest of Ukiah, at an elevation of 381 feet (116 m). The population was 1,018 at the 2020 census.

== History ==
Boonville was founded by John Bregartes in 1862. It was originally called "The Corners". Bregartes built a hotel there, and in 1864 Alonzo Kendall built another. The town became known as "Kendall's City". W.W. Boone bought a store in town and gave the place its current name.

The first post office opened in 1875, having been transferred from Anderson.

== Geography ==
Boonville is in southern Mendocino County, in the Anderson Valley, 115 miles (185 km) north of San Francisco. State Route 128 passes through the town, leading southeast 28 miles (45 km) to U.S. Route 101 at Cloverdale and northwest the same distance to the Pacific Ocean near Albion. State Route 253 leads east from Boonville 17 miles (27 km) to Route 101 near Ukiah.

According to the United States Census Bureau, the Boonville CDP covers an area of 5.5 square miles (14 km^{2}), all land. The town is drained by Anderson Creek, a northwestward-flowing tributary of the Navarro River, which leads to the Pacific Ocean near Albion.

=== Climate ===
The region experiences warm (but not hot) and dry summers, with no average monthly temperatures above 71.6 °F (22.0 °C). According to the Köppen Climate Classification system, Boonville has a warm-summer Mediterranean climate, abbreviated Csb on climate maps.

Climate data for Boonville, California, 39.0092°N 123.3661°W, 381 feet (116 m)
Month	Jan	Feb	Mar	Apr	May	Jun	Jul	Aug	Sep	Oct	Nov	Dec	Year
Mean daily maximum °F (°C)	58.0 (14.4)	60.2 (15.7)	63.7 (17.6)	67.9 (19.9)	74.5 (23.6)	81.5 (27.5)	88.2 (31.2)	88.1 (31.2)	86.1 (30.1)	78.0 (25.6)	64.3 (17.9)	57.4 (14.1)	72.3 (22.4)
Daily mean °F (°C)	48.7 (9.3)	50.2 (10.1)	52.8 (11.6)	55.9 (13.3)	61.1 (16.2)	66.4 (19.1)	70.7 (21.5)	70.5 (21.4)	68.5 (20.3)	62.5 (16.9)	53.2 (11.8)	48.0 (8.9)	59.0 (15.0)
Mean daily minimum °F (°C)	39.4 (4.1)	40.2 (4.6)	41.9 (5.5)	43.8 (6.6)	47.6 (8.7)	51.4 (10.8)	53.2 (11.8)	52.9 (11.6)	51.0 (10.6)	47.1 (8.4)	42.1 (5.6)	38.6 (3.7)	45.8 (7.7)
Average precipitation inches (mm)	7.00 (178)	6.83 (173)	5.66 (144)	2.58 (66)	1.29 (33)	0.38 (9.7)	0.03 (0.76)	0.04 (1.0)	0.12 (3.0)	1.62 (41)	4.26 (108)	8.09 (205)	37.9 (962.46)
Source: PRISM (spatially interpolated, 1991-2020 normals)

== Demographics ==
Historical population
Census	Pop.	Note	%±
2010	1,035		—
2020	1,018		−1.6%
U.S. Decennial Census; 1850–1870 1880-1890; 1900 1910 1920; 1930 1940 1950; 1960 1970 1980; 1990 2000 2010

=== 2020 census ===
As of the 2020 census, Boonville had a population of 1,018. The population density was 183.7 inhabitants per square mile (70.9/km^{2}), and the whole population lived in households. 0.0% of residents lived in urban areas, while 100.0% lived in rural areas.

The median age was 41.0 years. There were 210 people (20.6%) under the age of 18, 83 people (8.2%) aged 18 to 24, 271 people (26.6%) aged 25 to 44, 242 people (23.8%) aged 45 to 64, and 212 people (20.8%) who were 65 years of age or older. For every 100 females there were 103.2 males, and for every 100 females age 18 and over there were 108.8 males age 18 and over.

There were 357 households, out of which 89 (24.9%) had children under the age of 18 living in them. Of all households, 169 (47.3%) were married-couple households, 36 (10.1%) were cohabiting couple households, 84 (23.5%) had a female householder with no spouse or partner present, and 68 (19.0%) had a male householder with no spouse or partner present. About 93 households (26.1%) were made up of individuals, and 48 (13.4%) had someone living alone who was 65 years of age or older. The average household size was 2.85. There were 228 families (63.9% of all households).

There were 400 housing units at an average density of 72.2 units per square mile (27.9 units/km^{2}). Of the 400 housing units, 357 (89.3%) were occupied and 43 (10.8%) were vacant. Of occupied units, 165 (46.2%) were owner-occupied and 192 (53.8%) were occupied by renters. The homeowner vacancy rate was 4.1%, and the rental vacancy rate was 0.0%.

Racial composition as of the 2020 census
Race	Number	Percent
White	475	46.7%
Black or African American	4	0.4%
American Indian and Alaska Native	17	1.7%
Asian	3	0.3%
Native Hawaiian and Other Pacific Islander	0	0.0%
Some other race	172	16.9%
Two or more races	347	34.1%
Hispanic or Latino (of any race)	551	54.1%

=== 2010 census ===
Boonville first appeared as a census designated place in the 2010 U.S. census.

=== Income and poverty ===
In 2023, the US Census Bureau estimated that the median household income was $53,510, and the per capita income was $27,063. About 0.0% of families and 6.0% of the population were below the poverty line.

== Education ==
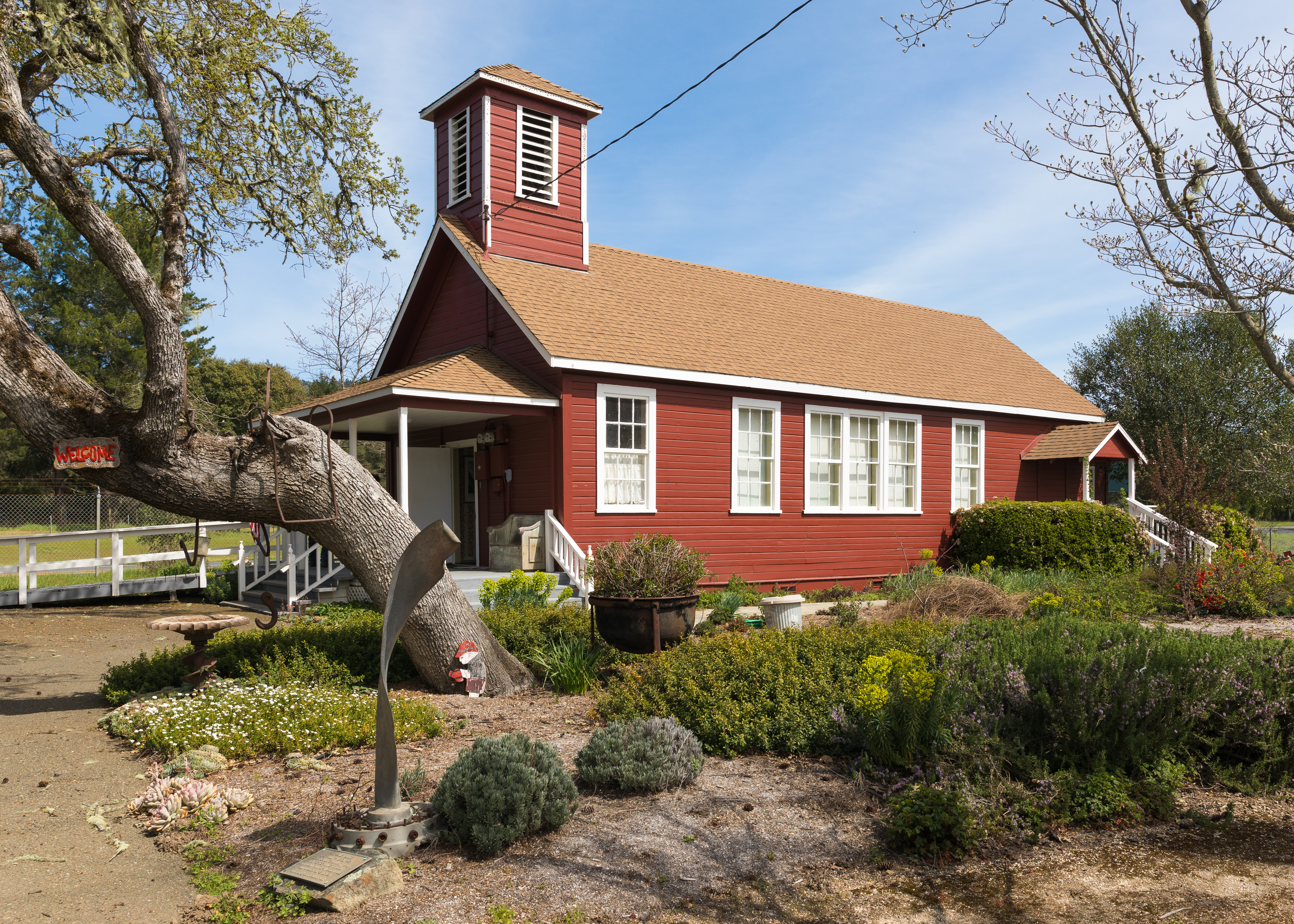
Historic Boonville schoolhouse

Elementary school students in Boonville attend Anderson Valley Elementary School. Middle and high school students attend Anderson Valley Junior-Senior High School. Both schools are located in Boonville.

== Politics ==
In the state legislature, Boonville is in the 2nd senatorial district, represented by Democrat Mike McGuire, and the 2nd Assembly district, represented by Democrat Chris Rogers.

Federally, Boonville is in California's 2nd congressional district, represented by Democrat Jared Huffman.

== Culture ==
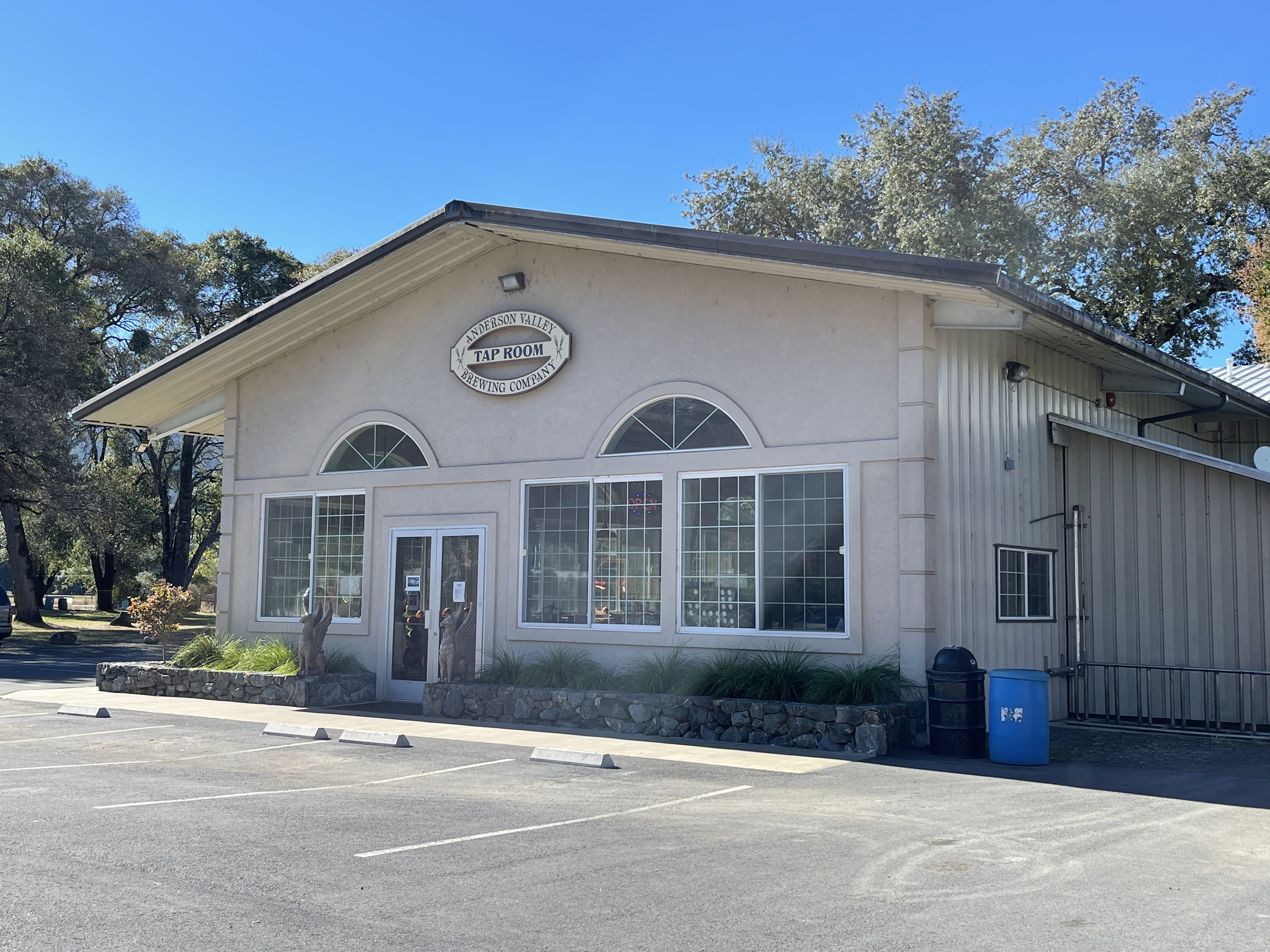
Anderson Valley Brewing Company's tap room

Boonville is best known as the source of the Boontling folk language. Bottles from the local Anderson Valley Brewing Company are labeled with the motto "Bahl Hornin'" which means "It's good drinkin'" in Boontling.

An Alsatian Varietals wine festival is held at the fairgrounds each February. In early spring (April or May), the annual Legendary Boonville Beer Festival is held at the fairgrounds, featuring beers from about 50 craft breweries. A Pinot Noir Festival is held in May. In July, the Wool-growers' Barbecue and Sheepdog Trials is held at the fairgrounds. Boonville hosts the annual Mendocino County Fair in September. Boonville also hosted the long-running Sierra Nevada World Music Festival every summer solstice weekend in June. Since the summer of 2024, the festival has no longer happened in Anderson Valley due to funding.

The apple cultivar known as Sierra Beauty is attributed to have been located on a mountainside by itself. Cuttings were made and grafted allowing the cultivar to survive. The Gowan family was one of the early growers that helped save this cultivar from extinction.

Boonville, despite its small population, has a minor reputation among political leftists in the United States for countercultural ideals, including promotion of organic food. The town serves as the setting for the novel Boonville (2001) by Robert Mailer Anderson and is mentioned in Sourdough (2017) by Robin Sloan. Some commentators believe Boonville may be the setting for the novel Vineland (1990) by Thomas Pynchon.

The town is known to Unificationists as the site of the successful but ill-fated Creative Community Project.

The ZIP Code is 95415. The community is inside area code 707.

The 2008 American science fiction action horror thriller film Pig Hunt is set and shot in Boonville.

The 2016 Western film Boonville Redemption is set in Boonville in 1906.

Boonville is home of the Boonville stomp, a dance invented by a forestry worker named Maudie in the early 1900s. Les Claypool has a song called "Boonville Stomp" on his album Of Fungi and Foe which was also featured in the film Pig Hunt and includes a shout-out to the film's producer and writer Robert Mailer Anderson.

== Notable residents ==
- Robert Mailer Anderson, novelist, screenwriter, playwright and activist; 1987 graduate of Anderson Valley High School
- René Auberjonois, Emmy award-nominated actor, former resident
- Gabriela Lena Frank, award-winning composer (Latin Grammy, Guggenheim, USA Artist) and Grammy-nominated pianist
- Martin Tevaseu, football player for the Indianapolis Colts
- In the spring of 1968 a number of Manson Family members lived for a few months in a residence between Boonville and Philo. Due to drug accusations the residence was raided on June 24 and the inhabitants were arrested. Among the accused were Mary Brunner, Ella Jo Bailey, Susan Atkins and Patricia Krenwinkel. After the Boonville raid they left the area.

== See also ==
- Boontling
- Boont ale
