= Mendocino Complex Fire =

2018 wildfire in Northern California

- Part of the 2018 California wildfires
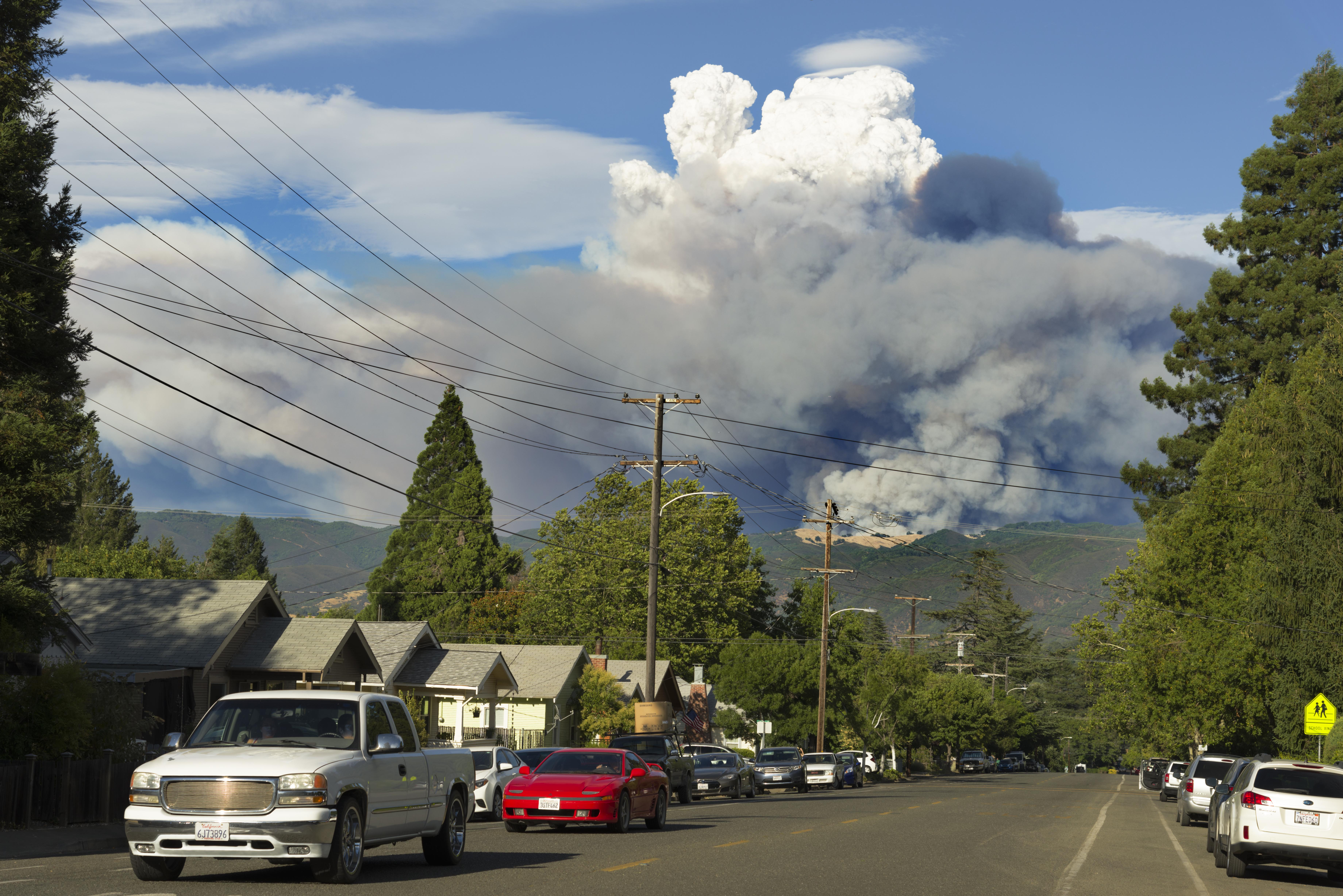
- Pyrocumulonimbus rising above the Mendocino Complex, as viewed from Ukiah, California, on July 29, 2018
- Date: July 27, 2018 –; January 4, 2019
- Location: Northern California, United States: Mendocino County; Lake County; Colusa County; Glenn County
- Coordinates: 39.243283°N 123.103367°W

Statistics
- Burned area: 459,123 acres (1,858 km^{2})

Impacts
- Deaths: 1 firefighter
- Injuries: 4 firefighters
- Structures destroyed: 280
- Cost: ≥$257 million (2018 USD)

Ignition
- Cause: Ranch Fire caused by a man trying to plug the entrance of a wasp nest with a hammer and stake; River Fire cause undetermined

Map
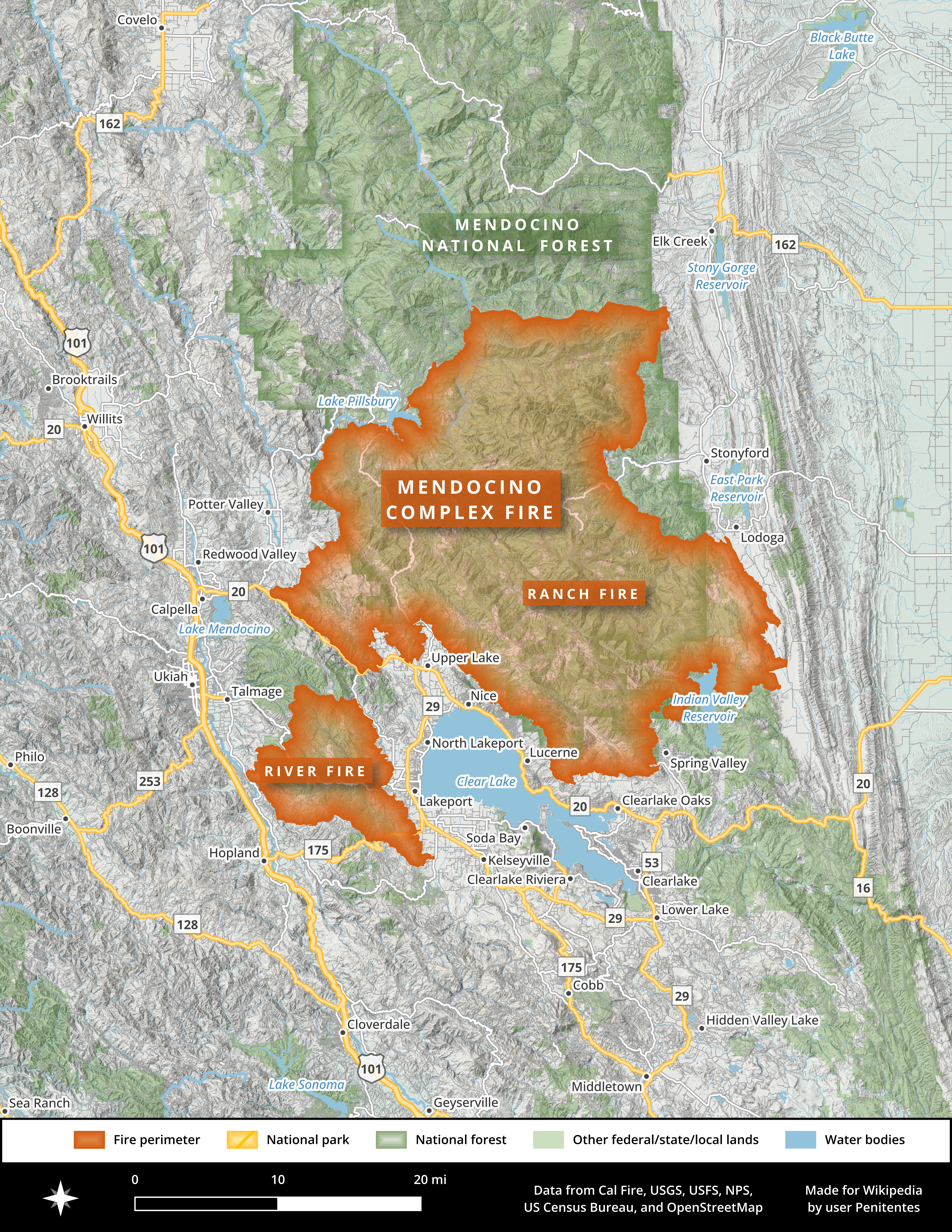
- The extent of the Mendocino Complex Fire

- Location within California

Location of Mendocino Complex Fire

Perimeter of the Mendocino Complex fire

The Mendocino Complex Fire was a large complex of wildfires that burned in northern California for more than three months in 2018. It consisted of two wildfires, the River Fire and Ranch Fire, which burned in Mendocino, Lake, Colusa, and Glenn Counties in California. The Ranch Fire burned eight miles northeast of Ukiah, and the River Fire burned six miles north of Hopland, to the south of the larger Ranch Fire. First reported on July 27, 2018, both fires burned a combined total of 459,123 acres (1,858 km^{2}), before they were collectively 100% contained on September 18, though hotspots persisted until the complex was fully brought under control on January 4, 2019. The Ranch Fire alone burned 410,203 acres (1,660 km^{2}), making it the largest wildfire in modern California history at the time until the August Complex fire that occurred in 2020. The Ranch Fire also surpassed the size of the 315,577-acre Rush Fire, which burned across California and Nevada, as well as the Santiago Canyon Fire of 1889, which was previously believed to have been California's all-time largest wildfire. (Note: California fire records prior to 1932 are less reliable, according to the California Department of Forestry and Fire Protection.)

The fires collectively destroyed 280 structures while damaging 37 others; causing at least $257 million (2018 USD) in damages, including $56 million in insured property damage and $201 million (2018 USD) in fire suppression costs. The city of Lakeport, communities of Kelseyville, Lucerne, Upper Lake, Nice, Saratoga Springs, Witter Springs, Potter Valley, and Finley, parts of Hopland, and the tribal communities of Hopland Rancheria, Big Valley Rancheria, and Habematolel Pomo of Upper Lake were evacuated.

The smaller River Fire was the first fire in the complex to be contained, reaching full containment on August 13, while the Ranch Fire continued to burn for more than a month after that, with flames on the northern flank of the Ranch Fire pushing eastward from the Snow Mountain Wilderness into Glenn County. The Ranch Fire finally reached full containment during the evening of September 18. However, the Ranch Fire continued to burn deep within containment lines until November 7, when the fire was declared to be inactive.

== Progression ==
=== July ===
The Mendocino Complex comprised two vegetation fires that burned within miles of each other near Clear Lake, in Northern California. The first of the two fires reported was the Ranch Fire, which was reported on July 27, 2018, at 12:05 PM PDT, off Highway 20 near Potter Valley. Within hours of being reported, the fire had injured two firefighters. Approximately one hour later, the River Fire was reported on Old River Road, six miles north of Hopland, located south of the Ranch Fire. By the evening, the River Fire had burned 4,000 acres (16 km^{2}) and destroyed two buildings, including a home. According to a 2019 report, the Ranch Fire was started by a rancher who had inadvertently sparked dry grass while hammering a metal stake while trying to find a wasp nest.

The fire threatened the University of California Hopland Research and Extension Center. High heat, low humidity, and rugged terrain challenged control of the fires, with gusty winds causing both to grow. Overnight, five more firefighters were reported injured. By the next morning, the two fires were organized under the "Mendocino Complex" name. The River Fire had grown to 3,500 acres (14 km^{2}), the Ranch Fire had burned 6,000 acres (24 km^{2}), and both were at two percent containment, with 386 structures being threatened. With Red Flag Warnings in effect, the first mandatory evacuations began in Hopland and with residents along Highway 175. Mendocino College was named an evacuation center. By the afternoon, the community of Lakeport and additional areas of Lake County were placed under mandatory evacuation and, later that evening, Potter Valley and parts of Upper Lake were evacuated.

By the morning of July 29, three more structures had been destroyed, all houses. Dry and windy conditions persisted, and the lack of available firefighters due to other fires burning in the state slowed attempts at containment. The communities of Witter Springs, Finley, Saratoga Springs, Nice, Bachelor Valley, Scotts Valley, and Big Valley Rancheria were evacuated. The fires rapidly grew overnight, with the Ranch Fire totaling 35,076 acres (142 km^{2}) and the River Fire reaching 20,911 acres (85 km^{2}) by the morning of July 30, with the fires at 10 percent containment. Later in the afternoon of July 30, evacuation orders were lifted for Hopland, the Hopland Rancheria, and the area just north of Largo, while evacuation orders were put in place for Kelseyville and Finley. Containment of the fire declined to five percent as the fires grew in size. One more home was destroyed and one damaged.

Evacuation orders were lifted for Potter Valley in the afternoon of July 31. By the evening of July 31, the fires had burned a combined total of 80,408 acres (325 km^{2}) and were 12% contained.

=== August ===
The two fires continued to burn into August, with the Ranch Fire at 59,014 acres (239 km^{2}) and the River Fire at 31,898 acres (129 km^{2}) on August 1. The Ranch Fire remained at 15 percent containment, while the River Fire was at 38 percent containment. Containment line improvement remained the focus of fire crews, with some crews directly fighting the fire when conditions permitted. Additional crew support arrived from the US Forest Service. Throughout the day, both fires grew, with the Ranch Fire burning into the Mendocino National Forest and south of Lake Pillsbury. Overnight, the fires remained most active in higher elevations. By the morning of August 2, the two fires had burned a combined total of 110,168 acres (446 km^{2}) and were 39 percent contained. Mandatory evacuations were put in place in Western Lake County, particularly for areas west of Lucerne and north of Clear Lake. On the evening of August 4, the combined acreage was 229,000 acres. By the morning of August 5, the combined acreage was 271,172 acres (1,097 km^{2}), with 152 buildings destroyed. On the morning of August 6, the combined acreage was 273,664 acres (1,107 km^{2}), with 169 buildings damaged or destroyed. By the night of August 6, the combined acreage of the Mendocino Complex Fire was 283,800 acres (1,148 km^{2}), thus surpassing the Thomas Fire to become the largest wildfire complex in modern California history.

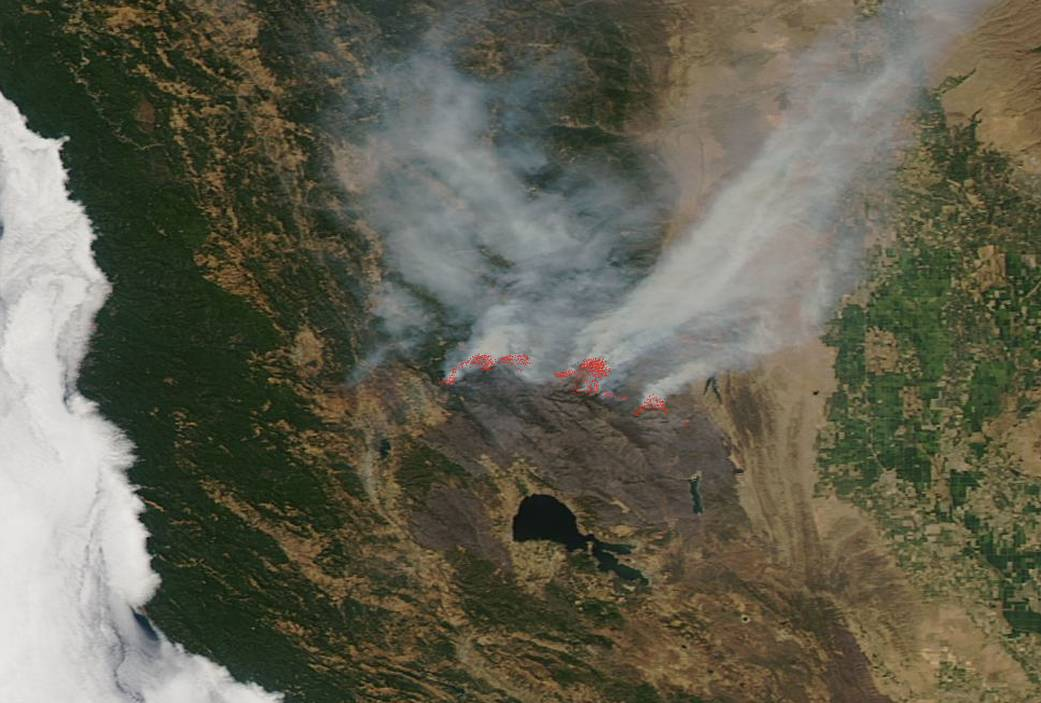
Satellite image of the Ranch Fire on August 15, 2018.

On August 7, 2018, officials announced that they predicted the Mendocino Complex would last through August and into early September, compared to the earlier prediction of mid-August. By then, the fire complex had destroyed 143 structures, 75 of them residences. By late August 7, the fire complex was 34% contained. Of the two fires, the Ranch and River Fires, the River Fire was 78% contained, while Ranch Fire was only 20% contained, with flames on the northern flank still pushing towards Snow Mountain Wilderness.

By the night of August 7, the combined acreage was 283,800 acres (1,148 km^{2}), with 169 buildings damaged or destroyed. By the morning of August 8, the fire had destroyed 221 buildings, while damaging another 27. By Wednesday morning, on August 8, 2018, the Mendocino Complex Fire had burned 300,086 acres (1,214 km^{2}) and was 47% contained. Cal Fire estimated that containing the entire fire complex could take until September 1, over a month after it ignited on July 27. By Thursday, August 9, 2018, the total area burned had grown to 302,086 acres. By Saturday morning, on August 11, 2018, the Mendocino Complex Fire had burned 325,226 acres (1,316 km^{2}), was 67% contained, and had destroyed 258 buildings. On the morning of Sunday, August 12, the Ranch Fire grew to 282,479 acres (1,143.15 km^{2}) and was only 62% contained, surpassing the Thomas Fire as California's single-largest modern wildfire. Meanwhile, the River Fire remained at 48,920 acres (198.0 km^{2}), with 93% containment, with the Mendocino Complex Fire having burned a total of 331,399 acres (1,341.12 km^{2}).

During the evening of Monday, August 13, the River Fire was fully contained at 48,920 acres (198.0 km^{2}), leaving the Ranch Fire as the only active fire within the Mendocino Complex. However, the larger Ranch Fire continued to expand. By the evening of August 14, the Ranch Fire had grown to 305,990 acres (1,238.3 km^{2}), with only 64% containment, increasing the size of the Mendocino Complex Fire to 354,910 acres (1,436.3 km^{2}), with a collective containment of 64%. Around that time, it was reported that the Ranch Fire had killed a firefighter from Utah. On August 16, the Ranch Fire grew to 317,117 acres (1,283.33 km^{2}), increasing the total burn area of the Mendocino Complex Fire to 366,037 acres (1,481.30 km^{2}); this allowed the Ranch Fire to surpass the size of the massive Rush Fire in 2012, which burned across California into Nevada, as well as the Santiago Canyon Fire of 1889, which was believed to have been California's all-time largest wildfire, estimated at 300,000 acres (1,200 km^{2}). By the morning of August 18, the Ranch Fire had reached 331,770 acres (1,342.6 km^{2}), with 76% containment, increasing the size of the Mendocino Complex Fire to 380,690 acres (1,540.6 km^{2}).

August 19 was a day of chaos wherein LAFD firefighters were surrounded and had to scramble through the forest to safety. A firefighter was flown to a burn center and another four were treated for burns. Another firefighter was treated for a dislocated shoulder.

On August 28, the Ranch Fire reached 410,182 acres (1,659.95 km^{2}) and was at 93% containment, increasing the Mendocino Complex Fire's burn area to 459,102 acres (1,857.92 km^{2}). On the same day, it was reported that the Ranch Fire had stopped its forward spread.

=== September ===
On September 1, InciWeb updated the Ranch Fire's size to 410,203 acres (1,660.03 km^{2}), with 96% containment, as the fire burned through previously unburned areas in interior regions, increasing the burn area of the Mendocino Complex Fire to 459,123 acres (1,858.00 km^{2}). Afterward, the Ranch Fire stopped growing, with containment of the Ranch Fire increasing to 98% by September 4. During the next couple of weeks, containment of the Ranch Fire remained at 98%, without any further growth in size, as the fire continued burning deep within the fire perimeter, within the northern portion of the burn area. On September 19, the U.S. Forest Service reported that the Ranch Fire had been fully contained during the evening of September 18, bringing both of the fires in the Mendocino Complex to full containment. However, InciWeb stated that the Ranch Fire was not out yet, as hotspots continued to smolder deep within the containment lines of the fire.

=== October – January ===
Hotspots continued to persist within the perimeter of the Ranch Fire for another few months. On November 7, 2018, InciWeb stopped issuing updates on the Mendocino Complex and declared the incident to be inactive. On January 4, 2019, Cal Fire reported that the Mendocino Complex had fully been brought under control, extinguishing the fire 160 days after it had started.

== Effects ==
The River and Ranch Fires impacted communities along the Mendocino and Lake County borders, prompting the evacuations of Lakeport, Kelseyville, Lucerne, Upper Lake, Nice, Saratoga Springs, Witter Springs, Potter Valley, Finley, parts of Hopland, and the tribal communities of Hopland Rancheria and Big Valley Rancheria.

=== Evacuations ===
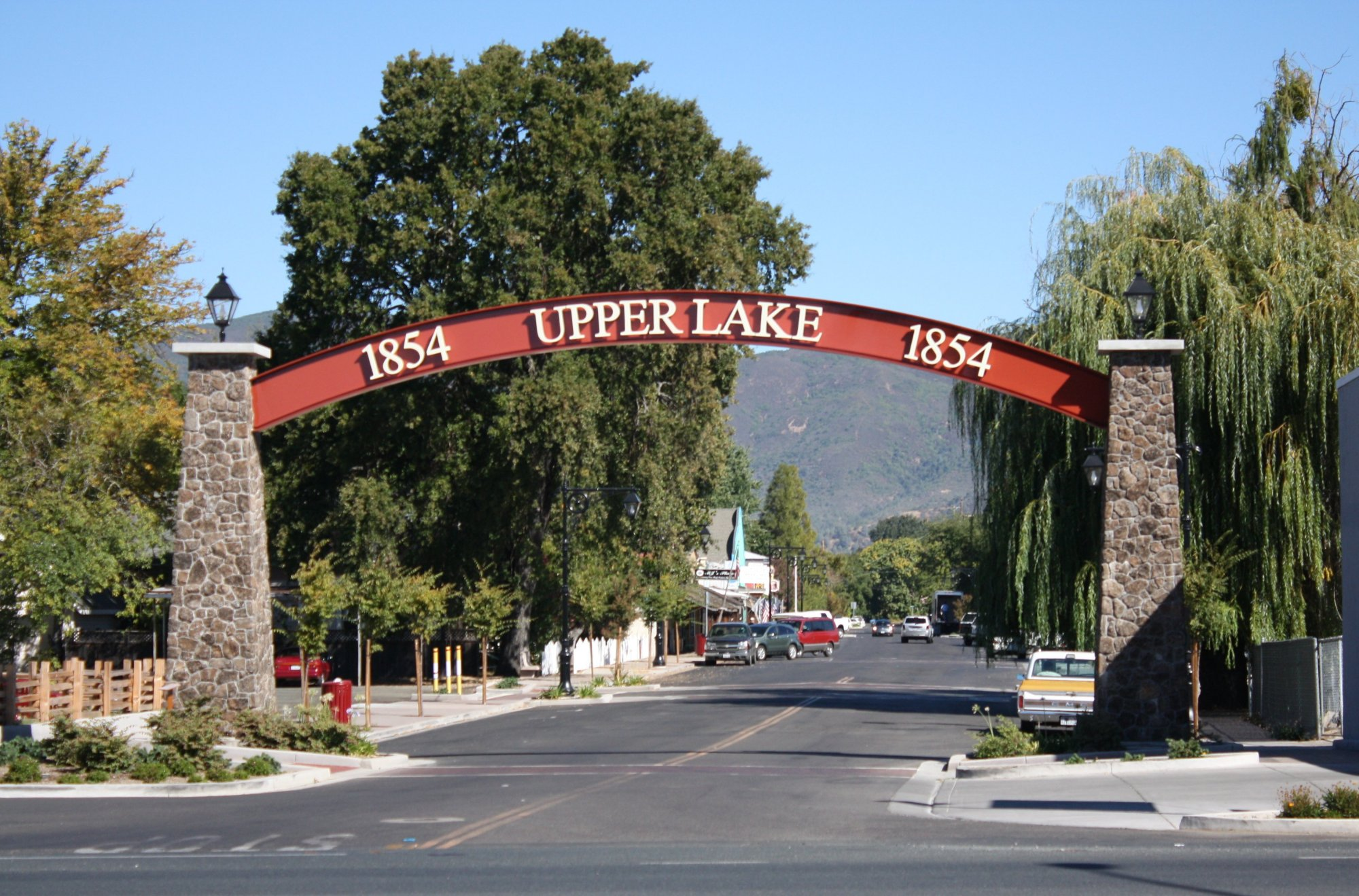
The community of Upper Lake was evacuated during the Mendocino Complex fires.

As of August 2, the following evacuations were in place:

Mendocino County

- Highway CA-20 area from one mile south of Highway CA-20, east of Potter Valley Road, south of the fire perimeter, and west of Mendocino-Lake County Line.

Lake County

- Western Lake County, the area west of Lucerne at Bartlett Springs Road and Highway CA-20, south of the fire, east of the fire, north of Clear Lake including the communities of Blue Lakes, Upper Lake, Nice, Lakeport, Witter Springs, Bachelor Valley, Scotts Valley, Saratoga Springs.

=== Transportation ===
Portions of Highway CA-20 were closed from July 29 to August 8. On August 8, at 11:00 AM PDT, Highway CA-20 was open from Highway US-101 to Highway I-5.

=== Animals ===
The NorCal Livestock Evacuation and Support organization, worked with farmers to help evacuate farm animals and domestic pets. The American Society for the Prevention of Cruelty to Animals (ASPCA) and Lake County Animal Care and Control, also worked on evacuating and caring for animals displaced by the wildfires, while checking residences for pets or livestock.

== Growth and containment ==
Fire containment status Gray: contained, Red: active
Date	Acres burned	Containment
Jul 27	5,000	
Jul 28	14,000	
Jul 29	30,500	
Jul 30	68,487	
Jul 31	80,408	
Aug 1	94,912	
Aug 2	125,168	
Aug 3	157,450	
Aug 4	229,006	
Aug 5	266,982	
Aug 6	273,664	
Aug 7	292,692	
Aug 8	302,086	
Aug 9	305,152	
Aug 10	312,447	
Aug 11	328,226	
Aug 12	336,395	
Aug 13	349,890	
Aug 14	354,910	
Aug 15	364,145	
Aug 16	370,294	
Aug 17	379,720	
Aug 18	383,690	
Aug 19	389,697	
Aug 20	400,477	
Aug 21	406,532	
Aug 22	410,482	
Aug 23	415,685	
Aug 24	424,419	
Aug 25	427,693	
Aug 26	450,985	
Aug 27–28	459,102	
Aug 29–31	459,102	
Sept 1	459,123	
Sept 2–3	459,123	
Sept 4–15	459,123	
Sept 16–17	---	---
Sept 18	459,123	

== See also ==
- 2018 California wildfires
- Santiago Canyon Fire
- Holy Fire (2018)
