= Mendocino AVA =

American Viticultural Area in Mendocino County, California

Coordinates: 39°14′56″N 123°12′28″W

Mendocino
- Wine region
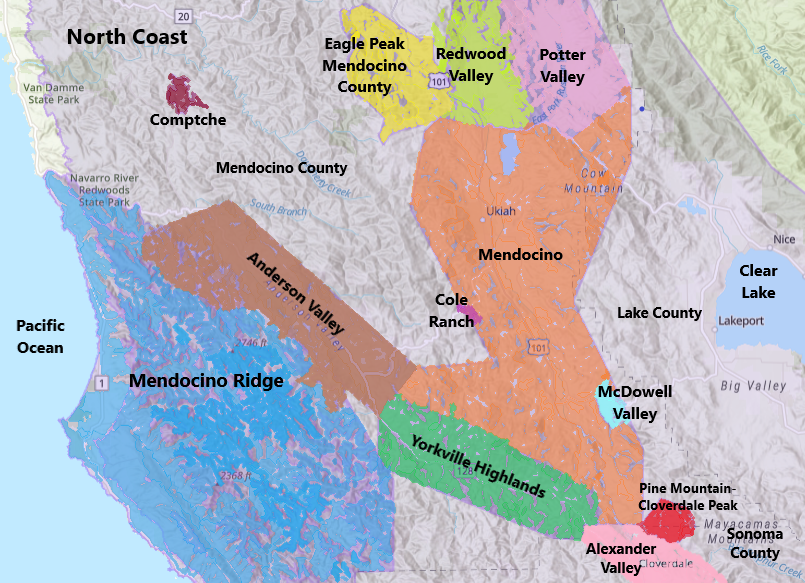
- Type: American Viticultural Area
- Year established: 1984; 1998 Amended; 2014 Amended
- Years of wine industry: 176
- Country: United States
- Part of: California, North Coast AVA, Mendocino County
- Other regions in California, North Coast AVA, Mendocino County: Eagle Peak Mendocino County AVA, Comptche AVA, Mendocino Ridge AVA, Pine Mountain-Cloverdale Peak AVA
- Sub-regions: Anderson Valley AVA, Cole Ranch AVA, Covelo AVA, Dos Rios AVA, McDowell Valley AVA, Potter Valley AVA, Redwood Valley AVA, Yorkville Highlands AVA
- Growing season: 268 days
- Climate region: Region III
- Heat units: 3,097 GDD units
- Precipitation (annual average): 39.42 in (1,001.3 mm)
- Total area: 275,200 acres (430 sq mi); 1998: 285,200 acres (446 sq mi) (+10,000); 2014: 283,300 acres (443 sq mi) (-1900)
- Size of planted vineyards: 10,596 acres (4,288 ha); 1998: 10,666 acres (4,316 ha); 2014: 10,786 acres (4,365 ha)
- No. of vineyards: 140
- Grapes produced: Arneis, Barbera, Cabernet Franc, Cabernet Sauvignon, Carignane, Charbono, Chardonnay, Chenin blanc, Colombard, Dolcetto, Grenache, Merlot, Montepulciano, Muscat Canelli, Nebbiolo, Negro Amaro, Nero d'Avola, Petit Verdot, Petite Sirah, Pinot blanc, Pinot gris, Pinot Meunier, Pinot noir, Pinotage, Riesling, Sangiovese, Sauvignon blanc, Sauvignon Musque, Semillon, Syrah, Tocai Friulano, Valdiguie, Viognier, Zinfandel
- No. of wineries: 132

Mendocino is an American Viticultural Area (AVA) located in Mendocino County, California within the vast 3.2-million-acre (5,000 sq mi) multi-county North Coast appellation. It was established as the nation's 66^{th}, the state's 40^{th} and the county's sixth AVA on June 15, 1984 by the Bureau of Alcohol, Tobacco and Firearms (ATF), Treasury after reviewing a petition submitted by Mr. James A. Beckman, vice-president of Guild Wineries and Distilleries, on behalf of 113 local viticulture industry members within the county, proposing a viticultural area named "Mendocino." The 283,300-acre (443 sq mi) viticultural area encompasses eight valleys including Anderson Valley, Potter Valley, Redwood Valley, Capella Valley, Ukiah Valley, Knights (McNab) Valley, Sanel Valley, and McDowell Valley where approximately 35,000 acres (55 sq mi) or 13 percent of the area is suitable for grape production. As of 2024, eight smaller sub-AVAs are nested within the Mendocino appellation that largely encompasses Mendocino County. The "Mendocino" name is synonymous with excellent wines, i.e., Carignan, Charbono, Grenache, Petite Sirah, Syrah and Zinfandel, that are sourced from the Mediterranean climate grapes cultivated in the area which for many years has been known as the "Mendocino" vintage. Anderson Valley, because of its cooler climate, is known for its Pinot noir and sparkling wine production. Many wineries in the adjacent Sonoma, Napa and Lake counties source Mendocino grapes to blend into vintages labeled with their appellations.

== History ==
Viticulture has been active in the Mendocino region since the earliest settlement in the mid-1800's. According to the Mendocino County Assessor's records, 25,000 grapevines, or about 40 acres (0.06 sq mi) had been planted by 1871. By 1910, grapes and wines from the area were listed as principal products of the county. At that time, there were 5,800 acres (9 sq mi) of grapes and nine wineries that produced 90,000 US gal (340,687 L) of wine in the Mendocino County. The most popular grape variety of the time was Zinfandel, and today it is still one of the major grape varieties grown in the area. In the early 1970s, large acreages of new vineyards were established within the area, and consequently, the number of wineries increased.

== Terroir ==
=== Topography ===
The Mendocino viticultural area encompasses cultivated agricultural areas in the southernmost one-third of Mendocino County. The Mendocino area is shaped like the letter "V" with two forks. It includes the watershed areas and drainage basins of both the Navarro and Russian Rivers. The eastern fork encompasses the Russian River watershed, starts at the headwaters of the Russian River and extends approximately 30 miles (48 km) south. At its widest point on the north end, the viticultural area is about 12 miles (19 km) wide, encompassing Redwood and Potter Valley with a hilly outcropping separating them. Its narrowest point just south of the middle is six miles (10 km) wide. The east fork is approximately 30 miles (48 km) inland from the Pacific Ocean and runs almost parallel to the coastline. The west fork of the viticultural area, consisting of agricultural areas found in both the Navarro and Russian River watersheds, starts approximately one mile (2 km) south of a fork in the Navarro River and extends southeast approximately 34 miles (55 km). At its widest point on the north end it is approximately eight miles (13 km) wide and in the middle at its narrowest point, it is four miles (6 km) wide. The west fork also runs parallel to the Pacific coastline, approximately 15 miles (24 km) inland. At its south end the west fork bends sharply to the east, joining the east fork at its southwestern boundary. The majority of AVA's vineyards are at elevations ranging from 250 to 1,100 feet (76–335 m), with some at 1,600 feet (488 m) on the hillsides in the area. The surrounding mountain ridges define the Upper Russian River and Navarro River drainage basins. These ridges, rising as high as 3,500 feet (1,067 m), are the natural boundaries of area climates referenced in the petition for the Mendocino viticultural area.

=== Climate ===
The Mendocino viticultural area is distinguished from surrounding areas by climate generally separating the coastal and interior climate areas and has a very unusual climate pattern. It lies in a climate area called "Transitional." The area is unusual in climate because either the coastal or the interior climates can dominate the Mendocino climate for either short or long periods of time. Generally this is reflected by a warmer winter and a cooler summer than the interior climate area east of the viticultural area. Also, it provides a grape growing season that has many warm, dry days, and generally cool nights. The north end of the west fork of the Mendocino area, near Philo has a unique microclimate. This area is cooler than the rest of the viticultural area and is classified as Region I on the University of California heat summation scale developed by Amerine and Winkler. All references to heat summation and distribution of heat, mentioned throughout this document, were gathered from climate studies made by the University of California Agricultural Extension Service offices located at Lake, Mendocino and Sonoma Counties. The Boonville area, which is located southeast of Philo, is warmer and is therefore classified as Region II. The overall climate of the Anderson Valley area is described as "Coastal" by the Mendocino County Farm Advisor's Office, in their booklet, "The Climate of Mendocino County." The total average heat summation for Mendocino AVA for the period of April through October is 3,097 cumulative degree-days and is therefore classified as Region III.

The Mendocino area has a rainy season of moderate temperatures and a dry season with high temperatures. The rainy season occurs in the winter months from October through April and the rainfall in this area is greater than the state's Central Valley area. The five months from May through September constitute the summer or dry season. The average annual temperature for the area is about 59 °F (15 °C) and the annual precipitation varies from about 44 in (1,118 mm) in the northern area of the western fork of the proposed area to about 37 in (940 mm) in the south.

Climatically, Mendocino falls somewhere in the middle between Sonoma County and Lake County. The average Mendocino growing season is 268 days and rainfall averages 39.42 in (1,001.27 mm) per year. The distribution of heat for June, July, and August averages 602 degree-days and falls between Lake County (678) and Sonoma County (541). In comparison, Sonoma County, a major grape-growing region to the south of "Mendocino" displays a profound marine influence. This is apparent in the distribution of heat summation (cumulative degree-days) for the area. Winter is mild, resulting in an average growing season of 308 days with the marine influence providing a slightly warmer spring which promotes a bud break up to 10 days earlier than in the Mendocino area or in Lake County. The marine air influence in Sonoma County extends throughout the summer, holding cumulative degree-days for June, July and August to a lower average than either Mendocino or Lake County. The total average heat summation for Sonoma County for the period of April through October is 3,046 cumulative degree-days, placing it just at the lower range of Region III for grape growing as defined by the University of California. Average rainfall across Sonoma County is the lowest of the three areas being compared, with a range of from 40.50 to 24.10 in (1,028.70–612.14 mm) and an average of from 32.32 in (820.93 mm).
Lake County, east of Mendocino, represents a more harsh continental influence with some moderation occurring due to the location of Clear Lake. The average growing season in Lake County (223 days) is shorter than in Mendocino or Sonoma County. Also, cumulative degree-days for June, July and August are much higher in Lake County than in the other two areas. Average cumulative degree-days for Lake County for the months of June, July and August are 491, 771, and 771 degree-days, respectively. The average heat summation of cumulative. degree-days for Lake County for the months of April through October is 3,380 and is therefore classified at the higher range of Region II. In addition, the beginning of the Lake County growing season is cooler than Sonoma County, with a more rapid drop (comparatively) to winter temperatures. Also, annual rainfall is more variable throughout Lake County, ranging from 30.65 to 62.16 in (778.51–1,578.86 mm) with an average of 45.21 in (1,148.33 mm). The USDA plant hardiness zones range from 8b to 10a.
