= Kelsey Creek Schoolhouse =

Historic schoolhouse in Lake County, California

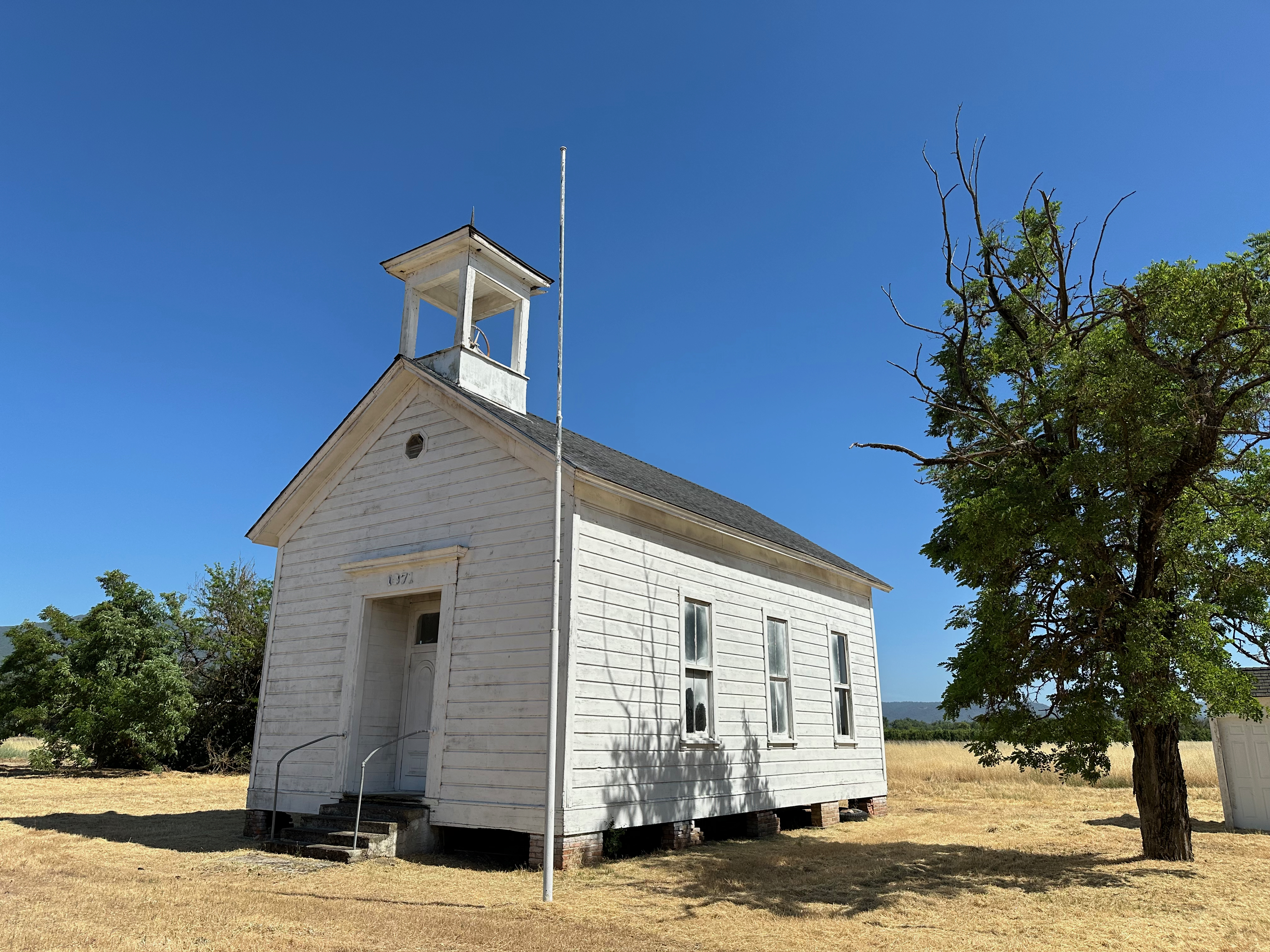
Kelsey Creek Schoolhouse in Finley, California

The Kelsey Creek Schoolhouse, also known as Hells Bend Schoolhouse, is a former one-room school and a historical building in Lake County, California.

The building is a white gabled structure, approximately 22 feet wide and 36 feet long, topped with a small belfry that once housed the school bell. Originally built in 1871 on the Quercus Ranch, two miles north of Kelseyville proper, it was moved in 1882 on land donated by the Rickabaugh family, about a mile north, to its current location in the 3500 block of East Finley Road in Finley, approximately 1,100 feet (340 m) west of Kelsey Creek. It reportedly welcomed at some point more than 40 students. The building's façade currently features the 1871 date above the door, but 1980s pictures show 1882 instead.

The school, originally part of the Kelsey Creek School District, was consolidated into the Kelseyville School District in 1920. Once no longer hosting classes, it became a "social center" in 1947, run by the Kelsey Creek Community Club. In 1958, The Kelseyville Lions Club supported moving the building to the county fair grounds in Lakeport, a plan that never materialized. The building revived interest as a historical conservation project in the 1970s, and in 1983, a committee started restoration efforts in order to turn the building into a meeting hall.

The schoolhouse, which was still the property of the Kelseyville Unified School District, had historical significance, but also represented a liability given its fire risk and the suspected presence of asbestos and lead paint. The district board explored its options, which included transferring the building to the Lake County Historical Society and move it to the Ely Stage Stop open-air museum, which the society operates.

In 2021, the district granted the schoolhouse to the Lucerne Area Revitalization Association (LARA) as the result of a request for proposal. The non-profit entered a 50-year lease for the property where the schoolhouse sits, and in 2023 was granted $5,000 from Americana Corner's Preserving America Grant Program. LARA completed lead paint remediation in the building in May 2023.
