= Ely Stage Stop =

Open-air museum in Lake County, California

Ely Stage Stop & Country Museum
- Established: 2011; 15 years ago
- Location: 9921 Soda Bay Rd. Kelseyville, California, United States
- Coordinates: 38.9405°N 122.7393°W
- Type: History museum
- Website: elystagestop.com

The Ely Stage Stop & Country Museum, or simply Ely Stage Stop, is an open-air museum in Kelseyville, California. It was founded in 2011 by the Lake County Historical Society and the County of Lake government.

== Site history ==
The first European American settlers in the original location of the building were the Jamison family, which arrived June 1859, when the property was first known as the Lost Springs Ranch. It later became the S-Bar-S Ranch (a quarry by that name still operates in the area).

The Ely Stage Stop house, built around 1856 and which was originally at what is now 7909 Highway 29, a mile north and across the highway from the current site, became in the 1880s a stagecoach stop. It operated along a trail between Kelseyville and Lower Lake which California State Highway 29 still roughly follows. The building saw different uses over the years, and served as a hotel, a post office from 1887 through 1890 (Benjamin Ely, Sr., the owner at the time, was the postmaster), a school for "wayward boys", a general store, and hosted a gas station at some point in the 20th century. The building still operated in the 1980s as a bed and breakfast and antique store. When acquired by Andy Beckstoffer as part of his vineyard planting plans in the Red Hills, it was originally slated for demolition.

Beckstoffer donated the building and the 5-acre parcel the current Ely Stage Stop museum current sits on, and the project was made further possible with an additional donation from the Kettenhofen Family Foundation (Ernest and Polly Kettenhofen owned the S-Bar-S Ranch which the Ely Stage Stop building originally was part of).

The structure was relocated on July 29, 2007 to its current location, along Soda Bay Road/California State Highway 281. It was restored, connected to modern utilities, and serves as the eponymous centerpiece of the museum.

== Exhibits ==
A restored 2/3 model of a Wells Fargo stagecoach that once ran between Hopland and Lakeport was one of the site's early acquisitions. The site has a collection of wagons, antique farm tractors and equipment, including a rare Fitch Four Drive Model D 20-35 brought to the county in 1909. The site also hosts a restored San Francisco cable car.

A large red barn was added to the site in 2012. In May 2024, the site unveiled the Richard Paddock Blacksmith Shop, a replica of a 1880s blacksmith building.

A demonstration garden designed by UC Master Gardeners displays native plants.

== Events ==
The Ely Stage Stop hosts a monthly "Fiddlers’ Jam" with local or guest musicians. The Lake County Historical Society organizes an annual fundraising picnic at the site, which it manages. It also occasionally welcomes school trips, as well as farm-to-table dinners or barbecues.
