= Rancho Sanel =

Mexican land grant in California

Coordinates: 38.980°N 123.110°W

Rancho Sanel was a 17,754-acre (71.85 km^{2}) Mexican land grant in present-day Mendocino County, California, given in 1844 by Governor Manuel Micheltorena to Fernando Feliz (or Felix). The grant extended along the Russian River and encompassed present-day Hopland. It is named after a village of the Pomo people near Hopland; the name means sweat-house in the Pomo language. Neither Spanish nor Mexican influence extended into Mendocino County beyond establishing two ranchos in southern Mendocino County: Rancho Sanel in the Sanel Valley in 1844 and Rancho Yokaya in the Ukiah Valley in 1845.

== History ==
Fernando De La Trinidad Feliz (May 30, 1795 in Los Angeles, California – November 12, 1859 in Hopland, California), who was a regidor (town councilman) at the Pueblo of San José in 1831, was the grantee of Rancho Novato in 1839. When Feliz received the Rancho Sanel grant, he sold Rancho Novato, and brought his cattle to Rancho Sanel and erected an adobe house just south of the present town of Hopland. His family was located there before 1853, and in 1854 Luis Peña and others joined him.

With the cession of California to the United States following the Mexican-American War, the 1848 Treaty of Guadalupe Hidalgo provided that the land grants would be honored. As required by the Land Act of 1851, a claim for Rancho Sanel was filed with the Public Land Commission in 1852, and the grant was patented to Fernando Feliz in 1860.

Feliz' legal adviser, John Knight, received the northernmost one square league of the grant for his services. This latter tract took the name of Knight's Valley. Elijah Dooley (b. 1833) was among the first to purchase land from the Sanel grant, and bought 230 acres (0.9 km^{2}) in 1858. Henry Harper Willard (1828–1888) born in New York, came to California in 1847 with Jonathan D. Stevenson's 1st Regiment of New York Volunteers. Willard and his wife, Mary Maxima, and Joseph Knox and his wife, Maria, settled in the Sanel Valley in 1856. Maxima and Maria were daughters of the Indian chief Camilo Ynitia. In 1859, Willard, Knox and Conner found Hopland. By 1884, Willard owned 1,800 acres (7.3 km^{2}). Willard died in 1888, and Mary Maxima married Armstrong McCabe in 1891. Elijah Hall Duncan (b. 1824) purchased acreage from the rancho in 1858, and in 1879 purchased another 460 acres (1.9 km^{2}). Feliz died in 1859. Feliz sold land at low prices and advantageous terms to settlers, and his descendants had nothing left of the rancho but a town lot in East Hopland.
