= Rancho Novato =

Mexican land grant in California

Coordinates: 38.110°N 122.570°W

Rancho Novato was a 8,871-acre (35.90 km^{2}) Mexican land grant in present day Marin County, California given in 1839 by Governor Juan Alvarado to Fernando Feliz (or Felix). The grant extended along San Pablo Bay, from Black Point to Rancho San Jose, and included the land that now encompasses the city of Novato.

== History ==
Fernando De La Trinidad Feliz (May 30, 1795, Los Angeles, California – November 12, 1859, Hopland, California), who was a regidor (town councilman) at the Pueblo of San José in 1831, received the two square league grant in 1839.

In 1844, Feliz was grantee of Rancho Sanel in Mendocino County, California, and sold Rancho Novato to Jacob P. Leese, and moved to Rancho Sanel. In 1846, Leese sold Rancho Novato to Bezer Simmons, who erected a large wooden house on it in 1850. In 1846, Capt. Bezer Simmons also bought Rancho San Diego Island (now Coronado) from Pedro C. Carillo. Simmons assigned the rancho to his creditors: Bezer J. Simmons, Benjamin F[ranklin]. Simmons (Bezer Simmons’ brother), W. W. Parker, S. Needham, John H. Allen, Andrew McCabe, James Johnson, and Halleck, Peachy & Billings.

With the cession of California to the United States following the Mexican-American War, the 1848 Treaty of Guadalupe Hidalgo provided that the land grants would be honored. As required by the Land Act of 1851, a claim for Rancho Novato was filed with the Public Land Commission in 1852, and the grant was patented to his creditors in 1866.

James Johnson and Andrew McCabe bought out the other creditors, and in 1857 sold Rancho Novato to Francis DeLong and Joseph Sweetser. Francis C. DeLong (June 10, 1808, Cornwall, Vermont – February 11, 1885, Novato) came to California in 1850, and opened a grocery store in San Francisco. He and Joseph Sweetser, a former merchant, became business partners. Sweetser and De Long planted a large orchard of apple, pear, and apricot trees along the banks of Novato Creek. In 1879 Sweetser and DeLong dissolved their partnership, with Sweetser selling all of his holdings to DeLong except for one square mile that is today's downtown Novato.

== See also ==
- Ranchos of California
- List of Ranchos of California
