= Waldorf School of Mendocino County =

Private school for grades Pre-K to 8 in Calpella, California (USA)

The Waldorf School of Mendocino County

Location
- 6280 Third Street; Calpella, Mendocino, California 95418; United States
- Coordinates: 39.2354°N 123.2034°W

Information
- Other name: W.S.M.C.
- Former names: Mountain Meadow Country School (1972-80); Mountain Meadow Waldorf School (1980-92)
- Funding type: Private
- Motto: In our children lies the hope of humanity
- Established: 1972 (54 years ago)
- Founder: Linda Valenziano
- Status: Open
- Locale: Ukiah Valley
- Oversight: MCOE
- NCES School ID: 00088813
- Administrator: Maya Stuart
- Head teacher: Kelly Austin
- Business mgr.: Sarah Carter
- Staff: 5
- Faculty: 7
- Teaching staff: 14
- Grades: Pre-kindergarten – 8^{th}
- Gender: Coeducational
- Age range: 2 3/4–14
- Enrollment: 83 (2023-24)
  - Pre-kindergarten: 16
  - Kindergarten: 9
  - Grade 1: 10
  - Grade 2: 16
  - Grade 3: 3
  - Grade 4: 10
  - Grade 5: 3
  - Grade 6: 5
  - Grade 7: 8
  - Grade 8: 3
- Classes: 9
- Average class size: 8
- Student to teacher ratio: 8
- Education system: Waldorf
- Language: English
- Schedule type: Academic year: Aug.–Jun.; Summer vacation: 12 1/2 wks.
- Hours in school day: 7
- Campus size: 2 2/3 acres (1.1 hectares)
- Campus type: Suburban
- Accreditation: Association of Waldorf Schools of North America
- Publication: Mountain Meadow Monthly
- Annual tuition: PK/K: $9,610 (Note: For 2024–2025 academic year.); 1^{st}/3^{rd}: $11,460; 4^{th}–8^{th}: $11,910
- Feeder to: Ukiah High School
- Affiliation: Waldorf Early Childhood Assn. of North America
- Days of instruction/year: 157
- Website: mendocinowaldorf.org
- Last updated: February 27, 2025

The Waldorf School of Mendocino County is a private school for children in pre-kindergarten through eighth grade in Calpella, California, approximately 6 miles (9.7 km) north of Ukiah.

== History ==
Founded by Linda Valenziano as Mountain Meadow Country School in 1972, the school was originally located in Potter Valley and operated only as a preschool/kindergarten. The following year a first grade class consisting of eight children was added, conducted under Waldorf education principles. Additional grades continued to be organized in subsequent years, eventually prompting the move in 1979 to the west side of Third Street in Calpella. Ms. Valenziano remained on the school's faculty until 1995 and was chiefly responsible for it becoming fully accredited by the Association of Waldorf Schools of North America in 1990, the only school in Mendocino County to do so. It currently serves over 80 students, the majority staying only for pre-K and kindergarten. Since 2014, students enrolled in first grade and beyond are taught using a mixed-age format where students from two grade levels combine to form one class (see § Switch to mixed-age classes below). Teachers remain with a single class all the way through the eighth grade before finally "looping back" to begin again with a new class of first and second graders.

=== Campus ===
The original move to the Calpella campus was only a lease for a single parcel with two buildings, the main one housing the administration and classrooms for the 1^{st} through 8^{th} grades and the smaller used for the preschool and kindergarten. As enrollment continued to grow the school was able to purchase the location in 1985 and began making improvements to the site, including a playing field and a large garden which remain centerpieces of the campus today. In 1996 they saw enrollment swell to its highest levels ever with over 170 students and bought the property opposite the main building on the east side of Third Street for use as a parking lot and the site of an Early Childhood Education complex they were preparing to construct. In 2000, the school retired its mortgage on the original site purchase from 1985 and four years later was able to purchase the sole remaining lot on the west side of Third Street, expanding the campus to 2 2/3 acres (1.1 hectares).

=== Schism ===
Before the start of the 1999–2000 school year the school's community suffered a split when a group of teachers and several families whose children had been enrolled there left to form River Oak Charter School in the Ukiah Unified School District.

=== Switch to mixed-age classes ===
Enrollment suffered sharp declines following the "Great Recession of 2008," falling below 100 students that year for the first time since the mid-1990s. A closure was narrowly averted in 2009, then from 2011 to 2013 the school was forced to sell all of the land it had purchased but not yet made developments on to compensate for budget deficits. When the gradual recovery failed to see enrollment return to its previous numbers, the decision was made in 2014 to switch from traditional single-grade classes to the current mixed-age format with grades 1–8 being combined into just four classes that each had students from two grade levels. At the same time tuition was increased by 40% from $7,500 annually to the current rates which, as of 2025, average $11,750 per year if a child attends from preschool to eighth grade.

== Energy independence ==
Thanks to a $10,000 donation from a student's grandparents in 2017, the school has implemented an energy independence policy and on January 25, 2019, held a ribbon-cutting for a new 15 kW solar energy farm on the campus which now provides over 90% of the electricity used by the school.

== Transportation ==
The selection of the Third Street property has provided several notable advantages related to transportation, chief among them its proximity to US Highway 101, which lies only 1,330 feet (410 m) to the west and features a Calpella exit (#555A) that empties onto Moore Street along the campus' south boundary. In time, the easy highway access, safe location and very light traffic led the Mendocino Transit Authority to install a large, covered seating area in front of the school along with five daily stops by their Route #20 bus that travels between the county's two largest inland population centers: Willits and Ukiah. Occurring at 8:43am, 1:36pm and 4:16pm northbound plus 8:00am and 3:35pm southbound, the stops are conveniently timed to provide older students with a public transit option for travel to and from either community to the school.
