= Masut, California =

Former Pomo settlement in California, U.S.

Masut (also, Ma-su-ta-kea and Masu-ta-kaya) was a former Pomo settlement in Mendocino County, California, United States. It was located 3 miles (4.8 km) northwest of Calpella. The same name was also given to a band of the Pomo people associated with the settlement.

The Masut Pomo are known to have traveled widely, sometimes traveling as far as 50 miles to Clear Lake to quarry obsidian and magnesite with the permission of other Pomo who owned the quarries there.
