= CA-29 =

CA-29 may refer to:

- California's 29th congressional district
- California State Route 29
- USS Chicago (CA-29), a World War II heavy cruiser
