= Calpella =

Calpella may refer to:

- Calpella, California
- Calpella mobile platform, a platform based on Intel Nehalem microarchitecture.
- A brachiopod genus, see Calpella (brachiopod).
