= Chomchadila, California =

Former Pomo settlement in California, US

Chomchadila (also written as Choam-cha-di-la-poma or Tcómtcadila) is a former Pomo settlement in Mendocino County, California, United States. While its precise location is unknown, it was said to be on a mesa south of Calpella, about two miles north of the confluence of the East Fork and Russian River. The namesake of the latter comes from Kalpela, a chief of the settlement.
