= Big Valley Band of Pomo Indians =

Indian tribe in California, United States

Location of Big Valley Rancheria

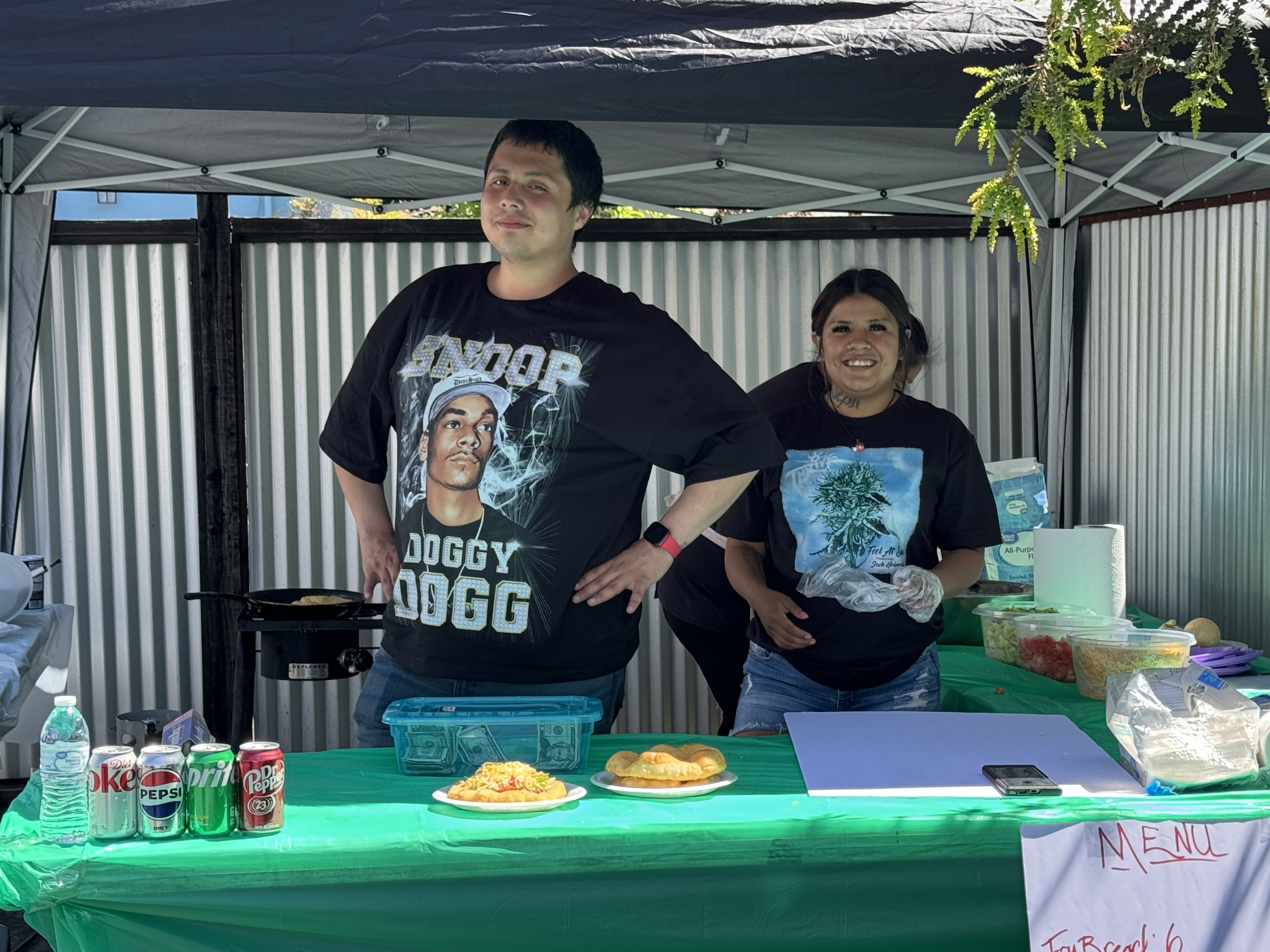
Members of the Big Valley Rancheria at a food event in 2024.

The Big Valley Band of Pomo Indians of the Big Valley Rancheria is a federally recognized tribe of Pomo Indians, with a reservation located in Lake County, California, near the town of Finley. They conduct tribal business from Lakeport, California.

The tribe formed its current governmental system under the Indian Reorganization Act of 1935 and ratified its constitution on 15 January 1936. Tribal membership is open to any descendant of the tribal members listed on the official 1935 census rolls, regardless of blood quantum. Today tribal enrollment is estimated to be 1230.

The traditional language of the tribe is Eastern Pomo, also known as Bahtssal or Clear Lake Pomo. The tribe has been able to hold Eastern Pomo language classes, bring together elders with younger tribal members for lessons, and document elders speaking both in audio and video recordings.

Economic development for the tribe has been possible through the creation of the Konocti Vista Casino, which is located near Lakeport, on the shores of Clear Lake. The Big Valley Band also owns a hotel, marina, RV park, the Ku-Hu-Gui Cafe, and the Point Bar as part of the casino resort.

The tribe has an annual Tule Boat Festival with boat building, environmental programs and races among the participating tribes.

39.020364°N 122.887141°W

== Government ==
Big Valley Band of Pomo Indians is a self-governing Native American tribe, with four active members on tribal council. Council positions include; Chairman, Vice-Chairman, Treasurer, and Secretary. The tribe is federally recognized, with an estimated 1230 members. Tribal government has the power to write and enforce its own ordinances; such as, regulation of commerce, tax, and set up judiciary and police enforcement systems and other powers delegated to local government. The tribe often models its own government after that of the local county government. Being that the tribe is in close proximity to the ocean, they work closely with the EPA to ensure that their lands are maintained.

http://www.courts.ca.gov/14938.htm

== Language and traditions ==
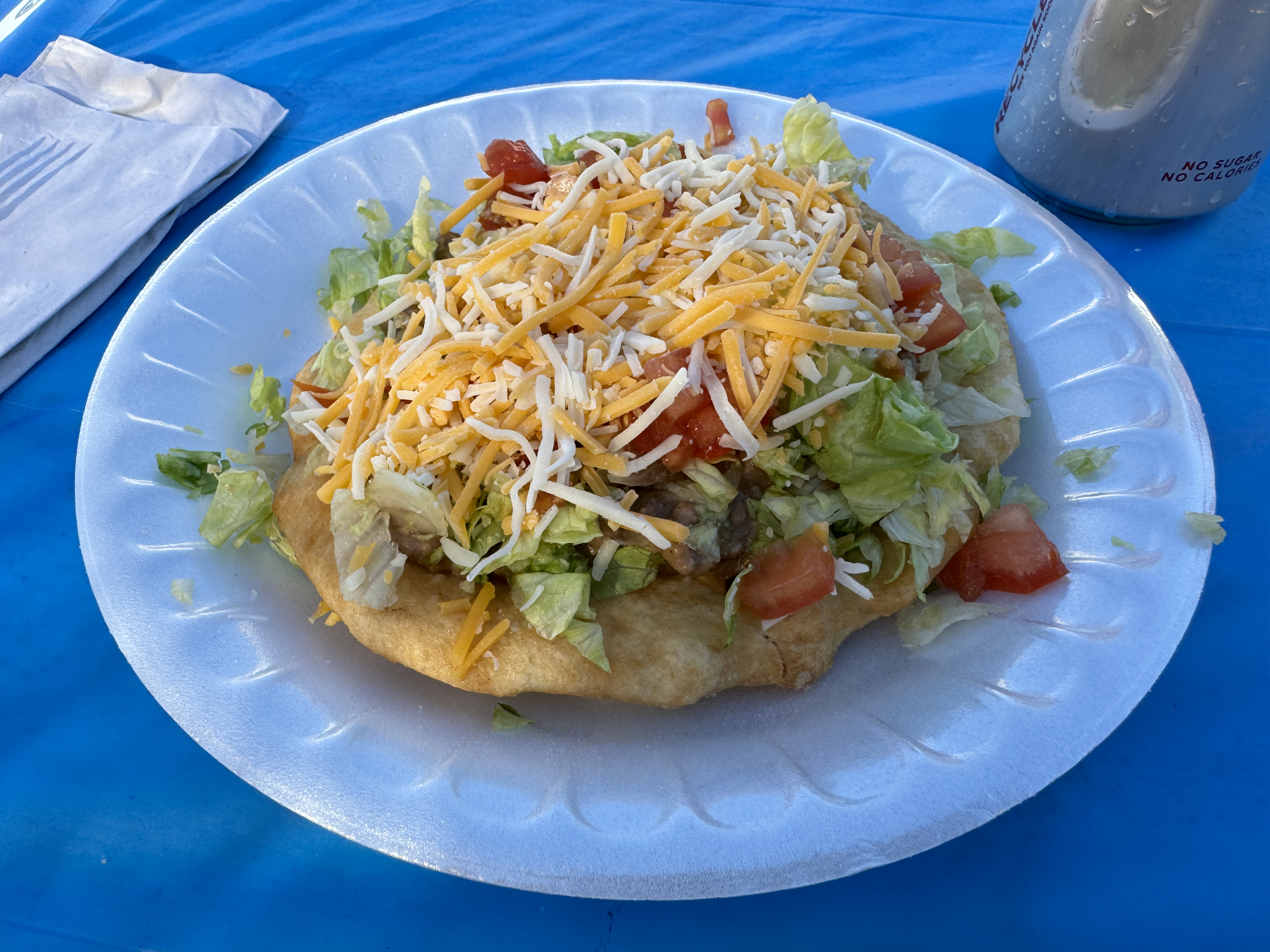
An Indian taco made by a chef at Big Valley Rancheria in 2023.

The tribe speaks Eastern Pomo Language also known as Bahtssal, which was bordered by Patwin and Yuki languages. Very few fluent speakers remain. The tribe is providing continuous efforts to revitalize and maintain their language. Further history of language can be found here. The tribe also participates in an annual Tule Boat Festival, which began in 2001 and is now on its 15th year. The festival exhibits the tradition of gathering supplies, building the boat, and ultimately uniting a community to come together and teach those around them. The festival includes multiple racing teams and divisions, providing an opportunity for all community members to race.

== Economic development ==
Big Valley Rancheria Band of Pomo Indians is a self-sustaining tribe. They offer many opportunities to support their tribal community; such as job opportunities, volunteer hours, tribal youth programs, housing, transportation and more. The tribe also owns a casino, hotel, RV park, camp ground, and smoke shop.

== Education ==
The ranchería is served by the Lakeport Unified School District.
