= Fitch Four Drive =

American agricultural equipment manufacturer

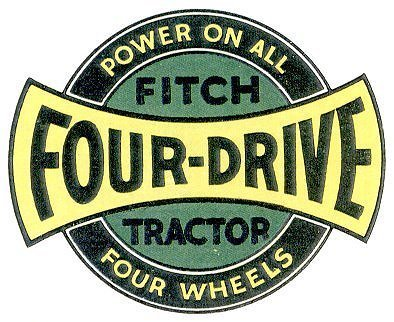
FitchFourDriveLogo

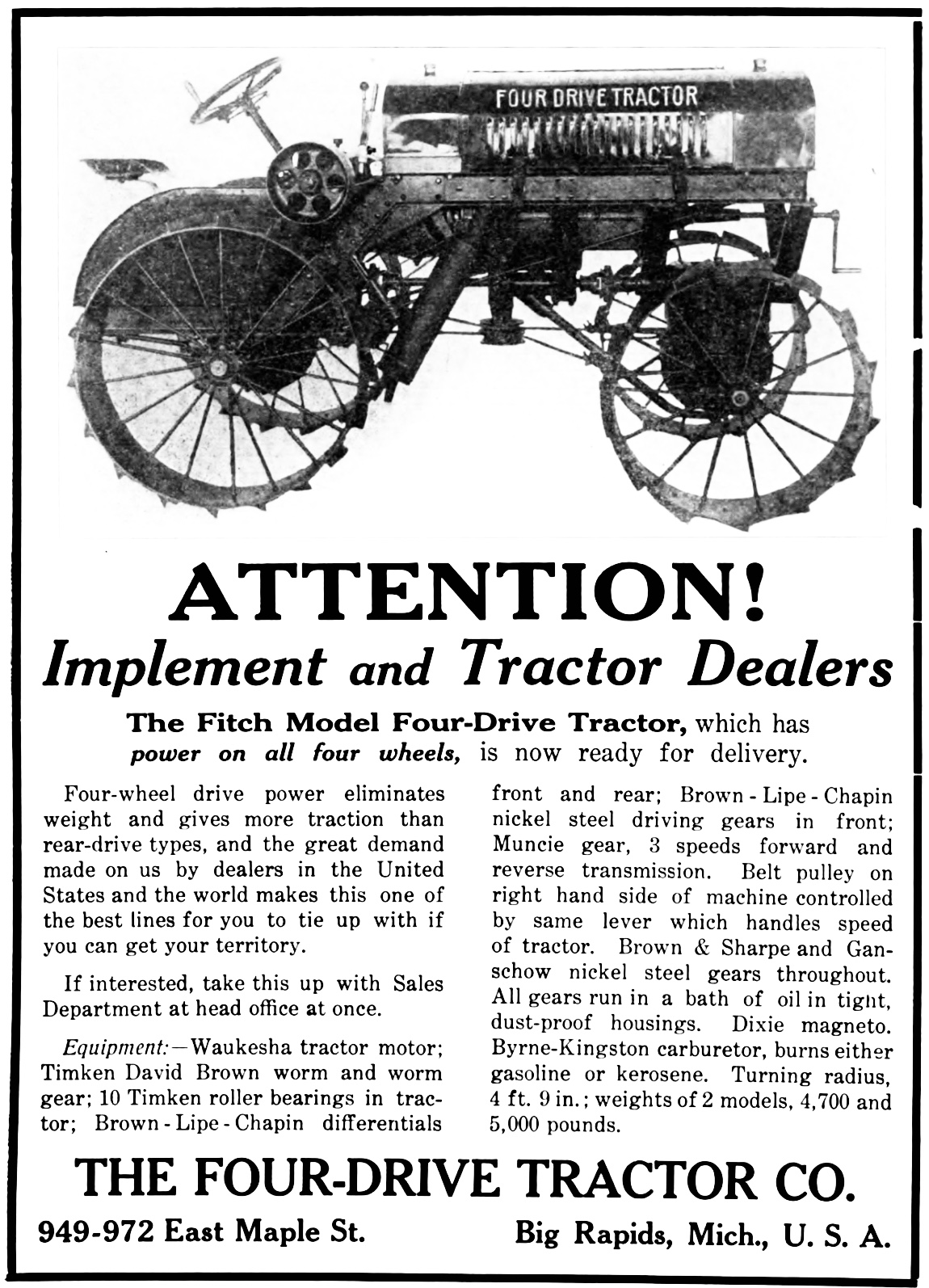
Four Drive advertisement (1917)

The Four Drive Tractor Company - also known as Fitch Four Drive Tractor Company - was an agricultural equipment manufacturer which was based in Big Rapids, Michigan. The company was formed in 1915 in Ludington, Michigan and produced tractors until 1930.

== History ==
The Fitch tractor was invented by John H. Fitch of Mason County, Michigan in 1914. Mr. Fitch had been a millwright in the lumber industry in West Michigan and then turned his attention to the manufacture of mechanical inventions and to fruit farming. He saw the new horseless vehicles getting stuck along the roads bordering his farm and began to think about a machine that would use all four wheels as drivers instead of just two while the others were helpless. Although there had been a few four-wheel drive tractors invented prior to his, "The Fitch" as he named the tractor, was the first to use gears instead of chains to transfer the power from the engine to the axles and wheels.

The Four Drive Tractor Company was formed in November 1915 in Ludington, Michigan. John H. Fitch was the President of the company. In December 1915, the Big Rapids, Michigan board of trade made an offer to move the company to that city. The board financed construction of a 45'x200' brick building on Maple Street east of the Grand Rapids & Indiana railroad tracks. Mr. Fitch moved to Big Rapids to tend to the company and perfect the tractor. World War I caused a delay of materials needed and progress was being made on marketing, demonstrating and selling the tractors. Mr. Fitch died suddenly in November 1916. Elbert Jenkins of Big Rapids - who was the Vice President of the Company during the first year - was elected as the new President after Mr. Fitch's passing.

The company struggled during its entire existence to make a profit as the tractors were selling for just a few hundred dollars above the cost of manufacture. This led to the demise of the company after the Stock Market Crash of 1929.

== Models ==
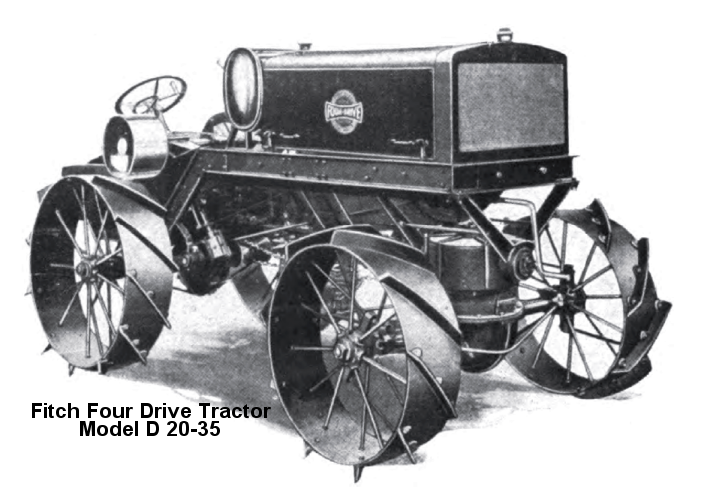
Fitch20-35ModelD

The company produced various models of Four Drive tractors during its first few years with a draw bar and belt ratings of 15-26 to 15-30 featuring Beaver and Waukesha 4-cylinder motors and weighing 4,400 to 6,000 pounds. The best selling Fitch tractor was the Model D 20-35 which featured a Climax 4-cylinder motor and can be identified by an oval-shaped fuel tank behind the hood.

In 1929, the company produced a shorter, sturdier tractor for heavy work that they referred to "The Cat" Model E 15-30 Model. Later, the name "The Cat" was removed and became the Model F.

Estimates of the production numbers of the Fitch Models were around 2,000 tractors while the Model E/F was less than 70.

== Existing tractors ==
There are 4 known fully restored and operational Model D 20-35 Fitch tractors: Aberdeen, Washington; The Coach House Museum in Feilding, New Zealand; Marlborough Vintage Farm Machinery Museum in Blenheim, New Zealand, and Gunnedah Rural Museum, Gunnedah, Australia.

There are 5 known unrestored Model 20-35 tractors: Angels Camp Museum, Angels Camp, California; The Packard and Pioneer Museum in Maungatapere, Whangarei, Northland, New Zealand; and private owners around the Modesto, California area and in Central Minnesota. The Lake County California Historical Society, has a Model D 20-35 on display at the Ely Stage Stop & Country Museum near Kelseyville, CA. There is also a partial Fitch tractor in Las Vegas, NV that the owner is looking to restore.

There are 5 known Model E/F 15-30 tractors: 2 under private ownership in Michigan that are fully restored and operational, one at Museo de Tractores in Villa Carlos Paz, Argentina, one at North West Agricultural Museum in Lichtenburg, South Africa and a Model F in Ontario, Canada.
