= California State Route 221 =

Highway in California

State Route 221
- Napa-Vallejo Highway
- SR 221 highlighted in red

Route information
- Maintained by Caltrans
- Length: 2.682 mi (4.316 km)

Major junctions
- South end: SR 12 / SR 29 near Napa
- North end: SR 121 in Napa

Location
- Country: United States
- State: California
- Counties: Napa

Highway system
- State highways in California; Interstate; US; State; Scenic; History; Pre‑1964; Unconstructed; Deleted; Freeways
← SR 220	→ SR 222

State Route 221 (SR 221) is a state highway in the U.S. state of California that runs in and just outside the City of Napa, providing access to Napa Valley College and Napa State Hospital. The highway's southern terminus is with State Route 12 and State Route 29 outside the southeast corner of the city, and its northern terminus is at State Route 121 inside the city. SR 221 forms part of the Napa-Vallejo Highway with SR 29.

== Route description ==
Route 221 is defined in section 521 of the California Streets and Highways Code, and that the highway is "from Route 29 near Soscol Road to Route 121 at Imola Avenue in Napa".

Route 221 is the northernmost part of the Napa-Vallejo Highway. It is a divided four-lane expressway that serves as an alternate to the nearby Route 29 freeway into Napa from the south. Unlike Route 29, however, 221 provides direct access to Napa Valley College and Napa State Hospital. The southern terminus is with Route 29 (which also carries Route 12), where it continues as the Napa-Vallejo Highway. The northern terminus is an intersection with Route 121, where 121 continues north as Soscol Avenue.

SR 221 is part of the National Highway System, a network of highways that are considered essential to the country's economy, defense, and mobility by the Federal Highway Administration.

== History ==
At SR 221's southern terminus with SR 12 / SR 29 and Soscol Ferry Road, the signalized intersection was reconstructed into a double roundabout interchange to relieve congestion. However, the direct connection from westbound SR 12 / northbound SR 29 to Soscol Ferry Road has been eliminated, though an alternate connection to Soscol Ferry is via Napa Valley Corporate Way. It opened in the fall of 2024, with full construction completed in 2025.

== Major intersections ==
Except where prefixed with a letter, postmiles were measured on the road as it was in 1964, based on the alignment that existed at the time, and do not necessarily reflect current mileage. Postmile prefixes include: R reflecting a realignment in the route since then, M indicating a second realignment, L referring to an overlap due to a correction or change, and T indicating postmiles classified as temporary. Segments that remain unconstructed or have been relinquished to local control may be omitted. The entire route is in Napa County.

Location	Postmile	Destinations	Notes
	0.00	Soscol Ferry Road	Continuation beyond SR 12 / SR 29; not accessible from westbound SR 12 / northbound SR 29
	0.00	SR 12 / SR 29 (Napa-Vallejo Highway) – Sonoma, Calistoga, Vallejo, Fairfield	Double roundabout interchange; south end of SR 221; connects to I-80 west towards San Francisco
Napa	2.68	SR 121 (Imola Avenue, Soscol Avenue) – Lake Berryessa, Sonoma, Downtown Napa	North end of SR 221
1.000 mi = 1.609 km; 1.000 km = 0.621 mi: Incomplete access
