= Sanel Valley =

Valley containing the town of Hopland, CA

Coordinates: 38°59′59″N 123°06′34″W

The Sanel Valley in Mendocino County, California, is a valley along the Russian River containing the town of Hopland. The river flows through the valley for approximately 6 miles (9.7 km) from the northeast (where it connects from its headwaters and the Ukiah Valley through a rocky constriction) to the southwest, and it is met near Hopland by two tributaries, Feliz Creek on the west side of the river and McDowell Creek on the east. The valley is approximately 2 miles (3.2 km) wide, and covers an area of 8.4 square miles (22 km^{2}).

The valley is served by U.S. Route 101, which passes through the valley near the west bank of the river, and by California State Route 175, which connects Hopland through the Mayacamas Mountains to Lakeport and Clear Lake to the east.

The name Sanel comes from a Pomo language word for a sweat lodge. A village of the Hopland Pomo was located at what is now Old Hopland and gave its name to the valley and the Rancho Sanel that encompassed it.
