= Rancho San Diego Island =

Mexican land grant in California

Coordinates: 32.710°N 117.200°W

Rancho San Diego Island (also called "Peninsula of San Diego") was a 4,185-acre (16.94 km^{2}) Mexican land grant in present day San Diego County, California, given in 1846 by Governor Pío Pico to Pedro C. Carrillo. The grant consisted of the strip of land lying between San Diego Bay and the Pacific Ocean, which was initially referred to as the Island or Peninsula of San Diego, and which included present day Coronado and North Island.

== History ==
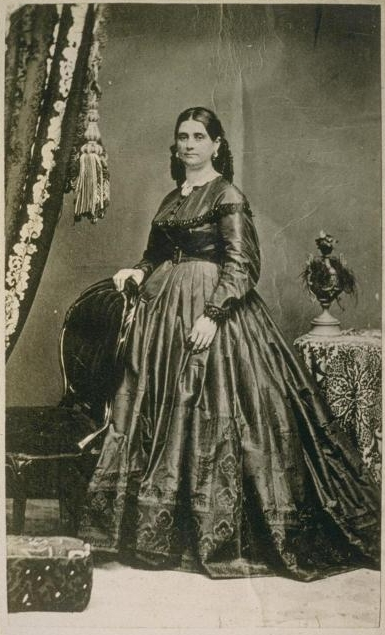
Josepha Bandini de Carrillo

Pedro C. Carrillo, son of Carlos Antonio Carrillo, studied law in Boston, where he had been taken by Captain William G. Dana, the husband of Pedro's sister, María Josefa Petra del Carmen. In 1846, Carrillo married Josefa Bandini, daughter of Juan Bandini. Pedro Carrillo and Josefa were given Rancho Peninsula de San Diego by Pio Pico, as a wedding present. Five months later, Carrillo sold the property to Capt. Bezer Simmons, the American captain of the trading ship "Magnolia".

Capt. Bezer Simmons (1810–1850) of New Bedford, Massachusetts married Laura Billings (1820–1849) in 1845. Laura Billings was an older sister of Frederick H. Billings, and he accompanied Capt. Simmons and his wife, to San Francisco in 1849. Laura Billings contracted a fever on the Isthmus of Panama, and died soon after they reached San Francisco. In 1846, Bezer Simmons also bought Rancho Novato from Jacob P. Leese.

With the cession of California to the United States following the Mexican-American War, the 1848 Treaty of Guadalupe Hidalgo provided that the land grants would be honored. As required by the Land Act of 1851, a claim for Rancho San Diego Island was filed with the Public Land Commission in 1852. Frederick H. Billings, James R. Bolton and Henry Wager Halleck of the law firm Halleck, Peachy & Billings represented Simmons Estate, as Bezer had died Sept 26,1850 in San Francisco. In 1851, Executors of Bezer Simmons sold to William Henry Aspinwall, and the grant was patented to Archibald C. Peachy (a law partner of Simmons Brother-in-Law, Frederick Billings) and William H. Aspinwall in 1869.

In 1885, the entire property including North Island, was purchased by Elisha S. Babcock, Jr., Captain Charles T. Hinde, Hampton L. Story, and Jacob Gruendike. Babcock then invited his brother-in-law, Heber Ingle, and Josephus Collett, a railroad stockholder, to become investors, and formed the Coronado Beach Company on April 7, 1886, and started construction on the Hotel del Coronado.

The first development on North Island took place in 1893 when the US government secured about 18 acres (73,000 m^{2}) through condemnation proceedings. In 1917, the government took possession of the North Island through a bill of condemnation. On October 25, 1935, the entire area was reserved for the Naval Air Station.

== See also ==
- Ranchos of California
- List of Ranchos of California
