= Santiago Canyon Fire =

1889 wildfire in Southern California

Santiago Canyon Fire of 1889
- Date: September 24, 1889 –; September 30, 1889; (7 days)
- Location: Southern California: Orange County; Riverside County; San Diego County
- Coordinates: 33°47′26″N 117°43′30″W

Statistics
- Burned area: >300,000 acres (121,406 ha; 469 sq mi; 1,214 km^{2})

Impacts
- Deaths: Unknown
- Injuries: Unknown
- Structures lost: Unknown
- Cost: Unknown

Ignition
- Cause: Human (accidental)

The Santiago Canyon Fire of 1889 (previously called the Great Fire of 1889) was a massive wildfire in California, which burned large parts of Orange County, Riverside County, and San Diego County during the last week of September 1889. The fire reportedly started in Fremont Canyon, a canyon close to what today is Irvine Lake. Until 2018, it was possibly the single largest wildfire in the recorded history of California, with at least 300,000 acres (1,200 km^{2}) of land burned. In mid-August 2018, the Ranch Fire in the Mendocino Complex Fire surpassed the Santiago Canyon Fire's assumed acreage.

Assistant Regional Forester (USFS) L.A. Barrett, who wrote a 1935 report on California wildfires, said of it: "I was living in Orange County at the time and well remember the great fire reported herein from September 24 to 26. Nothing like it occurred in California since the National Forests have been administered. In fact in my 33 years in the Service I have never seen a forest or brush fire to equal it. This one covered an enormous scope of country and burned very rapidly."

Conditions leading up to the 1889 fire included a much longer and more severe annual drought than usual, with rains largely ceasing in March and less than 0.4 inches (1 cm) of precipitation being recorded for the 5½ months prior (records from the National Archives). This was coupled with multiple katabatic wind events (known as “northers” or Santa Anas) that month, one of which occurred about 10 days prior and likely added to the dryness of fuels. Temperatures during the week prior remained high and were coupled with several severe fires in San Diego County in which “at least 10,000 acres [40 km^{2}] have burned over, a dwelling house consumed and other property destroyed”.

== Overview ==
In addition to the Santiago Canyon Fire, there were several other significant fires fanned by the same gale force Santa Ana winds in San Diego and San Bernardino counties. The Santiago Canyon Fire was the largest and has been estimated as being greater than 308,000 acres (1,250 km^{2}). Another wildfire in San Diego County at the time has been estimated to have been greater than 60,000 acres (240 km^{2}). The Orange County fire burned through areas of chaparral and coastal sage scrub, as well as a number of farm fields in the Santa Ana Valley, where farmers attempted to control the fire by plowing ahead of it. A detailed analysis of the fire can be found in an article by Keeley and Zedler.

== Size ==
USFS Regional Forester L.A. Barrett (1935), in reference to the size stated that "Nothing like it occurred in California since the National Forests have been administered. In fact in my 33 years in the Service I have never seen a forest or brush fire to equal it." Since his career included the 1932 Matilija Fire, which was over 220,000 acres (890 km^{2}), it can be inferred that the wildfire was much larger than 220,000 acres. A thorough study of newspaper accounts suggests it was on the order of 310,000 acres (1,300 km^{2}), but some reports indicate that the Santiago Canyon Fire may have reached a size of 495,000 acres (2,000 km^{2}), especially if it had merged with other large wildfires that were concurrently burning in San Diego County. Other estimates have claimed a smaller size.

== Reports ==
One of the first reports of the fire was delivered by telegraph. Riverside Daily Press and Tribune reported on the fire by telegraph as follows:

By Telegraph. Mountain Fires! Fires Near Santa Ana. Los Angeles, Sept. 25. - A special to the Tribune from Santa Ana says the mountains for about twenty miles [32 km] east of that city were on fire last night. The fire originated in Santiago cañon, in a sheepherder’s camp, and as the wind was blowing a perfect gale from off the desert the mountains were soon red with the angry flames. About 50,000 sacks of barley, threshed and unthreshed, on the San Joaquin ranch, invites the flames from the surrounding hilltops.

Daily San Diegan described the extent and damage wrought by the fire:

The Fires. Reported From Nearly all Sections of the County. Reports from different sections of the county show that last week’s fires were widespread. For two days there were over thirty miles [48 km] of burning brush on the westside of Santa Rosa Range, and thousands of sheep are supposed to have lost their lives in the conflagration. In the Aliso District, near Encinitas, the fire raged several days, resulting in a heavy loss of crops to the farmers in that section… the most extensive fires for years have been raging on the Santa Margarita ranch. A bridge on the line of the California Southern railway, below Temecula, was burned as the result of forest fires. Fires near Julian burned considerable timber and did other damage.

Daily Courier reported on the events of the Santiago Canyon Fire and other nearby wildfires in Southern California:

Fires in Three Counties. During the past three or four days destructive fires have been raging in San Bernardino, Orange and San Diego severely. Mr. Warren Wilson, who arrived from San Diego yesterday, says it is a positive fact that two or three thousand sheep were burned near Santa Ana, while great quantities of grain in the bag, fencing, hay, etc., have been destroyed. So far, no human lives are reported lost. A fatality seems to follow this ill-omened year of 1889. Fire and flood and earthquake shocks have marked this year for their own. It is a year of disasters, widespread destruction of life and property – and, well, a year of horrors.

Many reports about the fire's size and impact were made that were supposedly false.

== See also ==
- California Chaparral Institute
- List of California wildfires by size
- Mendocino Complex Fire, which surpassed the Santiago Canyon Fire as the largest in state history in 2018
- Santiago Fire, a 2007 fire that burned a similar path
- Silverado Fire, a 2020 fire that burned in the same area
- Bond Fire, a 2020 fire that burned a similar path
