= California State Route 29 =

Highway in California

State Route 29
- SR 29 highlighted in red

Route information
- Maintained by Caltrans
- Length: 105.648 mi (170.024 km)
- Existed: 1934–present

Major junctions
- South end: I-80 in Vallejo
- SR 12 in Napa; SR 121 in Napa; SR 128 from Rutherford to Calistoga; SR 175 in Middletown; SR 53 in Lower Lake; SR 281 near Glenview; SR 175 from near Kelseyville to near Lakeport
- North end: SR 20 at Upper Lake

Location
- Country: United States
- State: California
- Counties: Solano, Napa, Lake

Highway system
- State highways in California; Interstate; US; State; Scenic; History; Pre‑1964; Unconstructed; Deleted; Freeways
← SR 28	→ SR 32

State Route 29 (SR 29) is a state highway in the U.S. state of California that travels from Interstate 80 in Vallejo north to State Route 20 in Upper Lake. It serves as the primary road through the Napa Valley, providing access to the Lake County region to the north and the rest of the San Francisco Bay Area to the south.

== Route description ==
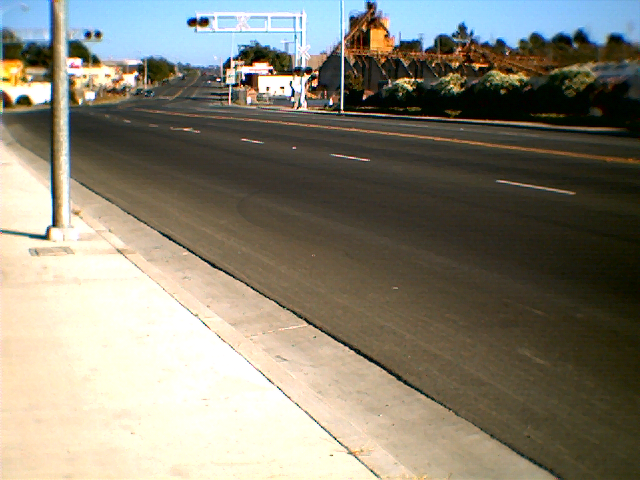
SR 29 in Vallejo

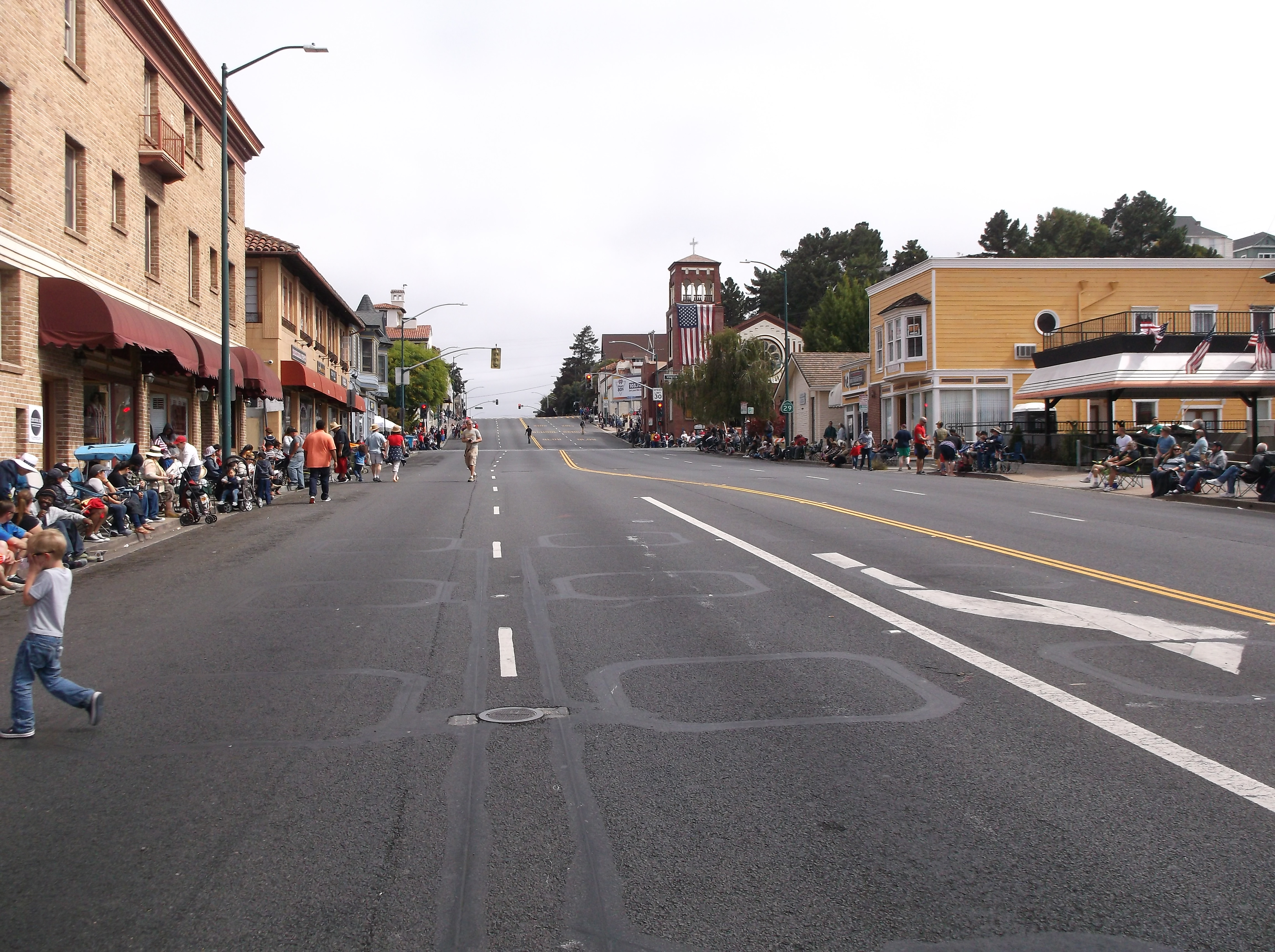
A crowd watches the 4th of July parade on SR 29 in Vallejo in 2016.

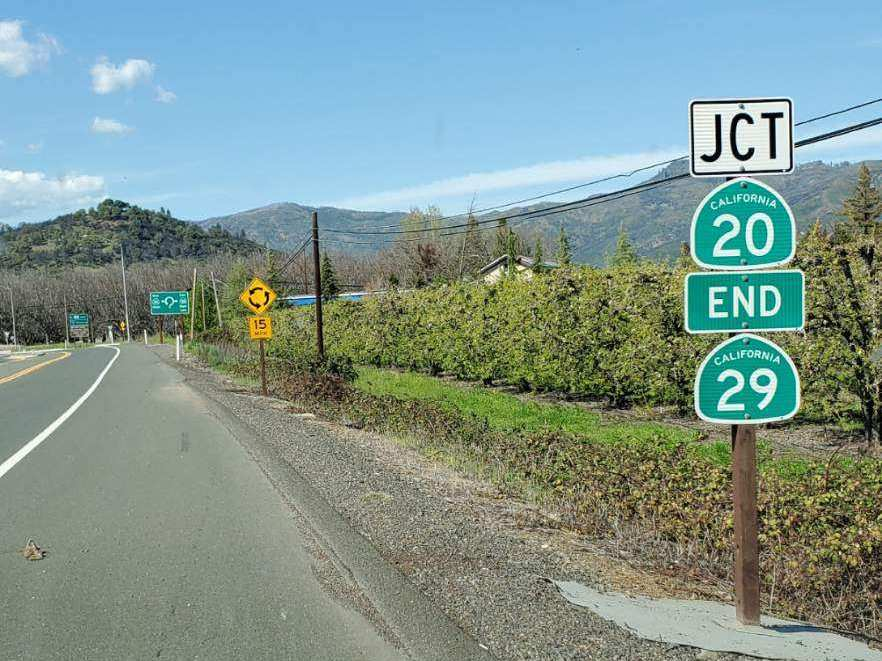
End of SR 29 at SR 20 in Upper Lake

Route 29 is defined in section 329 of the California Streets and Highways Code, and that the highway is "from Route 80 near Vallejo to Route 20 near Upper Lake via the vicinity of Napa, via Calistoga, via Lower Lake, passing south of Kelseyville and via Lakeport".

SR 29 begins at Interstate 80 (I-80) in Vallejo just north of the Carquinez Bridge. After running through downtown Vallejo, it travels as a four-lane expressway (on some segments, five) through American Canyon to Napa. It then briefly becomes a freeway as it passes through Napa.

The expressway continues through the southern Napa Valley before terminating in Yountville. SR 29 continues as a 2-lane road through the Napa Valley cities of Oakville, Rutherford, St. Helena, and Calistoga, while also passing many of the region's notable vineyards and wineries. This portion of the highway is often heavily congested with tourists in spring and summer.

North of Calistoga, SR 29 climbs Mount Saint Helena, at the border between Napa County and Lake County. The road then heads north to Middletown and Lower Lake before going around the southern and western sides of Clear Lake. In Lakeport, SR 29 becomes a freeway as it bypasses the city. It then reverts as a two-lane highway before it terminates at Route 20 in Upper Lake.

Points of interest along Route 29 include Bothe-Napa Valley State Park, Bale Grist Mill State Historic Park, Robert Louis Stevenson State Park, the St. Helena Toll Road and Bull Trail, the Stone House, and the Lower Lake Stone Jail.

SR 29 is part of the California Freeway and Expressway System south of the intersection of Oak Knoll Avenue (approximately 1 mile north of the Napa city limits), and south of Yountville and north of SR 53 is part of the National Highway System, a network of highways that are considered essential to the country's economy, defense, and mobility by the Federal Highway Administration. SR 29 is eligible for inclusion in the State Scenic Highway System, but it is not officially designated as a scenic highway by the California Department of Transportation.

== History ==
Historically, the route between the Napa Valley and Middletown was served by the Old Bull Trail Road, built by volunteers in the 1850s, that had grades of up to 35 percent. In 1868, this was replaced by the St. Helena Toll Road, which had more manageable inclines of up to 12 percent. The State of California purchased the toll road in 1925.

== Major intersections ==
Except where prefixed with a letter, postmiles were measured on the road as it was in 1964, based on the alignment that existed at the time, and do not necessarily reflect current mileage. Postmile prefixes include: R reflecting a realignment in the route since then, M indicating a second realignment, L referring to an overlap due to a correction or change, and T indicating postmiles classified as temporary. Segments that remain unconstructed or have been relinquished to local control may be omitted. The numbers reset at county lines; the start and end postmiles in each county are given in the county column.

County	Location	Postmile	Exit	Destinations	Notes
Solano; SOL 0.00-5.96	Vallejo	0.00		I-80 west / Maritime Academy Drive – California Maritime Academy	Interchange; south end of SR 29; I-80 exit 29A
Solano; SOL 0.00-5.96	Vallejo	1.01		Lemon Street to I-780	
Solano; SOL 0.00-5.96	Vallejo			Curtola Parkway to I-780	
Solano; SOL 0.00-5.96	Vallejo	2.07		Maine Street	Former SR 141
Solano; SOL 0.00-5.96	Vallejo	4.73		SR 37 to I-80 – San Rafael, Sacramento, San Francisco	Interchange; SR 37 exit 19
Napa; NAP 0.00-48.58	American Canyon	R2.77	—	Watson Lane, Green Island Road	Interchange
Napa; NAP 0.00-48.58		4.71		SR 12 east (Jameson Canyon Road) / Airport Boulevard – Fairfield, Sacramento, Napa County Airport	South end of SR 12 overlap
Napa; NAP 0.00-48.58		R6.20	—	SR 221 north (Napa-Vallejo Highway) – Napa, Lake Berryessa	Southern terminus of SR 221; double roundabout interchange; Soscol Ferry Road not accessible northbound
Napa; NAP 0.00-48.58	Napa	R8.66		SR 121 south / SR 12 west (Carneros Highway) – Sonoma	North end of SR 12 overlap; south end of SR 121 overlap
Napa; NAP 0.00-48.58			South end of freeway		
Napa; NAP 0.00-48.58	Napa	10.31	16	SR 121 north (Imola Avenue) – Lake Berryessa	North end of SR 121 overlap
Napa; NAP 0.00-48.58	Napa	11.55	18A	First Street – Downtown Napa	
Napa; NAP 0.00-48.58	Napa	12.04	18B	Lincoln Avenue	
Napa; NAP 0.00-48.58	Napa	13.06	19	Trancas Street, Redwood Road	Former SR 221
Napa; NAP 0.00-48.58	Napa		North end of freeway		
Napa; NAP 0.00-48.58	Napa		—	Sierra Avenue	Interchange; northbound exit and entrance
Napa; NAP 0.00-48.58	Yountville	19.03	—	California Drive – Yountville, Veterans Home	Interchange
Napa; NAP 0.00-48.58	Rutherford	24.60		SR 128 east (Rutherford Road) – Lake Berryessa, Winters	South end of SR 128 overlap
Napa; NAP 0.00-48.58	Calistoga	36.89		SR 128 west (Foothill Boulevard) – Geyserville	North end of SR 128 overlap
Lake; LAK 0.00-52.54	Middletown	5.81		SR 175 (Main Street) – Cobb Mountain Area	Eastern terminus of SR 175
Lake; LAK 0.00-52.54	Lower Lake	20.31		SR 53 north / Morgan Valley Road (Main Street) – Clearlake, Business District	Southern terminus of SR 53
Lake; LAK 0.00-52.54		27.89		SR 281 (Soda Bay Road) / Red Hills Road – Konocti Harbor, Soda Bay	Eastern terminus of SR 281
Lake; LAK 0.00-52.54		31.05		SR 175 east – Middletown, Cobb Mountain Area	South end of SR 175 overlap
Lake; LAK 0.00-52.54		R40.14		SR 175 west / South Main Street (SR 29 Bus. north), Soda Bay Road – Hopland	North end of SR 175 overlap
Lake; LAK 0.00-52.54			South end of freeway		
Lake; LAK 0.00-52.54	Lakeport	R41.42	102	Lakeport Boulevard, Todd Road – Lakeport	
Lake; LAK 0.00-52.54	Lakeport	R42.68	103	11th Street, Scotts Valley Road – Lakeport	
Lake; LAK 0.00-52.54	North Lakeport	R45.15	106	Hill Road, Park Way	
Lake; LAK 0.00-52.54	North Lakeport	R47.85	108	Nice-Lucerne Cutoff (SR 29 Bus. south)	
Lake; LAK 0.00-52.54			North end of freeway		
Lake; LAK 0.00-52.54	Upper Lake	52.54		SR 20 to US 101 / I-5 – Ukiah, Upper Lake, Williams	North end of SR 29
1.000 mi = 1.609 km; 1.000 km = 0.621 mi: Concurrency terminus; Incomplete access
