= California State Route 281 =

Highway in California

State Route 281
- Soda Bay Road
- SR 281 highlighted in red

Route information
- Maintained by Caltrans
- Length: 3.000 mi (4.828 km) Length of unconstructed portion is about 14 mi (22 km)

Major junctions
- West end: Soda Bay Road at Clear Lake
- East end: SR 29 near Glenview

Location
- Country: United States
- State: California
- Counties: Lake

Highway system
- State highways in California; Interstate; US; State; Scenic; History; Pre‑1964; Unconstructed; Deleted; Freeways
← I-280	→ SR 282

State Route 281 (SR 281) is an approximately 3-mile (4.8 km) state highway in the U.S. state of California that runs along Soda Bay Road from near the southern shore of Clear Lake to State Route 29 (SR 29) in Glenview in Lake County. SR 281 is legislatively defined to be a loop route of SR 29 that runs along or near the southern edge of Clear Lake from Glenview to Lakeport, but most of this is unconstructed.

== Route description ==
Route 281 is defined in section 581 of the California Streets and Highways Code, and that the highway is "from Route 29 south of Lakeport to Route 29 southerly of Konocti Bay and via the vicinity of Soda Bay".

The route currently begins at Clear Lake from Soda Bay Road and heads south. After three miles, it meets its south end at State Route 29.

The planned segment west along Soda Bay Road to Lakeport remains unconstructed. This portion of Soda Bay Road is currently Lake County Route 502.

SR 281 is not part of the National Highway System, a network of highways that are considered essential to the country's economy, defense, and mobility by the Federal Highway Administration.

== Major intersections ==
Except where prefixed with a letter, postmiles were measured on the road as it was in 1964, based on the alignment that existed at the time, and do not necessarily reflect current mileage. Postmile prefixes include: R reflecting a realignment in the route since then, M indicating a second realignment, L referring to an overlap due to a correction or change, and T indicating postmiles classified as temporary. Segments that remain unconstructed or have been relinquished to local control may be omitted. The entire route is in Lake County.

Location	Postmile	Destinations	Notes
	14.00	Soda Bay Road (CR 502 west)	Continuation beyond Konocti Bay Road
	14.00	Konocti Bay Road (CR 502 east)	West end of SR 281
	17.00	SR 29 – Lower Lake, Kelseyville	East end of SR 281
	17.00	Red Hill Road	Continuation beyond SR 29
1.000 mi = 1.609 km; 1.000 km = 0.621 mi
