= California State Route 175 =

Highway in California

State Route 175

- Map of western California with SR 175 highlighted in red

Route information
- Maintained by Caltrans
- Length: 37.89 mi (60.98 km)
- Restrictions: No vehicles longer than 39 ft (12 m) in length between Hopland and Lakeport

Major junctions
- West end: US 101 at Hopland
- SR 29 from near Lakeport to near Kelseyville
- East end: SR 29 at Middletown

Location
- Country: United States
- State: California
- Counties: Mendocino, Lake

Highway system
- State highways in California; Interstate; US; State; Scenic; History; Pre‑1964; Unconstructed; Deleted; Freeways
← SR 174	→ SR 176

State Route 175 (SR 175) is a state highway in the U.S. state of California that runs through the Mayacamas Mountains, connecting U.S. Route 101 in Hopland in Mendocino County with State Route 29 in Middletown in Lake County.

== Route description ==
Route 175 is defined in section 475 of the California Streets and Highways Code. The definition omits the concurrency with Route 29 instead of duplicating that segment in the other route's definition in the code:

Route 175 is from:
(a) Route 101 at Hopland to Route 29 near Lakeport.
(b) Route 29 near Kelseyville to Route 29 at Middletown.

SR 175 connects U.S. Route 101 at Hopland to State Route 29 near Lakeport through the Mayacamas Mountains. From there it joins SR 29 until Kelseyville, where it loops out until meeting SR 29 again at its end at Middletown. The section between Hopland and Lakeport is also known locally as the "Hopland Grade", or "Hopland Pass."

Except for the portion on SR 29, SR 175 is not part of the National Highway System, a network of highways that are considered essential to the country's economy, defense, and mobility by the Federal Highway Administration.

== History ==
Originally constructed in the early 1920s, it is one of the steepest and most difficult to drive of any California state highway. Until recently it was called the "crookedest road in California". Vehicles more than 39 feet (12 m) in length are banned from the Hopland Grade, due to its many tight hairpin turns and curves.

== Major intersections ==
Except where prefixed with a letter, postmiles were measured on the road as it was in 1964, based on the alignment that existed at the time, and do not necessarily reflect current mileage. Postmile prefixes include: R reflecting a realignment in the route since then, M indicating a second realignment, L referring to an overlap due to a correction or change, and T indicating postmiles classified as temporary. Segments that remain unconstructed or have been relinquished to local control may be omitted. The numbers reset at county lines; the start and end postmiles in each county are given in the county column.

County	Location	Postmile	Destinations	Notes
Mendocino; MEN 0.00-9.85	Hopland	0.00	US 101 – Ukiah, Santa Rosa	West end of SR 175
Lake; LAK 0.00-28.04		R8.19 R40.14 (Note: Indicates that the postmile represents the distance along SR 29 rather than SR 175.)	SR 29 north / South Main Street – Lakeport	West end of SR 29 overlap
Lake; LAK 0.00-28.04		31.05 8.25	SR 29 south – Lower Lake	East end of SR 29 overlap
Lake; LAK 0.00-28.04	Middletown	28.04	SR 29 (Calistoga Road) / Main Street – Lower Lake, Calistoga	East end of SR 175
1.000 mi = 1.609 km; 1.000 km = 0.621 mi: Concurrency terminus
