= Calpella, California =

Calpella
- Census-designated place
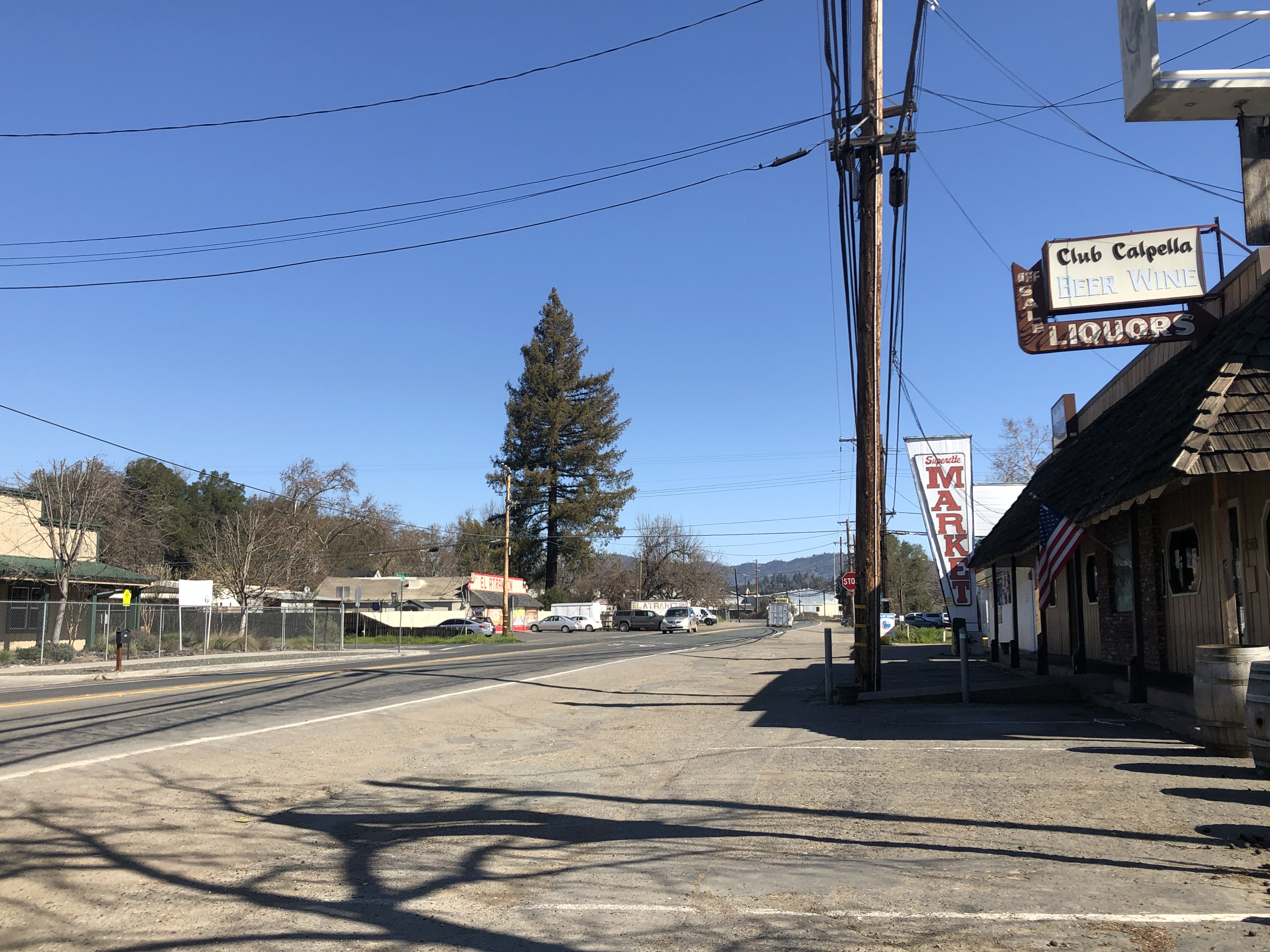
- Downtown Calpella in 2021

- Location in Mendocino County and California

- Location within California Location within the United States
- Coordinates: 39°14′01″N 123°12′14″W
- Country: United States
- State: California
- County: Mendocino

Area
  - Total: 2.57 sq mi (6.7 km^{2})
  - Land: 2.55 sq mi (6.6 km^{2})
  - Water: 0.03 sq mi (0.078 km^{2}) 0.93%
- Elevation: 682 ft (208 m)

Population (2020)
  - Total: 799
  - Density: 313.58/sq mi (121.07/km^{2})
- Time zone: UTC-8 (Pacific (PST))
  - Summer (DST): UTC-7 (PDT)
- ZIP Code: 95418
- Area code: 707
- GNIS feature IDs: 1658196; 2628714

Calpella (Pomo: Kalpela, meaning "Mussel bearer") is an unincorporated community and census-designated place (CDP) in Mendocino County, California, United States. It is located on the Russian River, 6 miles (10 km) north of Ukiah. It is situated within the Ukiah Valley, at the intersection of U.S. Route 101 and State Route 20. The population was 799 at the 2020 census, up from 679 in 2010. The small town is the site of the Mendocino Redwood Company mill and offices, which controls ten percent of the private land in the county.

== History ==
Col. C.H. Veeder and James Pettus, Veeder's son-in-law, founded the town in 1858. It is named after Kalpela, the chief of the nearby Pomo village of Chomchadila. His name comes from Northern Pomo khál phíila, meaning "carrying mussels down".

For a time, it rivaled Ukiah in importance.

The Calpella post office opened in 1860, closed in 1868, reopened in 1872, was discontinued for a time, and moved in 1920.

== Geography ==
Calpella is in southeastern Mendocino County, 6 miles (10 km) north of Ukiah, the county seat, 16 miles (26 km) south of Willits, and 29 miles (47 km) northwest of Lakeport. According to the United States Census Bureau, the Calpella CDP covers an area of 2.6 square miles (6.7 km^{2}), of which 99.07% is land and 0.93% is water. The Russian River flows north-to-south through the center of the community, and the CDP extends eastward to the west shore of Lake Mendocino, a reservoir on the East Fork of the Russian River. U.S. Route 101 passes through the western portion of the CDP, and California State Route 20 forms the CDP's northern edge.

=== Climate ===
This region experiences warm (but not hot) and dry summers, with no average monthly temperatures above 71.6 °F (22.0 °C). According to the Köppen Climate Classification system, Calpella has a warm-summer Mediterranean climate, abbreviated "Csb" on climate maps.

== Demographics ==
Historical population
Census	Pop.	Note	%±
2010	679		—
2020	799		17.7%
U.S. Decennial Census; 1850–1870 1880-1890; 1900 1910 1920; 1930 1940 1950; 1960 1970 1980; 1990 2000 2010

Calpella first appeared as a census designated place in the 2010 U.S. census.

=== 2020 census ===
As of the 2020 census, Calpella had a population of 799. The population density was 313.6 inhabitants per square mile (121.1/km^{2}). 64.2% of residents lived in urban areas, while 35.8% lived in rural areas.

The age distribution was 175 people (21.9%) under the age of 18, 79 people (9.9%) aged 18 to 24, 201 people (25.2%) aged 25 to 44, 216 people (27.0%) aged 45 to 64, and 128 people (16.0%) who were 65 years of age or older. The median age was 39.5 years. For every 100 females, there were 109.2 males, and for every 100 females age 18 and over there were 107.3 males age 18 and over.

The whole population lived in households. There were 279 households, of which 36.2% had children under the age of 18 living in them. Of all households, 49.5% were married-couple households, 25 (9.0%) were cohabiting couple households, 62 (22.2%) had a female householder with no partner present, and 54 (19.4%) had a male householder with no partner present. About 22.9% of all households were made up of individuals and 12.2% had someone living alone who was 65 years of age or older. The average household size was 2.86. There were 195 families (69.9% of all households).

There were 299 housing units at an average density of 117.3 units per square mile (45.3 units/km^{2}), of which 279 (93.3%) were occupied and 6.7% were vacant. The homeowner vacancy rate was 1.3% and the rental vacancy rate was 0.0%. Of occupied units, 151 (54.1%) were owner-occupied, and 128 (45.9%) were occupied by renters.

Racial composition as of the 2020 census
Race	Number	Percent
White	442	55.3%
Black or African American	1	0.1%
American Indian and Alaska Native	28	3.5%
Asian	14	1.8%
Native Hawaiian and Other Pacific Islander	2	0.3%
Some other race	206	25.8%
Two or more races	106	13.3%
Hispanic or Latino (of any race)	348	43.6%

== Government ==
In the state legislature, Calpella is in the 2nd senatorial district, represented by Democrat Mike McGuire, and the 2nd Assembly district, represented by Democrat Chris Rogers.

Federally, Calpella is in California's 2nd congressional district, represented by Democrat Jared Huffman.

== See also ==
- Northwestern Pacific Railroad
- Waldorf School of Mendocino County
