= Ukiah Valley =

Valley in California, United States

Coordinates: 39.1867°N 123.2052°W

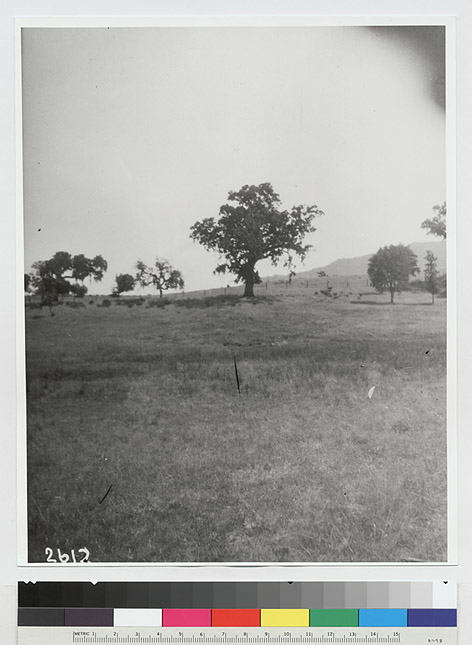
Ukiah Valley photographed in 1904

Ukiah Valley is a valley located in Mendocino County, California, United States. It contains the Mendocino County seat of Ukiah. It also is home to the unincorporated towns of Redwood Valley, Calpella, Potter Valley and Talmage. Lake Mendocino and the headwaters of the Russian River are located in the greater Ukiah valley. The river flows southeast through the valley, passing through a rocky constriction into the Sanel Valley to the south.

While part of the greater Ukiah area, Willits is located to the north of the Ukiah Valley in Little Lake Valley, part of the Eel River drainage basin. It is connected to the Ukiah Valley by U.S. Route 101 over Ridgewood Summit.

Linguistically, "Ukiah Valley" is redundant: "Ukiah" comes from the Central Pomo word yokaya, meaning 'south valley'. The northern part of the valley was originally inhabited by the Northern Pomo, while the southern part was inhabited by the Central Pomo. The Central Pomo village of Yokaia, south of Ukiah, existed until the 20th century.
