= Finley, California =

Unincorporated community in California, United States

Finley
- Unincorporated community
- Location in California Finley (the United States)
- Coordinates: 39°00′16″N 122°52′32″W
- Country: United States
- State: California
- County: Lake
- Elevation: 1,352 ft (412 m)
- ZIP code: 95435

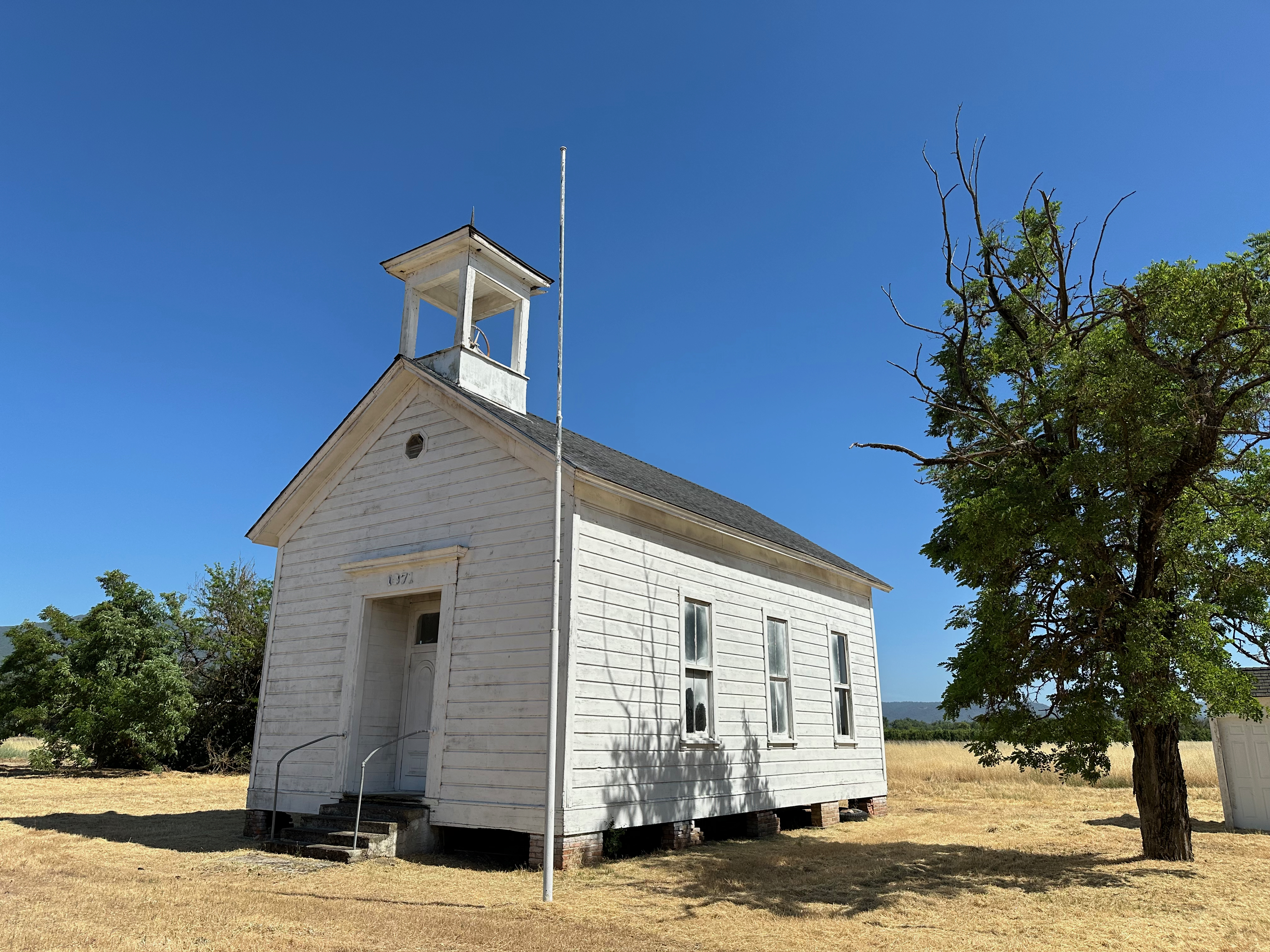
Historic Kelsey Creek Schoolhouse in Finley, California

Finley is an unincorporated community in Lake County, California, United States. It is located 3.5 miles (6 km) southeast of Lakeport, at an elevation of 1,352 feet (412 m).

The first post office at Finley opened in 1907. The name is for settler Samuel Finley Sylar.

== Climate ==
This region experiences warm (but not hot) and dry summers, with no average monthly temperatures above 71.6 °F. According to the Köppen Climate Classification system, Finley has a warm-summer Mediterranean climate, abbreviated "Csb" on climate maps.
