= Hopland, California =

Unincorporated community in California, United States

Hopland
- Census-designated place
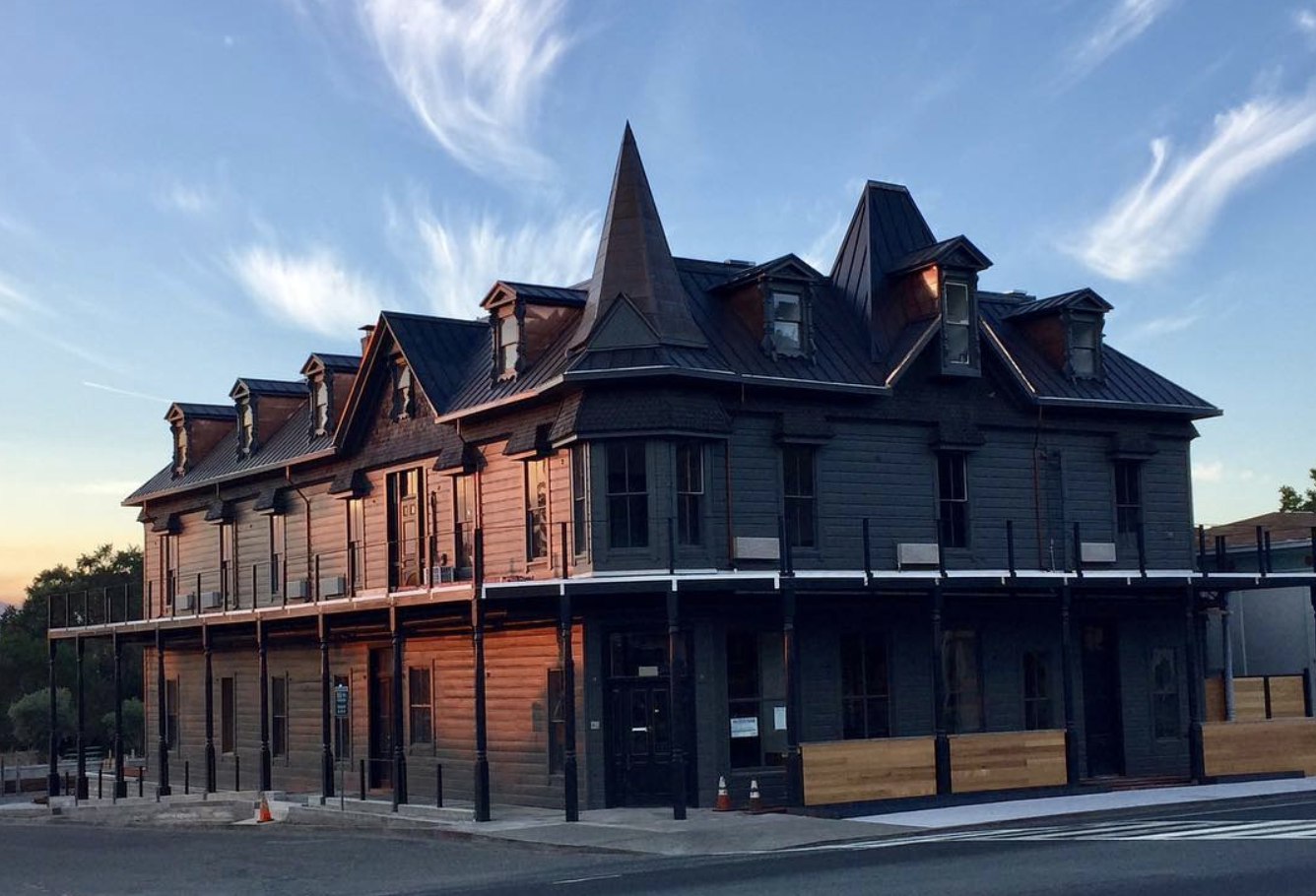
- Downtown Hopland

- Location in Mendocino County and California

- Location within California Location within the United States
- Coordinates: 38°58′23″N 123°06′59″W
- Country: United States
- State: California
- County: Mendocino

Area
  - Total: 3.573 sq mi (9.25 km^{2})
  - Land: 3.525 sq mi (9.13 km^{2})
  - Water: 0.048 sq mi (0.12 km^{2}) 1.35%
- Elevation: 502 ft (153 m)

Population (2020)
  - Total: 661
  - Density: 188/sq mi (72.4/km^{2})
- Time zone: UTC-8 (Pacific)
  - Summer (DST): UTC-7 (PDT)
- ZIP code: 95449
- Area code: 707
- FIPS code: 06-34652
- GNIS feature IDs: 1658778; 2628739

Hopland (formerly Sanel) is a census-designated place in Mendocino County, California, United States. It is located on the west bank of the Russian River, 13 miles (21 km) south-southeast of Ukiah, in the Sanel Valley, at an elevation of 502 feet (153 m). The population was 661 at the 2020 census, down from 756 at the 2010 census.

Hopland is located at the start of the North Coast or Redwood Coast region of Northern California. It is 100 miles (161 km) north of San Francisco along U.S. Route 101 and a 30-minute drive (17 miles [27 km] east along State Route 175) to California's largest natural lake, Clear Lake. Hopland is a rustic farming community situated among oak-covered coastal foothills. Summer temperatures can exceed 100 °F (38 °C).

Historic buildings in town include the old Hopland High School (c. 1923–1965), as well as the Thatcher Hotel, built in the late 1800s and reopened in 2019 after undergoing a complete renovation.

Approximately 5 mi (8 km) east of Hopland is the University of California's Hopland Research and Extension Center (formerly called the "Hopland Field Station"), a 5,300-acre (21.4 km^{2}) research and education facility that UC has operated since 1951.

== Geography ==
Hopland is in southeastern Mendocino County, along U.S. Route 101, which leads north-northwest 14 miles (23 km) to Ukiah, the county seat, and southeast 46 miles (74 km) to Santa Rosa, the Sonoma County seat. According to the United States Census Bureau, the Hopland CDP covers an area of 3.6 square miles (9.3 km^{2}), 98.65% of it land and 1.35% of it water. The Russian River flows southward through the eastern side of the community, separating the main village of Hopland from Old Hopland, also part of the CDP, on the eastern side of the river.

== Climate ==
Monthly climate averages (1989–1993)
Month	High (°F)	Low (°F)	Precip. (inches)
January	57	36	4.89
February	60	40	5.98
March	62	41	6.47
April	67	43	1.16
May	74	47	1.98
June	82	51	0.72
July	90	55	0.03
August	90	55	0.05
September	87	53	0.35
October	78	49	1.18
November	65	41	3.72
December	57	35	4.17

== History ==
The Hopland Band of Pomo Indians, or Sho-Ka-Wah, are Central Pomo people who have lived in Hopland since "the beginning of time". The Sho-Ka-Wah lived their lives hunting, gathering, making, practicing spirituality and generally living their lives. Their main village, population 1,500, was called "Shanel". After the settlers came, they were forced to move, and then to move again. Today most of the Sho-Ka-Wah people live in the Hopland reservation 5 miles (8 km) east of Hopland. They have a gambling facility and other businesses to support their community. The community also engages in spirituality, dance traditions, and caring for the land.

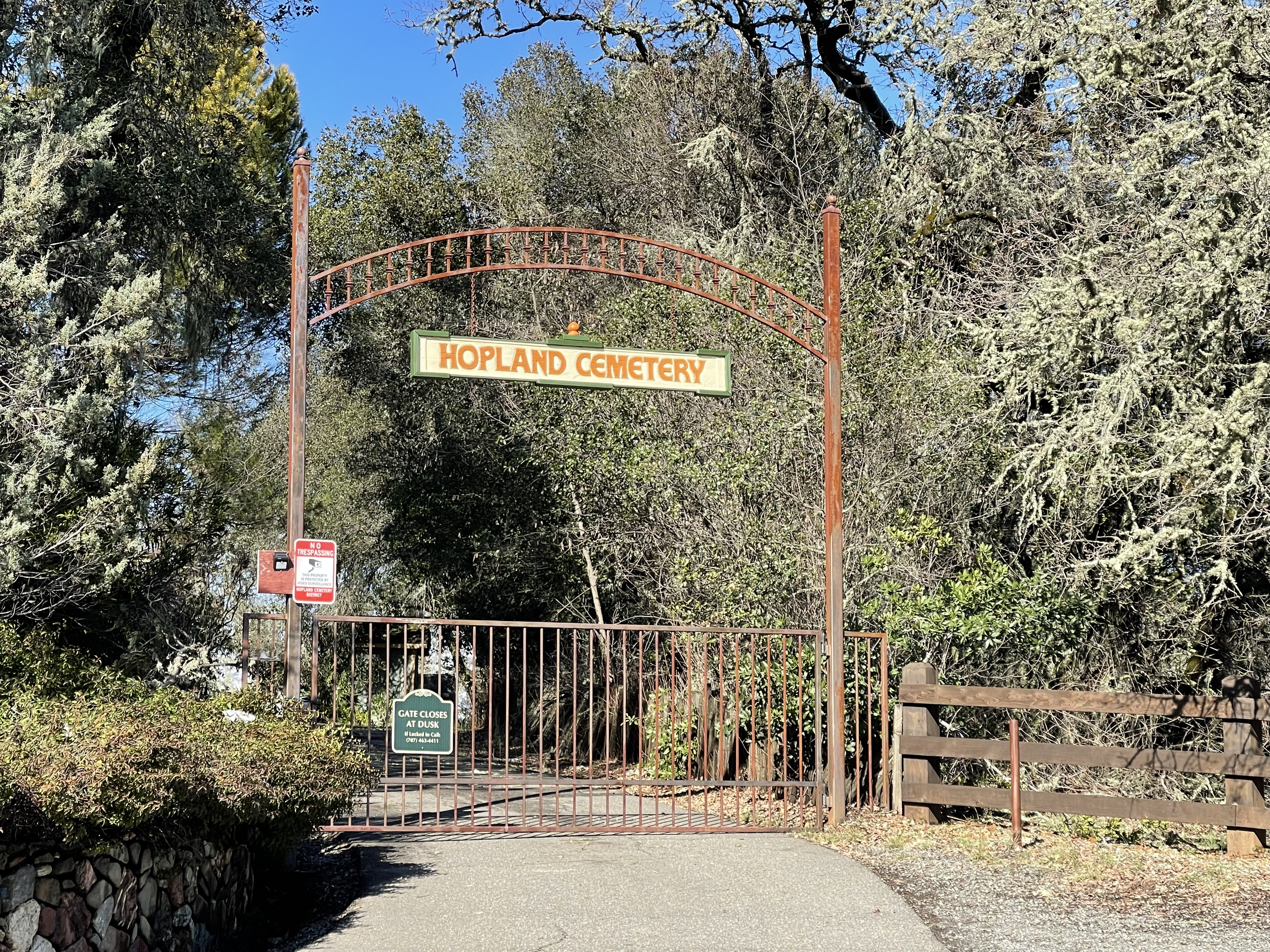
Historic Hopland Cemetery in Hopland

The settlement that became Hopland was originally called "Sanel". Over the years it was centered on either side of the Russian River. Sanel began on the west bank of the river in 1859. In 1874, the town moved to the east bank to be connected to the toll road built to there. When the railroad arrived on the west side of the river, the town moved back to its original site, leaving Old Hopland (38°58′33″N 123°06′01″W) on the east bank.

The Sanel post office opened in 1860, closed for a time in 1869, moved and changed its name to Hopland in 1879, reverted to its original site and name in 1890, and finally changed its name back to Hopland in 1891. The town gets its name from the fact that from the 1870s to the mid-1950s, much of the region's economy was based on the growing and drying of bitter hops, a key flavoring and preservative in beer. This began in 1868 when L.F. Long established the first hop farm some 4 miles (6 km) north, where the railroad station called Largo (Spanish for "long", after Samuel F. Long) was later located. Downy mildew pushed hops out of the area completely by the late 1950s.

== Demographics ==
Historical population
Census	Pop.	Note	%±
2010	756		—
2020	661		−12.6%
U.S. Decennial Census; 2010

Hopland first appeared as a census designated place in the 2010 U.S. census.

The 2020 United States census reported that Hopland had a population of 661. The population density was 187.5 inhabitants per square mile (72.4/km^{2}). The racial makeup of Hopland was 62.8% White, 0.0% African American, 4.1% Native American, 2.1% Asian, 0.0% Pacific Islander, 18.9% from other races, and 12.1% from two or more races. Hispanic or Latino of any race were 35.7% of the population.

The whole population lived in households. There were 255 households, out of which 30.6% included children under the age of 18, 43.5% were married-couple households, 10.2% were cohabiting couple households, 22.7% had a female householder with no partner present, and 23.5% had a male householder with no partner present. 28.2% of households were one person, and 9.8% were one person aged 65 or older. The average household size was 2.59. There were 162 families (63.5% of all households).

The age distribution was 22.1% under the age of 18, 3.8% aged 18 to 24, 26.5% aged 25 to 44, 31.0% aged 45 to 64, and 16.6% who were 65 years of age or older. The median age was 42.6 years. For every 100 females, there were 109.8 males.

There were 280 housing units at an average density of 79.4 units per square mile (30.7 units/km^{2}), of which 255 (91.1%) were occupied. Of these, 48.6% were owner-occupied, and 51.4% were occupied by renters.

== Government ==
In the state legislature, Hopland is in the 2nd senatorial district, represented by Democrat Mike McGuire, and the 2nd Assembly district, represented by Democrat Chris Rogers.

Federally, Hopland is in California's 2nd congressional district, represented by Democrat Jared Huffman.

== Media ==
- KORB 88.7 MHz, the only FM broadcast station licensed to Hopland

== See also ==
- Northwestern Pacific Railroad
