= Springs of Lake County, California =

The Springs of Lake County, California are natural springs, some of which are warm and/or rich in minerals, in Lake County, California. During the 19th century and the early part of the 20th century resorts were often founded around these springs, where bathing and drinking the water was thought to be beneficial to the health. A partial list follows.

== List ==
Name	GNIS id	Coords	Elevation		Usage	1910–1911 location description (Note: Unless otherwise notes, the descriptions are adapted from Waring (1915), who visited the region in 1910 and 1911.)
Name	GNIS id	Coords	ft	m	Usage	1910–1911 location description
Adams Springs	1657887	38.8563°N 122.7197°W	2828	862	Resort	Situated in a deep ravine about 2 miles eastward across a divide from Astorg Spring
Allen Springs	256188	39.1597°N 122.6647°W	1926	587	Resort	Situated in the narrow canyon of Alien Creek, on the stage road about 4 miles west of Hough Springs
Alum Spring						Seeps from a claylike layer in bedded gravel and volcanic ash, beneath a small bank on the side of a ravine at the southwest base of Chalk Mountain
Anderson Springs	218270	38.7749°N 122.6930°W	1404	428	Resort	Situated about 5 miles northwest of Middletown, along a branch of Putah Creek. A resort has been conducted at this place for many years, and in 1910 a hotel and several cottages provided accommodations for 150 guests.
Astorg Spring						A number of years ago a short prospect tunnel was run into the hillside three-quarters of a mile south of east from Glenbrook post office... for a short time the water was shipped in tanks to San Francisco, carbonated, and bottled as a table water.
Baker Soda Spring						A small carbonated spring, about halfway between Lower Lake and Reiff post office. Its water has been used to small extent for drinking.
Bartlett Springs	256529	39.1838°N 122.7044°W	2129	649	Resort	Situated on the north side of a branch of North Fork of Cache Creek, and mainly on the slopes some distance above the stream.
Bonanza Springs	1658105	38.8643°N 122.6869°W	2638	804	Resort	Situated in a grove on a gentle slope bordering a ravine, about 3 miles north of east from Adams Springs, and halfway between Seigler and Howard springs. The property has been a camping resort for a number of years.
Bynum Spring						Situated a mile south of Glen Alpine Springs, in a small ravine that is a tributary to Scott Creek. Its water rises from crushed sandstone near the edge of the stream channel, in a cemented pool about the size of a barrel. The water has been bottled at the spring and marketed locally as a table water.
Carlsbad Springs						Situated along Cole Creek where the creek flows in a brushy ravine. The property was conducted _as a small resort for several years prior to 1905, but it has been deserted since about that year, and in the summer of 1908 a brush fire destroyed the hotel building.
Castle Rock Springs	1658235	38.7702°N 122.7167°W	2342	714	Resort	Situated about 1 mile by steep trail on the mountain side west of Anderson Springs. Basins or small reservoirs have been excavated and cemented at two hot springs that issue a few yards apart in a ravine that is a tributary to Putah Creek.
Complexion Springs	258623	39.1700°N 122.5133°W	1706	520		Three pools, which are situated on the slope 50 yards east of the bed of a ravine about 325 yards north of the road between Leesville and Hough Springs, and 2 miles west of the divide at the boundary between Lake and Colusa counties
Crabtree Hot Springs	258851	39.2899°N 122.8222°W	2251	686	Resort	Situated in a narrow part of the canyon of Rices Fork of Eel River, 14 miles by road northwest of Bartlett Springs
Dinsmore Soda Springs						A carbonated spring of seeping flow that issues on the Dinsmore ranch, at the west edge of Wolf Creek, has long been protected by a concrete curb and used for drinking
England Springs						Eight miles south of Kelseyville a number of small carbonated springs issue near a road that was formerly the main road to Cloverdale by way of The Geysers. In 1910 the property near the springs was abandoned or used only as a goat range.
Gordon Hot Spring						Rises on the eastern side of Cobb Valley Creek, near the head of a small meadow. A number of years ago this spring was used to some extent for bathing,
Gifford Springs					Resort	Gifford Springs are about 10 miles by road northwest of Middletown and 1 1/4 miles east of the stage road, on a small mountain ranch. Several years prior to 1910 the property was opened to the public as a mountain resort.
Glen Alpine Springs						On the western bank of Scott Creek, 6 miles southwest of Lakeport and beside the wagon road between that town and Hopland, two small springs rise in bricked and cemented basins about 4 yards apart.
Grizzly Springs	224647	39.0018°N 122.4983°W	1286	392	Resort	On the northern side of Grizzly Canyon, about 2 1/2 miles above its junction with Cache Creek. As the springs are beside a main road that leads up the canyon and across the divide into Colusa County, they have been known for many years, but they have been improved only since about 1908.
Harbin Hot Springs	1658709	38.7877°N 122.6555°W	1568	478	Resort	In southern Lake County, about 3 1/2 miles north of Middletown. Three springs ... rise close together in a ravine on the western side of a branch of Putah Creek.
Hayvilla Sulphur Spring						In an open drainage course 5 miles northwest of the town of Upper Lake there is a sulphur spring whose water has been used to some extent for bathing and drinking.
Hazel Springs	261199	39.2105°N 122.8312°W	3330	1015	Resort	About 8 miles northeast of Upper Lake, at Hazel Springs (formerly known as Dennison Springs), two small carbonated springs issue about 20 yards apart. The property has been used at times as a summer camping resort, but during July, 1910, it was closed to the public
Highland Springs	1658749	38.9371°N 122.9069°W	1480	451	Resort	Situated on the stage road between Hopland and Kelseyville and 6 miles southwest of the latter place.
Hoppins Springs					Resort	The property of Hoppins Springs, which joins the eastern boundary of that of Bartlett Springs, has been improved to some extent as a resort by the erection of several cottages for light housekeeping.
Hough Springs	261564	39.1624°N 122.6122°W	1542	470	Resort	Situated in the canyon of North Fork of Cache Creek, on the stage road from Williams to Bartlett Springs. The property has long been improved as a summer resort.
Howard Springs	1658789	38.8582°N 122.6747°W	2152	656	Resort	About 9 miles southwest of the town of Lower Lake a group of mineral springs, several of which are notably warm
Lee Soda Spring						A small unimproved carbonated spring on the Lee ranch in the canyon of Scott Creek about 4 miles in a direct line southwest of Lakeport. Its water is cool and moderately carbonated, but the place is rather inaccessible and is seldom visited.
Morton Soda Spring						Situated near the mouth of Soda Creek, which joins South Fork of Eel River about 2 miles south of west of Hullville. The spring yields a small flow of cool carbonated water that is very pleasant for drinking, but it has been known and used only locally.
Newman Springs	264076	39.1963°N 122.7158°W	2146	654	Resort	About 1 1/2 miles north of west from Bartlett Springs, and issue along the channel of Soap Creek; hence they are sometimes referred to as the Soap Creek Springs.
Paramore Spring	1656208	39.3135°N 122.8800°W	2149	655		Situated on a branch of Rices Fork of Eel River, about 4 miles in a direct line northwest of Crabtree Springs. The spring is in a deep, brushy ravine and is not easily accessible, but the place has been visited occasionally by campers.
Quigley Soda Springs						Three carbonated springs that emerge about a quarter of a mile from each other on the Quigley place, 14 miles by road north of the town of Lower Lake, have been surrounded by concrete basins so as to form drinking pools
Royal Spring	265637	39.2299°N 122.7456°W	2231	680	Resort	About 7 miles west of north from Bartlett Springs, and 2 miles by a slightly used road running north from the dairy ranch in Twin Valley.
Saratoga Springs	1659793	39.1752°N 122.9808°W	1424	434	Resort	On the side of a wide, brushy drainage ravine about 2 miles in a direct line southeast.of Witter Medical Springs.
Seigler Springs	1659622	38.8740°N 122.6886°W	2264	690	Resort	Situated about 2 miles northwest of Howard Springs, across a ridge and in the drainage basin of another creek. Like Howard Springs, they have been used as a resort for many years.
Soda Bay Springs	1659810	39.0010°N 122.7891°W	1401	427	Resort	Situated at the western side of Clear Lake, near the north base of Mount Konocti, a lava peak that rises high above the lake.
Spiers Springs						Situated about 3 miles in a direct line southeast of Bonanza Springs, in the canyon of the main branch of Putah Creek. Two springs of similar character issue a few yards apart at this place and each discharges 7 or 8 gallons a minute.
Sulphur Bank Hot Springs	267887	39.0038°N 122.6664°W	1342	409	Mine	Near the southeast edge of the eastern arm of Clear Lake there are abandoned sulphur and quicksilver workings. During the period of mining, water at a temperature of 176° was encountered at the fifth level.
Witter Springs	1666666	39.1910°N 122.9936°W	1647	502	Resort	Situated 20 miles north of east from Ukiah, on a hillside that overlooks the valley at the northern end of Clear Lake.

== Sources ==
- Waring, Gerald Ashley (1915). Springs of California. U.S. Geological Survey Water Supply Paper. Vol. 338. U.S. Government Printing Office. doi:10.3133/wsp338.
