= Bartlett Creek =

Bartlett Creek may refer to:

- Bartlett Creek, Lake County, California
- Bartlett Creek, Tuolumne County, California
