= Bartlett =

Bartlett may refer to:

== Places ==
- Bartlett Bay, Canada, Arctic waterway
- Wharerātā, New Zealand, also known as Bartletts

=== United States ===
- Bartlett, Illinois
  - Bartlett station, a commuter railroad station
- Bartlett, Iowa
- Bartlett, Kansas
- Bartlett, Missouri
- Bartlett, Nebraska
- Bartlett, New Hampshire, a New England town
  - Bartlett (CDP), New Hampshire, a village in the town
  - Bartlett Haystack, a mountain
- Bartlett, Ohio
- Bartlett, Tennessee
- Bartlett, Texas
- Bartlett, Virginia
- Bartlett Creek (disambiguation)
- Bartlett Peak, a mountain in California
- Bartlett Pond (Plymouth, Massachusetts)

== Other uses ==
- Bartlett (surname)
- Bartlett (TV series)
- The Bartlett, the Faculty of the Built Environment at University College London
- Bartlett Glacier, in Antarctica
- Bartlett pear
- Bartlett's Familiar Quotations or simply Bartlett's
- Bartlett's test, in statistics
- MV Bartlett, former ferry in Alaska
- USNS Bartlett (T-AGOR-13), American oceanographic research ship

== See also ==
- Justice Bartlett (disambiguation)
- Bartlet
