= Forbes Creek =

Forbes Creek may refer to one of the following:

- Forbes Creek (California)
- Forbes Creek (Washington)
