= Barlett =

Barlett may refer to:

- Donald L. Barlett (1936–2024), an American investigative journalist
- Barlett-Hann window, a mathematical statistical mass function

== See also ==
- Bartlett (disambiguation)
