= Rivers of Lake County, California =

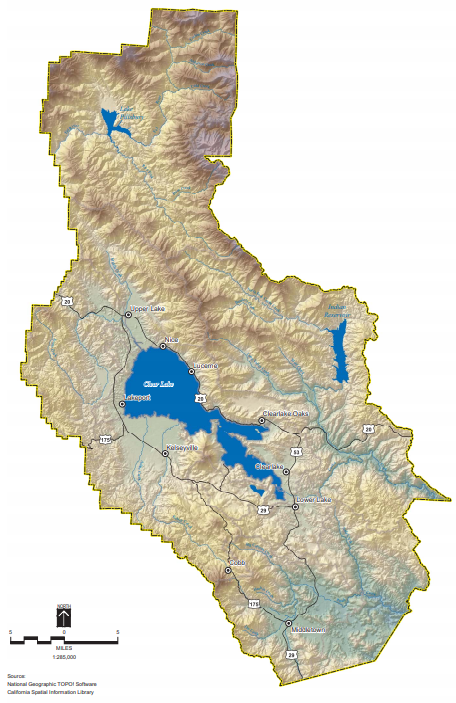
Topography of Lake County

Rivers and creeks in Lake County, California are listed below by river basin and alphabetically. Unless otherwise stated, the information is taken from the Geographic Names Information System maintained by the United States Geological Survey. Coordinates, elevations and lengths from this source are approximate.

== General ==
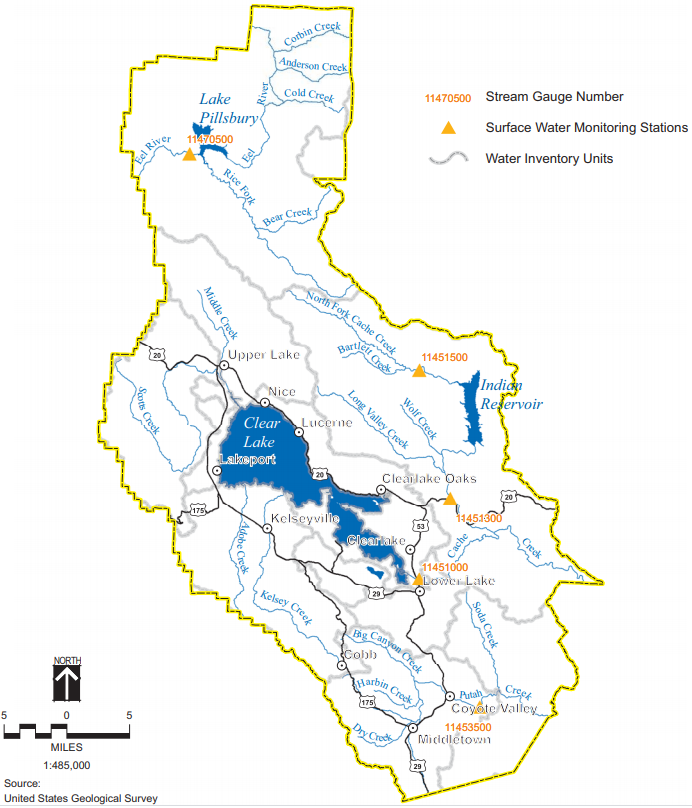
Surface water of Lake County

Lake County covers about 1,261 square miles (3,270 km^{2}) in the California Coastal Range. The rugged topography includes hills, mountains and valleys. The largest waterbody is Clear Lake, at an elevation of about 1,320 feet (400 m) above sea level. The three main drainages are Eel River, Cache Creek and Putah Creek, each of which have their headwaters in the county. Eel River drains the north of the county and flows west into Mendocino County. The center of the county drains into Clear Lake, which drains into Cache Creek, which flows east into Yolo County. The south of the county drains into Putah Creek, which flows south into Napa County. Eel River empties into the Pacific, while Cache Creek and Putah Creek flow into the Sacramento River valley.

Lake County has warm, dry summers, and cool, moist winters. In the summer, a continual tropical air mass typically creates high daytime temperatures and cool evening temperatures. In winter, a marine air mass typically keeps temperatures above 20 °F (−7 °C). Average monthly temperatures range from about 43°F during December through January to about 73°F during July through August. There are greater levels of precipitation at higher elevations and in the north and southwest of the county. Almost 90% of precipitation falls in winter, and there is very little rain from May to September.

== Geological changes ==
Clear Lake formed about 600,000 years ago as the land in the region began to subside when the Clear Lake Volcanic Field erupted. Its basin continues to move downward, while sedimentation keeps it shallow. The Clear Lake basin lies between the watersheds of the Sacramento River and the Russian River. When it was formed it drained east into the Sacramento Valley.

About 200,000 years ago the Clear Lake Volcanic Field blocked the lake's outlet. The lake rose until it found a new outlet, draining west through the Blue Lakes into Cold Creek and the Russian River. Clear Lake was almost 300 feet (91 m) higher than it is today, and Scotts Creek flowed into the lake from the west near where Lakeport is today. It formed a large delta there, which deposited the Lakeport ridge.

At some time in the last 10,000 years a landslide at the west end of the Blue Lakes blocked Clear Lake's outlet to the Russian River watershed. The lake rose again, and created its present outlet via Cache Creek to the Sacramento River. Cache Creek began eroding upstream to Clear Lake, and when it reached the lake the outflow along Cache Creek quickly eroded a channel through soft sediments. The lake dropped almost 300 feet (91 m) as a result.

== Basins ==
=== Eel River ===
Eel River flows through the northern part of the County and drains through Lake Pillsbury into Mendocino County. The Eel River’s drainage includes Corbin Creek, Anderson Creek, Cold Creek and Bear Creek. The drainage includes the highest point in Lake County, Snow Mountain. The Pacific Gas and Electric Company created Lake Pillsbury on the Eel River as part of its Potter Valley Project, which diverts water downstream on the Eel River to generate power, and releases the water into the East Fork Russian River. Diverted flows supplement Russian River water supplies in Mendocino and Sonoma Counties. Lake Pillsbury captures about one percent of the Eel River flow.

Stream	GNIS id	Parent	Mouth			Length	
Stream	GNIS id	Parent	Coords	Elev ft	Elev m	mi	km
Stream	GNIS id	Parent	all values are approximate				
Eel River	251974	Pacific Ocean	40°38′29″N 124°18′44″W	0	0	196	315
←←Middle Creek (Black Butte River)	263500	Black Butte River	39°35′42″N 122°51′31″W	3,402	1,037	3.5	5.6
←Elk Creek	259846	Middle Fork Eel River	39°40′35″N 123°08′02″W	1,138	347	16	26
←←Lookout Creek	227634	Elk Creek	39°31′37″N 123°00′14″W	2,431	741	3	4.8
←←Sulphur Springs Creek	235736	Elk Creek	39°33′27″N 123°01′56″W	1,785	544	4.5	7.2
←←Crocker Creek	221836	Elk Creek	39°33′36″N 123°02′10″W	1,755	535		
←←Forks Creek	223687	Elk Creek	39°34′26″N 123°02′46″W	1,562	476		
←←Bear Creek (Elk Creek)	218824	Elk Creek	39°34′44″N 123°02′45″W	1,519	463	5	8.0
←←Little Thatcher Creek	227389	Elk Creek	39°36′45″N 123°05′33″W	1,335	407		
←←Sanhedrin Creek	232532	Elk Creek	39°36′43″N 123°05′52″W	1,322	403		
←←←Bennett Creek	219041	Sanhedrin Creek	39°36′11″N 123°05′27″W	1,394	425		
Trout Creek (Eel River)	268433	Eel River	39°32′18″N 122°51′32″W	2,782	848	4	6.4
Horse Creek	261480	Eel River	39°31′29″N 122°51′05″W	2,694	821	3.25	5.23
Corbin Creek	258714	Eel River	39°31′43″N 122°51′01″W	2,684	818		
←Dutch Oven Creek E	259637	Corbin Creek	39°32′50″N 122°44′36″W	3,218	981		
←Five Spring Creek	260179	Corbin Creek	39°32′59″N 122°46′44″W	3,064	934	7.5	12.1
←Wescott Creek	268857	Corbin Creek	39°33′18″N 122°46′03″W	3,054	931		
←Dutch Oven Creek W	222774	Corbin Creek	39°32′32″N 122°47′47″W	2,926	892	2.25	3.62
Anderson Creek (Eel River)	256236	Eel River	39°30′32″N 122°50′45″W	2,572	784		
Rattlesnake Creek (Eel River)	267161	Eel River	39°29′37″N 122°51′21″W	2,493	760	5.5	8.9
←Little Round Mountain Creek	266925	Rattlesnake Creek (Eel River)	39°29′39″N 122°51′50″W	2,618	798	2	3.2
Cold Creek (Eel River)	258532	Eel River	39°28′17″N 122°49′59″W	2,474	754	6	9.7
Skeleton Creek	266231	Eel River	39°26′07″N 122°51′24″W	2,064	629	3	4.8
Copper Butte Creek	258698	Eel River	39°25′46″N 122°51′12″W	2,024	617	3.25	5.23
Berry Creek	256844	Eel River	39°25′30″N 122°51′23″W	1,955	596	1.5	2.4
Grapevine Creek (Eel River)	260776	Eel River	39°24′45″N 122°51′54″W	1,896	578	7.5	12.1
Hummingbird Creek	261621	Eel River	39°24′35″N 122°52′02″W	1,896	578	3.25	5.23
Rice Fork	267180	Eel River (Lake Pillsbury)	39°23′00″N 122°55′52″W	1,831	558		
←Salt Creek	265761	Rice Fork	39°17′20″N 122°49′12″W	2,277	694	3.25	5.23
←French Creek	260379	Rice Fork	39°17′27″N 122°50′05″W	2,172	662	4	6.4
←←Rock Creek	265486	French Creek	39°17′07″N 122°50′15″W	2,218	676	4	6.4
←Little Soda Creek	262728	Rice Fork	39°18′44″N 122°51′55″W	2,067	630	4	6.4
←Parramore Creek	264534	Rice Fork	39°18′51″N 122°52′01″W	2,057	627	4.5	7.2
←Bear Creek (Rice Fork)	256631	Rice Fork	39°19′30″N 122°52′15″W	2,031	619	7.5	12.1
←←Blue Slides Creek	257281	Bear Creek (Rice Fork)	39°19′13″N 122°50′52″W	2,159	658	4	6.4
←Bevans Creek	256858	Rice Fork	39°20′32″N 122°53′02″W	1,991	607	3.5	5.6
←Salt Glade Creek	265777	Rice Fork	39°20′55″N 122°53′21″W	1,959	597	1	1.6
←Rice Creek	267179	Rice Fork	39°21′19″N 122°53′08″W	1,955	596	7.5	12.1
←←Barker Creek	256517	Rice Creek	39°22′00″N 122°48′59″W	3,501	1,067	2	3.2
←←Dry Creek (Rice Creek)	259543	Rice Creek	39°20′41″N 122°51′41″W	2,126	648	2.25	3.62
←←McLeod Creek	263403	Rice Creek	39°20′56″N 122°52′11″W	2,067	630	1.5	2.4
←Packsaddle Creek	264441	Rice Fork	39°22′56″N 122°56′12″W	1,880	570	4	6.4
←Deer Creek	259218	Rice Fork	39°22′38″N 122°54′39″W	1,863	568	7	11
←Willow Creek (Rice Fork)	269147	Rice Fork	39°22′37″N 122°55′02″W	1,850	560	5	8.0
Smokehouse Creek	267275	Eel River (Lake Pillsbury)	39°26′38″N 122°57′52″W	1,831	558	9	14
←Boardman Creek	257305	Smokehouse Creek	39°29′34″N 122°58′19″W	2,306	703	2.5	4.0
Salmon Creek	232278	Eel River (Lake Pillsbury)	39°26′38″N 122°58′00″W	1,824	556	2.5	4.0
←Fuller Creek	260443	Salmon Creek	39°28′40″N 122°58′46″W	1,972	601	3	4.8
←Mill Creek (Salmon Creek)	263604	Salmon Creek	39°28′36″N 122°58′41″W	1,962	598	6.25	10.06
Squaw Valley Creek	235326	Eel River (Lake Pillsbury)	39°26′12″N 122°56′06″W	1,824	556	3.25	5.23
Salt Spring Creek	232336	Eel River (Lake Pillsbury)	39°25′15″N 122°54′56″W	1,863	568	2.25	3.62
Thistle Glade Creek	268225	Eel River	39°23′46″N 122°52′52″W	1,847	563	5.5	8.9
Soda Creek (Eel River)	234825	Eel River	39°24′38″N 122°58′44″W	1,709	521	2.5	4.0
←Welch Creek	268847	Soda Creek (Eel River)	39°26′21″N 122°59′08″W	1,837	560	3	4.8
←Panther Creek (Soda Creek)	264478	Soda Creek (Eel River)	39°26′21″N 122°59′08″W	1,837	560	5.25	8.45
←←Cedar Creek	220761	Panther Creek (Soda Creek)	39°26′30″N 123°03′01″W	3,035	925	1.5	2.4
Benmore Creek (Eel River)	256825	Eel River	39°24′17″N 122°59′38″W	1,699	518	3	4.8
Dashiell Creek	222032	Eel River	39°23′48″N 123°02′10″W	1,578	481	2	3.2
Bucknell Creek	233564	Eel River	39°22′37″N 123°03′05″W	1,552	473	8.5	13.7
Alder Creek (Eel River)	218090	Eel River	39°23′11″N 123°02′35″W	1,549	472	2	3.2
Mill Creek (Eel River)	228671	Eel River	39°23′05″N 123°06′55″W	1,496	456	4	6.4

=== Clear Lake ===
Clear Lake is the largest freshwater lake wholly within the state of California. The lake has an average depth of about 26 feet (7.9 m). Many important tributary streams drain into Clear Lake, including Kelsey Creek, Adobe Creek, Scotts Creek and Middle Creek. The streams flow over permeable geologic formations and percolate into the subsurface as groundwater recharge.

Stream	GNIS id	Parent	Mouth			Length	
Stream	GNIS id	Parent	Coords	Elev ft	Elev m	mi	km
Stream	GNIS id	Parent	all values are approximate				
Thurston Creek	236332	Clear Lake (Thurston Lake) (Note: Thurston Lake is a small body of saline water with no outlet, probably in a volcanic crater. It is near the southwest corner of Clear Lake, and is treated here is part of the Clear Lake basin.)	38°56′09″N 122°41′34″W	1,440	440	9	14
Manning Creek	228024	Clear Lake	39°00′00″N 122°54′21″W	1,378	420	6.25	10.06
←Thompson Creek (Manning Creek)	236266	Manning Creek	39°00′24″N 122°53′48″W	1,345	410	2.5	4.0
Forbes Creek	223663	Clear Lake	39°02′27″N 122°54′47″W	1,332	406	4.25	6.84
Molesworth Creek	228903	Clear Lake	38°56′17″N 122°38′09″W	1,332	406	2.5	4.0
Schindler Creek	265909	Clear Lake	39°01′22″N 122°40′01″W	1,332	406		
Kelsey Creek	262116	Clear Lake	39°01′14″N 122°48′58″W	1,329	405	22	35
←Jones Creek	226332	Kelsey Creek	38°49′16″N 122°43′04″W	2,529	771	1.5	2.4
←Houghton Creek	225685	Kelsey Creek	38°49′27″N 122°43′18″W	2,487	758	1.5	2.4
←Rush Creek	232020	Kelsey Creek	38°50′15″N 122°44′31″W	2,365	721	1	1.6
←Alder Creek (Kelsey Creek)	218088	Kelsey Creek	38°51′07″N 122°45′26″W	2,303	702	4	6.4
←←Lee Creek	226991	Alder Creek (Kelsey Creek)	38°49′51″N 122°45′33″W	2,582	787	2	3.2
←Sulphur Creek	235710	Kelsey Creek	38°51′22″N 122°45′45″W	2,277	694	2	3.2
←High Valley Creek	225284	Kelsey Creek	38°52′08″N 122°47′36″W	2,218	676	4.5	7.2
←Sweetwater Creek	235896	Kelsey Creek	38°54′19″N 122°51′10″W	1,535	468	4.25	6.84
←Widow Creek	237728	Kelsey Creek	38°54′30″N 122°51′28″W	1,526	465	1.5	2.4
←Cole Creek	258583	Kelsey Creek	39°01′04″N 122°48′55″W	1,332	406	1.5	2.4
←←McIntire Creek	228380	Cole Creek	38°56′34″N 122°48′59″W	1,647	502	4	6.4
Rumsey Slough	232013	Clear Lake	39°01′26″N 122°53′26″W	1,329	405	1.5	2.4
←Thompson Creek (Rumsey Slough)	236260	Rumsey Slough	39°01′07″N 122°53′35″W	1,332	406	1.25	2.01
Adobe Creek	256126	Clear Lake	39°01′43″N 122°52′41″W	1,325	404	11	18
←Highland Creek	225288	Adobe Creek	38°57′07″N 122°53′39″W	1,411	430	7	11
Lyons Creek	227867	Clear Lake	39°06′21″N 122°53′44″W	1,325	404	3.5	5.6
McGaugh Slough	263349	Clear Lake	39°01′37″N 122°51′50″W	1,325	404	4.25	6.84
←Hill Creek	225316	McGaugh Creek	38°59′34″N 122°51′44″W	1,355	413	3.5	5.6
Morrison Creek	263845	Clear Lake	39°05′45″N 122°48′15″W	1,325	404	2.25	3.62
Old Kelsey Creek	1766141	Clear Lake	39°01′10″N 122°48′16″W	1,325	404		
Rodman Slough	267193	Clear Lake	39°07′35″N 122°53′55″W	1,325	404	2.5	4.0
←Scotts Creek	234664	Rodman Slough	39°09′45″N 122°57′14″W	1,335	407	30	48
←←Black Oak Springs Creek	219393	Scotts Creek	39°08′07″N 123°02′25″W	2,037	621	2.5	4.0
←←Lyons Valley Creek	227871	Scotts Creek	39°06′57″N 123°02′52″W	1,975	602	1.5	2.4
←←Willow Creek (Scotts Creek)	237881	Scotts Creek	39°06′09″N 123°02′35″W	1,827	557	4	6.4
←←←Panther Creek (Willow Creek)	230298	Willow Creek (Scotts Creek)	39°05′21″N 123°03′27″W	2,080	630	2.5	4.0
←←South Fork Scotts Creek	235050	Scotts Creek	39°02′30″N 122°58′57″W	1,483	452	7	11
←←←Benmore Creek (South Fork Scotts Creek)	254604	South Fork Scotts Creek	39°01′21″N 122°58′55″W	1,522	464		
←←Pool Creek	230926	Scotts Creek	39°05′27″N 122°57′56″W	1,440	440		
←←Hendricks Creek	225171	Scotts Creek	39°06′02″N 122°57′47″W	1,398	426	5.25	8.45
←←Dorr Creek	266656	Scotts Creek	39°06′42″N 122°58′38″W	1,381	421	2.25	3.62
←←Cooper Creek	233711	Scotts Creek (Tule Lake)	39°10′07″N 122°57′35″W	1,339	408	6	9.7
←←←Dayle Creek	233760	Cooper Creek	39°10′31″N 122°57′56″W	1,342	409	4	6.4
←Robinson Creek	234576	Rodman Slough	39°08′41″N 122°54′28″W	1,332	406	4	6.4
←Middle Creek (Rodman Slough)	234282	Rodman Slough	39°08′54″N 122°54′45″W	1,329	405	8.5	13.7
←←Basin Creek	256573	Middle Creek (Rodman Slough)	39°35′34″N 122°51′33″W	3,448	1,051	1	1.6
←←West Fork Middle Creek	268908	Middle Creek (Rodman Slough)	39°15′04″N 122°57′04″W	1,480	450	6.5	10.5
←←←Bear Creek (West Fork Middle Creek)	266426	West Fork Middle Creek	39°16′14″N 122°58′33″W	1,598	487	2.5	4.0
←←East Fork Middle Creek	266680	Middle Creek (Rodman Slough)	39°15′03″N 122°57′04″W	1,476	450	9	14
←←Chair Creek	233652	Middle Creek (Rodman Slough)	39°14′15″N 122°56′43″W	1,450	440	2	3.2
←←Salt Flat Creek	234616	Middle Creek (Rodman Slough)	39°13′36″N 122°56′31″W	1,444	440	2	3.2
←←Kirkpatrick Creek	234111	Middle Creek (Rodman Slough)	39°13′10″N 122°56′08″W	1,430	440		
←←Clover Creek	233692	Middle Creek (Rodman Slough)	39°09′34″N 122°54′48″W	1,342	409	8	13
←←←Gilbert Creek	260558	Clover Creek	39°09′22″N 122°51′28″W	1,460	450	5.25	8.45
←←←Alley Creek	233407	Clover Creek	39°10′41″N 122°53′47″W	1,365	416	6.25	10.06
←←←←Poge Creek	234489	Alley Creek	39°11′01″N 122°53′34″W	1,368	417	3	4.8

=== Cache Creek ===
Cache Creek drains Clear Lake and flows eastward into Yolo County, then into the Sacramento River. Cache Creek has two major reaches in Lake County: the north fork and the main branch. The north fork drains an area north of the Clear Lake watershed through Indian Valley Reservoir, and includes Long Valley Creek, Wolf Creek, and Bartlett Creek. The main branch drains Clear Lake and flows eastward into Yolo County. Kelsey Creek, Adobe Creek, Scott’s Creek, and Middle Creek drain through Clear Lake to the main stem of Cache Creek.

Clear Lake and the Indian Valley Reservoir heavily influence the flow characteristics of Cache Creek. Unmanaged flows above the Indian Valley Reservoir on Cache Creek show a strong response to rainfall and low base flows. In contrast, managed flows on Cache Creek below the Indian Valley Reservoir and Clear Lake show a reduced influence of precipitation and increased base flows.

Stream	GNIS id	Parent	Mouth			Length	
Stream	GNIS id	Parent	Coords	Elev ft	Elev m	mi	km
Stream	GNIS id	Parent	all values are approximate				
Cache Creek	233595	Sacramento River	38.67751°N 121.6857°W	26	7.9	58	93
Clear Lake	258441	Cache Creek	38.93621°N 122.64294°W	1,325	404		
Hospital Creek	261547	Cache Creek	39°11′33″N 122°41′09″W	1,755	535	2.25	3.62
Copsey Creek	221548	Cache Creek	38°55′19″N 122°35′40″W	1,325	404	8	13
←Sweet Springs Creek	235890	Copsey Creek	38°51′22″N 122°38′02″W	1,539	469	1.25	2.01
←Harris Creek	224962	Copsey Creek	38°51′31″N 122°37′38″W	1,522	464	3	4.8
←Clayton Creek	221182	Copsey Creek	38°53′59″N 122°35′55″W	1,365	416	1.5	2.4
Herndon Creek	225207	Cache Creek	38°55′24″N 122°35′33″W	1,325	404	3.5	5.6
Seigler Canyon Creek	253836	Cache Creek	38°55′32″N 122°36′45″W	1,325	404	8	13
←Perini Creek	230526	Seigler Canyon Creek	38°54′12″N 122°38′20″W	1,450	440	2	3.2
Dry Creek (Cache Creek)	222609	Cache Creek	38°56′25″N 122°33′49″W	1,253	382	3.5	5.6
Davis Creek	222045	Cache Creek	38°54′19″N 122°22′34″W	1,043	318		
North Fork Cache Creek	234369	Cache Creek	38°58′52″N 122°30′12″W	945	288	36	58
←Rattlesnake Creek (North Fork Cache Creek)	265197	North Fork Cache Creek	39°14′41″N 122°48′22″W	2,323	708	2.5	4.0
←Alder Creek (North Fork Cache Creek)	256155	North Fork Cache Creek	39°14′36″N 122°48′06″W	2,300	700	2	3.2
←Wild Bill Creek	269072	North Fork Cache Creek	39°14′07″N 122°46′46″W	2,208	673	2.25	3.62
←Wyman Creek	269324	North Fork Cache Creek	39°13′06″N 122°43′53″W	2,001	610	2.5	4.0
←←Root Creek	265562	Wyman Creek	39°13′15″N 122°43′41″W	2,165	660	2.5	4.0
←Twin Valley Creek	255173	North Fork Cache Creek	39°13′17″N 122°44′04″W	1,995	608	5.25	8.45
←Soap Creek	267352	North Fork Cache Creek	39°11′57″N 122°42′34″W	1,890	580	2.5	4.0
←Ladybug Creek	262265	North Fork Cache Creek	39°11′59″N 122°42′31″W	1,844	562	2.5	4.0
←Kilpepper Creek	266882	North Fork Cache Creek (Indian Valley Reservoir)	39°10′03″N 122°30′25″W	1,726	526		
←Grapevine Creek (North Fork Cache Creek)	260775	North Fork Cache Creek	39°11′01″N 122°40′28″W	1,703	519	2	3.2
←Bartlett Creek	256527	North Fork Cache Creek	39°10′01″N 122°38′24″W	1,631	497	6.5	10.5
←←North Fork Bartlett Creek	234368	Bartlett Creek	39°10′36″N 122°44′07″W	2,133	650	3	4.8
←←South Fork Bartlett Creek	267423	Bartlett Creek	39°10′36″N 122°44′07″W	2,133	650	2.5	4.0
←Spanish Creek	267546	North Fork Cache Creek	39°10′10″N 122°36′54″W	1,529	466	1.5	2.4
←←East Fork Spanish Creek	259751	Spanish Creek	39°11′13″N 122°36′42″W	1,765	538	2.5	4.0
←←West Fork Spanish Creek	268917	Spanish Creek	39°11′16″N 122°36′41″W	1,699	518	3	4.8
←Stanton Creek	267675	North Fork Cache Creek	39°09′58″N 122°32′14″W	1,473	449	5.5	8.9
←Long Valley Creek	227620	North Fork Cache Creek	39°02′54″N 122°34′41″W	1,148	350	14	23
←←South Fork Valley Creek	267473	Long Valley Creek	39°06′06″N 122°41′41″W	1,332	406	5	8.0
←Wolf Creek	269265	North Fork Cache Creek	39°04′09″N 122°35′01″W	1,129	344	5.5	8.9
←←North Fork Wolf Creek	264221	Wolf Creek	39°07′35″N 122°38′49″W	2,080	630	3	4.8
←←South Fork Wolf Creek	267520	Wolf Creek	39°07′35″N 122°38′49″W	2,080	630	3	4.8
←Hog Hollow Creek	261398	North Fork Cache Creek	39°01′32″N 122°34′27″W	1,060	320	2.25	3.62
←Sweet Hollow Creek	268022	North Fork Cache Creek	39°01′06″N 122°33′59″W	1,040	320		
←Phipps Creek	230602	North Fork Cache Creek	38°59′58″N 122°33′20″W	1,020	310	2.25	3.62
←Indian Creek	261730	North Fork Cache Creek	38°59′51″N 122°33′08″W	1,010	310	5.5	8.9
←Grizzly Creek (North Fork Cache Creek)	266783	North Fork Cache Creek	38°59′19″N 122°32′24″W	994	303		
←Middle Creek (North Fork Cache Creek)	263504	North Fork Cache Creek	38°59′19″N 122°32′24″W	994	303	3.25	5.23
←Perkins Creek	230529	North Fork Cache Creek	38°59′04″N 122°31′16″W	968	295	5	8.0
Trout Creek (Cache Creek)	236564	Cache Creek	38°57′03″N 122°27′16″W	938	286	2	3.2
Rocky Creek	231763	Cache Creek	38°58′46″N 122°28′35″W	919	280	8.5	13.7
←Chandans Creek	220903	Rocky Creek	38°53′30″N 122°27′52″W	2,402	732	3	4.8
Brushy Creek	219944	Cache Creek	38°57′38″N 122°27′26″W	879	268	3	4.8

=== Putah Creek ===
Putah Creek drains the southwestern portion of Lake County, draining into Lake Berryessa in Napa County. Putah Creek’s drainage includes Harbin Creek, Big Canyon Creek, St. Helena Creek and Soda Creek. The drainage also includes Collayomi Valley, Long Valley and the Coyote Valley. The Putah Creek drainage mostly consists of direct rainfall runoff with a very little snowmelt and base flow. The Putah Creek basin in Lake County has no reservoirs to provide surface storage and regulate flows.

Stream	GNIS id	Parent	Mouth			Length	
Stream	GNIS id	Parent	Coords	Elev ft	Elev m	mi	km
Stream	GNIS id	Parent	all values are approximate				
Putah Creek	234522	Sacramento River	38.53006°N 121.7602°W	43	13		
Anderson Creek (Putah Creek)	218250	Putah Creek	38°46′28″N 122°41′20″W	1,316	401	4.5	7.2
←Gunning Creek	224743	Anderson Creek (Putah Creek)	38°46′52″N 122°42′36″W	1,676	511	2	3.2
←Bear Canyon Creek	218796	Anderson Creek (Putah Creek)	38°46′38″N 122°40′50″W	1,299	396	2	3.2
Dry Creek (Putah Creek)	222625	Putah Creek	38°45′37″N 122°36′55″W	1,079	329	6	9.7
←Appletree Creek	218323	Dry Creek (Putah Creek)	38°44′11″N 122°41′00″W	1,955	596	1.25	2.01
←South Fork Dry Creek	234997	Dry Creek (Putah Creek)	38°43′47″N 122°39′59″W	1,302	397	2	3.2
←Meyers Creek	228559	Dry Creek (Putah Creek)	38°44′37″N 122°39′03″W	1,260	380		
←Kroll Creek	226688	Dry Creek (Putah Creek)	38°43′59″N 122°39′08″W	1,224	373	1.5	2.4
←Herman Creek	225201	Dry Creek (Putah Creek)	38°43′48″N 122°39′32″W	1,217	371	2	3.2
←Black Rock Creek	219404	Dry Creek (Putah Creek)	38°43′48″N 122°39′27″W	1,214	370	1.5	2.4
←Hoodoo Creek	225530	Dry Creek (Putah Creek)	38°44′49″N 122°37′51″W	1,119	341	2.5	4.0
Saint Helena Creek	232162	Putah Creek	38°46′00″N 122°36′17″W	1,066	325	9	14
←Troutdale Creek	236573	Saint Helena Creek	38°40′01″N 122°35′19″W	1,598	487	2.5	4.0
←Grizzly Creek (Saint Helena Creek)	224629	Saint Helena Creek	38°41′32″N 122°35′51″W	1,384	422	1.5	2.4
←Bradford Creek	219757	Saint Helena Creek	38°42′07″N 122°36′01″W	1,316	401	2	3.2
←Hoffman Creek	225383	Saint Helena Creek	38°41′48″N 122°35′49″W	1,299	396	1.5	2.4
←Wilkinson Creek	237832	Saint Helena Creek	38°42′52″N 122°36′36″W	1,220	370	2	3.2
←Saint Marys Creek	232215	Saint Helena Creek	38°43′27″N 122°36′52″W	1,184	361	2.5	4.0
Big Canyon Creek	219152	Putah Creek	38°48′22″N 122°36′52″W	1,040	320	8	13
←Mill Creek (Big Canyon Creek)	228668	Big Canyon Creek	38°51′02″N 122°42′02″W	2,119	646	1.5	2.4
←Spikenard Creek	235198	Big Canyon Creek	38°50′59″N 122°40′31″W	1,640	500	2	3.2
←Bad Creek	218510	Big Canyon Creek	38°50′55″N 122°40′00″W	1,568	478	1	1.6
←Malo Creek	227987	Big Canyon Creek	38°49′54″N 122°38′41″W	1,270	390	2	3.2
Harbin Creek	224913	Putah Creek	38°47′10″N 122°36′23″W	1,040	320	5	8.0
Gallagher Creek	224012	Putah Creek	38°47′43″N 122°33′22″W	965	294	2	3.2
Coyote Creek	221730	Putah Creek	38°47′03″N 122°32′32″W	938	286	6	9.7
Crazy Creek	221811	Putah Creek	38°46′34″N 122°31′23″W	925	282	6.25	10.06
Soda Creek (Putah Creek)	253908	Putah Creek	38°47′46″N 122°29′17″W	778	237	10	16
←Asbill Creek	254578	Soda Creek (Putah Creek)	38°51′56″N 122°31′11″W	1,083	330	4.5	7.2
←Palmer Creek	230267	Soda Creek (Putah Creek)	38°51′32″N 122°30′51″W	1,060	320	3	4.8
←Gunther Creek	224745	Soda Creek (Putah Creek)	38°48′14″N 122°29′31″W	869	265	2	3.2
Bucksnort Creek	255073	Putah Creek	38°46′49″N 122°27′16″W	663	202		
←Cassidy Creek	220682	Bucksnort Creek	38°43′12″N 122°32′23″W	1,063	324	2.5	4.0
Butcherknife Creek	220274	Putah Creek	38°46′13″N 122°25′48″W	633	193	2	3.2
Hunting Creek	225798	Putah Creek	38°46′06″N 122°24′58″W	617	188	1.25	2.01
←Jericho Creek	226208	Hunting Creek	38°47′56″N 122°24′16″W	876	267	7	11
←←Hole Creek	225441	Jericho Creek	38°50′20″N 122°25′49″W	1,214	370	3.5	5.6
←John Thomas Creek	226282	Hunting Creek	38°47′27″N 122°24′30″W	853	260	2.5	4.0
Butts Creek	233590	Putah Creek	38°42′15″N 122°22′54″W	443	135	8	13
Pope Creek	234501	Putah Creek	38°37′22″N 122°15′56″W	443	135	17	27

=== Russian River ===
A few of the streams in Lake County are in the watershed of the Russian River to the west.

Stream	GNIS id	Parent	Mouth			Length	
Stream	GNIS id	Parent	Coords	Elev ft	Elev m	mi	km
Stream	GNIS id	Parent	all values are approximate				
←Cold Creek (East Fork Russian River)	221320	East Fork Russian River	39°14′51″N 123°07′44″W	833	254	8.5	13.7
←McDowell Creek	228352	Dooley Creek	38°59′03″N 123°00′04″W	1,821	555	7	11
←McClure Creek	228303	Mill Creek	39°08′01″N 123°10′40″W	594	181	7	11
←North Fork Mill Creek	254984	Mill Creek	39°07′53″N 123°09′24″W	646	197	5	8.0
Coleman Creek	221365	Russian River	38°55′18″N 123°02′47″W	594	181	8	13
←←Wildhorse Creek	237815	Squaw Creek	38°50′21″N 122°50′31″W	1,552	473	2.25	3.62
←Vasser Creek	237036	Coleman Creek	38°56′30″N 123°02′40″W	801	244	5	8.0

=== Stony Creek ===
Stony Creek is a tributary of the Sacramento River that drains a small part of northeast Lake County

Stream	GNIS id	Parent	Mouth			Length	
Stream	GNIS id	Parent	Coords	Elev ft	Elev m	mi	km
Stream	GNIS id	Parent	all values are approximate				
Bear Wallow Creek	218903	Middle Fork Stony Creek	39°24′48″N 122°42′42″W	3,373	1,028	3	4.8
Middle Fork Stony Creek	228603	Stony Creek	39°22′40″N 122°39′07″W	1,480	450		

== Alphabetical list ==
Stream	GNIS id	Parent	Mouth			Length	
Stream	GNIS id	Parent	Coords	Elev ft	Elev m	mi	km
Stream	GNIS id	Parent	all values are approximate				
Adobe Creek	256126	Clear Lake	39°01′43″N 122°52′41″W	1,325	404	11	18
Alder Creek (Eel River)	218090	Eel River	39°23′11″N 123°02′35″W	1,549	472	2	3.2
Alder Creek (Kelsey Creek)	218088	Kelsey Creek	38°51′07″N 122°45′26″W	2,303	702	4	6.4
Alder Creek (North Fork Cache Creek)	256155	North Fork Cache Creek	39°14′36″N 122°48′06″W	2,300	700	2	3.2
Alley Creek	233407	Clover Creek	39°10′41″N 122°53′47″W	1,365	416	6.25	10.06
Anderson Creek (Dry Creek)	218250	Putah Creek	38°46′28″N 122°41′20″W	1,316	401	4.5	7.2
Anderson Creek (Eel River)	256236	Eel River	39°30′32″N 122°50′45″W	2,572	784		
Appletree Creek	218323	Dry Creek	38°44′11″N 122°41′00″W	1,955	596	1.25	2.01
Asbill Creek	254578	Soda Creek	38°51′56″N 122°31′11″W	1,083	330	4.5	7.2
Bad Creek	218510	Big Canyon Creek	38°50′55″N 122°40′00″W	1,568	478	1	1.6
Barker Creek	256517	Rice Creek	39°22′00″N 122°48′59″W	3,501	1,067	2	3.2
Bartlett Creek	256527	North Fork Cache Creek	39°10′01″N 122°38′24″W	1,631	497	6.5	10.5
Basin Creek	256573	Middle Creek	39°35′34″N 122°51′33″W	3,448	1,051	1	1.6
Bear Canyon Creek	218796	Anderson Creek	38°46′38″N 122°40′50″W	1,299	396	2	3.2
Bear Creek (Elk Creek)	218824	Elk Creek	39°34′44″N 123°02′45″W	1,519	463	5	8.0
Bear Creek (Rice Fork)	256631	Rice Fork	39°19′30″N 122°52′15″W	2,031	619	7.5	12.1
Bear Creek (West Fork Middle Creek)	266426	West Fork Middle Creek	39°16′14″N 122°58′33″W	1,598	487	2.5	4.0
Bear Wallow Creek	218903	Middle Fork Stony Creek	39°24′48″N 122°42′42″W	3,373	1,028	3	4.8
Benmore Creek (Eel River)	256825	Eel River	39°24′17″N 122°59′38″W	1,699	518	3	4.8
Benmore Creek (South Fork Scotts Creek)	254604	South Fork Scotts Creek	39°01′21″N 122°58′55″W	1,522	464		
Bennett Creek	219041	Sanhedrin Creek	39°36′11″N 123°05′27″W	1,394	425		
Berry Creek	256844	Eel River	39°25′30″N 122°51′23″W	1,955	596	1.5	2.4
Bevans Creek	256858	Rice Fork	39°20′32″N 122°53′02″W	1,991	607	3.5	5.6
Big Canyon Creek	219152	Putah Creek	38°48′22″N 122°36′52″W	1,040	320	8	13
Black Oak Springs Creek	219393	Scotts Creek	39°08′07″N 123°02′25″W	2,037	621	2.5	4.0
Black Rock Creek	219404	Dry Creek	38°43′48″N 122°39′27″W	1,214	370	1.5	2.4
Blue Slides Creek	257281	Bear Creek	39°19′13″N 122°50′52″W	2,159	658	4	6.4
Boardman Creek	257305	Smokehouse Creek	39°29′34″N 122°58′19″W	2,306	703	2.5	4.0
Bradford Creek	219757	Saint Helena Creek	38°42′07″N 122°36′01″W	1,316	401	2	3.2
Brushy Creek	219944	Cache Creek	38°57′38″N 122°27′26″W	879	268	3	4.8
Bucknell Creek	233564	Eel River	39°22′37″N 123°03′05″W	1,552	473	8.5	13.7
Bucksnort Creek	255073	Putah Creek	38°46′49″N 122°27′16″W	663	202		
Butcherknife Creek	220274	Putah Creek	38°46′13″N 122°25′48″W	633	193	2	3.2
Butts Creek	233590	Putah Creek	38°42′15″N 122°22′54″W	443	135	8	13
Cache Creek	233595	Rodman Slough	38.67751°N 121.6857°W	26	7.9	58	93
Cassidy Creek	220682	Bucksnort Creek	38°43′12″N 122°32′23″W	1,063	324	2.5	4.0
Cedar Creek	220761	Panther Creek	39°26′30″N 123°03′01″W	3,035	925	1.5	2.4
Chair Creek	233652	Middle Creek	39°14′15″N 122°56′43″W	1,450	440	2	3.2
Chandans Creek	220903	Rocky Creek	38°53′30″N 122°27′52″W	2,402	732	3	4.8
Clayton Creek	221182	Copsey Creek	38°53′59″N 122°35′55″W	1,365	416	1.5	2.4
Clover Creek	233692	Middle Creek	39°09′34″N 122°54′48″W	1,342	409	8	13
Cold Creek (East Fork Russian River)	221320	East Fork Russian River	39°14′51″N 123°07′44″W	833	254	8.5	13.7
Cold Creek (Eel River)	258532	Eel River	39°28′17″N 122°49′59″W	2,474	754	6	9.7
Cole Creek	258583	Kelsey Creek	39°01′04″N 122°48′55″W	1,332	406	1.5	2.4
Coleman Creek	221365	Pieta Creek	38°55′18″N 123°02′47″W	594	181	8	13
Cooper Creek	233711	Tule Lake	39°10′07″N 122°57′35″W	1,339	408	6	9.7
Copper Butte Creek	258698	Eel River	39°25′46″N 122°51′12″W	2,024	617	3.25	5.23
Copsey Creek	221548	Cache Creek	38°55′19″N 122°35′40″W	1,325	404	8	13
Corbin Creek	258714	Eel River	39°31′43″N 122°51′01″W	2,684	818		
Coyote Creek	221730	Putah Creek	38°47′03″N 122°32′32″W	938	286	6	9.7
Crazy Creek	221811	Putah Creek	38°46′34″N 122°31′23″W	925	282	6.25	10.06
Crocker Creek	221836	Elk Creek	39°33′36″N 123°02′10″W	1,755	535		
Dashiell Creek	222032	Eel River	39°23′48″N 123°02′10″W	1,578	481	2	3.2
Davis Creek	222045	Cache Creek	38°54′19″N 122°22′34″W	1,043	318		
Dayle Creek	233760	Cooper Creek	39°10′31″N 122°57′56″W	1,342	409	4	6.4
Deer Creek	259218	Rice Fork	39°22′38″N 122°54′39″W	1,863	568	7	11
Dorr Creek	266656	Scotts Creek	39°06′42″N 122°58′38″W	1,381	421	2.25	3.62
Dry Creek (Cache Creek)	222609	Cache Creek	38°56′25″N 122°33′49″W	1,253	382	3.5	5.6
Dry Creek (Putah Creek)	222625	Putah Creek	38°45′37″N 122°36′55″W	1,079	329	6	9.7
Dry Creek (Rice Creek)	259543	Rice Creek	39°20′41″N 122°51′41″W	2,126	648	2.25	3.62
Dutch Oven Creek E	259637	Corbin Creek	39°32′50″N 122°44′36″W	3,218	981		
Dutch Oven Creek W	222774	Corbin Creek	39°32′32″N 122°47′47″W	2,926	892	2.25	3.62
East Fork Middle Creek	266680	Middle Creek	39°15′03″N 122°57′04″W	1,476	450	9	14
East Fork Spanish Creek	259751	Spanish Creek	39°11′13″N 122°36′42″W	1,765	538	2.5	4.0
Eel River	251974	Pacific Ocean	40°38′29″N 124°18′44″W	0	0	196	315
Elk Creek	259846	Middle Fork Eel River	39°40′35″N 123°08′02″W	1,138	347	16	26
Five Spring Creek	260179	Corbin Creek	39°32′59″N 122°46′44″W	3,064	934	7.5	12.1
Forbes Creek	223663	Clear Lake	39°02′27″N 122°54′47″W	1,332	406	4.25	6.84
{Forks Creek	223687	Elk Creek	39°34′26″N 123°02′46″W	1,562	476		
French Creek	260379	Rice Fork	39°17′27″N 122°50′05″W	2,172	662	4	6.4
Fuller Creek	260443	Salmon Creek	39°28′40″N 122°58′46″W	1,972	601	3	4.8
Gallagher Creek	224012	Putah Creek	38°47′43″N 122°33′22″W	965	294	2	3.2
Gilbert Creek	260558	Clover Creek	39°09′22″N 122°51′28″W	1,460	450	5.25	8.45
Grapevine Creek (Eel River)	260776	Eel River	39°24′45″N 122°51′54″W	1,896	578	7.5	12.1
Grapevine Creek (North Fork Cache Creek)	260775	North Fork Cache Creek	39°11′01″N 122°40′28″W	1,703	519	2	3.2
Grizzly Creek (North Fork Cache Creek)	266783	North Fork Cache Creek	38°59′19″N 122°32′24″W	994	303		
Grizzly Creek (Saint Helena Creek)	224629	Saint Helena Creek	38°41′32″N 122°35′51″W	1,384	422	1.5	2.4
Gunning Creek	224743	Anderson Creek	38°46′52″N 122°42′36″W	1,676	511	2	3.2
Gunther Creek	224745	Soda Creek	38°48′14″N 122°29′31″W	869	265	2	3.2
Harbin Creek	224913	Putah Creek	38°47′10″N 122°36′23″W	1,040	320	5	8.0
Harris Creek	224962	Copsey Creek	38°51′31″N 122°37′38″W	1,522	464	3	4.8
Hendricks Creek	225171	Scotts Creek	39°06′02″N 122°57′47″W	1,398	426	5.25	8.45
Herman Creek	225201	Dry Lake	38°43′48″N 122°39′32″W	1,217	371	2	3.2
Herndon Creek	225207	Cache Creek	38°55′24″N 122°35′33″W	1,325	404	3.5	5.6
High Valley Creek	225284	Kelsey Creek	38°52′08″N 122°47′36″W	2,218	676	4.5	7.2
Highland Creek	225288	Adobe Creek	38°57′07″N 122°53′39″W	1,411	430	7	11
Hill Creek	225316	McGaugh Creek	38°59′34″N 122°51′44″W	1,355	413	3.5	5.6
Hoffman Creek	225383	Saint Helena Creek	38°41′48″N 122°35′49″W	1,299	396	1.5	2.4
Hog Hollow Creek	261398	North Fork Cache Creek	39°01′32″N 122°34′27″W	1,060	320	2.25	3.62
Hole Creek	225441	Jericho Creek	38°50′20″N 122°25′49″W	1,214	370	3.5	5.6
Hoodoo Creek	225530	Dry Creek	38°44′49″N 122°37′51″W	1,119	341	2.5	4.0
Horse Creek	261480	Eel River	39°31′29″N 122°51′05″W	2,694	821	3.25	5.23
Hospital Creek	261547	Cache Creek	39°11′33″N 122°41′09″W	1,755	535	2.25	3.62
Houghton Creek	225685	Kelsey Creek	38°49′27″N 122°43′18″W	2,487	758	1.5	2.4
Hummingbird Creek	261621	Eel River	39°24′35″N 122°52′02″W	1,896	578	3.25	5.23
Hunting Creek	225798	Putah Creek	38°46′06″N 122°24′58″W	617	188	1.25	2.01
Indian Creek	261730	North Fork Cache Creek	38°59′51″N 122°33′08″W	1,010	310	5.5	8.9
Jericho Creek	226208	Hunting Creek	38°47′56″N 122°24′16″W	876	267	7	11
John Thomas Creek	226282	Hunting Creek	38°47′27″N 122°24′30″W	853	260	2.5	4.0
Jones Creek	226332	Kelsey Creek	38°49′16″N 122°43′04″W	2,529	771	1.5	2.4
Kelsey Creek	262116	Clear Lake	39°01′14″N 122°48′58″W	1,329	405	22	35
Kilpepper Creek	266882	Indian Valley Reservoir	39°10′03″N 122°30′25″W	1,726	526		
Kirkpatrick Creek	234111	Middle Creek	39°13′10″N 122°56′08″W	1,430	440		
Kroll Creek	226688	Dry Creek	38°43′59″N 122°39′08″W	1,224	373	1.5	2.4
Ladybug Creek	262265	North Fork Cache Creek	39°11′59″N 122°42′31″W	1,844	562	2.5	4.0
Lee Creek	226991	Alder Creek	38°49′51″N 122°45′33″W	2,582	787	2	3.2
Little Round Mountain Creek	266925	Rattlesnake Creek	39°29′39″N 122°51′50″W	2,618	798	2	3.2
Little Soda Creek	262728	Rice Fork	39°18′44″N 122°51′55″W	2,067	630	4	6.4
Little Thatcher Creek	227389	Elk Creek	39°36′45″N 123°05′33″W	1,335	407		
Long Valley Creek	227620	North Fork Cache Creek	39°02′54″N 122°34′41″W	1,148	350	14	23
Lookout Creek	227634	Elk Creek	39°31′37″N 123°00′14″W	2,431	741	3	4.8
Lyons Creek	227867	Clear Lake	39°06′21″N 122°53′44″W	1,325	404	3.5	5.6
Lyons Valley Creek	227871	Scotts Creek	39°06′57″N 123°02′52″W	1,975	602	1.5	2.4
Malo Creek	227987	Big Canyon Creek	38°49′54″N 122°38′41″W	1,270	390	2	3.2
Manning Creek	228024	Clear Lake	39°00′00″N 122°54′21″W	1,378	420	6.25	10.06
McClure Creek	228303	Mill Creek	39°08′01″N 123°10′40″W	594	181	7	11
McDowell Creek	228352	Dooley Creek	38°59′03″N 123°00′04″W	1,821	555	7	11
McGaugh Slough	263349	Clear Lake	39°01′37″N 122°51′50″W	1,325	404	4.25	6.84
McIntire Creek	228380	Cole Creek	38°56′34″N 122°48′59″W	1,647	502	4	6.4
McLeod Creek	263403	Rice Creek	39°20′56″N 122°52′11″W	2,067	630	1.5	2.4
Meyers Creek	228559	Dry Creek	38°44′37″N 122°39′03″W	1,260	380		
Middle Creek (Black Butte River)	263500	Black Butte River	39°35′42″N 122°51′31″W	3,402	1,037	3.5	5.6
Middle Creek (North Fork Cache Creek)	263504	North Fork Cache Creek	38°59′19″N 122°32′24″W	994	303	3.25	5.23
Middle Creek (Rodman Slough)	234282	Rodman Slough	39°08′54″N 122°54′45″W	1,329	405	8.5	13.7
Middle Fork Stony Creek	228603	Stony Creek	39°22′40″N 122°39′07″W	1,480	450		
Mill Creek (Big Canyon Creek)	228668	Big Canyon Creek	38°51′02″N 122°42′02″W	2,119	646	1.5	2.4
Mill Creek (Eel River)	228671	Eel River	39°23′05″N 123°06′55″W	1,496	456	4	6.4
Mill Creek (Salmon Creek)	263604	Salmon Creek	39°28′36″N 122°58′41″W	1,962	598	6.25	10.06
Molesworth Creek	228903	Clear Lake	38°56′17″N 122°38′09″W	1,332	406	2.5	4.0
Morrison Creek	263845	Clear Lake	39°05′45″N 122°48′15″W	1,325	404	2.25	3.62
North Fork Bartlett Creek	234368	Bartlett Creek	39°10′36″N 122°44′07″W	2,133	650	3	4.8
North Fork Cache Creek	234369	Cache Creek	38°58′52″N 122°30′12″W	945	288	36	58
North Fork Mill Creek	254984	Mill Creek	39°07′53″N 123°09′24″W	646	197	5	8.0
North Fork Wolf Creek	264221	Wolf Creek	39°07′35″N 122°38′49″W	2,080	630	3	4.8
Old Kelsey Creek	1766141	Clear Lake	39°01′10″N 122°48′16″W	1,325	404		
Packsaddle Creek	264441	Rice Fork	39°22′56″N 122°56′12″W	1,880	570	4	6.4
Palmer Creek	230267	Soda Creek	38°51′32″N 122°30′51″W	1,060	320	3	4.8
Panther Creek (Soda Creek)	264478	Soda Creek	39°26′21″N 122°59′08″W	1,837	560	5.25	8.45
Panther Creek (Willow Creek)	230298	Willow Creek	39°05′21″N 123°03′27″W	2,080	630	2.5	4.0
Parramore Creek	264534	Rice Fork	39°18′51″N 122°52′01″W	2,057	627	4.5	7.2
Perini Creek	230526	Seigler Canyon Creek	38°54′12″N 122°38′20″W	1,450	440	2	3.2
Perkins Creek	230529	North Fork Cache Creek	38°59′04″N 122°31′16″W	968	295	5	8.0
Phipps Creek	230602	North Fork Cache Creek	38°59′58″N 122°33′20″W	1,020	310	2.25	3.62
Poge Creek	234489	Alley Creek	39°11′01″N 122°53′34″W	1,368	417	3	4.8
Pool Creek	230926	Scotts Creek	39°05′27″N 122°57′56″W	1,440	440		
Pope Creek	234501	Putah Creek	38°37′22″N 122°15′56″W	443	135	17	27
Putah Creek	234522	Sacramento River	38.53006°N 121.7602°W	43	13		
Rattlesnake Creek (Eel River)	267161	Eel River	39°29′37″N 122°51′21″W	2,493	760	5.5	8.9
Rattlesnake Creek (North Fork Cache Creek)	265197	North Fork Cache Creek	39°14′41″N 122°48′22″W	2,323	708	2.5	4.0
Rice Creek	267179	Rice Fork	39°21′19″N 122°53′08″W	1,955	596	7.5	12.1
Rice Fork	267180	Lake Pillsbury	39°23′00″N 122°55′52″W	1,831	558		
Robinson Creek	234576	Rodman Slough	39°08′41″N 122°54′28″W	1,332	406	4	6.4
Rock Creek	265486	French Creek	39°17′07″N 122°50′15″W	2,218	676	4	6.4
Rocky Creek	231763	Cache Creek	38°58′46″N 122°28′35″W	919	280	8.5	13.7
Rodman Slough	267193	Clear Lake	39°07′35″N 122°53′55″W	1,325	404	2.5	4.0
Root Creek	265562	Wyman Creek	39°13′15″N 122°43′41″W	2,165	660	2.5	4.0
Rumsey Slough	232013	Clear Lake	39°01′26″N 122°53′26″W	1,329	405	1.5	2.4
Rush Creek	232020	Kelsey Creek	38°50′15″N 122°44′31″W	2,365	721	1	1.6
Saint Helena Creek	232162	Putah Creek	38°46′00″N 122°36′17″W	1,066	325	9	14
Saint Marys Creek	232215	Saint Helena Creek	38°43′27″N 122°36′52″W	1,184	361	2.5	4.0
Salmon Creek	232278	Lake Pillsbury	39°26′38″N 122°58′00″W	1,824	556	2.5	4.0
Salt Creek	265761	Rice Fork	39°17′20″N 122°49′12″W	2,277	694	3.25	5.23
Salt Flat Creek	234616	Middle Creek	39°13′36″N 122°56′31″W	1,444	440	2	3.2
Salt Glade Creek	265777	Rice Fork	39°20′55″N 122°53′21″W	1,959	597	1	1.6
Salt Spring Creek	232336	Lake Pillsbury	39°25′15″N 122°54′56″W	1,863	568	2.25	3.62
Sanhedrin Creek	232532	Elk Creek	39°36′43″N 123°05′52″W	1,322	403		
Schindler Creek	265909	Clear Lake	39°01′22″N 122°40′01″W	1,332	406		
Scotts Creek	234664	Rodman Slough	39°09′45″N 122°57′14″W	1,335	407	30	48
Seigler Canyon Creek	253836	Cache Creek	38°55′32″N 122°36′45″W	1,325	404	8	13
Skeleton Creek	266231	Eel River	39°26′07″N 122°51′24″W	2,064	629	3	4.8
Smokehouse Creek	267275	Lake Pillsbury	39°26′38″N 122°57′52″W	1,831	558	9	14
Soap Creek	267352	North Fork Cache Creek	39°11′57″N 122°42′34″W	1,890	580	2.5	4.0
Soda Creek (Eel River)	234825	Eel River	39°24′38″N 122°58′44″W	1,709	521	2.5	4.0
Soda Creek (Putah Creek)	253908	Putah Creek	38°47′46″N 122°29′17″W	778	237	10	16
South Fork Bartlett Creek	267423	Bartlett Creek	39°10′36″N 122°44′07″W	2,133	650	2.5	4.0
South Fork Dry Creek	234997	Dry Creek	38°43′47″N 122°39′59″W	1,302	397	2	3.2
South Fork Scotts Creek	235050	Scotts Creek	39°02′30″N 122°58′57″W	1,483	452	7	11
South Fork Valley Creek	267473	Long Valley Creek	39°06′06″N 122°41′41″W	1,332	406	5	8.0
South Fork Wolf Creek	267520	Wolf Creek	39°07′35″N 122°38′49″W	2,080	630	3	4.8
Spanish Creek	267546	North Fork Cache Creek	39°10′10″N 122°36′54″W	1,529	466	1.5	2.4
Spikenard Creek	235198	Big Canyon Creek	38°50′59″N 122°40′31″W	1,640	500	2	3.2
Squaw Valley Creek	235326	Lake Pillsbury	39°26′12″N 122°56′06″W	1,824	556	3.25	5.23
Stanton Creek	267675	North Fork Cache Creek	39°09′58″N 122°32′14″W	1,473	449	5.5	8.9
Sulphur Creek	235710	Kelsey Creek	38°51′22″N 122°45′45″W	2,277	694	2	3.2
Sulphur Springs Creek	235736	Elk Creek	39°33′27″N 123°01′56″W	1,785	544	4.5	7.2
Sweet Hollow Creek	268022	North Fork Cache Creek	39°01′06″N 122°33′59″W	1,040	320		
Sweet Springs Creek	235890	Copsey Creek	38°51′22″N 122°38′02″W	1,539	469	1.25	2.01
Sweetwater Creek	235896	Kelsey Creek	38°54′19″N 122°51′10″W	1,535	468	4.25	6.84
Thistle Glade Creek	268225	Eel River	39°23′46″N 122°52′52″W	1,847	563	5.5	8.9
Thompson Creek (Manning Creek)	236266	Manning Creek	39°00′24″N 122°53′48″W	1,345	410	2.5	4.0
Thompson Creek (Rumsey Slough)	236260	Rumsey Slough	39°01′07″N 122°53′35″W	1,332	406	1.25	2.01
Thurston Creek	236332	Thurston Lake	38°56′09″N 122°41′34″W	1,440	440	9	14
Trout Creek (Cache Creek)	236564	Cache Creek	38°57′03″N 122°27′16″W	938	286	2	3.2
Trout Creek (Eel River)	268433	Eel River	39°32′18″N 122°51′32″W	2,782	848	4	6.4
Troutdale Creek	236573	Saint Helena Creek	38°40′01″N 122°35′19″W	1,598	487	2.5	4.0
win Valley Creek	255173	North Fork Cache Creek	39°13′17″N 122°44′04″W	1,995	608	5.25	8.45
Vasser Creek	237036	Coleman Creek	38°56′30″N 123°02′40″W	801	244	5	8.0
Welch Creek	268847	Soda Creek	39°26′21″N 122°59′08″W	1,837	560	3	4.8
Wescott Creek	268857	Corbin Creek	39°33′18″N 122°46′03″W	3,054	931		
West Fork Middle Creek	268908	Middle Creek	39°15′04″N 122°57′04″W	1,480	450	6.5	10.5
West Fork Spanish Creek	268917	Spanish Creek	39°11′16″N 122°36′41″W	1,699	518	3	4.8
Widow Creek	237728	Kelsey Creek	38°54′30″N 122°51′28″W	1,526	465	1.5	2.4
Wild Bill Creek	269072	North Fork Cache Creek	39°14′07″N 122°46′46″W	2,208	673	2.25	3.62
Wildhorse Creek	237815	Squaw Creek	38°50′21″N 122°50′31″W	1,552	473	2.25	3.62
Wilkinson Creek	237832	Saint Helena Creek	38°42′52″N 122°36′36″W	1,220	370	2	3.2
Willow Creek (Rive Fork)	269147	Rice Fork	39°22′37″N 122°55′02″W	1,850	560	5	8.0
Willow Creek (Scotts Creek)	237881	Scotts Creek	39°06′09″N 123°02′35″W	1,827	557	4	6.4
Wolf Creek	269265	North Fork Cache Creek	39°04′09″N 122°35′01″W	1,129	344	5.5	8.9
Wyman Creek	269324	North Fork Cache Creek	39°13′06″N 122°43′53″W	2,001	610	2.5	4.0

== Notes on source ==
Unless otherwise stated, the information above is derived from an extract from the GNIS database of features of class "stream" in Lake County, California. Some anomalies have been corrected:

- Rodman Slough is classed "swamp" but is included here since almost half the inflow to Clear Lake comes through the slough.
- Cache Creek is classed "canal", perhaps true lower down, and is also included here
- Putah Creek is classed "lake" for some reason, but is included here
- GNIS says that Pieta Creek (230640) is an 11 mile long tributary of Coleman Creek, while Coleman Creek (221365) is an 8 mile long tributary of Pieta Creek. In fact, the map shows that Coleman Creek joins Pieta Creek shortly before the combined stream enters the Russian River.
- Herman Creek is described as a tributary of Dry Lake, which should read Dry Creek.
- The features named Burns Valley, Donovan Valley, Eightmile Valley, Forty Springs Valley, Lyons Valley, Riley Valley and Twin Valley have been omitted, since they are valleys rather than streams.
- Some streams have part of their watershed in Lake County, but not their main course. They have been included for the sake of completeness.
- Two features named Dutch Oven Creek were found, both tributaries of Corbin Creek. They have been named Dutch Oven Creek E and Dutch Oven Creek W. (Note: There must be a story behind the two Dutch Oven Creeks. A July 2009 report on steelhead / rainbow trout resources of the Eel River watershed prepared for the California State Coastal Conservancy noted that there were two and described them both. The first has a stream length of about 2.3 miles (3.7 km) and enters Corbin Creek from the south about 3.8 miles (6.1 km) upstream from the Eel River confluence. The second has a stream length of about 2.6 miles (4.2 km) and enters Corbin Creek from the south about 7.9 miles (12.7 km) upstream from the Eel River confluence.)
- Otherwise, where two different creeks have the same name, their parent name has been added in parentheses. Thus Willow Creek (Scotts Creek) is a tributary of Scotts Creek
- With Manning Creek (228024) the GNIS entry states correctly that it flows into Clear Lake, but gives a mouth location some distance from the lake and gives a mouth elevation of 1,378 feet, while the Clear Lake (258441) elevation is given as 1,325 feet. Other tributaries of Clear Lake such as Molesworth Creek (228903) are given mouth elevations of up to 1,332 feet.
- It seems plausible that elevations in GNIS are estimated from distance to the nearest higher and lower contour lines. This would result in points at the base and the top of a cliff being given elevations that are too high or too low.

== Sources ==
- Becker, G.S.; Reining, I.J. (2009), Steelhead/rainbow trout (Oncorhynchus mykiss) resources of the Eel River watershed, California. (PDF), Cartography by D.A. Asbury, Oakland, CA.: Center for Ecosystem Management and Restoration
- Hittell, John Shertzer (1882), Bancroft's Pacific Coast Guide Book, A.L. Bancroft & Company
- Lake County Water Inventory and Analysis (PDF), Lake County Watershed Protection District, March 2006, p. figure 2-1, archived from the original (PDF) on 2021-05-04 This article incorporates text from this source, which is in the public domain.
- Lundquist, Erica (February 2010), Scotts Creek Watershed Assessment (PDF), Scotts Creek Watershed Council, archived from the original (PDF) on 2021-05-11
- Lundquist, Erica (February 2010b), Middle Creek Watershed Assessment (PDF), Middle Creek Coordinated Resource Management and Planning Group, archived from the original (PDF) on 2021-05-17
