= Allen Springs, California =

Allen Springs
- Mineral springs
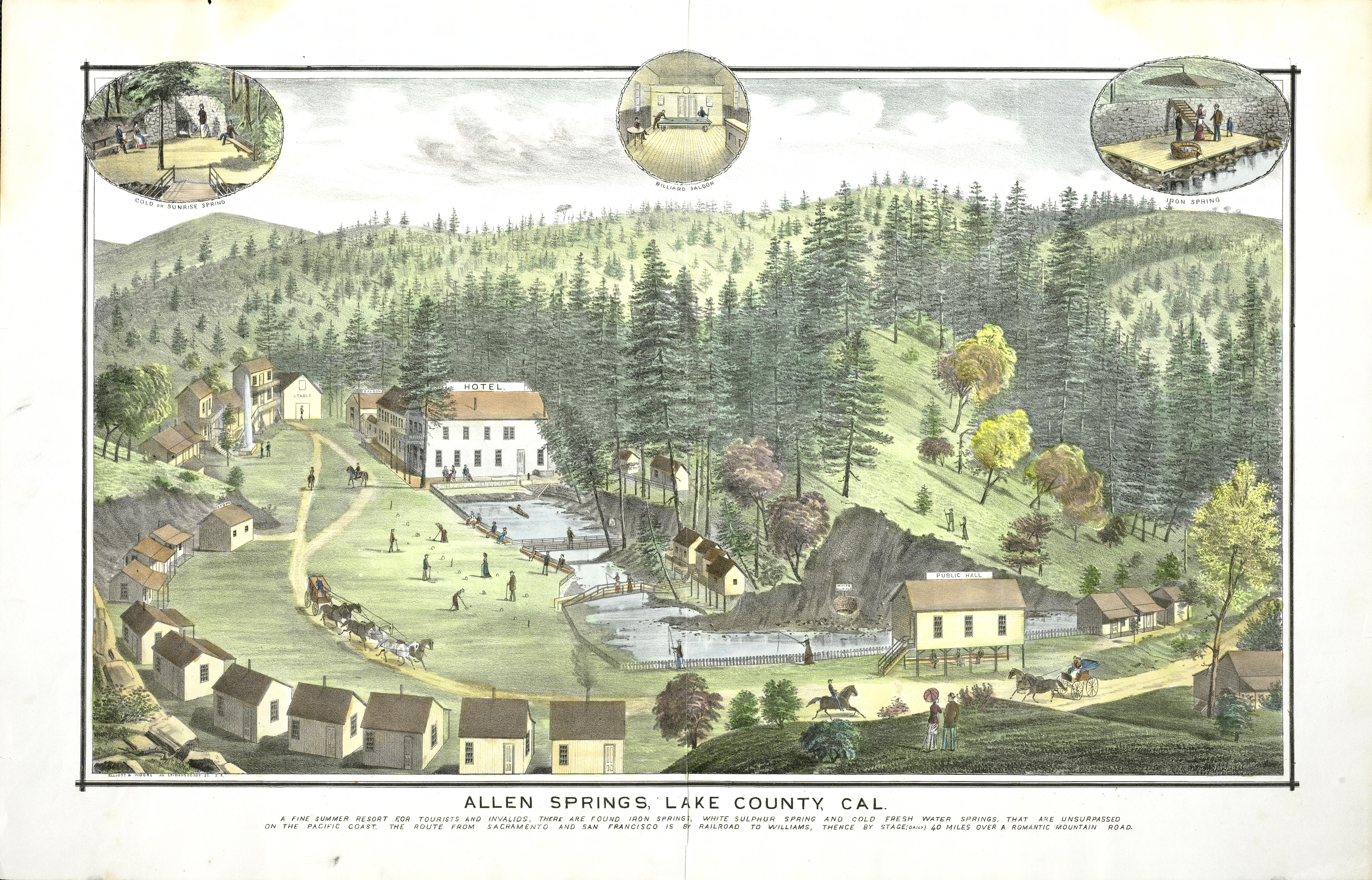
- The resort in 1880

- Location in California Allen Springs (the United States)
- Coordinates: 39.1596699°N 122.6646874°W
- Country: United States
- State: California
- County: Lake County
- Elevation: 1,926 ft (587 m)

Allen Springs is a group of mineral water springs in Lake County, California. From 1874 the springs were surrounded by a resort with a hotel, cottages, saloon, store and so on. The resort was turned into a private club in 1912 and was abandoned by 1940. By 2021 the site had returned to nature.

== Location ==
The Allen springs are in the Bartlett Creek (Note: Waring (1915) says the springs are in the Allen Creek canyon rather than the Bartlett Creek canyon, but otherwise describes a location that agrees with Hamilton (1915) and mindat. Another account said the resort was on the south fork of Cache Creek. The coordinates given by mindat are about 4 miles west of Hough Springs, as stated by Waring, and about 3 miles downstream from Barllett Springs as stated by Hamilton. They are labelled "Allen Springs" by Bing and Google maps. Modern maps name the creek Bartlett Creek, a tributary of North Fork Cache Creek.) canyon 3 miles (4.8 km) below Bartlett Springs on the road between Williams and Bartlett Springs. They are about 4 miles (6.4 km) west of Hough Springs. The springs are at an elevation of 587 metres (1,926 ft). The Köppen climate classification is Csb : Warm-summer Mediterranean climate.

== Springs ==
There are many strong springs in the bed and side of the creek. Gas bubbles up through the waters of the creek along a stretch 200 to 300 feet (61 to 91 m) long.

A 1911 report said a group containing three or four principal springs and several smaller springs was on the edge of the creek about 250 yards (230 m) northwest of the hotel. Among these the Chalybeate Spring was enclosed in a cement basin and gave about 5 US gallons (19 L; 4.2 imp gal) per minute of carbonated water at a temperature of 63 °F (17 °C). The water was alkaline and was turbid from iron in suspension. Across the creek from the Chalybeate spring, about 20 yards (18 m) to the east, a sulfur spring gave about 1.5 US gallons (5.7 L; 1.2 imp gal) per minute of slightly carbonated and distinctly sulphurated water with a temperature of 56 °F (13 °C). The Sureshot spring 150 yards (140 m) upstream at the edge of the creek was the westernmost of the improved springs and the most strongly mineralized.

A 1914 description gave different names to the springs. It listed the main springs and their temperatures as White Sulphur, 57 °F (14 °C); Soda, 60 °F (16 °C); Soda and Iron (three springs) 63 °F (17 °C); and Allen (at the club house), 56 °F (13 °C).

== History ==
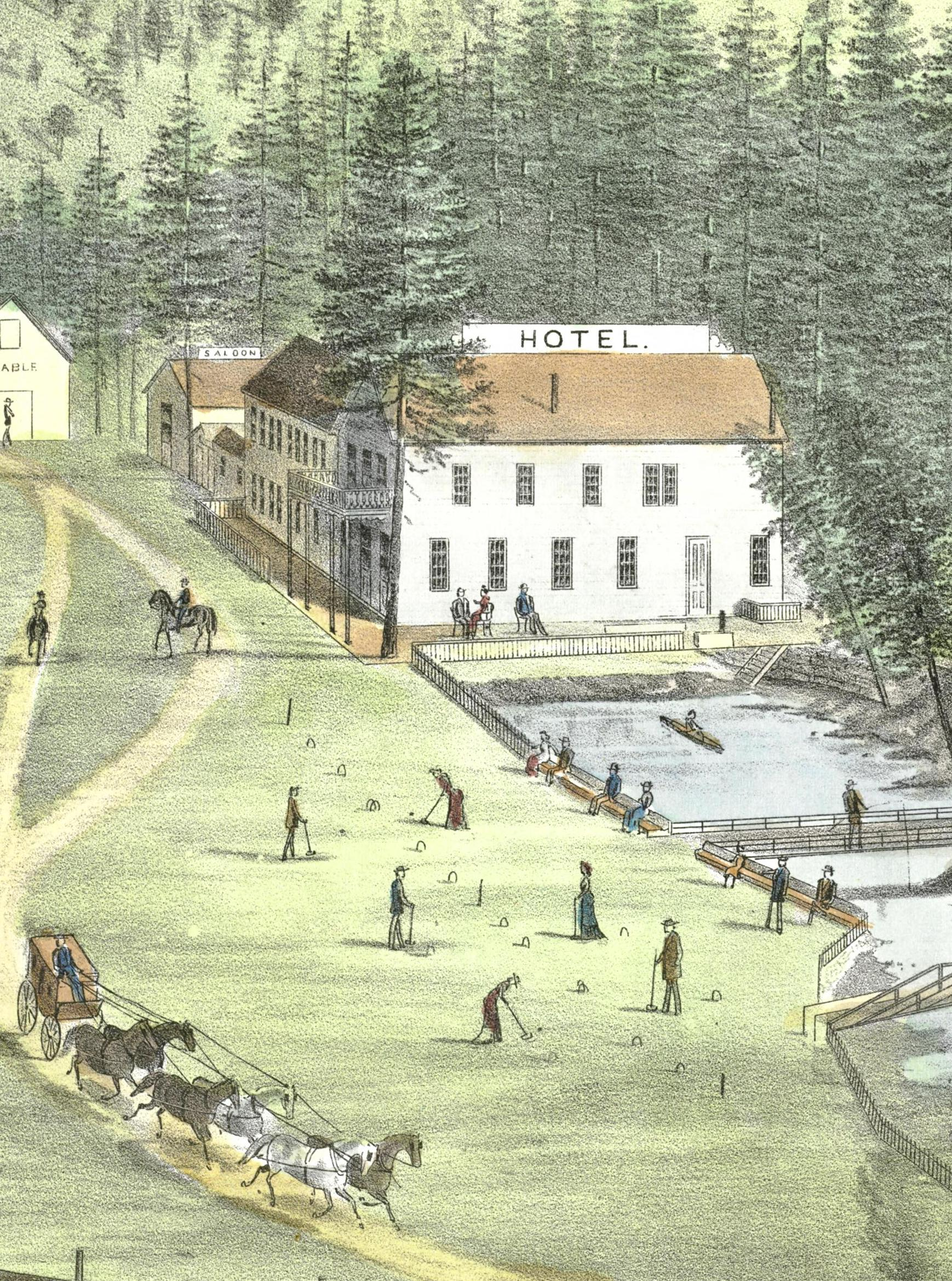
Hotel at Allen Springs in 1880 with croquet pitch in the foreground

The springs were discovered by Europeans in 1871. They were first acquired by a Mr. Allen. A resort was founded in 1874. The Allen Springs Post Office operated from 1874 to 1906. The resort grew to include a hotel, cottages, dance hall, store, stable and other facilities. An 1877 report in the Weekly Colusa Sun, said,

After searching for many weeks, I have at length landed at the ne plus ultra of all watering places. As a summer resort, Allen Springs are far ahead of any place that I have ever visited. Here we have the cool bracing sea breeze; gorgeous mountain scenery; a stream of fresh, cool water running past our very door-steps, under the cooling shades of tall pines and firs. The surrounding forests are fairly alive with all kinds of game, such as deer, rabbits, squirrels, grouse, quail, etc. There are plenty of speckled trout yet, in the stream, although we have a surfeit of them every day. The springs, of which we have four, emiting [sic] mineral water of different kinds, are unequaled for the cure of paralysis, rheumatism, dropsy, gout and kindred diseases.

The buildings of the town, or springs, consist of a fine, largo hotel, conducted by the Allen Brothers; also thirty-four cottages, which are rented to guests at a reasonable rate; a stable under the management of the Lee Brothers; a neat cigar, liquor and billiard saloon, owned by Seube & Ällen; Mr.Pryot's store of general merchandise; a barber shop and bath rooms, and a town hall. There are now about one hundred and forty invalids and pleasure-seekers in our town. Our chief amusements are croquet, chess, billiards, hunting and fishing. The mail facilities are very good now. Stages arrive daily from Colusa at 4 p.m., and depart at 5 a.m. The organization of a school is spoken of. We had a Sabbath School last Sabbath, with a fair attendance. We had a splendid shower yesterday, and farmers (?) were fearful of a flood.

An advertisement from 1880 described Allen Springs as "A fine summer resort for tourists and invalids. There are found iron springs, white sulphur spring and cold fresh water springs that are unsurpassed on the Pacific coast. The route from Sacramento and San Francisco is by railroad to Williams, thence by stage (daily) 40 miles over a romantic mountain road." Water from the Allen spring was bottled for sale.

James D. Bailey bought the springs in January 1881. As of 1881 there was a daily line of stages from Lakeport to the west via Upper Lake, and from Williams to the east. There were 21 guest cottages. The hotel was two stories high and 112 feet (34 m) wide. There was also a large dancing hall. The water was claimed to be good for kidney affections, dyspepsia, rheumatism, dropsy, general debility, skin diseases, female complaints, ague, paralysis and erysipelas. The hotel contained facilities for mail, express delivery and telegrams.

Early in the 20th century high waters one winter washed away some of the cottages and the resort was closed. It was reopened in the summer of 1910 with the hotel building and several cottages. As of 1911 water that was formerly bottled, which came from a spring on the steep canyon side opposite the hotel, was piped across the creek to a drinking shed. As of 1914 four or five of the springs had cemented curbs. The springs, which had formerly been a resort, were operated by the private Allen Springs Club of Woodland for exclusive use of members and guests. (Note: The Allen Springs Club was incorporated on 19 March 1912.)

The resort had been abandoned by 1940. A real estate advertisement in 2021 for part of the resort said "Creek is running & nature has taken over".

== Sources ==
- 160 acres in Lake County, California, Lands of America, a CoStar company
- "Allen Springs", Geographic Names Information System, United States Geological Survey, United States Department of the Interior, 19 January 1981
- "Allen Springs Club", opencorporates
- "Allen Springs, Lake County, California, United States", mindat
- Allen Springs, Lake County, Cal, Allen Springs, 1880
- "Allen Springs Post Office", Geographic Names Information System, United States Geological Survey, United States Department of the Interior, 26 November 1997
- Crabtree, Anita (2020), "The Towns and Post Offices of Lake County", The USGenWeb Project, Lake County Coordinator
- Hamilton, Fletcher (July 1915), "Report of State Mineralogist, 1913-1914", Appendix to the Journals of the Senate and Assembly of the forty-second session of the Legislature of the State of California, vol. VII
- Major Dux (28 June 1877), "Allen Springs", Weekly Colusa Sun, XVI (26), Allen Springs
- Palmer, Lyman L; Wallace, W. F; Wells, Harry Laurenz; Kanaga, Tillie (1881), History of Napa and Lake Counties, California : comprising their geography, geology, topography, climatography, springs and timber, together with a full and particular record of the Mexican Grants, also separate histories of all the townships and biographical sketches, San Francisco, Calif.: Slocum, Bowen
- Waring, Gerald Ashley (1915). Springs of California. U.S. Geological Survey Water Supply Paper. Vol. 338. U.S. Government Printing Office. doi:10.3133/wsp338.
