= Bartlett School =

Bartlett School may refer to:

- Academy at Palumbo, historic school building in Philadelphia, Pennsylvania, formerly known as Bartlett School
- The Bartlett, the Faculty of the Built Environment at University College London
  - Bartlett School of Architecture
  - Bartlett School of Planning
  - Bartlett School of Construction and Project Management

== See also ==
- Bartlett (disambiguation)
- Bartlett High School (disambiguation)
