= Bartlett High School =

Bartlett High School may refer to:

- Bartlett High School (Alaska)
- Bartlett High School (Illinois)
- Bartlett High School (Massachusetts), a school in Webster, Massachusetts
- Bartlett High School (Tennessee)
- Bartlett High School (Texas)
- Bartlett High School (Connecticut) (1855–1873)

== See also ==
- Bartlett School (disambiguation)
