= Big Canyon Creek (Lake County) =

River in California, United States

- Location within California Location within the United States

Physical characteristics
- Source
  - coordinates: 38.8579579°N 122.7311008°W
- Mouth: Putah Creek
  - coordinates: 38.806144°N 122.615064°W
  - elevation: 1,040 feet (320 m)
- Length: 8 miles (13 km)

Big Canyon Creek is a creek in Lake County, California. It is a tributary of Putah Creek.

== Hydrology ==
Big Canyon Creek is an 8 miles (13 km) long tributary of Putah Creek. Its mouth is at an elevation of 1,040 feet (320 m). Big Canyon Creek supplies rainfall to the Putah Creek drainage with very little snowmelt or base flow. It does not contain any reservoirs to provide surface storage and regulate flows. In 1912 Warden R. L. Sinkey wrote of Putah Creek, "Becomes dry anywhere below Winters during the summer months. Putah Creek is just a small stream in the summertime. St. Helena Creek, Anderson Creek, Dry Creek run just small streams. Big Canyon Creek runs more water, I think, than all the rest".

== Location ==
The Köppen climate classification is Csb : Warm-summer Mediterranean climate.

Boggs Mountain is an elongated rolling highland. It forms a topographical divide separating Big Canyon Creek to the east from Kelsey Creek to the west. Adams Springs is beside the creek, near its head. William Robert Prather, who developed Adams Springs, corresponded with Thomas Edison in the late 1890s, who told him how to build a Pelton wheel in Big Canyon Creek to generate electricity for the resort.

Big Canyon Road (107) runs along the lower part of the creek. There is a 24.6 feet (7.5 m) steel bridge that carries the road across the creek below the point where it is joined by Bad Creek. It was built in 1930 and reconstructed in 1993. As of November 2017 it was in poor condition and its structure had been appraised as "basically intolerable requiring high priority of replacement".

== Tributaries ==
Stream	GNIS id	Parent	Mouth			Length	
Stream	GNIS id	Parent	Coords	Elev ft	Elev m	mi	km
Big Canyon Creek	219152	Putah Creek	38°48′22″N 122°36′52″W	1,040	320	8	13
←Mill Creek (Big Canyon Creek)	228668	Big Canyon Creek	38°51′02″N 122°42′02″W	2,119	646	1.5	2.4
←Spikenard Creek	235198	Big Canyon Creek	38°50′59″N 122°40′31″W	1,640	500	2	3.2
←Bad Creek	218510	Big Canyon Creek	38°50′55″N 122°40′00″W	1,568	478	1	1.6
←Malo Creek	227987	Big Canyon Creek	38°49′54″N 122°38′41″W	1,270	390	2	3.2

== See also ==
- Rivers of Lake County, California

== Sources ==
- "Adams, California", Geographic Names Information System, United States Geological Survey, United States Department of the Interior, 19 January 1981
- Baughn, James (November 2017), "Big Canyon Road over Big Canyon Creek", Bridgereports.com
- "Big Canyon Creek, Lake County, California, United States", Mindat
- "Big Canyon Creek", Geographic Names Information System, United States Geological Survey, United States Department of the Interior, 19 January 1981
- Draft Environmental Impact Report for Geothermal Exploration Permit, Boggs Mountain State Forest, Lake County, Ca, The Commission, 1976
- Lake County Planning Department (May 1989), Cobb Mountain Area Plan (PDF) (Preliminary Draft), archived from the original (PDF) on 2021-04-23
- Lake County Water Inventory and Analysis (PDF), CDM, March 2006, archived from the original (PDF) on 2021-05-04
- Shapovalov, Leo (April 1947), "Report on Fisheries Resources in Connection With the Proposed Yolo-Solano Development of the United States Bureau of Reclamation" (PDF), California Fish and Game, 38 (2), San Francisco: State of California, Department of Natural Resources
- Wakefield, David (2 October 2020), "The Springs That Made Lake County Famous: Adams Springs", The Lake County Bloom
