= Seigler Canyon Creek =

- Location within California Location within the United States

Physical characteristics
- Mouth
  - coordinates: 38°53′42.7″N 122°39′23.0″W
- Length: 7.5 miles (12.1 km)

Seigler Canyon Creek (also known as Siegler Creek and Sigler Creek) is creek in Lake County, California.

== Course ==
The creek is 7.5 miles (12.1 km) long. It flows east-northeast until it reaches Cache Creek 1 mile north of Lower Lake. The creek runs through Seigler Canyon, which is about 3 miles (4.8 km) long, with its head about 0.6 miles (0.97 km) east of Seigler Springs, a village, and its mouth about 1.5 miles (2.4 km) west of the village of Lower Lake.

== Fish ==
Endemic species include the hitch (Lavinia exilicauda), which were regularly caught in Seigler Canyon Creek by the local Elem Indian Colony.

== See also ==
- Rivers of Lake County, California

== Sources ==
- US Board on Geographic Names (1962), Decisions on Names in the United States, Department of the Interior
