= Rice Fork =

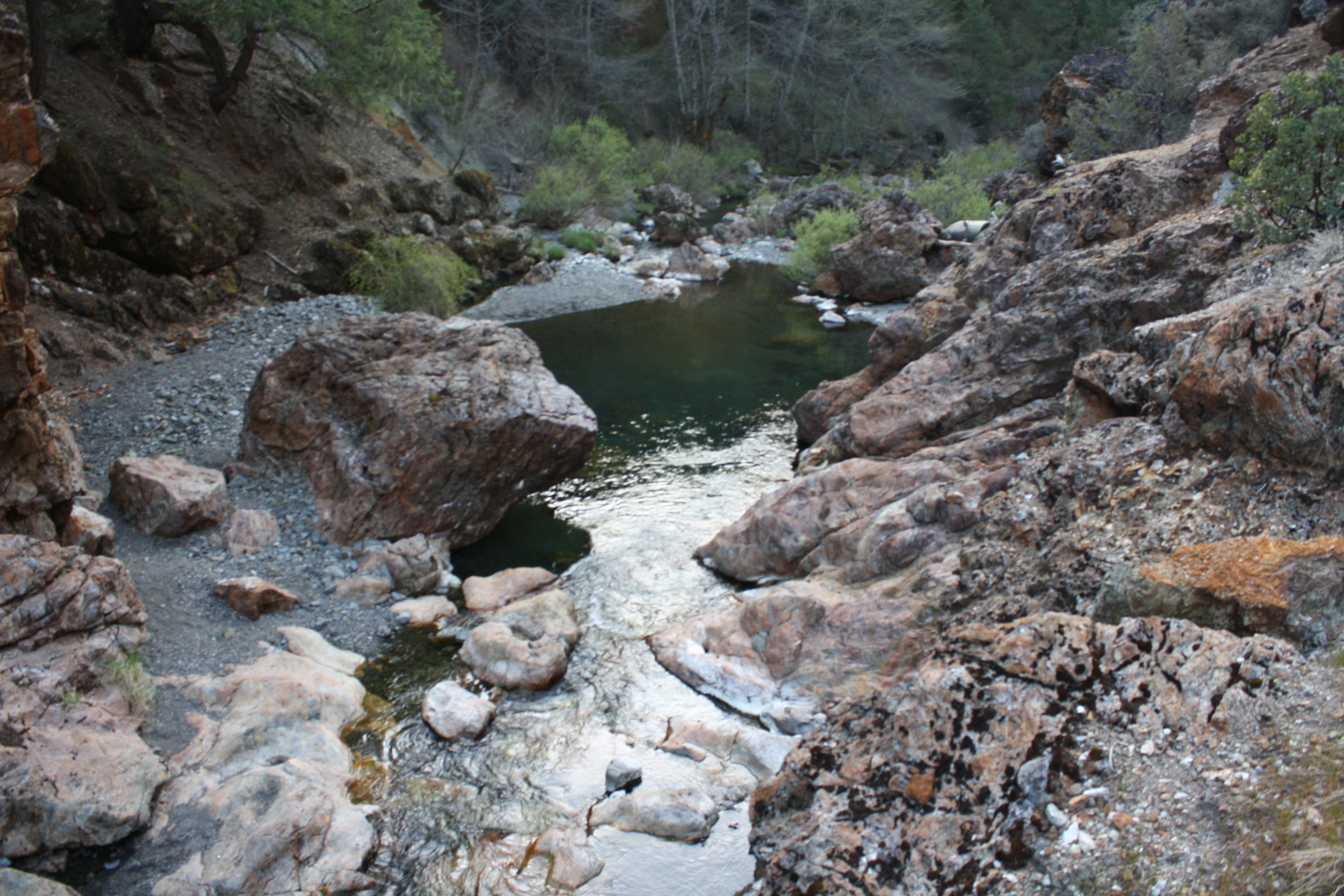
- Rice Fork at Crabtree Hot Springs

- Location in California
- Coordinates: 39°17′23.59″N 122°49′19.98″W
- Country: United States
- State: California
- County: Lake County
- Elevation: 2,257 ft (688 m)

The Rice Fork is a 22.7-mile-long (36.5 km) tributary of the Eel River in Lake County, California. The Rice Fork begins on the upper northwest side of Goat Mountain, on the Colusa-Lake County line, at an elevation of over 6,000 feet (1,800 m). It quickly descends the steep western slope of the mountain, then bends northward, and flows northwesterly down a narrow winding steep walled canyon for about 18 miles (29 km), crossing two forest roads and adding many tributaries, ending its journey at the southern tip of Lake Pillsbury, at a varied elevation around 1,800 feet (550 m), depending on the lake level. Before the construction of Scott Dam in the 1920s, which formed Lake Pillsbury, the Rice Fork ran directly into the Eel River. It is one of Lake County's longest streams.

The many tributaries to Rice Fork are Salt Creek, French Creek, Parramore Creek, Bevans Creek, Bear Creek, Packsaddle Creek, Willow Creek, Deer Creek, Rice Creek, and Soda Creek.

== History ==
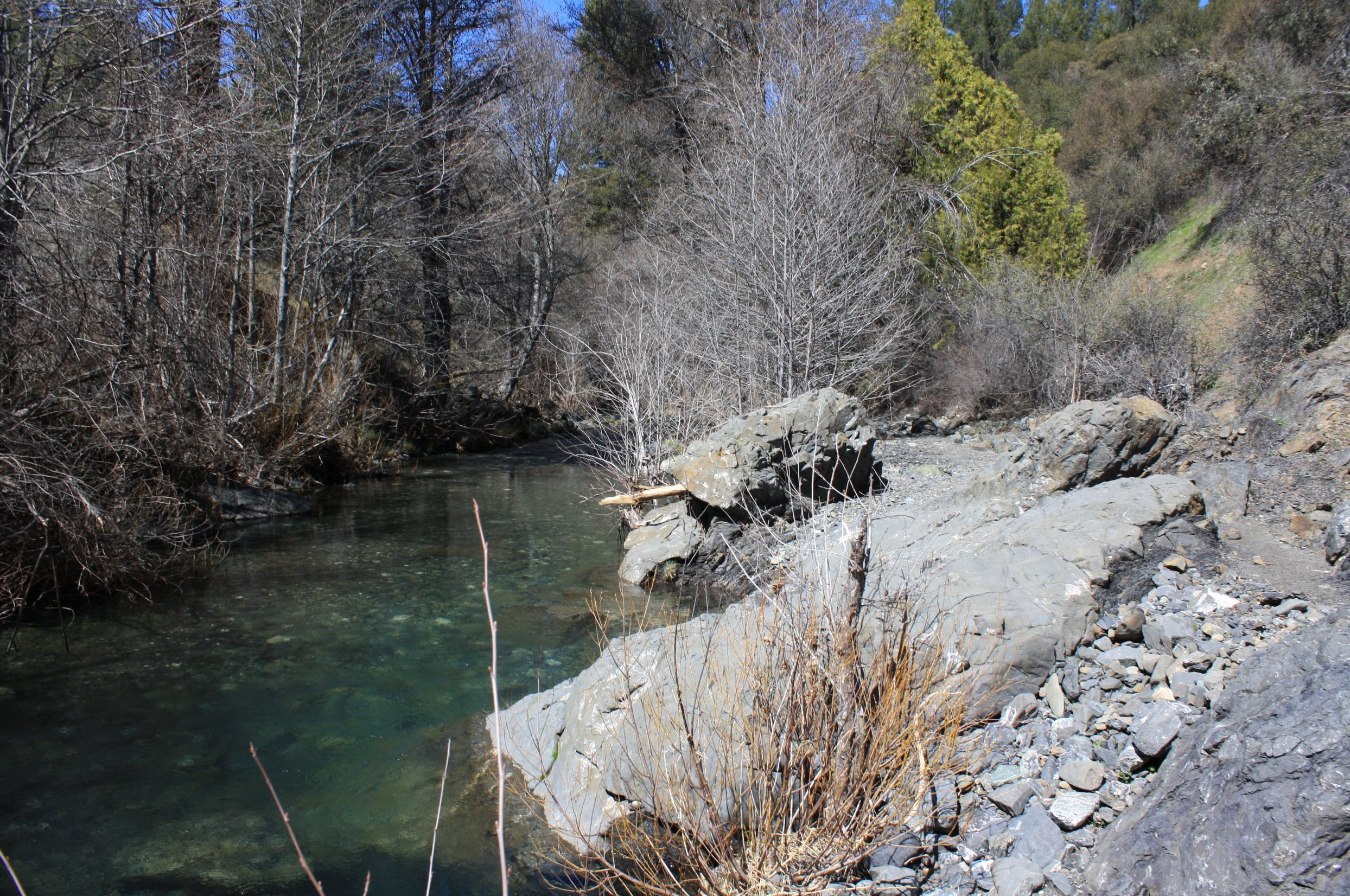
Rice Fork at Crabtree Hot Springs trailhead

In the 1860s, there was a very dry year in the Sacramento Valley. A man by the name of Rice and some neighbors brought horses and mules up to Rice Valley, and used it and adjoining territory for the fine pasture. Rice Valley was their headquarters. Rice was active in that area for only a few years, but Rice Valley, Rice Creek, and the Rice Fork took his name.

At one time, an Indian trail went from the hot springs down the Rice Fork canyon to the mouth of the river where it entered Gravelly Valley, then crossed the river at the upper end of the valley, then went up Squaw Valley Creek to the north of Big Squaw Valley and over the ridge to the Indian village at Bloody Rock. A portion of this trail is now under Lake Pillsbury.

== Watershed ==
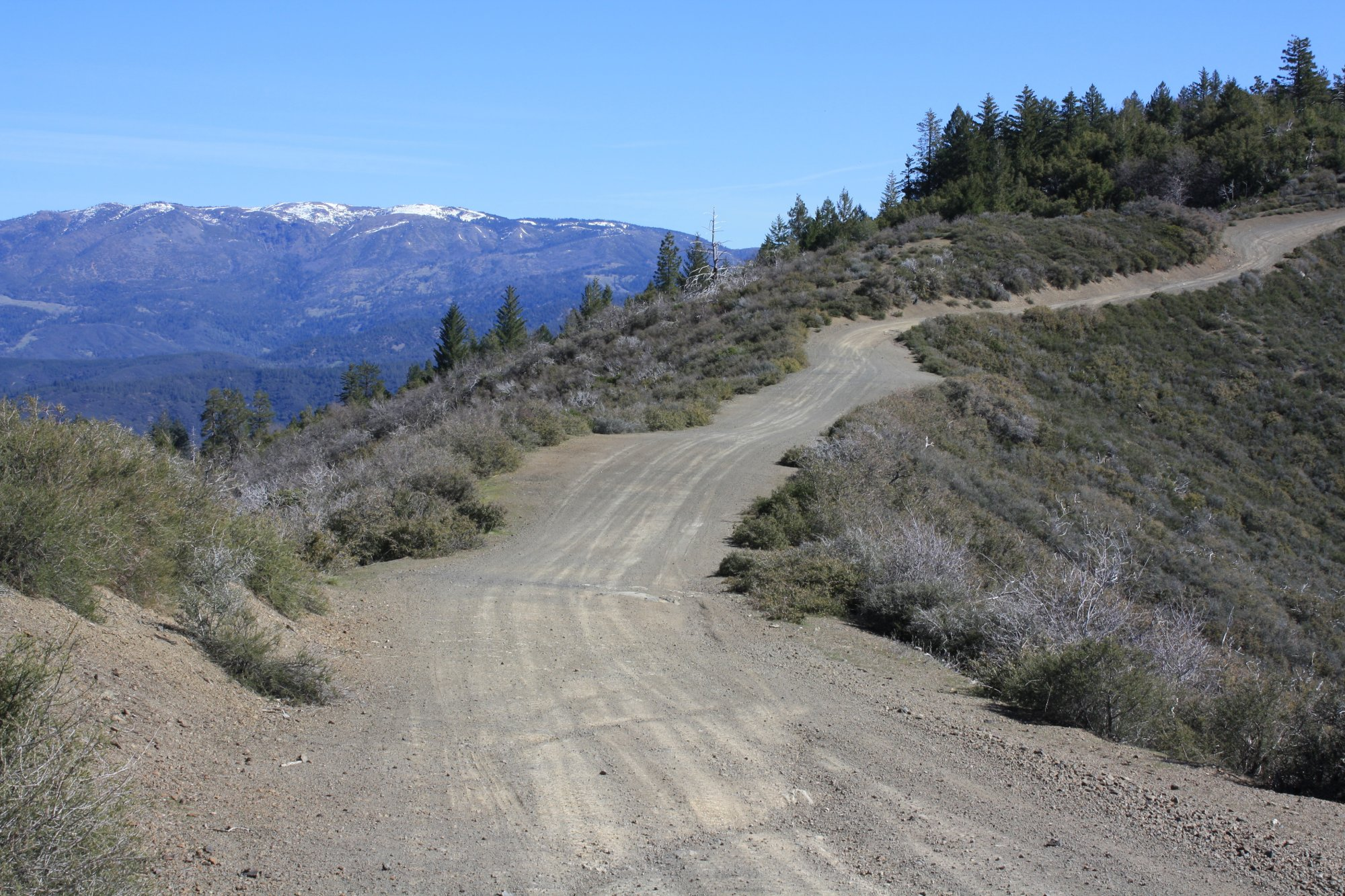
Snow Mountain from French Ridge

Snow Mountain-West at 7,038 feet (2,145 m) dominates the landscape on the east side of the Rice Fork watershed. Its massive west ridge drops down to Lake Pillsbury and divides the Rice Fork from the Eel River watershed, and its southern ridge connects with 6,121-foot (1,866 m) Goat Mountain about 9 miles (14 km) southeasterly to separate Rice Fork from the South Fork Stony Creek (Sacramento River) waters.

To the west of Snow Mountain-West, the ridges of 4,057-foot (1,237 m) Pine Mountain, 4,688-foot (1,429 m) Horse Mountain, and 4,191-foot (1,277 m) Elk Mountain connect to form the western boundary of Rice Fork's watershed, while French Ridge joins with 3,420-foot (1,040 m) Little Horse Mountain and the west ridge of Goat Mountain to define the southern limit, with all the waters flowing into Lake Pillsbury, the Eel River and on to the Pacific Ocean.

The average slope of Rice Fork is 200 feet per mile (38 m/km), and 2,110 feet per mile (400 m/km) between 4,000 feet (1,200 m) and 5,000 feet (1,500 m) elevation. The Rice Fork drains 33 percent of the total drainage area of Lake Pillsbury, and may contribute a like percentage of the amount of inflow. The Rice Fork arm contains 7 percent of the surface area and 6 percent of the total volume of the reservoir. Most of the sediment in Lake Pillsbury is deposited in the upper reaches of the Eel River and Rice Fork arms.

== Hale Ridge Research Natural Area (RNA) ==
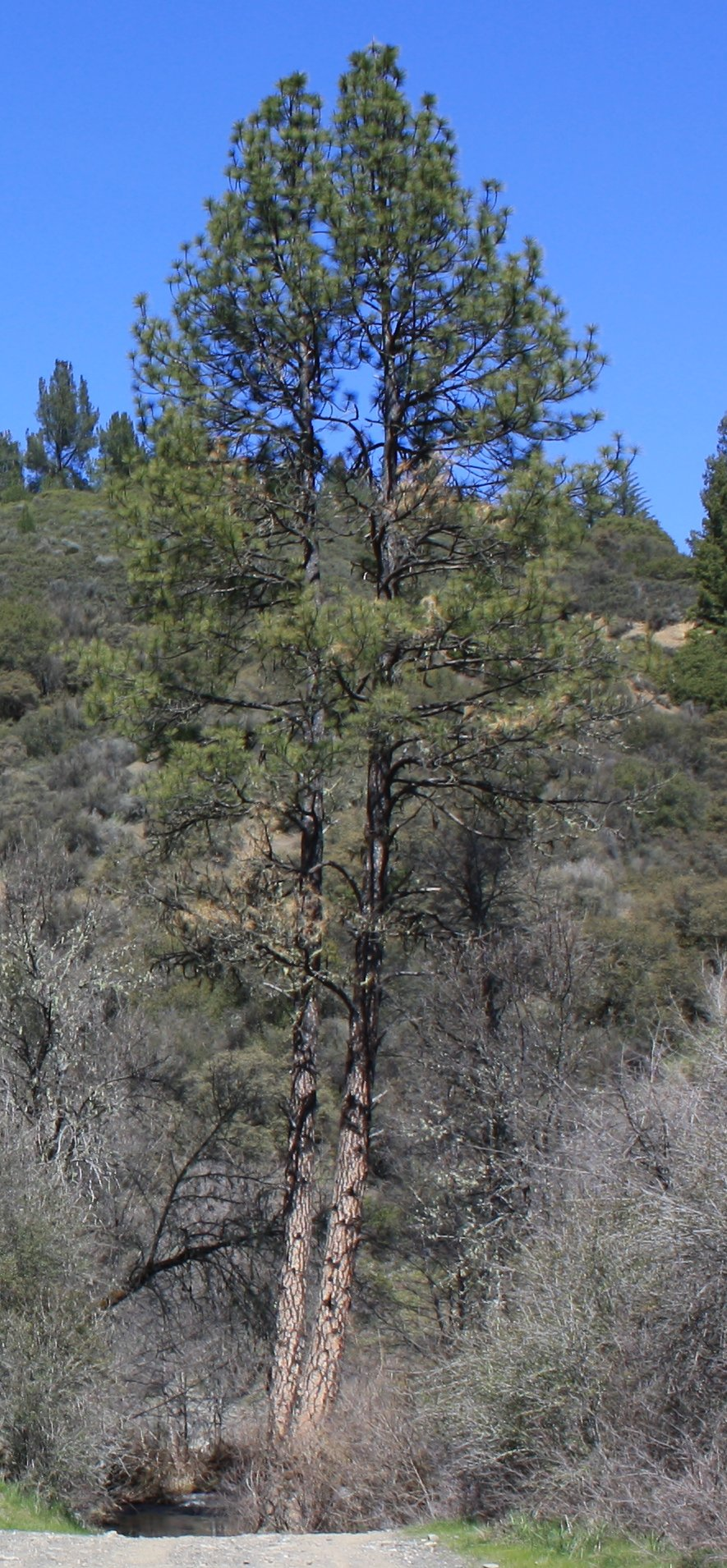
Knobcone pine at Rice Fork & Salt Creek crossing of Twin Valley Road

Rice Fork defines the southern boundary of the 975-acre (395 ha) Hale Ridge Research Natural Area (RNA), and parallels the east side of Forest Road 17N04 (Twin Valley Road), as it flows along the western boundary of the RNA for about one mile. A designated critical habitat for the federally protected northern spotted owl, and a winter range for black-tailed deer, the RNA was established by the U.S. Forest Service in 1987 to represent the knobcone pine forest for the North Coast Ranges. Within the RNA, dense stands of knobcone pine and mixed conifer forest, dominated by Douglas-fir, also provides a dispersal habitat for a Forest Service-listed sensitive species, the northern goshawk.

The underlying rocks of the RNA are all greywacke sandstones and shales. The greywacke has a muddy, brownish-gray sandstone appearance, ranging from rather soft and crumbly in weathered outcrops to solid rocks and boulders in the stream bed of the Rice Fork.

Some recreationists use Crabtree Hot Springs which is adjacent to the northwestern boundary of the RNA. The Rice Fork is also lightly used for recreation, but entry into the RNA is minimal. There is an unknown increase in risk of wildfire due to human use at the hot springs.

== Tributaries ==
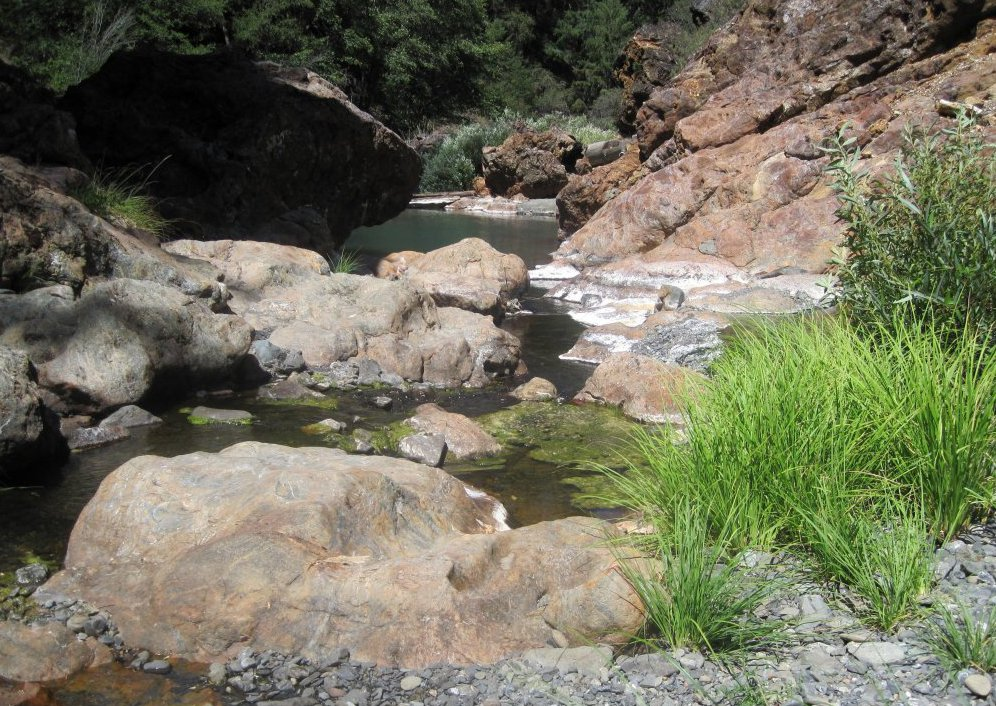
Rice Fork at Crabtree Hot Springs

Salt Creek is one of the larger tributaries, and flows from Fir Root Spring. Beginning at about 4,400 feet (1,300 m) above sea level, on the west slope of Goat Mountain's northwest ridge, it travels southwesterly down a steep canyon for about 3.4 miles (5.5 km), going over a 25-foot-high (7.6 m) falls and crossing a forest road, entering Rice Fork on the right at around 2,300 feet (700 m), about 11.9 miles (19.2 km) upstream from the lake, and around a quarter mile upstream from Crabtree Hot Springs.

French Creek begins at about 3,800 feet (1,200 m) above sea level near the top of French Ridge, and flows north down a steep canyon for about 3.9 miles (6.3 km), adding its tributary, entering Rice Fork on the left at around 2,200 feet (670 m), about 10.9 miles (17.5 km) upstream from the lake, and about a mile downstream from Crabtree Hot Springs. Rock Creek (tributary to French Creek) begins at about 3,600 feet (1,100 m) on Elk Mountain and flows northeasterly for about 3.6 miles (5.8 km) down a steep canyon, entering French Creek on the left about 0.4 miles (0.64 km) upstream from its confluence with Rice Fork.

Soda Creek begins at about 3,800 feet (1,200 m) on Elk Mountain and flows east down a steep canyon, entering Rice Fork on the left a short distance upstream from Parramore Creek, as indicated on the USFS 2008 map.

Parramore Creek begins at about 3,800 feet (1,200 m) on Elk Mountain and flows east for about 4.6 miles (7.4 km) down a steep canyon, crossing a forest road at Three Crossings, entering Rice Fork on the left about 8.1 miles (13.0 km) upstream from the lake.

Bear Creek flows from a spring at about 6,500 feet (2,000 m) on the southwest side of Snow Mountain-West. It drops rapidly down a steep canyon and flows southwesterly for about 9.1 miles (14.6 km), adding its tributary, passing underneath a concrete bridge and crossing a forest road, entering Rice Fork on the right about 7.2 miles (11.6 km) upstream from the lake. Blue Slides Creek (tributary to Bear Creek) begins at about 4,400 feet (1,300 m), on the west slope of Goat Mountain's northwest ridge, and flows west for about 4.2 miles (6.8 km) down a steep canyon, finally paralleling the south side of Forest Road M-10 (county road 301-C), as it enters Bear Creek on the left just after the bridge.

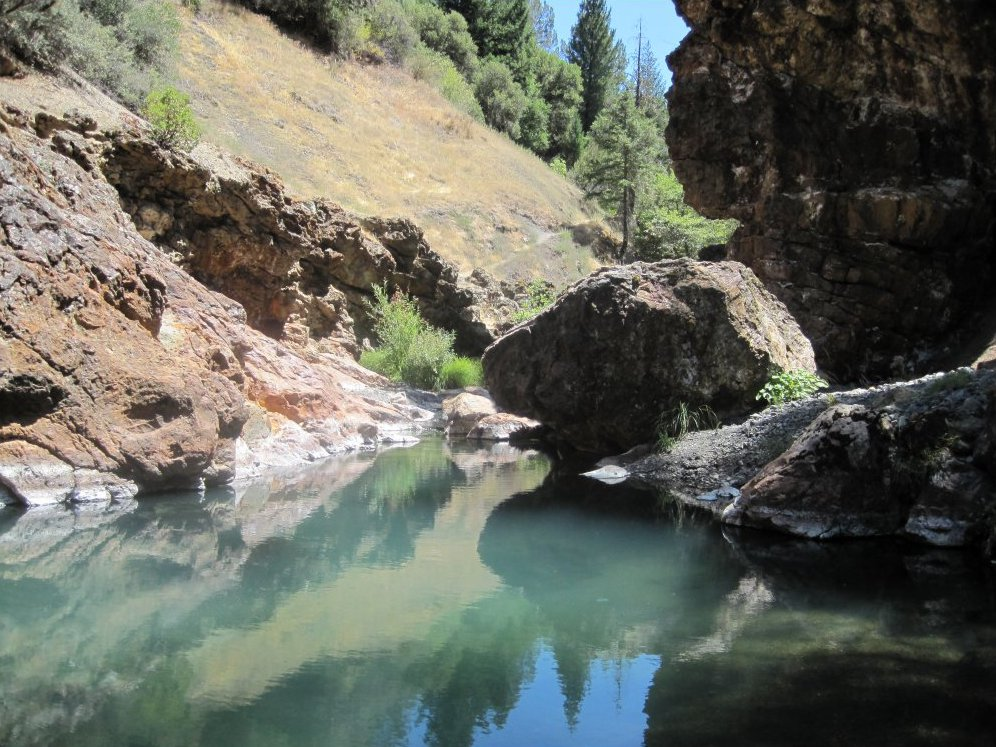
Rice Fork at Crabtree Hot Springs

Bevans Creek begins at about 3,200 feet (980 m) above sea level on Horse Mountain and flows northeasterly for about 3.5 miles (5.6 km) down a steep canyon, entering Rice Fork on the left about 5.5 miles (8.9 km) upstream from the lake.

Rice Creek begins at about 6,100 feet (1,900 m) on the west ridge of Snow Mountain-West. It swiftly descends the steep west slope of the mountain, flowing southwesterly for about 8.1 miles (13.0 km) down a steep canyon, crossing a forest road and passing through Rice Valley, entering Rice Fork on the right about 4.3 miles (6.9 km) upstream from the lake.

Deer Creek begins at about 5,400 feet (1,600 m) on the west ridge of Snow Mountain-West, and flows west for about 6.5 miles (10.5 km) down a steep canyon, crossing a forest road, entering Rice Fork on the right about 1.6 miles (2.6 km) upstream from the lake.

Willow Creek begins at about 3,400 feet (1,000 m) on Horse Mountain and flows northeasterly for about 5 miles (8 km) down a steep canyon, entering Rice Fork on the left about 1.2 miles (1.9 km) upstream from the lake.

Packsaddle Creek begins at about 3,600 feet (1,100 m) on Pine Mountain and flows northeasterly for about 3.1 miles (5.0 km) down a steep canyon, entering Rice Fork on the left near Swallow Rock, at the southern tip of the lake.

== River crossings, campgrounds and trailheads ==
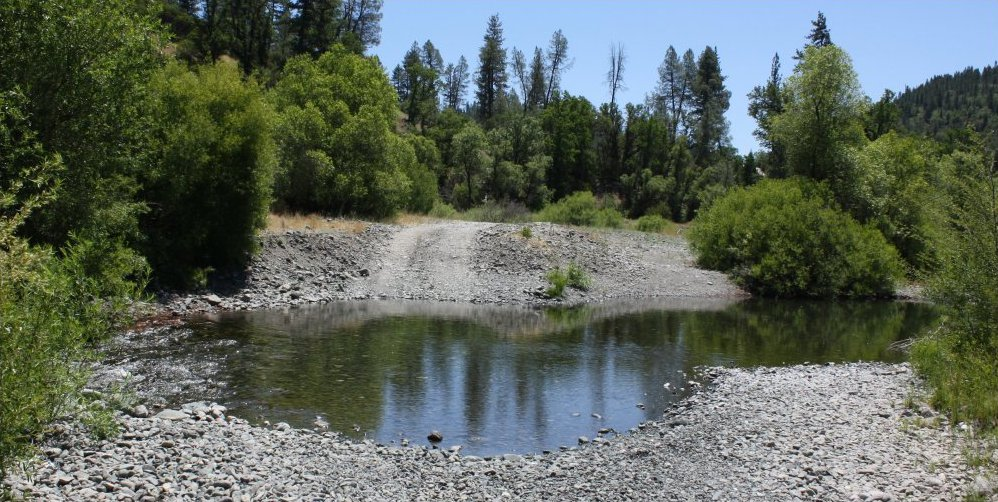
Rice Fork at Forest Road M-10 crossing July 2010

=== River and creek crossings ===
- Forest Road 17N04 (Twin Valley Road) crosses both Rice Fork and Salt Creek at their confluence.
- Forest Road M-10 (county road 301-C) crosses Rice Fork a short distance downstream from its confluence with Bear Creek.
- Forest Road M-10 (county road 301-C) bridges Bear Creek at its confluence with Blue Slides Creek.
- Forest Road M-3 (18N04) crosses Rice Creek about 2 miles north of its junction with Forest Road M-10 (county road 301-C).
- Forest Road M-3 (18N04) crosses Deer Creek about 5 miles north of its junction with Forest Road M-10 (county road 301-C).
- Forest Road 17N16 (Long Ridge Road) crosses Bear Creek at its junction with Forest Road M-10 (county road 301-C).

=== Campgrounds and trailheads ===
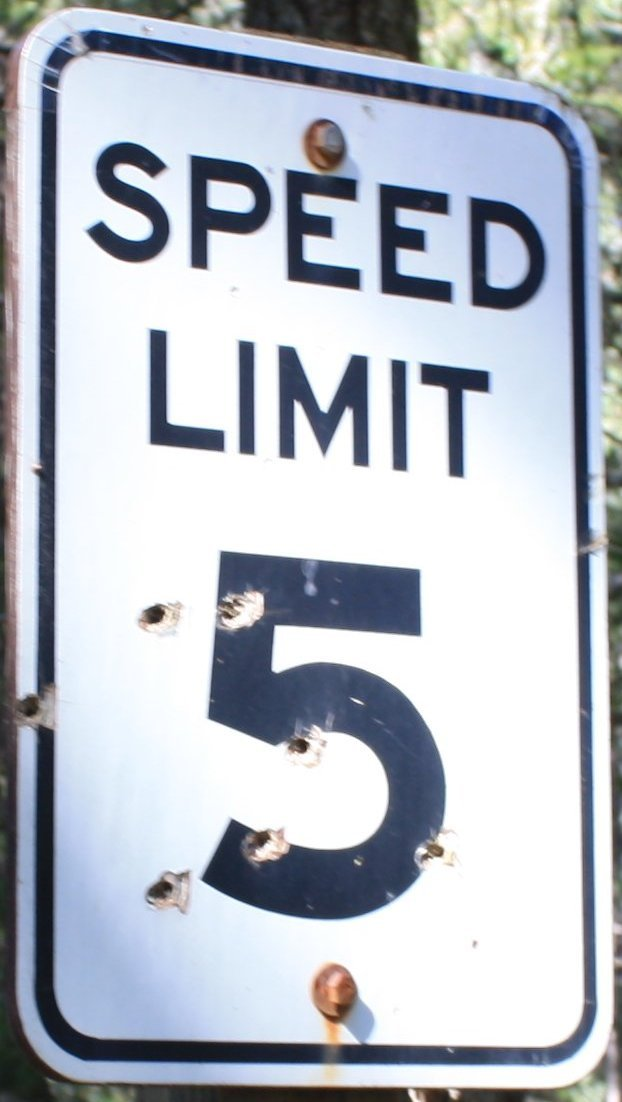
campgrounds

- Bear Creek Campground (USFS) – Free & open all year, maximum stay 14 days, 16 picnic tables & grilles + 2 toilets, elevation 2,000 feet (610 m). Set beside Bear Creek near its confluence with Blue Slides Creek, on Forest Road M-10 (county road 301-C) about 9 miles (14 km) northeast from its junction with Elk Mountain Road. This is the only public campground in the Rice Fork Eel River watershed.
- Summit Springs Trailhead is located at about 5,200 feet (1,600 m) on the south ridge of Snow Mountain-West. A hiking trail follows the ridge line to the top of 7,038-foot (2,145 m) Snow Mountain West Peak and 7,056-foot (2,151 m) East Peak. Forest Road M-10 (county road 301-C) crosses the south ridge at about 4,300 feet (1,300 m). A secondary forest road continues up the ridge to the trailhead.

== See also ==
- Rivers of Lake County, California
