= Newman Springs, California =

Newman Springs
- Unincorporated community
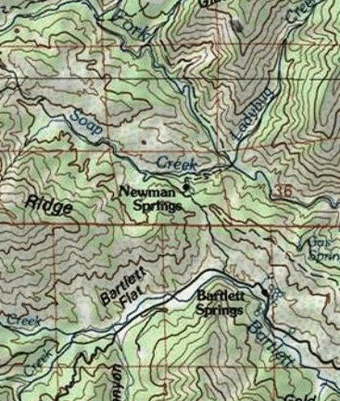
- Newman Springs on Soap Creek just above its convergence with North Fork Cache Creek

- Location in California Newman Springs (the United States)
- Coordinates: 39.1961958°N 122.7172599°W
- Country: United States
- State: California
- County: Lake County
- Elevation: 2,159 ft (658 m)

Newman Springs (formerly, Soap Creek Springs) is a set of springs in Lake County, California. At one time there was a resort at the springs.

== Location ==
Newman Springs are on Soap Creek 15 miles (24 km) north of Clearlake Oaks. They are 45 miles (72 km) west of Williams. They are at an elevation of 2159 feet (658 m). Soap Creek is named after the borax contained in the spring waters.

== Springs ==
According to G.A. Waring, who visited the springs around 1910,

Newman Springs are about 1.5 miles north of west from Bartlett Springs, and issue along the channel of Soap Creek; hence they are sometimes referred to as the Soap Creek Springs. The spring farthest downstream—which is the principal one—emerges at the creek side at the base of a prominent ledge of serpentine that forms the eastern border of a belt of this rock and the contact zone between it and crumpled shales and siliceous sediments that continue eastward. The spring yields about 15 gallons a minute of mildly carbonated water 86° in temperature, that is turbid with iron. The water is conducted across the creek in a trough to a small plunge bathhouse. A spring in the creek bed about 75 yards above (southwest of) the main spring, forms the Borax Pool, which contains warm, turbid water that is considered to be of exceptional value for bathing. The serpentine belt continues for about 100 yards upstream (westward) from it and is then succeeded by schistose rock, from which seepages and slight flows of warm carbonated water issue in at least seven places along a distance of about 275 yards or to a point about a quarter of a mile above the main spring. Temperatures of 72° to 92° were noted in these small springs.

== Resort ==
The State Mineralogist in 1914 wrote,

Newman Spring. This place is known locally as "Soap Creek," on account of borax being a prominent constituent in the water. It is used as a bathing resort, there being a walled-in swimming pool. It is 1.5 miles north of Bartlett Springs, and is owned by Geo. Young of Bartlett Springs, being leased to W. W. Tallman.

== Sources ==
- Austin, Carl F.; Austin, Ward H. Jr.; Leonard, G.W. (September 1971), Geothermal Science and Technology A National Program (PDF), Naval Weapons Center
- Durham, David L. (1998). California's Geographic Names: A Gazetteer of Historic and Modern Names of the State. Clovis, California: Word Dancer Press. p. 113. ISBN 1-884995-14-4.
- Hamilton, Fletcher (July 1915), "Report of State Mineralogist, 1913-1914", Appendix to the Journals of the Senate and Assembly of the forty-second session of the Legislature of the State of California, vol. VII
- "Newman Springs", Geographic Names Information System, United States Geological Survey, United States Department of the Interior
- Waring, Gerald Ashley (1915). Springs of California. U.S. Geological Survey Water Supply Paper. Vol. 338. U.S. Government Printing Office. doi:10.3133/wsp338.
