= Bartlett Creek, Tuolumne County, California =

River in California, United States

Coordinates: 38°01′27″N 119°48′06″W

Bartlett Creek is a river in Tuolumne County, California, United States.

Bartlett Creek heads at Bartlett Peak from which it takes its name.

== See also ==
- List of rivers of California
