= Adams, California =

Adams
- Resort
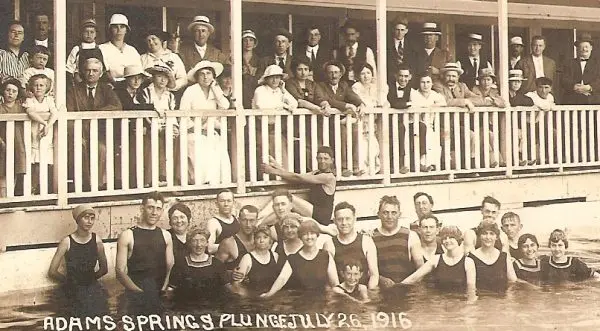
- Adam Springs Plunge on 26 July 1916

- Location in California Adams (the United States)
- Coordinates: 38°51′23″N 122°43′11″W
- Country: United States
- State: California
- County: Lake
- Elevation: 2,815 ft (858 m)

Adams is an unincorporated community in Lake County, California, United States. It was formerly known as Adams Springs, a summer resort developed around a small group of mineral water springs.

== Springs ==
The Adams Springs are beside Big Canyon Creek. (Note: Hamilton states that the springs are in a canyon at the head of Putah Creek. Waring just states that they are in a ravine. A map view using the location provided by the USGS shows they are on the south side of Big Canyon Creek, near its head, to the north of a tributary of that creek. Big Canyon Creek is a tributary of Putah Creek.) They are south of Seigler Mountain. The springs are at an elevation of 2815 feet (858 m). They are in a deep ravine about 2 miles (3.2 km) east of Astorg Spring. Along the steep slopes of the ravine, the exposed rocks are sandstone and shale. Higher up these sediments are covered by basaltic or andesitic lava.

A 1914 description stated, "The main spring is at the hotel, and is an alkaline carbon-dioxated water very pleasant to drink. Its temperature is 50 °F (10 °C), and it has considerable free carbon-dioxide gas. There are also several other smaller springs. They have been bottling water from the main springs for the past twenty years. but only during the summer season. The spring water is alkaline, and strongly carbonated, with a petroleum odor and taste.

== Community ==
Adams Springs is 3 miles (4.8 km) north of Whispering Pines. It is 7 miles (11 km) southwest of Lower Lake and 30 miles (48 km) north of Calistoga. Adams is north of Hobergs and south of Loch Lomond. It is bounded by the CA175 highway to the west and by the Boggs Mountain Demonstration State Forest on the other three sides. Adams Springs Golf Course is on the other side of CA 175 to the south of Adams. The zip code for Adams is 95461.

== History ==
The springs were discovered by Charles Adams in 1869. He bought them in 1872. A small campground with tents was laid out near the springs. William Robert Prather was the son of a successful self-taught dentist. He completed dental school and qualified as a doctor. He acquired Adams Springs about 1885 and later increased his land holdings to about 5,000 acres (2,000 ha). Prather transformed the springs into a high-quality health spa.

Development of the resort started in the late 19th century. A large drain pipe was laid in the stream bed to carry off storm water, and the ravine was widened and levelled to make space for buildings. Prather corresponded with Thomas Edison in the late 1890s, who told him how to build a Pelton wheel in Big Canyon Creek to generate electricity for the resort. Prather planted fruit trees, ran a farm, and raised cattle where the Adams Springs Golf Course is today. He added cabins and campsites around the spring, and advertised aggressively.

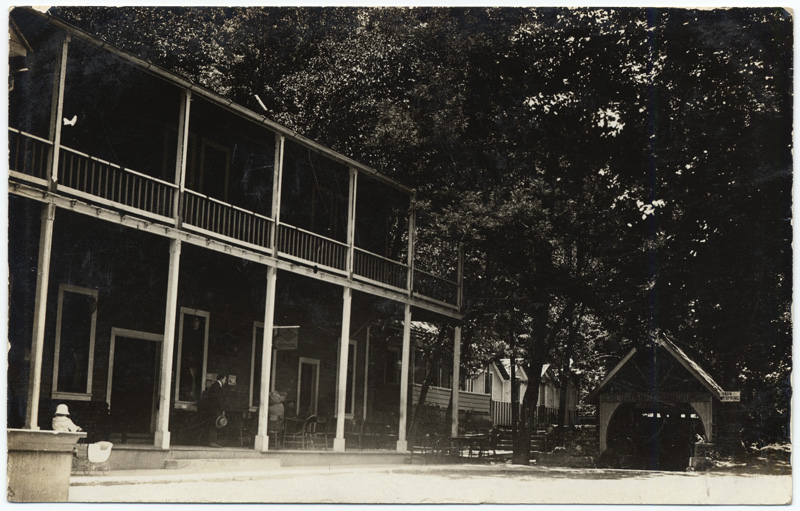
The hotel in 1921

The resort became popular about 1900. A post office operated at Adams from 1908 to 1960. In 1910 the resort had a large frame hotel and several cottages and tents. There was a swimming plunge on the hillside above the springs supplied by water piped from the stream. Some people used the water for its medicinal value, but it was mainly a summer pleasure resort. There was a well equipped hotel and a number of cottages, with accommodations for a total of 350 guests.

In 1927 Prather erected a large new hotel on the edge of Big Canyon, with many windows, surrounded by a large covered deck. In the period before World War II (1939–1945) the Merced Band would play dance music in the evenings to visitors who had motored up from San Francisco for the weekend. Prather died in 1938 after his second son Clarence Prather had taken over management. The new hotel caught fire and burned to the ground in 1943. After this Clarence Prather ran the resort at a loss for a few more years before breaking up and selling the property. In the 1960s the remaining buildings were condemned and destroyed by burning. What remained of the resort was destroyed in the Valley Fire of 2015.

== Sources ==
- Durham, David L. (1998). California's Geographic Names: A Gazetteer of Historic and Modern Names of the State. Clovis, California: Word Dancer Press. p. 7. ISBN 1-884995-14-4.
- Hamilton, Fletcher (July 1915), "Report of State Mineralogist, 1913-1914", Appendix to the Journals of the Senate and Assembly of the forty-second session of the Legislature of the State of California, vol. VII
- Hoberg, Donna (2007), Resorts of Lake County, Arcadia Publishing, ISBN 9780738547985
- "Node: Adams (141040272)", OpenStreetMap
- Wakefield, David (October 2, 2020), "The Springs That Made Lake County Famous: Adams Springs", The Lake County Bloom
- Waring, Gerald Ashley (1915). Springs of California. U.S. Geological Survey Water Supply Paper. Vol. 338. U.S. Government Printing Office. doi:10.3133/wsp338.
