= Adobe Creek (Lake County, California) =

River in Lake County, California, United States

Coordinates: 39°01′47″N 122°52′36″W

Adobe Creek is a river that flows for 11 miles in a northeastern direction to Clear Lake in Lake County, California. Species that inhabit the river include the California roach (Hesperoleucus symmetricus).
