= Hough Springs, California =

Hough Springs
- Unincorporated community
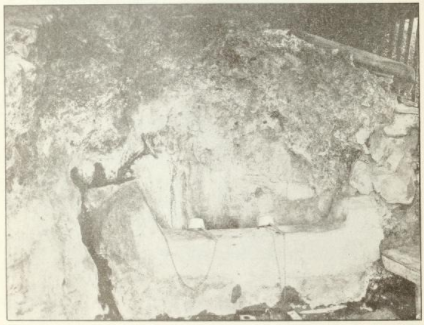
- Soda Springs and Grotto at Hough Springs

- Location in California Hough Springs (the United States)
- Coordinates: 39°09′45″N 122°36′44″W
- Country: United States
- State: California
- County: Lake County
- Elevation: 1,535 ft (468 m)

Hough Springs (formerly, Hough's Mineral Springs) is a set of springs that was turned into a resort in the 19th century in Lake County, California.

== Location ==
The Hough Springs resort was on the main stage road (303) from Williams to Bartlett Springs, 8 miles (13 km) east of Bartlett. It is 26 miles (42 km) west from the railroad at Williams. The springs are on the north shore of the north fork of Cache Creek at a point where the canyon widens into a flat several acres in extent, on a hillside near the hotel. The resort is 10 miles (16 km) north-northeast of Clearlake Oaks. It is at an elevation of 1535 feet (468 m).

== Springs ==
The two main springs were Soda, 60 °F (16 °C) and Iron and Magnesia, 61 °F (16 °C). The Soda spring gave an excellent "seltzer" water with plenty of snap due to the large quantity of carbonic acid gas. The well at the hotel was an "iron" water, and there was a White Sulphur spring in the creek bank below the hotel, that was not being used.

== History ==
Originally a resort, which by 1910 could accommodate 100 guests. A post office operated at Hough Springs from 1882 to 1892, with a closure in 1886 to 1887. The hotel, cottages and tents could accommodate about 150 visitors. They were owned by the Bartels brothers.

The Bartels brothers located two claims on a deposit of mineral paint, found one a low spur off one of the higher mountain ridges, reached by trail from Hough Springs. It was said to be exposed for a width of 100 feet (30 m) and a length of 1,500 feet (460 m). There were two colors lying beside each other, one a burnt umber and burnt sienna, and the other a slightly dark yellow ochre. The material only needed to be screened and bolted to prepare it for use as paint. Pits had been dug to confirm that the deposit was at least 10 feet (3.0 m) deep, and small amounts had been used for painting around Hough Springs, with favorable results.

== Sources ==
- Hamilton, Fletcher (December 1914), "Mineral Paint", Mines and Mineral Resources of Portions of California (Appendix to the Journals of the Senate and Assembly of the 42nd session of the Legislature of the State of California)
- Durham, David L. (1998). California's Geographic Names: A Gazetteer of Historic and Modern Names of the State. Clovis, California: Word Dancer Press. p. 80. ISBN 1-884995-14-4. >
- "Hough Springs", Geographic Names Information System, United States Geological Survey, United States Department of the Interior
- Waring, Gerald Ashley (1915). Springs of California. U.S. Geological Survey Water Supply Paper. Vol. 338. U.S. Government Printing Office. doi:10.3133/wsp338.
