= Forbes Creek (California) =

Coordinates: 39.041°N 122.912°W

Forbes Creek is a 4.7-mile-long (7.6 km) watercourse in Lake County, California which empties into Clear Lake at the city of Lakeport.

In 1989, a major project was undertaken in the Forbes Creek basin by the city of Lakeport. A bypass pipe was installed between approximately Tunis and Main streets to divert flood flows from the Forbes Creek channel where it winds through a heavily populated residential and commercial area. Forbes Creek was analyzed in the City of Lakeport General Plan 2020 to establish guidelines for land development within the city of Lakeport to protect riparian natural features as well as lives and property from flooding risk. The Central Valley Regional Water Control Board of the State of California reports that in 1978 several hundred gallons of gasoline leaked into Forbes Creek, and subsequently the source was remediated, but not eliminated.

The creek was named after pioneer William Forbes, a wagon maker and undertaker, who came to the area in 1858. Forbes purchased 160 acres (65 ha) on which to build his home and farm. When the county was investigating sites for the county seat, Forbes offered 40 acres (16 ha) of his property, for which the electorate thanked him for his generosity by naming the town after him. Although the town no longer bears his name, Forbes Creek still does.

== See also ==
- Flood control
- Rivers of Lake County, California
