= Justice Bartlett =

Justice Bartlett or Judge Bartlett may refer to:

- Edward T. Bartlett (1841–1910), judge of the New York Court of Appeals
- Ara Bartlett (1825–after 1880), chief justice of the Supreme Court of the Dakota Territory
- Josiah Bartlett (1729–1795), chief justice of the New Hampshire Superior Court
- Willard Bartlett (1846–1925), chief judge of the New York Court of Appeals
