= Bartlett Creek, Lake County, California =

River in California, United States

Bartlett Creek
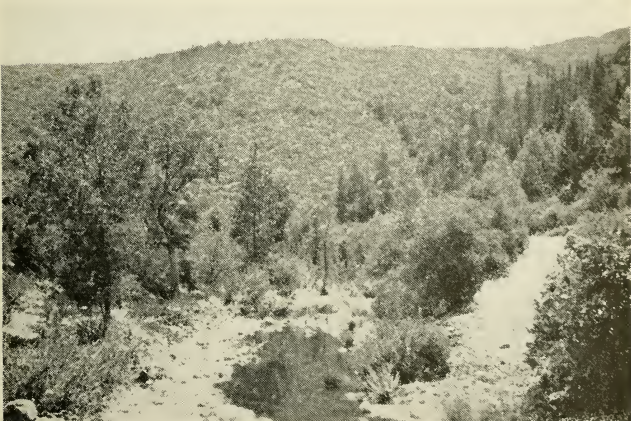
- Bartlett Creek from bridge 1.5 miles above mouth

- Location within California Location within the United States

Physical characteristics
- Source
  - coordinates: 39.1772222°N 122.7338889°W
- Mouth: North Fork Cache Creek
  - coordinates: 39.167077°N 122.640994°W
  - elevation: 1,631 feet (497 m)
- Length: 6.5 miles (10.5 km)

Bartlett Creek is a creek in Lake County, California. It is a tributary of North Fork Cache Creek.

== Description ==
Bartlett Creek is a 6.5 miles (10.5 km) long tributary of North Fork Cache Creek. Its mouth is at an elevation of 1,631 feet (497 m). A bridge crosses the creek about 1.5 miles (2.4 km) above its mouth. At this point the creek undergoes a transition from a trout stream to a cyprinid and sucker stream.

The creek drains the Bartlett Management Area of the Mendocino National Forest. The terrain is moderately steep and rugged, with elevations from 1,400 to 4,800 feet (430 to 1,460 m). The Köppen climate classification is Csb : Warm-summer Mediterranean climate. Vegetation is mainly chamise and chaparral on the south slopes, and stands of timber on the ridgetops and north slopes.

== Mineral springs ==
Bartlett Springs is near the head of Bartlett Creek. The Allen Springs are in the Bartlett Creek (Note: Waring (1915) says the Allen Springs are in the Allen Creek canyon rather than the Bartlett Creek canyon, but otherwise describes a location that agrees with Hamilton (1915) and mindat.) canyon 3 miles (4.8 km) below Bartlett Springs on the road between Williams and Bartlett Springs.

== See also ==
- Rivers of Lake County, California

== Sources ==
- "Allen Springs, Lake County, California, United States", mindat
- "Bartlett Creek", Geographic Names Information System, United States Geological Survey, United States Department of the Interior, 19 January 1981
- "Bartlett Creek, Lake County, California, United States", Mindat
- Forest Supervisor's Office (1995), Mendocino National Forest (N.F.), Land and Resource(s) Management Plan (LRMP): Environmental Impact Statement, United States Department of Agriculture Forest Service
- Hamilton, Fletcher (July 1915), "Report of State Mineralogist, 1913-1914", Appendix to the Journals of the Senate and Assembly of the forty-second session of the Legislature of the State of California, vol. VII
- Shapovalov, Leo (April 1947), "Report on fisheries resources in connection with the proposed Yolo-Solano development of the United States Bureau of Reclamation" (PDF), California Fish and Game, 33 (2), San Francisco: State of California, Resources Agency, Dept. of Fish and Game
- Waring, Gerald Ashley (1915). Springs of California. U.S. Geological Survey Water Supply Paper. Vol. 338. U.S. Government Printing Office. doi:10.3133/wsp338.
