= Bartlett Peak =

Mountain in the American state of California

- Location within California

Highest point
- Elevation: 8,301 ft (2,530 m)
- Prominence: 279 ft (85 m)
- Coordinates: 38°5′35.71″N 119°46′27.76″W

Geography
- Location: Yosemite National Park, Tuolumne County, California, United States
- Parent range: Sierra Nevada
- Topo map: USGS Kibbie Lake

Bartlett Peak is a summit in Yosemite National Park, California. With an elevation of 8,304 feet (2,531 m), Bartlett Peak is the 944th highest summit in the state of California.

Bartlett Peak was named for G. H. C. Bartlett, a professor at West Point.
