= Bartlett Springs, California =

Bartlett Springs
- Unincorporated community
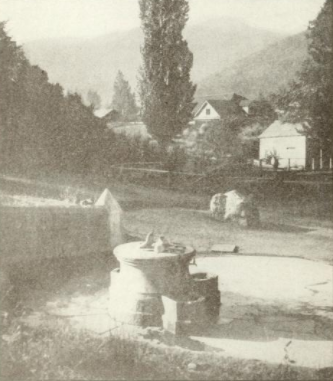
- The Bartlett Spring, hotel in background

- Location in California Bartlett Springs (the United States)
- Coordinates: 39°11′02″N 122°42′16″W
- Country: United States
- State: California
- County: Lake County
- Elevation: 2,146 ft (654 m)

Bartlett Springs is a set of springs around which a resort was developed in Lake County, California. There were four improved springs, each delivering cool carbonated water with considerable amounts of suspended iron. In 1914 it was the largest such resort in Lake County, capable of accommodating up to 500 guests. There was also a bottling plant designed to maintain the natural carbonation as the bottles were filled and capped. It could fill 10,000 per day during the season from May to October when the roads were passable.

== Location ==
Bartlett Springs is 11 miles (18 km) north of Clearlake Oaks, at an elevation of 2146 feet (654 m). It is near the head of Bartlett Creek, a tributary of Cache Creek. The springs are mostly on the slopes some distance above the resort. The rocks around the springs are altered sandstone, shale and serpentine.

== Springs ==
The Main Spring or Bartlett Spring is in the northern part of site at the foot of the steep slope. As of 1911 it was surrounded by a cement floor and its water was fed up into a tin-lined cement basin that was used as a drinking fountain. Pipes carried water from the spring to a small fountain at the hotel and to the bottling building. The water is at a temperature of 56 °F (13 °C), mildly carbonated and alkaline.

Aperient Spring is on the hillside northeast of the Main Spring, reached by a zigzag trail about 200 yards (180 m) long. As of 1911 it was in a small springhouse. It produced about 2 US gallons (7.6 L; 1.7 imp gal) per minute of moderately carbonated water with considerable suspended iron at a temperature of 61 °F (16 °C). Its water was used for drinking and also piped to a swimming plunge.

The Soda-magnesia Spring is at the base of a steep slope about 100 yards (91 m) southeast of Aperient Spring. It delivers about 3 US gallons (11 L; 2.5 imp gal) per minute of coll, moderately carbonated water that is piped to large storage tanks, and from there to the resort. It also deposits considerable amounts of suspended iron. It is alkaline, with more magnesium than Main Spring.

The Gas Spring is about 3/4 mile (1.2 km) along a trail northeast of the Main Spring over a divide into the basin of the North Fork of Cache Creek. It is a shallow pool up to 3 feet (0.91 m) wide and 10 feet (3.0 m) long. There is only a small overflow seeping from the pool in summer, but the water is constantly turbulent due to large bubbles of carbon dioxide.

== Resort ==
Barlett Springs were discovered by Green Bartlett when he was on a camping trip in 1869. He was suffering from rheumatism and found that the waters helped him. He acquired the property and established a resort. Bartlett's resort could accommodate 500 guests. A post office operated at Bartlett Springs from 1873 to 1935. As of 1914 it was the largest resort in Lake County with the most accommodations. The resort had a resident physician during the season from mid-May to October Beside the main hotel there were large numbers of cottages and several other buildings including a general merchandise store, drugstore, bakery and butcher's shop. The resort was destroyed in a fire in 2007.

== Bottling plant ==
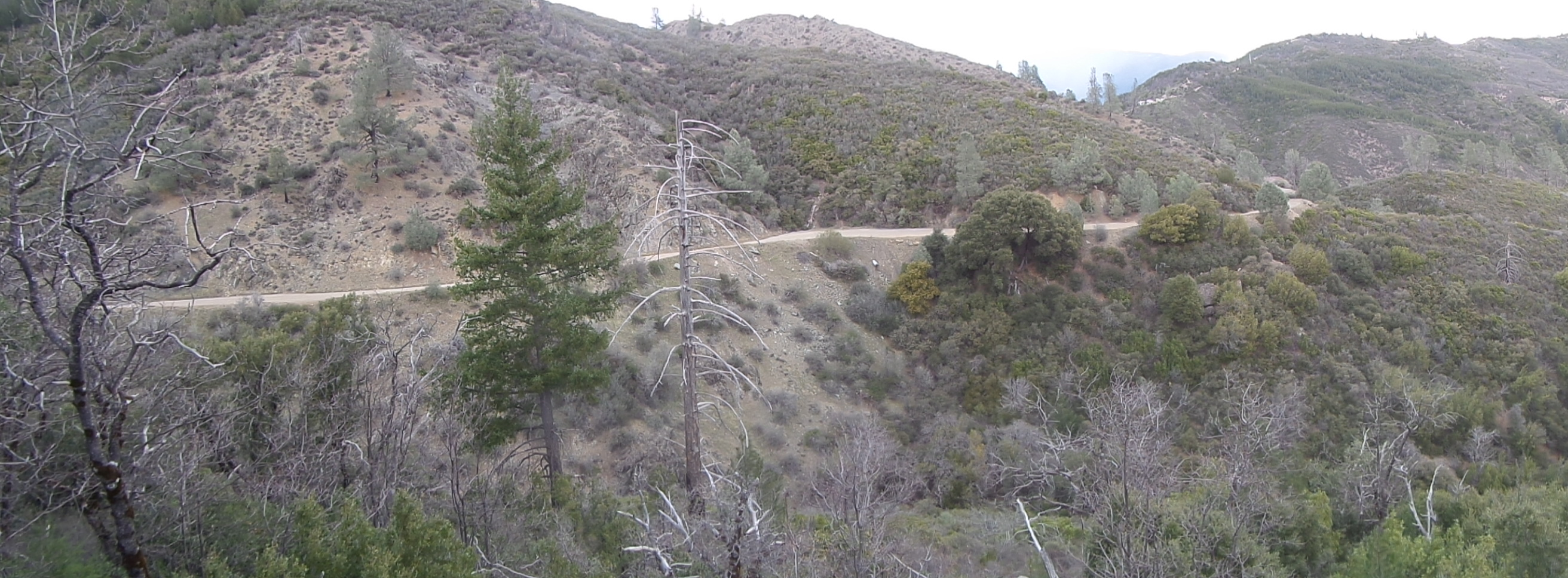
Bartlett Springs Road

The bottling works were below the hotel and the spring, so received a good hydraulic head. The water was taken from the bottom of the spring through a tin pipe to prevent the natural gas from escaping from the water. The water ran through a Berkefeld filter, then the bottles were filled by a tube that ran to the bottom of the bottle. As soon as each bottle was filled it was hermetically closed with a clamped cap. Each bottle was checked to make sure it was properly filled and free of organic matter before being packed for transport. A gasoline engine provided power for machines at the bottling plant including a bottle washer, labeling machine and conveyor belt. 15 men worked at the plant, which could produce 10,000 bottles during a 9-hour day. The plant only operated in Summer and Fall, when the roads were in good condition, since there were no storage facilities. Between May and October there were about ten mule teams, each with 8-12 mules, hauling the cases of bottles to the railroad at Williams.

== Sources ==
- "Bartlett Springs", Geographic Names Information System, United States Geological Survey, United States Department of the Interior, 19 January 1981
- Durham, David L. (1998). California's Geographic Names: A Gazetteer of Historic and Modern Names of the State. Clovis, California: Word Dancer Press. p. 13. ISBN 1-884995-14-4.
- Hamilton, Fletcher (July 1915), "Report of State Mineralogist, 1913-1914", Appendix to the Journals of the Senate and Assembly of the forty-second session of the Legislature of the State of California, vol. VII
- Waring, Gerald Ashley (1915). Springs of California. U.S. Geological Survey Water Supply Paper. Vol. 338. U.S. Government Printing Office. doi:10.3133/wsp338.
