= Middle Creek (Lake County, California) =

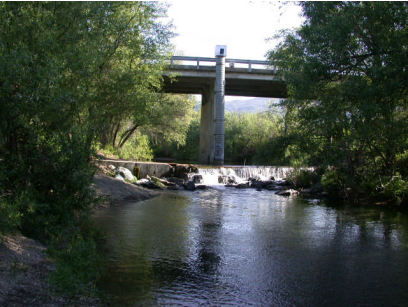
- Rancheria bridge on Middle Creek

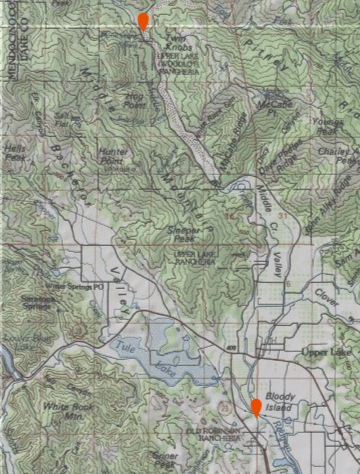
- Course of Middle Creek from north to south

- Location within California Location within the United States

Location
- Country: United States
- State: California
- County: Lake County

Physical characteristics
- Source
  - coordinates: 39.250999°N 122.9511085°W
- Mouth: Rodman Slough
  - coordinates: 39.1484°N 122.9129°W
  - elevation: 1,325 feet (404 m)

Middle Creek is a creek that drains through Rodman Slough into Clear Lake in Lake County, California. It supplies 21% of the streamflow to Clear Lake. The watershed vegetation has been drastically modified by European settlers through sheep and cattle grazing, logging and farming in the valley floors. The creek once flowed through extensive wetlands at its mouth, but these were mainly drained to create farmland, apart from Rodman Slough on the west side. There are now projects to restore the drained land to its original condition.

== Location ==
Middle Creek forms where West Fork Middle Creek and East Fork Middle Creek combine to the west of Pitnay Ridge and south of Elk Mountain. It flows south for 8.5 miles (13.7 km) to join Scotts Creek to form Rodman Slough. The mouth of Middle Creek is at an elevation of 1,329 feet (405 m) in Lake County, California.

== Geology ==
The Middle Creek watershed is underlain by the Franciscan Complex, a chaotic assembly of sediments and ocean floor scraped up by the advancing North American Plate. Rocks include greywacke sandstone, mudstone, greenstone, and blueschist. The Clear Lake basin lies between the watersheds of the Sacramento River and the Russian River. When it was formed about 600,000 years ago it flowed east into the Sacramento Valley. About 200,000 years ago the Clear Lake Volcanic Field blocked its outlet. The lake rose until it found a new outlet, draining west through the Blue Lakes into Cold Creek and the Russian River. At some time in the last 10,000 years a landslide at the west end of the Blue Lakes blocked this outlet, the lake rose again, and created its present outlet via Cache Creek to the Sacramento River.

== Hydrology ==
The Middle Creek watershed is a sub-watershed of the Clear Lake Basin. It is 99.5% contained in Lake County and 0.5% in Mendocino County. It includes the watersheds of Alley Creek and Clover Creek. It covers 50,155 acres (20,297 ha) (16.5%) of the Clear Lake Basin, and supplies 21% of the streamflow to Clear Lake. Elevations in the watershed range from 4,840 feet (1,480 m) at High Glade Lookout in the north to about 1,349 feet (411 m) where Clover Creek joins Middle Creek. The east and west forks of the creek join at an elevation of about 1,480 feet (450 m). The Middle Creek and Clover Creek valleys combine to form a single valley north of the town of Upper Lake. (Note: The confluence of Middle Creek and Clover Creek is south of Upper Lake.)

Scotts Creek and Middle Creek supply about 70% of the sediment and nutrients delivered to Clear Lake, which cause the algae population to increase in the lake. During periods of heavy runoff, the two creeks raise the level of the slough and the water moves at significant speed. Fine sediments are carried into Clear Lake, while coarse sediments are gradually filling in the slough. The high flows also erode the levees that protect adjacent reclaimed farmland.

== Tributaries ==
Stream	GNIS id	Parent	Mouth			Length	
Stream	GNIS id	Parent	Coords	Elev ft	Elev m	mi	km
Middle Creek	234282	Rodman Slough	39°08′54″N 122°54′45″W	1,329	405	8.5	13.7
←Basin Creek	256573	Middle Creek	39°35′34″N 122°51′33″W	3,448	1,051	1	1.6
←West Fork Middle Creek	268908	Middle Creek	39°15′04″N 122°57′04″W	1,480	450	6.5	10.5
←←Bear Creek	266426	West Fork Middle Creek	39°16′14″N 122°58′33″W	1,598	487	2.5	4.0
←East Fork Middle Creek	266680	Middle Creek	39°15′03″N 122°57′04″W	1,476	450	9	14
←Chair Creek	233652	Middle Creek	39°14′15″N 122°56′43″W	1,450	440	2	3.2
←Salt Flat Creek	234616	Middle Creek	39°13′36″N 122°56′31″W	1,444	440	2	3.2
←Kirkpatrick Creek	234111	Middle Creek	39°13′10″N 122°56′08″W	1,430	440		
←Clover Creek	233692	Middle Creek	39°09′34″N 122°54′48″W	1,342	409	8	13
←←Gilbert Creek	260558	Clover Creek	39°09′22″N 122°51′28″W	1,460	450	5.25	8.45
←←Alley Creek	233407	Clover Creek	39°10′41″N 122°53′47″W	1,365	416	6.25	10.06
←←←Poge Creek	234489	Alley Creek	39°11′01″N 122°53′34″W	1,368	417	3	4.8

== Changes in land use ==
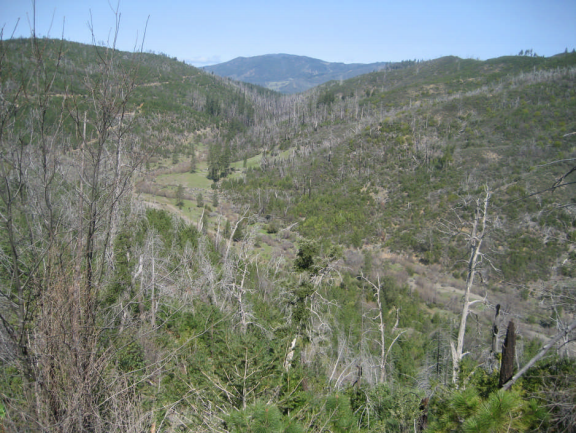
Upper portion of east fork of Middle Creek

At the start of the historical period the watershed was mostly occupied by Eastern Pomo, but they were in contact with Northern Pomo, with whom they intermarried The arrival of Europeans devastated the native population, who died of new diseases and were forced to relocate and to work for the Europeans on pain of severe punishment or death. From the 1860s sheep were introduced, grazing in the lower valleys in spring and moving to higher ground in the summer. Fire was used to improve forage. The fires and extensive logging drastically changed the ecology, including the riparian areas. Sheep and goat peaked at 61,000 head in 1912. They no longer graze in the watershed. Cattle peaked at 11,600 head in 1922, and some cattle grazing continues.

Starting in the late 1860s many sawmills were opened in the upper part of the watershed, and by the 1930s most of the accessible timber had been cut. Higher lumber prices after World War II (1939–1945) cost-justified construction of roads into almost all the timbered area of the watershed. Selective logging of conifers converted the forests to a mix of conifers and hardwood. Since the 1950s there have been efforts to reduce fuel in chaparral areas so as to reduce the risk and severity of fires. As of 2001 there were 1,027 acres of fruit and nut orchards in the watershed, but this has since declined.

== Changes in lower course ==
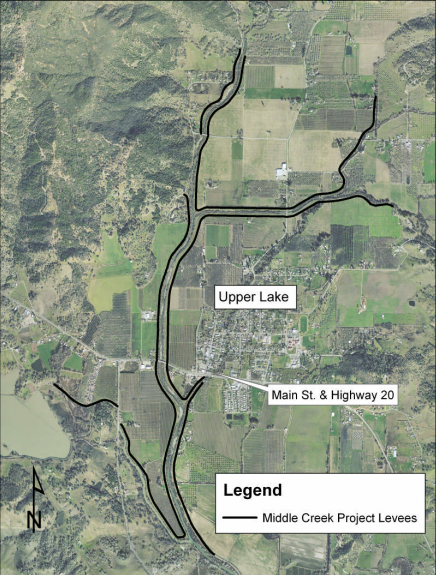
USACE Middle Creek Project Levees

Middle Creek used to join Scotts Creek at the eastern end of Tule Lake. The combined creek flow then branched into several channels that flowed through the present Reclamation Area and Rodman Slough. The former channels were still visible in aerial photographs from 1940 and 1952. The creeks flowed through Robinson Lake, also called Rodman Bay, before entering Clear Lake. Robinson Lake was a mosaic of shallow wetlands, meandering channels, riparian forest and open water.

In the early 1900s settlers re-routed Middle Creek to run directly south to Rodman Slough in the vicinity of Upper Lake, while an eastern fork joined Clover Creek. Between 1918 and 1933 farmers built levees in Robinson Lake and the area was drained for agriculture, leaving only the narrow Rodman Slough along the west of the former lake. As part of creation of the Edmonds Reclamation District in 1926 Clover and Middle Creeks were rerouted to their present locations, flowing south into Rodman Slough. The creeks were widened and deepened so they could be navigated. The heavy earth-moving equipment used to "reclaim" about 2,000 acres (810 ha) of wetland was one of the causes of a surge in sedimentation in Clear Lake after 1927.

Upper Lake experienced severe flooding in 1938, 1955 and 1957–1958. In 1954 the US Congress authorized the Middle Creek Project by the US Army Corps of Engineers to protect the community of Upper Lake and about 4,000 acres (1,600 ha) of agricultural land from flooding by the Middle, Scotts and Clover creeks. The project included 14.4 miles (23.2 km) of levees, diversions structures and a pumping station. It was completed in 1966. The state provided routine maintenance, flood fighting, levee patrolling and channel maintenance. The levees suffered from erosion and subsidence, and rather than giving 100-year protection as designed by 2000 were giving only 4-year protection.

The Middle Creek Restoration Project plans to remove 3 miles (4.8 km) of substandard levees. This will restore 1,400 acres (570 ha) of wetlands and open water, and will improve water quality in Clear Lake. In 2004 the Lake County water district signed a contract with the USACE to breach some of the levees and restore the former Robinson Lake. The Army Corps would cover 65% of the costs, but the water district had to compensate over 60 private property owners, raise a section of California State Route 20, reinforce seven PG&E power line pylons and replace a bridge on the Nice-Lucerne Cutoff. The water district moved slowly, and took 14 years to spend $12 million of funding that had been supplied by the state.

== See also ==
- Rivers of Lake County, California

== Sources ==
- "Appendix A Engineering Appendix", Middle Creek, Lake County, Flood Damage Reduction and Ecosystem Restoration, 2002
- Fuentes, Jerry (2002), Middle Creek, Lake County, Flood Damage Reduction and Ecosystem Restoration: Final Integrated Feasibility Report and Environmental Impact Statement, US Army Corps of Engineers
- Larson, Elizabeth (14 June 2019), "Supervisors approve $15 million contract with state for Middle Creek Restoration Project", Lake County News
- Lundquist, Erica (February 2010), Scotts Creek Watershed Assessment (PDF), Scotts Creek Watershed Council
- Lundquist, Erica (February 2010b), Middle Creek Watershed Assessment (PDF), Middle Creek Coordinated Resource Management and Planning Group
- "Middle Creek", Geographic Names Information System, United States Geological Survey, United States Department of the Interior
- Middle Creek (map), USGS
- "WT7 - Rodman Slough", Konocti Regional Trails, 2015
