= Saratoga Springs, California =

Unincorporated community in California, United States

Saratoga Springs
- Century-old building in Saratoga Springs

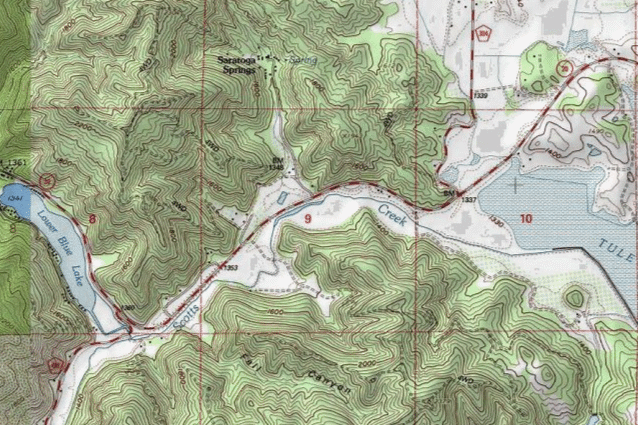
- Saratoga Springs (top, center) between Lower Blue Lake and Tule Lake

- Location in California Saratoga Springs (the United States)
- Coordinates: 39°10′31″N 122°58′51″W
- Country: United States
- State: California
- County: Lake
- Opened: 1873

Area
  - Total: 260 acres (110 ha)
- Elevation: 1,427 ft (435 m)
- Website: http://www.saratogasprings.com/

Saratoga Springs (formerly, Bachelor Springs and Pierson Springs) is a set of springs that was turned into a resort in the 1870s in Lake County, California, United States. At its peak, the resort could accommodate 250 people. The resort was closed after the main hotel burned down, but reopened as a retreat in 1991.

== Location ==
Saratoga Springs is located 4 miles (6.4 km) west of Upper Lake. It is at an elevation of 1427 feet (435 m). The town of Saratoga Springs was originally located 3.5 miles (5.6 km) north of its present location.

The springs are on the side of a wide, brushy drainage ravine. They are about 2 miles (3.2 km) as the crow flies from the Witter Medical Springs. They are 22 miles (35 km) east of Ukiah and 6 miles (9.7 km) west of Upper Lake. The springs are in the Scotts Creek watershed.

== Springs ==
The resort had 12 small mineral springs, of which 11 were on the slopes 100 to 150 yards (91 to 137 m) east of the hotel. Six of these rose in cemented basins in the Roundhouse, a circular building 15 feet (4.6 m) in diameter. Their combined flow is perhaps 1.5 US gallons (5.7 L; 1.2 imp gal) per minute. They are all carbonated and deposit small amounts of calcium and iron, and have names like Appetizer and Digester. There were four other springs rising in cemented basins near the Roundhouse. Their water was collected in a tank and used for bathing. About 75 yards (69 m) north of the Roundhouse a sulfur spring issued from the base of a bank of dark, crushed shale. It gave about 1 US gallon (3.8 L; 0.83 imp gal) per minute of strongly sulfureted water. The twelfth spring seeped from massive sandstone 2/5 mile (0.64 km) up the ravine from the hotel.

A 1914 report said the main springs and their temperatures are: Magnesia 1, 59 °F (15 °C); Magnesia 2, 61.5 °F (16.4 °C); Arsenic, 60 °F (16 °C); Sulphur, 60 °F (16 °C); Soda, 61.5 °F (16.4 °C); Iron, 61.5 °F (16.4 °C) and Seltzer, 59 °F (15 °C). The water was not bottled for sale.

== History ==
Before the resort was founded the springs were frequented by the Pomo, who used the valley for healing and peacemaking.

The first owner of what became the resort was J.W. Pearson, who found the springs in a wooded valley of the foothills in 1871. He filed a preemption claim for 160 acres (65 ha) in 1874, and built a hotel and several cottages around the mineral springs. In 1878 Pearson sold the property, then known as Pierson Springs, to J.J. Kerbert. The U.S. government finally issued a patent for the land in 1879. Soon after John Marhten acquired the property, which he ran until he died in 1913. Marhten made many improvements including a new hotel, annexes and more cottages. By 1891 the resort could accommodate 350 people, with a barn for 40 horses.

Century-old cabins

At its peak the resort covered 260 acres (110 ha) and had a stagecoach stop, post office, restaurant and dance hall. It offered multiple cold mineral springs for bathing and a bottling plant for drinking. Guests from the San Francisco Bay Area would reach the resort by taking a train to Cloverdale, then a stagecoach via Ukiah. In 1910 there were accommodations for 250 people in the hotel, annex and 16 cottages set in an oak grove in a small flat area beside the creek.

The post office at the springs was called Bachelor. The Bachelor post office opened in 1882, moved to the new site in 1883, closed in 1919, reopened in 1920, and closed for good in 1940.

The owner in 1915 was John Martens Estate. In 1920 E.R. Keil and his wife bought the resort. A 1922 guide to California resorts said Saratoga Springs could be reached by Northwestern Pacific Railroad to Ukiah, and from there 22 miles (35 km) by stagecoach. The large, level grounds were all shaded by oak and walnut trees. Cold and carbonated mineral waters had laxative, appetizer or digestive properties. There was a 30 by 50 feet (9.1 by 15.2 m) concrete plunge with carbonated and very invigorating water. The resort had electric lights throughout, telephone, post office and store. Hotels rates were $19 to $22 per week, while housekeeping cabins were $10 to $15 per week.

In 1948–1949 the Kiel's heirs sold it to Matt and Leda Callan. Guests in the 1950s would often stay several weeks, enjoying the good cooking, swimming pool, croquet, tennis, horseback riding, dancing and other activities. When the main hotel burned down, the Callans sold the resort. In 1991 David Caroll bought the property and restored it as a retreat.

== Sources ==
- Brazzi, Althea (2008), Saratoga Springs, Saratoga Springs Retreat Center & Conference Center
- Durham, David L. (1998). California's Geographic Names: A Gazetteer of Historic and Modern Names of the State. Clovis, California: Word Dancer Press. ISBN 1-884995-14-4.
- From A Fragmentary California Resorts Guide, Saratoga Springs Retreat Center & Conference Center, 1922
- Hamilton, Fletcher (July 1915), "Report of State Mineralogist, 1913–1914", Appendix to the Journals of the Senate and Assembly of the forty-second session of the Legislature of the State of California, vol. VII
- History of Saratoga Springs, Land, and Mineral Waters, Saratoga Springs Retreat Center & Conference Center
- Lundquist, Erica (February 2010), Scotts Creek Watershed Assessment (PDF), Scotts Creek Watershed Council, archived from the original (PDF) on May 11, 2021
- "Saratoga Springs", Geographic Names Information System, United States Geological Survey, United States Department of the Interior
- Waring, Gerald Ashley (1915). Springs of California. U.S. Geological Survey Water Supply Paper. Vol. 338. U.S. Government Printing Office. doi:10.3133/wsp338.
