= Scotts Creek (California) =

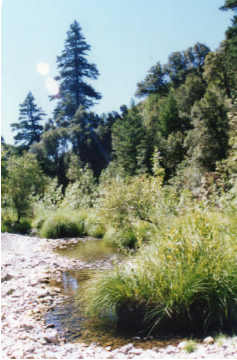
- An unshaded area of upper Scotts Creek

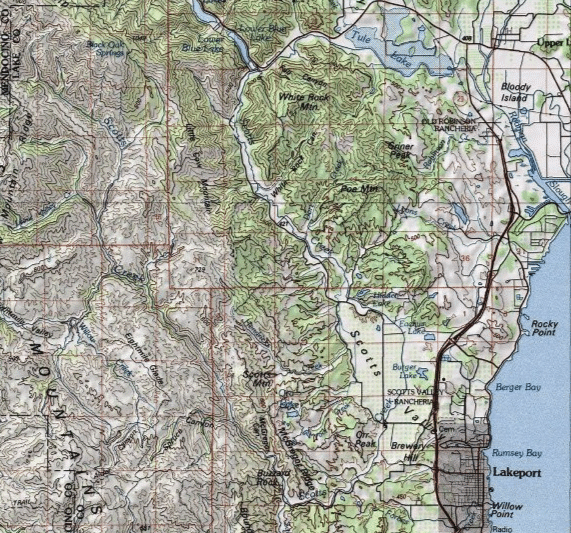
- The creek rises in the NW of the map, flows south, then southeast and then east towards Lakeport, then turns north up to the Blue Lakes, then east through Tule Lake to Rodman Slough

- Location within California Location within the United States

Location
- Country: United States
- State: California
- County: Lake County

Physical characteristics
- Mouth: Rodman Slough
  - coordinates: 39.148176°N 122.913097°W
  - elevation: 1,340 feet (410 m)
- Length: 30 miles (48 km)
- Basin size: 105.5 square miles (273 km^{2})

Basin features
- River system: Clear Lake

Scotts Creek is a stream in Lake County, California, the largest tributary of Clear Lake. It rises to the south of Cow Mountain in the Mayacamas Mountains, then flows southeast towards Clear Lake, running through the fertile Scotts Valley and the seasonal Tule Lake before joining Middle Creek and flowing into the lake via Rodman Slough.

== Hydrology ==
Scotts Creek is 30 miles (48 km) long. It is the largest tributary of Clear Lake, contributing about 24% of the streamflow to the lake with a watershed that covers 23% of the Clear Lake basin. Clear Lake drains to the east via Cache Creek to the Sacramento River.

The course of Scotts Creek resembles a letter "S" with its vertical axis tilted 45° clockwise. The creek forms to the south of Cow Mountain, and then runs southeast to its junction with the creek's South Fork. It turns east and then northeast past Lakeport, then flows northwest through the fertile Scotts Valley up to the outlet from the Blue Lakes. From this point it turns east and flows through Tule Lake towards Upper Lake, then turns southeast and joins Middle Creek. The combined stream flows south through Rodman Slough into Clear Lake. Various man-made barriers block the passage of fish in the river. The total flow is estimated at 115,116 acre⋅ft (141,993,000 m^{3}) per year.

Tule Lake is a seasonal lake that forms in the winter when Scotts Creek overflows its banks. The lake floods every year except when there is a severe drought. It drains along Scotts Creek into Rodman Slough, which flows into Clear Lake. There is only a slight change in elevation along Scotts Creek between the Blue Lakes, Tule Lake and Clear Lake, and the channel is shallow and prone to flooding. Parts of Bachelor Valley may be flooded when Tule Lake backs up and passed through the culverts under highway 20. Tule Lake serves to reduce sedimentation in Clear Lake, because the high flows of Scotts Creek spread out in the lake, slow down and drop their sediment.

== Watershed ==
The Scotts Creek watershed is almost entirely within Lake County, with 0.1% in Mendocino County. It covers 105.5 square miles (273 km^{2}). Elevations range from 3,924 feet (1,196 m) at the top of Cow Mountain down to 1,340 feet (410 m) at its mouth where it joins Middle Creek and forms Rodman Slough. The western part of the watershed is in the Mayacamas Mountains, which divide the Russian River watershed from the Clear Lake watershed. Most of the upper watershed is rugged terrain apart from the small, fairly level Benmore Valley and Eight Mile Valley. The Blue Lakes are two lakes in the northwest of the watershed in a narrow canyon at an elevation of about 1,400 feet (430 m). The lower part of the watershed lies in the fairly level Scotts Valley, Bachelor Valley, and Tule Lake.

The watershed covers the Franciscan Complex, a wide variety of sedimentary rocks scraped up and attached to the advancing North American Plate. Rocks include sandstone, or greywacke, mudstone, greenstone and serpentinite.

Stream	GNIS id	Parent	Mouth			Length	
Stream	GNIS id	Parent	Coords	Elev ft	Elev m	mi	km
Scotts Creek	234664	Rodman Slough	39°09′45″N 122°57′14″W	1,335	407	30	48
←Black Oak Springs Creek	219393	Scotts Creek	39°08′07″N 123°02′25″W	2,037	621	2.5	4.0
←Lyons Valley Creek	227871	Scotts Creek	39°06′57″N 123°02′52″W	1,975	602	1.5	2.4
←Willow Creek	237881	Scotts Creek	39°06′09″N 123°02′35″W	1,827	557	4	6.4
←←Panther Creek	230298	Willow Creek	39°05′21″N 123°03′27″W	2,080	630	2.5	4.0
←South Fork Scotts Creek	235050	Scotts Creek	39°02′30″N 122°58′57″W	1,483	452	7	11
←←Benmore Creek	254604	South Fork Scotts Creek	39°01′21″N 122°58′55″W	1,522	464		
←Pool Creek	230926	Scotts Creek	39°05′27″N 122°57′56″W	1,440	440		
←Hendricks Creek	225171	Scotts Creek	39°06′02″N 122°57′47″W	1,398	426	5.25	8.45
←Dorr Creek	266656	Scotts Creek	39°06′42″N 122°58′38″W	1,381	421	2.25	3.62
←Cooper Creek	233711	Scotts Creek (Tule Lake)	39°10′07″N 122°57′35″W	1,339	408	6	9.7
←←Dayle Creek	233760	Cooper Creek	39°10′31″N 122°57′56″W	1,342	409	4	6.4

== Geological changes ==
Clear Lake formed about 600,000 years ago as the land in the region began to subside when the Clear Lake Volcanic Field erupted. Its basin continues to move downward, while sedimentation keeps it shallow. The Clear Lake basin lies between the watersheds of the Sacramento River and the Russian River. When it was formed it drained east into the Sacramento Valley.

About 200,000 years ago the Clear Lake Volcanic Field blocked the lake's outlet. The lake rose until it found a new outlet, draining west through the Blue Lakes into Cold Creek and the Russian River. Clear Lake was almost 300 feet (91 m) higher than it is today, and Scotts Creek flowed into the lake from the west near where Lakeport is today. It formed a large delta there, which deposited the Lakeport ridge.

At some time in the last 10,000 years a landslide at the west end of the Blue Lakes blocked Clear Lake's outlet to the Russian River watershed. The lake rose again, and created its present outlet via Cache Creek to the Sacramento River. Cache Creek began eroding upstream to Clear Lake, and when it reached the lake the outflow along Cache Creek quickly eroded a channel through soft sediments. The lake dropped almost 300 feet (91 m) as a result.

Scotts Creek eroded through its old delta to carve out Scotts Valley behind the Lakeport Ridge. A landslide to the west of Blue Lakes blocked Scott Creeks and created a lake in Scotts Valley. Eventually the creek broke through to join the Upper Lake drainage to Clear Lake and drained the Scotts Valley lake.

== Human presence ==
Scotts Valley, which slopes to the north with elevations from 1,460 to 1,400 feet (450 to 430 m) is an important agricultural center, and Bachelor Valley, Tule Lake and Benmore Valley are also used for agriculture. California State Route 20 runs across the northern part of the watershed from east to west. There are no towns in the watershed.

European presence in the watershed began when the brothers Salvador Vallejo and Juan Antonio Vallego established a cattle ranch covering a land grant that covered Upper Lake, Bachelor Valley, Scotts Valley, and Big Valley. American farmers started to settle the area after California became a state in 1850. They planted crops such as grains, potatoes, grapes and orchard crops, but because of transportation difficulties relied on cattle and sheep for income. Grazing quickly led to the native perennial bunchgrasses being replaced by an annual grassland with grasses of European origin. Fire was also used to convert brush to grasslands.

Visitors from the San Francisco Bay Area and the Central Valley came for health or to vacation at the mineral springs resorts in Lake County. The Witter Springs resort opened on the west side of Bachelor Valley soon after the springs were discovered in 1870. The Pearson Springs Hotel had opened by 1879, later to become the Saratoga Springs resort. The Blue Lakes Hotel opened in 1870 on the west end of upper Blue Lake where the Pine Acres Resort is today.

Commercial agriculture expanded in the early 1900s as better roads and railways made transport of produce more practical. In 1944 important crops in Scotts Valley included pears, walnuts, hop's and green beans, which were mainly grown in land reclaimed from the former Tule Lake. There were about 800 dairy cows around the Upper Lake and Scotts Valley in 1944. Since then there has been a steady decline in fruit and nut production.

Sedimentation in Clear Lake increased greatly after 1927 due to use of heavy earth-moving equipment to build roads, reclaim wetlands, conduct open-pit mining and mine gravel from the streams. The headwaters of Scotts Creek on South Cow Mountain were severely burned in 2018 by the Mendocino Complex Fire, which may have increased erosion and the flow of sediments and dissolved nutrients into the Clear Lake.

== See also ==
- Rivers of Lake County, California

== Sources ==
- Alpers, Charles, Scotts Creek Nutrient Erosion Study, Lake County, California, USGS California Water Science Center
- Lundquist, Erica (February 2010), Scotts Creek Watershed Assessment (PDF), Scotts Creek Watershed Council, archived from the original (PDF) on 2021-05-11
- Lundquist, Erica (February 2010b), Middle Creek Watershed Assessment (PDF), Middle Creek Coordinated Resource Management and Planning Group, archived from the original (PDF) on 2021-05-17
- Obermeyer, Daniel; Coel, Richard; Sharp, Lon (September 2001), Upper Lake – Nice Area Plan (PDF), County of Lake
- "Scotts Creek", Geographic Names Information System, United States Geological Survey, United States Department of the Interior
- "WT7 - Rodman Slough", Konocti Regional Trails, 2015
