= Horse Mountain (California) =

Mountain in Lake County, California, USA

- Location within California Location within the United States

Highest point
- Elevation: 4,686 ft (1,428 m)
- Prominence: 1,126 ft (343 m)
- Isolation: 9.13 mi (14.69 km) to Peak 4712
- Coordinates: 39°18′24″N 122°58′23″W

Geography
- Country: United States
- State: California
- County: Lake County
- Topo map: Elk Mountain O39122c8 1:24,000

Horse Mountain is a 4,686 ft (1,428 m) high mountain in Lake County, California, United States.

== Location ==
Horse Mountain is in the Northern California Coast Ranges. It is in Mendocino National Forest in Lake County, California. It drains into the Sacramento River. The mountain is to the east of the West Fork of Middle Creek, and west of the Rice Fork of Eel River. It is north of Elk Mountain in the Middle Creek drainage basin northwest of Clear Lake.

== Physical ==
Horse Mountain has an elevation of 4,686 ft (1,428 m), with a clean prominence of 1,126 ft (343 m) and an isolation of 9.13 mi (14.69 km) from the unnamed Peak 4712. This peak in turn has an isolation of 1 mi (1.6 km) from Board Camp Ridge. Horse Mountain is forested, but the summit has been cleared. It is used for recreation by all-terrain vehicles, dirt bikes and hikers.

== Sources ==
- "Horse Mountain", SummitPost
- "Node: Horse Mountain (358798179)", OpenStreetMap
- Peters, William (2004), "Horse Mountain, California", Peakbagger
- Sierra, Marcus (2004), "Peak 4712, California", Peakbagger.com
