= Glenhaven =

Glenhaven may refer to:

- Glenhaven, New South Wales, Australia
- Glenaven, Queensland, Australia formerly known as Glenhaven
- Glenhaven, California, United States
