= Witter Springs, California =

Witter Springs
- Former settlement
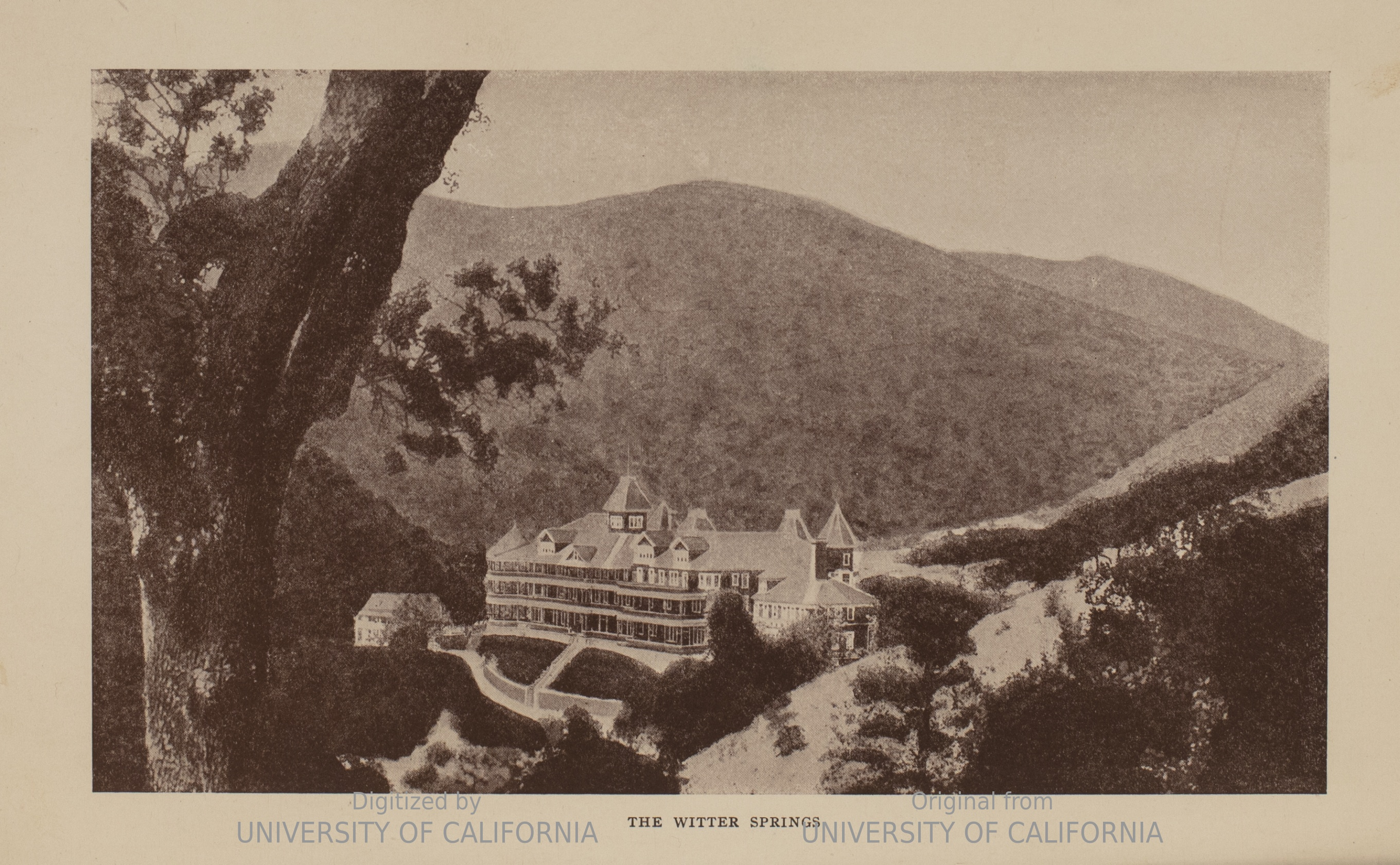
- Witter Springs c. 1916

- Location within California
- Coordinates: 39°11′28″N 122°59′37″W
- Country: United States
- State: California
- County: Lake County
- Elevation: 1,663 ft (507 m)
- Time zone: UTC-8 (PST)
  - Summer (DST): UTC-7 (PDT)
- ZIP code: 95493
- Area code: 707

Witter Springs (formerly Witter's Springs, Witter Medical Springs, and Witter) is a set of springs that was turned into a resort in the 1870s in Lake County, California.

== Location ==
Witter Springs is located 3 miles (4.8 km) northwest of Upper Lake, at an elevation of 1,476 feet (450 m). It is on the west side of Bachelor Valley in the Scotts Creek watershed.

== History ==
The Witter Springs resort opened soon after the springs were discovered in 1870. The Witter's Springs post office operated from 1873 to 1880. The Witter post office opened in 1901, moved and changed its name to Witter Springs in 1913. Water from Witter Medical Springs was bottled and sold to the public circa 1909. The ZIP code for Witter Springs is 95493.

== Reference bibliography ==
- Durham, David L. (1998). California's Geographic Names: A Gazetteer of Historic and Modern Names of the State. Clovis, California: Word Dancer Press. p. 170. ISBN 1-884995-14-4.
- Lundquist, Erica (February 2010), Scotts Creek Watershed Assessment (PDF), Scotts Creek Watershed Council, archived from the original (PDF) on 2021-05-11
- Sanford, Samuel (1911). "Mineral waters". Mineral resources of the United States, 1909: Part II – Nonmetals. Mineral Resources of the United States. Washington, DC: United States Geological Survey. pp. 857–896. doi:10.3133/70175795.
- Waring, Gerald Ashley (1915). Springs of California. U.S. Geological Survey Water Supply Paper. Vol. 338. U.S. Government Printing Office. doi:10.3133/wsp338.
- "Witter Springs", Geographic Names Information System, United States Geological Survey, United States Department of the Interior
