= Rodman Slough =

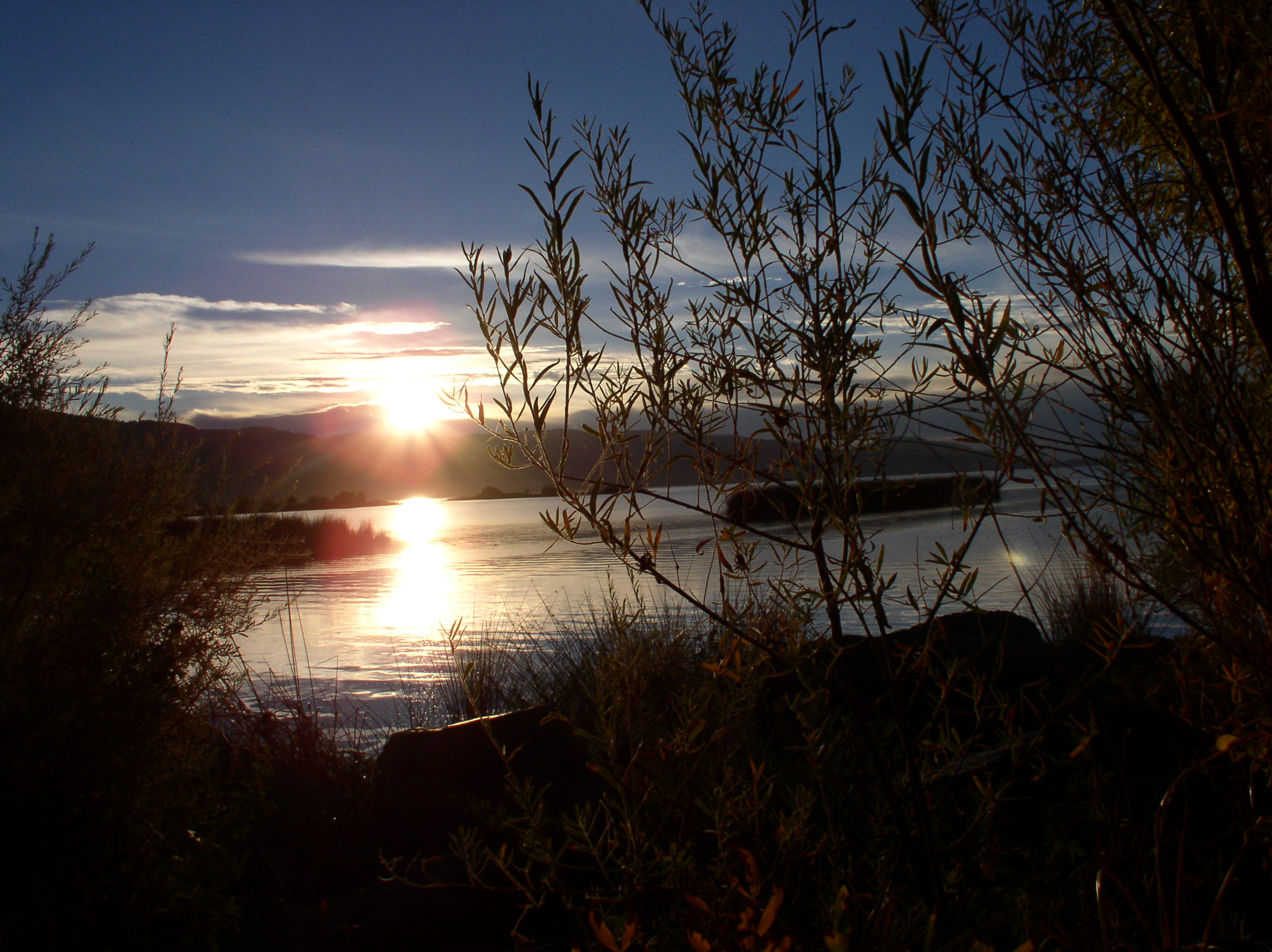
- Rodman Slough 19 January 2011

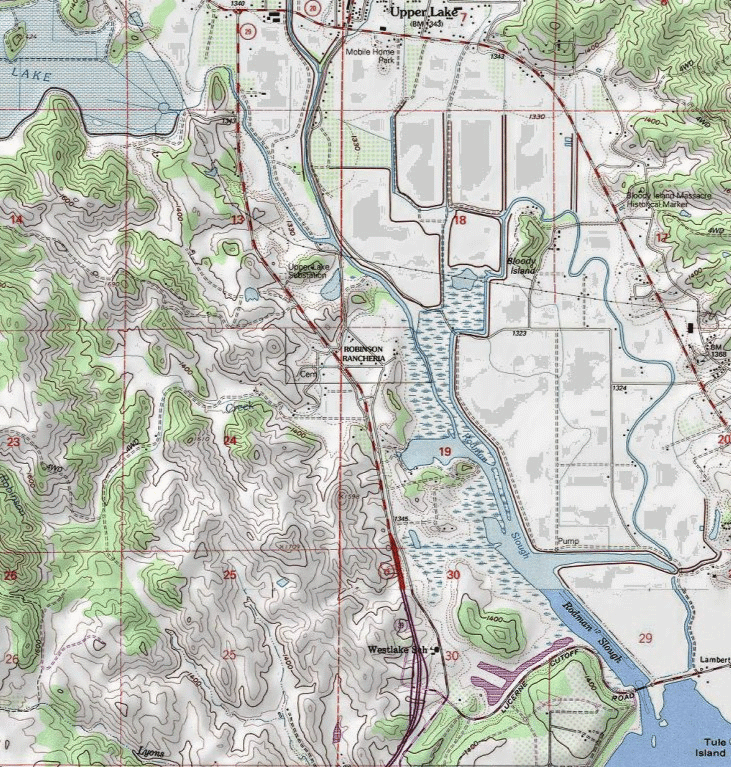
- Rodman Slough. Parts of Tule Lake in NW, Clear Lake in SE corner. Light-colored area beside the slough was once lake / marshland.

- Location within California Location within the United States

Location
- Country: United States
- State: California
- County: Lake County

Physical characteristics
- Source: Scotts Creek and Middle Creek
  - coordinates: 39°08′53″N 122°54′46″W
- Mouth: Clear Lake
  - coordinates: 39°07′00″N 122°53′07″W
  - elevation: 1,325 feet (404 m)

Rodman Slough is a wetland that drains into Clear Lake in Lake County, California. It provides an important habitat for fish, amphibians, birds and other wildlife. It is fed by Scotts Creek and Middle Creek, which contribute about 70% of the sediment and nutrients that cause algae problems in Clear Lake. The slough is the remnant of a much larger area of wetlands and open water that extended from Tule Lake to the northeast through a wide area of land north and east of the present slough that was drained for farmland. Since 1978, there have been proposals to restore large parts of the former wetlands, and much of the funding has been approved, but progress has been slow.

== Location ==
Rodman Slough is at an elevation of 1,325 feet (404 m) in Lake County, California. It flows south for 2.5 miles (4.0 km) into Clear Lake. The Scotts Creek and Middle Creek watersheds feed the slough. They supply about 70% of the sediment and nutrients delivered to Clear Lake, which cause the algae population to increase in the lake. During periods of heavy runoff, the two creeks raise the level of the slough and the water moves at significant speed. Fine sediments are carried into Clear Lake, while coarse sediments are gradually filling in the slough. The high flows also erode the levees that protect adjacent reclaimed farmland.

Stream	GNIS id	Parent	Mouth			Length	
Stream	GNIS id	Parent	Coords	Elev ft	Elev m	mi	km
Rodman Slough	267193	Clear Lake	39°07′35″N 122°53′55″W	1,325	404	2.5	4.0
←Scotts Creek	234664	Rodman Slough	39°09′45″N 122°57′14″W	1,335	407	30	48
←Robinson Creek	234576	Rodman Slough	39°08′41″N 122°54′28″W	1,332	406	4	6.4
←Middle Creek (Rodman Slough)	234282	Rodman Slough	39°08′54″N 122°54′45″W	1,329	405	8.5	13.7

== Environment ==
Tule Lake is a seasonal lake that forms in the winter when Scotts Creek overflows its banks. It drains along Scotts Creek into Rodman Slough, The Tule Lake / Rodman Slough area is an important stopover for migratory songbirds and supports cover for many waterfowl and water birds. The Rodman Slough wetland areas and the oak woodlands that surround them have a large rookery of great blue heron (Ardea herodias), where migrating birds congregate in the fall. Other birds include American white pelican (Pelecanus erythrorhynchos), Canada goose (Branta canadensis), cormorant (Phalacrocoracidae), heron and egret (Ardeidae) and grebe (Podicipediformes). The slough is an important breeding and nursery area for fish species such as black bass (Micropterus), black crappie (Pomoxis nigromaculatus), white crappie (Pomoxis annularis) and catfish.

== History ==
In the past, the Scotts and Middle creeks flowed through Robinson Lake, also called Rodman Bay, before entering Clear Lake. Robinson Lake was a mosaic of shallow wetlands, meandering channels, riparian forest and open water. Bloody island was historically an upland island in Robinson Lake surrounded by a complex of seasonal and perennial wetland. The island was the site of the 1850 Bloody Island Massacre in response to a Pomo revolt from slavery.

Between 1918 and 1933, farmers built levees in Robinson Lake and the area was drained for agriculture, leaving only the narrow Rodman Slough along the west of the former lake. The heavy earth-moving equipment used to "reclaim" about 2,000 acres (810 ha) of wetland was one of the causes of a surge in sedimentation in Clear Lake after 1927.

In 1955, Congressman Hubert B. Scudder introduced a bill, which was authorized, for flood control works on Middle Creek at an estimated Federal cost of $1,110,000 and Non-Federal Cost of $790,000. At this time, the community of Upper Lake was partially flooded three times a year, and almost all the town was flooded every ten years. In 1966, the United States Army Corps of Engineers (USACE) completed levees on the north side of Scotts Creek between Tule Lake and the mouth of Rodman Slough as part of the Middle Creek Flood Control project. The levees were intended to reduce the risk of flooding urban communities and agricultural areas.

In 1978, the Federal Emergency Management Agency (FEMA) determined that much of the area covered by the flood control project was in the 100-year floodplain of Clear Lake. Restoring the area to its natural state would reduce costs of maintaining old levees and drainage pumps, and reduce or eliminate the cost of fighting floods in high water years.

The levees are substandard and have settled, and are as little as 10.5 feet (3.2 m) above the lowest normal Clear Lake water level. In the past (1890), the Clear Lake water level has risen to 13.66 feet (4.16 m) above this lowest level. There is a very real risk that the levees will be submerged by the type of flood expected at least once every century. The Robinson Lake area was evacuated due to flood threats in 1983, 1986 and 1998. In 1995, Scotts Creek overtopped the levee, flooding parts of Highway 20.

In 2004, the Fish and Game Commission designated the Clear Lake Wildlife Area, a 97-acre (39 ha) wildlife area extending to the east of the slough in which visitors could engage in birdwatching, seasonal fishing, wildlife viewing and hunting. It included oak-covered hills, dense tule marsh and an extensive riparian habitat. It supports herons, red-tailed hawks, osprey, songbirds, waterfowl, deer, gray fox, bobcat, and coyote.

== Restoration projects ==
Proposals were made by the California Department of Fish and Game (DFG; now the California Department of Fish and Wildlife) and United States Army Corps of Engineers to restore wetlands of Tule Lake and the adjacent Rodman Slough Reclamation Area.

The Middle Creek Restoration Project plans to remove 3 miles (4.8 km) of substandard levees. This will restore 1,400 acres (570 ha) of wetlands and open water, and will improve water quality in Clear Lake. In 2004 the Lake County water district signed a contract with the USACE to breach some of the levees and restore the former Robinson Lake. The Army Corps would cover 65% of the costs, but the water district had to compensate over 60 private property owners, raise a section of California State Route 20, reinforce seven PG&E power line pylons and replace a bridge on the Nice-Lucerne Cutoff. The water district moved slowly, and took 14 years to spend $12 million of funding that had been supplied by the state.

In 2008 the DFG issued a draft Conceptual Area Protection Plan for the Clear Lake Wildlife Area. The expanded wildlife area would now cover about 3,225 acres (1,305 ha) including a large part of Tule Lake, the Middle Creek Restoration Project, additional land to the south of this project, and DFG lands and Land Trust lands south of Rodman Slough. Over half the area would be wetland habitat, with the remainder being riparian, open water and oak woodland. The area would conserve and create natural habitat in one of the few relatively natural areas around Clear Lake. It may be valuable to sensitive species such as the Western pond turtle (Actinemys marmorata), foothill yellow-legged frog (Rana boylii), California red-legged frog (Rana draytonii), tricolored blackbird (Agelaius tricolor), double-crested cormorant (Phalacrocorax auritus), osprey (Pandion haliaetus) and bald eagle (Haliaeetus leucocephalus).

In June 2019 the Lake County Watershed Protection District accepted $15 million from the California Department of Water Resources to purchase and maintain properties affected by the ongoing Middle Creek Flood Damage Reduction and Ecosystem Restoration Project. The project would remove failing levees and restore water coverage to about 1,600 acres (650 ha) of reclaimed farmland. It would provide an area to the north, well away from the lake, where the water would slow down and drop its sediment. It would avert a breach further south, which would release far more sediment and nutrients into the lake. The state's total contribution would be almost $28 million.

== See also ==
- Rivers of Lake County, California

== Sources ==
- "Appendix A Engineering Appendix", Middle Creek, Lake County, Flood Damage Reduction and Ecosystem Restoration, 2002
- Clear Lake Wildlife Area, California Department of Fish and Wildlife
- Larson, Elizabeth (14 June 2019), "Supervisors approve $15 million contract with state for Middle Creek Restoration Project", Lake County News
- Lundquist, Erica (February 2010), Scotts Creek Watershed Assessment (PDF), Scotts Creek Watershed Council, archived from the original (PDF) on 2021-05-11
- "Rodman Slough", Geographic Names Information System, United States Geological Survey, United States Department of the Interior
- Scudder, Hubert B. (1955), "Middle Creek Flood-Control Project", Public Works Appropriations for 1956: Hearings ... 84th Congress, 1st Session.; Western Section, United States. Congress. House. Appropriations
- "WT7 - Rodman Slough", Konocti Regional Trails, 2015
