= Blue Lakes, California =

Blue Lakes, California may refer to:

- Blue Lakes (California), a string of lakes in Lake County, California
- Blue Lake, California, a city in Humboldt County, California
- Midlakes, California, a settlement in Lake County, California, formerly known as Blue Lakes
