= Hopitsewah, California =

Hopitsewah, or Sacred Town is a former Pomo settlement in Lake County, California, United States. It was the largest located on the west side of Upper Lake; its precise location is unknown.

It was visited by Joseph Warren Revere in the mid-1840s; Revere reported it to be the largest of the settlements on Clear Lake, with enclosed and cultivated lands.
