= Elk Mountain (California) =

Mountain in California

- Location within California Location within the United States

Highest point
- Elevation: 4,191 ft (1,277 m)
- Prominence: 599 ft (183 m)
- Isolation: 1.69 mi (2.72 km) to Horse Mountain
- Coordinates: 39°16′56″N 122°56′11″W

Geography
- Country: United States
- State: California
- County: Lake County
- Topo map: Elk Mountain O39122c8 1:24,000

Elk Mountain is a 4,191-foot-high (1,277 m) mountain in Lake County, California, United States.

== Physical ==
Elk Mountain is in the Northern California Coast Ranges. It has an elevation of 4,191 ft (1,277 m), with a clean prominence of 599 ft (183 m) and an isolation of 1.69 mi (2.72 km) from Horse Mountain. It is in Mendocino National Forest in Lake County, California. It drains into the Sacramento River. The mountain is to the north of the point where the east and west forks of Middle Creek converge.

== Elk Mountain Road ==
Elk Mountain is about 10 mi (16 km) north of Upper Lake, California. Elk Mountain Road runs from Upper Lake north to Lake Pillsbury on Eel River. It passes about 1 km (0.62 mi) to the east of Elk Mountain. The Elk Mountain Road (National Forest Route M1) is a dirt road that is the main access route into the Mendocino National Forest.

== Recreation ==
Elk Mountain is used for hang-gliding and paragliding. The launch site is reached by a rough and steep dirt road about 1 mi (1.6 km) long. The primary landing zone is in the Middle Creek Campground.

== Sources ==
- "Elk Mountain", Geographic Names Information System, United States Geological Survey, United States Department of the Interior
- "Elk Mountain Road to Lake Pilsbury", bivy
- "Elk Mountain", Zephyr Paragliding
- "Node: Elk Mountain (358797701)", OpenStreetMap
- Peters, William (2004), "Elk Mountain, California", Peakbagger
