= Tule Lake (Lake County, California) =

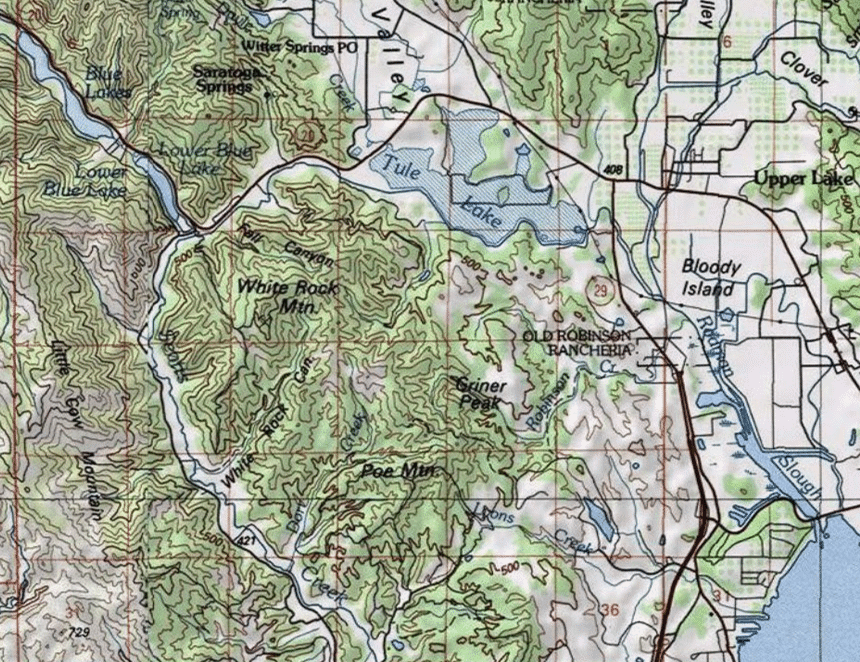
- Location of Tule Lake. Blue Lakes to the NW, Rodman Slough to the SE

- Location within California Location within the United States
- Location: Lake County, California
- Coordinates: 39.160206°N 122.945159°W
- Type: Lake
- Primary inflows: Scotts Creek
- Primary outflows: Scotts Creek
- Basin countries: United States

Tule Lake (/ˈtuːliː/ TOO-lee) is a seasonal lake in Lake County, California. It is named after the edible bullrushes, or tules, that used to surround the lake. These have been cleared and the lake partly drained to support agriculture, but it still floods every winter. In summer it is used for growing wild rice and grazing cattle. There have been proposals to restore the lake to its original wetlands condition.

== Location ==
Tule Lake is in Lake County, California at an elevation of 1,335 feet (407 m). The lake is bordered by Scotts Creek, which defines its south shore, and California State Route 20 to the north. The lake is named after the plentiful tules that used to grow around it. (Note: Tules are a valuable source of food. Young shoots can be peeled and eaten raw or boiled. Young shoots and roots can be roast or sliced and fried. Bruised young roots can be boiled down to produce sweet syrup. Flour can be made from the older tule roots by peeling and cutting them up, crushing, boiling, removing any fiber and drying. The seeds may be dried and mixed with the flour.)

== Hydrology ==
Tule Lake is a seasonal lake that forms in the winter when Scotts Creek overflows its banks. The lake floods every year except when there is a severe drought. It drains along Scotts Creek into Rodman Slough, which flows into Clear Lake. There is only a slight change in elevation along Scotts Creek between Blue Lakes, Tule Lake and Clear Lake, and the channel is shallow and prone to flooding. Parts of Bachelor Valley may be flooded when Tule Lake backs up and passed through the culverts under Highway 20. Tule Lake serves to reduce sedimentation in Clear Lake, because the high flows of Scotts Creek spread out in the lake, slow down and drop their sediment.

== History ==
The Yima, a group comprising both Northern Pomo and Eastern Pomo, used to live in the area containing Scotts Valley, Blue Lakes, Tule Lake and extended to Clear Lake. They used to camp along the lakeshore during the root-digging season.

Tule Lake has deep alluvial soils and silty clay loam, suitable for field crops. In 1891 European settlers began growing and canning string beans near Tule Lake. Henry Wambold, who built the Laurel Dell Hotel, built a string bean cannery in 1891. In 1899 production of string beans was increased, and efforts began to drain parts of Tule Lake for farm use. Wambold "reclaimed the land known as Tule Lake, by draining the land, turning the soil, raking the tule roots from the soil and hauling them away." The cannery was later operated by the Lake County Canning Company. In 1944 and 1950 the green beans, mainly grown in the Tule Lake reclamation area, were an important crop in the region.

Tule Lake continues to be used in summer for growing wild rice and grazing cattle. In winter the lake is used as a wintering area by bald eagles, and as a stopover for waterfowl and water birds. There have been proposals by the California Department of Fish and Game (DFG) and United States Army Corps of Engineers (USACE) to restore wetlands of Tule Lake and the adjacent Rodman Slough Reclamation Area.

== See also ==
- Tule Lake National Monument
- Tule Lake National Wildlife Refuge

== Sources ==
- Elias, Thomas S.; Dykeman, Peter A. (2009), Edible Wild Plants: A North American Field Guide to Over 200 Natural Foods, Sterling Publishing Company, Inc., ISBN 978-1-4027-6715-9
- Lundquist, Erica (February 2010), Scotts Creek Watershed Assessment (PDF), Scotts Creek Watershed Council
- Obermeyer, Daniel; Coel, Richard; Sharp, Lon (September 2001), Upper Lake – Nice Area Plan (PDF), County of Lake
- "WT7 - Rodman Slough", Konocti Regional Trails, 2015
- "Tule Lake", Geographic Names Information System, United States Geological Survey, United States Department of the Interior
- Tule Lake map, USGS
