= Clear Lake (California) =

Freshwater lake in California

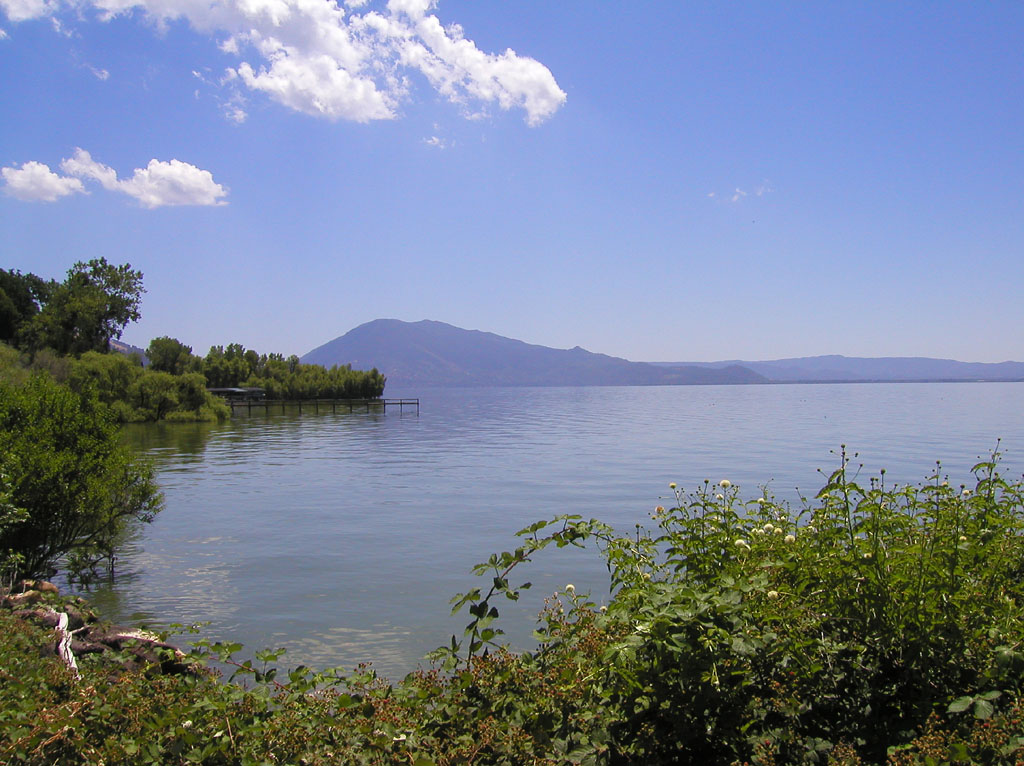

- Location within California Location within the United States
- Location: Lake County, California
- Coordinates: 39.0616°N 122.8272°W
- Lake type: Eutrophic/hypereutrophic
- Primary inflows: Scotts Creek; Middle Creek; Forbes Creek; Morrison Creek; Seigler Canyon Creek; Shindler Creek; Kelsey Creek; Adobe Creek; Manning Creek
- Primary outflows: Cache Creek
- Basin countries: United States
- Max. length: 19 mi (31 km)
- Max. width: 8 mi (13 km)
- Surface area: 68 sq mi (180 km^{2})
- Average depth: 27 ft (8.2 m)
- Max. depth: 60 ft (18 m)
- Water volume: 1,155,000 acre⋅ft (1,425,000 dam^{3})
- Shore length^{1}: 100 mi (160 km)
- Surface elevation: 1,329 ft (405 m)
- Islands: Anderson Island; Dollar Island; Fruit Island; Garner Island; Indian Island; Monitor Island; Rattlesnake Island; Slater Island; Stubbs Island; Tule Island; Weekend Island
- Settlements: Clearlake, California; Clearlake Oaks, California; Finley, California; Glenhaven, California; Kelseyville, California; Lakeport, California; Lower Lake, California; Lucerne, California; Middletown, California; Nice, California; Upper Lake, California
- ^{1} Shore length is not a well-defined measure.

Clear Lake is a natural freshwater lake in Lake County in the U.S. state of California, north of Napa County and San Francisco. It is the largest natural freshwater lake wholly within the state, with 68 square miles (180 km^{2}) of surface area. (Lake Tahoe is partially in Nevada.) It has an age of nearly 500,000 years. It is the latest lake to occupy a site with a history of lakes stretching back at least 2,500,000 years.

Clear Lake supports large populations of largemouth bass, crappie, bluegill, carp and catfish. Two-thirds of the fish caught in Clear Lake are largemouth bass, with a record of 17.52 pounds (7.95 kg). In addition to fish, there is abundant wildlife within the Clear Lake basin. There are year-round populations of ducks, pelicans, grebes, blue herons, egrets, osprey, and bald eagles, and the basin supports sizable populations of deer, bear, mountain lion, raccoon and other animals.

The expansive, semi-warm water of Clear Lake makes it popular for watersports, such as swimming, water skiing, wakeboarding, sailing, boat races, and jet skiing.

== Nomenclature ==
Hok-has-ha, Ka-ba-tin, and Lupiyoma are the original names given to Clear Lake by the indigenous people of the region, the Pomo, Lake Miwok and Wappo. In the early 19th century, European American settlers referred to the lake as "Big Lake" or "Laguna", before finally adopting Clear Lake by the mid-19th century.

== Hydrology ==
Clear Lake is 19 mi (31 km) by 8 mi (13 km) at its widest point, with a surface area of 43,785 acres (17,719 ha) and a 1,155,000 acre⋅ft (1,425,000 dam^{3}) capacity. Average depth is 27 ft (8.2 m), maximum is 60 ft (18 m), lake elevation is 1,329 ft (405 m), and average water temperature is 40 °F (4 °C) in winter and 76 °F (24 °C) in summer.

The Clear Lake Watershed is contained within the Upper Cache Creek USGS hydrologic unit, an area that encompasses roughly 425 mi^{2} (1,100 km^{2}). The drainage basin is 458 square miles (1,190 km^{2}) (526 square miles (1,360 km^{2}) including the lake), which is large compared to the lake's 68 square miles (180 km^{2}). The surface area of the lake is divided into three arms: the Upper Arm, the Oaks Arm and the Lower Arm. Cache Creek, the only outlet for the lake, originates from the Lower Arm. Cache Creek has two major tributaries: North Fork Cache Creek and Bear Creek. The Upper Arm is the largest of the three arms and receives 75% of drainage from the watershed. Rodman Slough, contained within the Upper Arm, receives drainage to its marsh from Scotts Creek and Middle Creek, the largest tributaries to Clear Lake as well as Kelsey Creek, which enters from Big Valley. Erosion and sedimentation are key environmental concerns in the Clear Lake region. Seventy percent of the terrain has very shallow topsoil, which saturates after a rainfall of 3 to 4 inches (76 to 102 mm), after which runoff flows quickly into the lake. The maximum flow from the lake is determined by the narrow canyon of Cache Creek, not by the dam. The combination of rapid inflow and slow outflow results in frequent flooding of low-elevation areas such as downtown Clearlake and Lakeport.

== Geology ==
Clear Lake is believed to be one of the oldest lakes in North America.The lake sits on a huge block of rock which slowly tilts northward at the same rate as the lake fills in with sediment, thus keeping the water at roughly the same depth. Core samples of the lake's sediments, taken by U.S. Geological Survey geologists in 1973 and 1980, indicate that the lake is at least 480,000 years old.

At one time Clear Lake was even bigger than it is now, and included the Blue Lakes (to the northwest of Clear Lake). Volcanic eruptions and subsequent landslides changed the landscape dramatically, forever separating Clear Lake from the Blue Lakes and from its former westward drainage into the Russian River.

Clear Lake lies within the Clear Lake Volcanic Field, as designated by the United States Geological Survey. The volcanic field contains The Geysers, a steam field which powers a network of the world's most productive geothermal power plants. There are numerous small faults present in the south end of the lake as well as many volcanoes, ranging in age from 10,000 to 2.1 million years, the largest being Mount Konocti, sitting at the middle of the lake's south shore. There have been no eruptions from the Clear Lake Volcanic Field for thousands of years, but there are indicators currently being monitored that suggest there is the potential for future eruptions. These indicators include volcanic-type earthquakes, hot spring activity and seepage of volcanic gas.

=== Weather ===
It is not uncommon for temperatures in the summer to rise into the triple digits, or fall below freezing in the winter. Occasional summer thunderstorms occur but are not common. Snow can fall to lake level but accumulation is rare. Snow on the surrounding mountains is common.

The average high temperature is 92 °F (33 °C) in summer, and the average low is 32 °F (0 °C) in winter. Normally, July is the hottest month and December the coldest. December and January are the wettest months, with an average of 5.95 and 6.45 inches (151 and 164 mm) of rain per month, respectively.

== Recreation ==
With over 100 miles (160 km) of shoreline, Clear Lake is a popular spot for water-sports enthusiasts. According to the California Water Board, Clear Lake sees 15,000 recreational boaters per year. There are 11 free boat launch ramps around the lake that are open to the public. Individuals may rent boats and personal watercraft from many businesses around the lake.

Clear Lake is sometimes called the "Bass Capital of the West." Largemouth bass, which are farmed and planted in the lake by California Department of Fish and Wildlife, crappie, catfish, bluegill, and rainbow trout can be found in the county's lakes. Fishing boats can be rented, and many stores and facilities around the lake specialize in fishing equipment. Numerous fishing tournaments and derbies are held throughout the year. In 2016, Clear Lake was ranked by Bassmaster Magazine as the #3 best bass lake in the United States and the #1 best bass lake on the West Coast.

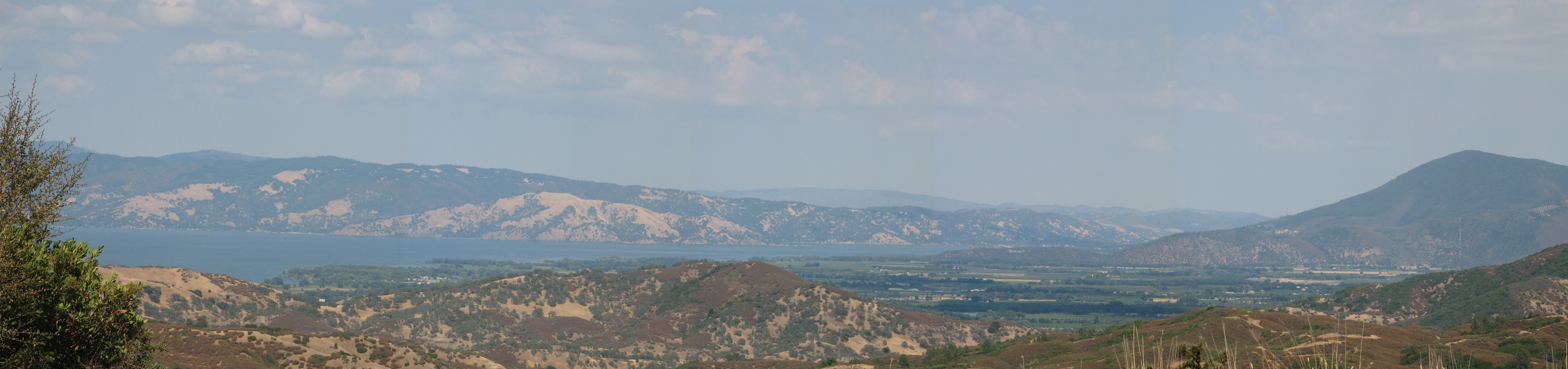
View of Clear Lake and Mount Konocti from CA Highway 175

All boaters entering Lake County are warned that Dreissenid mussels, also known as quagga and zebra mussels, are a great threat to Clear Lake. By law, boats are required to be inspected before launching, and must have a Lake County Quagga/Zebra (QZ) Sticker on the watercraft. Shops in the vicinity carry out the inspection. At every entry to Lake County, signs warn boaters not to spread hydrilla in the county's bodies of water. Extensive management efforts have controlled the presence of hydrilla in Clear Lake, although it may return at any time.

The lake is also the site of an annual "splash-in", the "oldest and largest seaplane gathering in the Western United States".

The California Office of Environmental Health Hazard Assessment released an advisory statement regarding eating fish caught from the lake, based on the mercury level.

== Wildlife and vegetation ==
The Clear Lake basin attracts large quantities of waterfowl, including mallards, western grebe, coots, various species of geese, ospreys, plovers, mergansers and many others. Wild turkeys, blacktail deer, gray squirrels, ground squirrels, skunks, river otter, raccoon, mink, and muskrat. There have been occasional sightings of mountain lion and ringtail. Opossums, red-tailed hawks, turkey vultures, and other species are also common. The endangered northern spotted owl is seen occasionally. Common reptiles and amphibians include the northwestern pond turtle, California king snake, Pacific gopher snake, garter snakes, northern pacific rattlesnake, common bullfrog and the rare California giant salamander among many others. Much of the shoreline is developed, but parks, reserves, miles of open water and private land also exist allowing many opportunities for observing and enjoying nature. The county also hosts a growing population of the rare tule elk, recently reintroduced after being locally hunted to extinction one hundred years before. A large colony of bald eagles is found in the Cache Creek canyon.

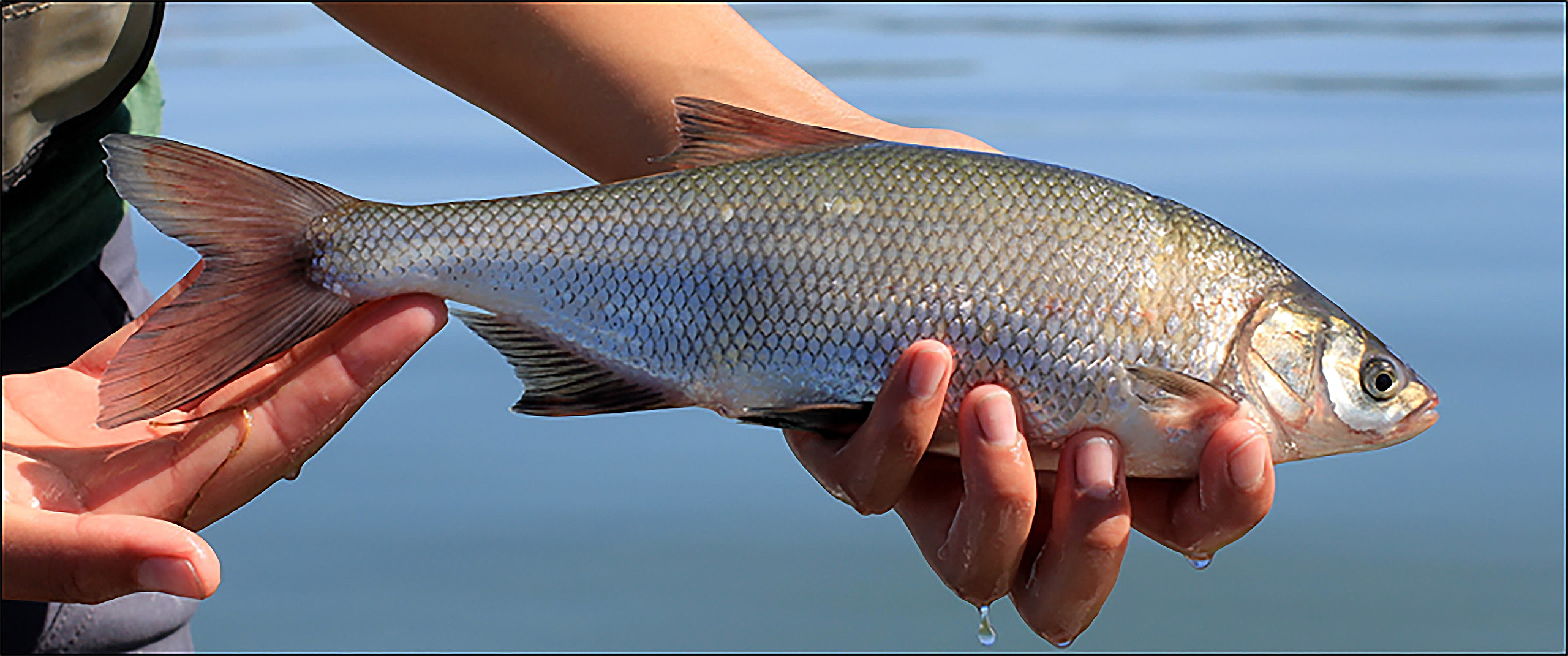
Close-up image of Clear Lake hitch. By USGS.

In addition to the native Clear Lake hitch (called chi by the native Pomo), the lake hosts channel catfish, white catfish, brown bullhead, crappie (both black and white species), and other native fish species, as well as Florida strain largemouth bass and carp placed by the Department of Fish and Wildlife for sporting purposes. Along the shoreline and creeks, there are aquatic growths of tule, cattail, willow, cottonwood, box elder, and many other types of riparian plant life.

The streams feeding Clear lake contain Sacramento pikeminnow, California roach, and rainbow trout. Pacific lamprey are present in at least one stream, Kelsey Creek. Prior to the construction of a dam on the outlet of Clear Lake, both steelhead and Pacific lamprey ascended Cache creek to spawn in Clear Lake's tributaries. As of March 2024, farming operations along the Big Valley Groundwater Basin watershed have been ordered to report of their water use by the California State Water Resources Control Board in order to study the effect of groundwater pumping and water diversions on the Clear Lake hitch spawning and migration.

Clear Lake is well known among entomologists for the Clear Lake gnat (Chaoborus astictopus) and historical control efforts. This species of "phantom midge" (so called because the larvae are transparent and very difficult to see) measures less than 1/4 inch (6.4 mm) long and resembles a tiny mosquito, but is non-biting. Clear Lake gnat hatches start anytime from March through June, depending on weather. Before pesticide use began in the 1940s, the gnat was so abundant around the lake in the summer that large piles of dead gnats appeared beneath streetlights, looking like dirty snow. The gnat swarms were so thick that people driving along the edge of the lake reported stopping every 1/4 mile (0.40 km) to clean the insects off the windshields and headlights of their cars so they could see, and pedestrians tied kerchiefs over their faces to avoid inhaling the gnats.

The rugged coastal mountains surrounding Clear Lake are covered with thick stands of oak-madrone forest, manzanita, sage shrubs, chaparral, and grasses. Most common trees include blue oak, valley oak, interior live oak, Pacific madrone, California scrub oak, plus very occasional coast redwoods and tanoak. Large stands of western white pine may be seen in the higher elevations. The heavy forestation and ruggedness of this part of California has helped prevent wholesale real estate development or farming. On the northeast slope of Mount Konocti is a heavily forested area known locally as the "Black Forest" because it never gets direct sunshine. This area has some Douglas fir in very heavy stands.

== History ==
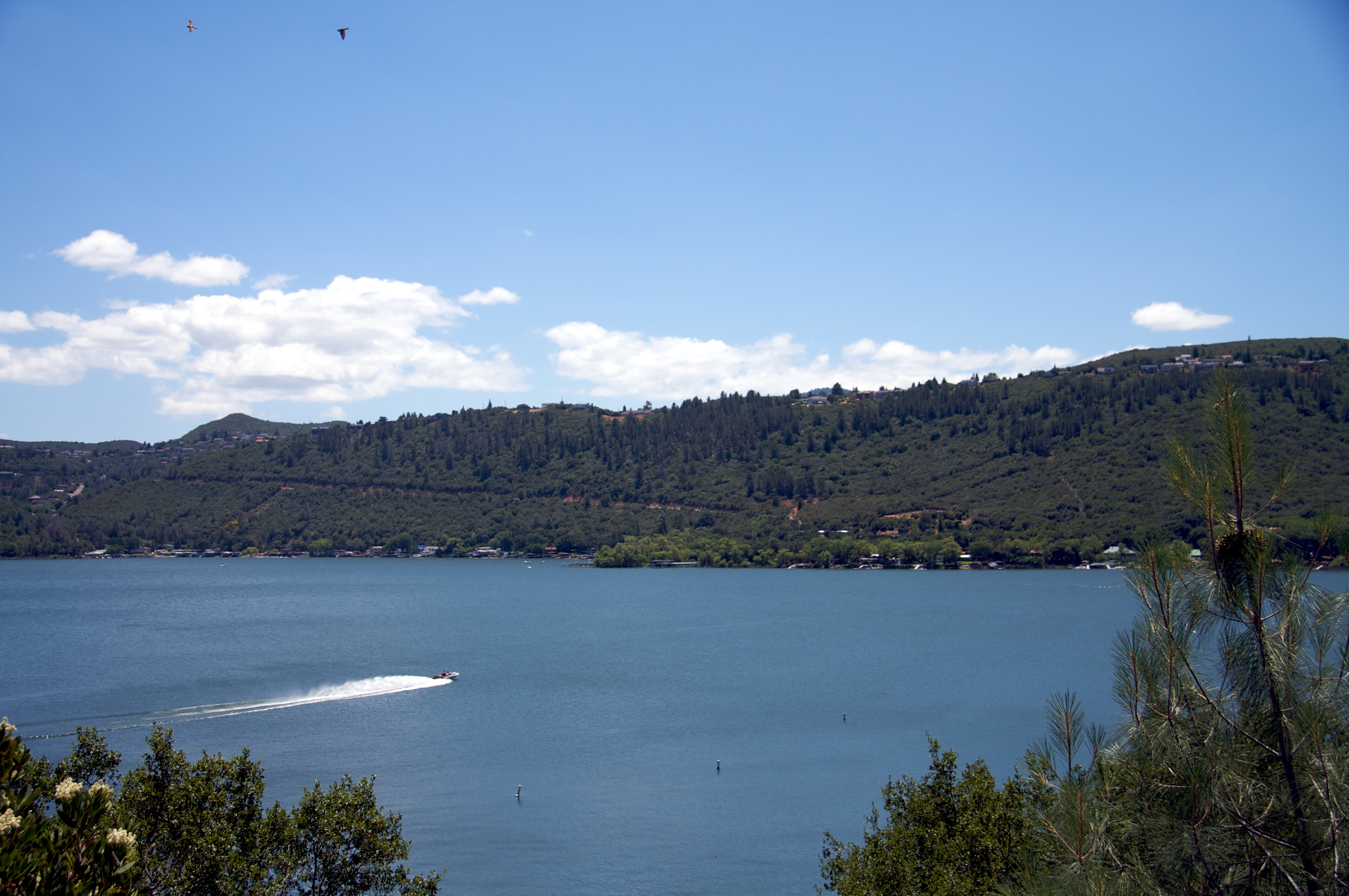
Clear Lake

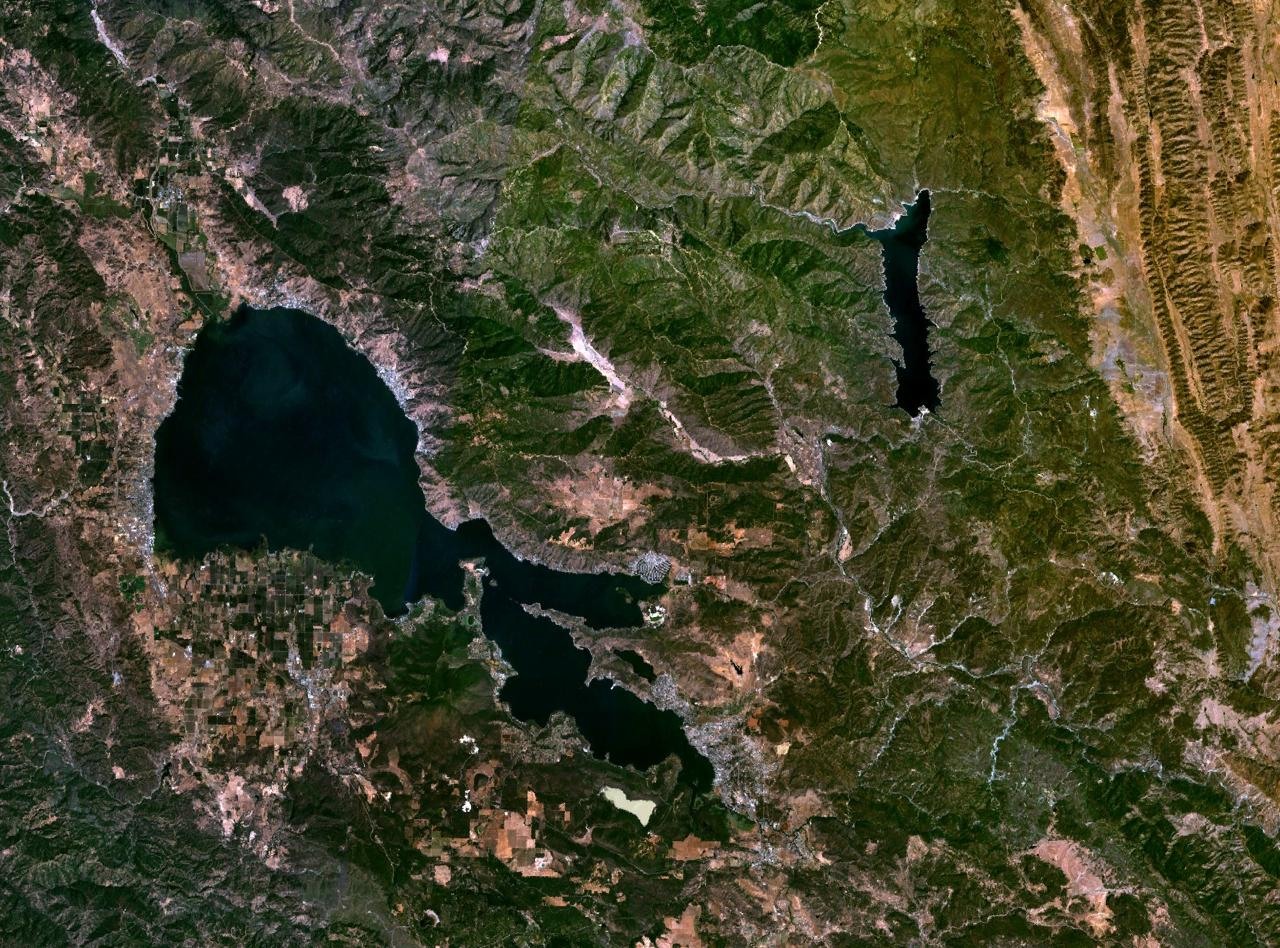
Satellite photo of Clear Lake (the larger lake to the west) and Indian Valley Reservoir

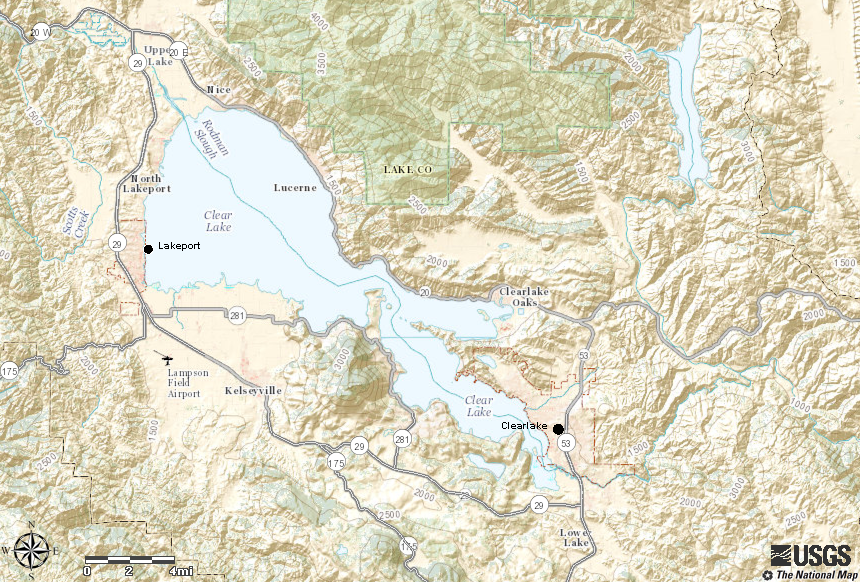
Topographic map of Clear Lake and Indian Valley Reservoir

Archaeologists believe that the Clear Lake basin has been occupied by Native Americans for at least 11,000 years. (See: Post Pattern.) Evidence of this has been found at nearby Borax Lake and on Rattlesnake Island in the lake's south arm. Abundant fish, game and waterbirds made Clear Lake an oasis in the otherwise harsh conditions of Northern California's mountains. The native Clear Lake Hitch (Lavinia exilicauda) was once so abundant that millions of hitch clogged the lake's feeder streams in dry months. When the Spanish missionaries came to California, they found that thousands of Native Americans lived in the Clear Lake Basin, primarily Pomo, Yuki, and Wappo with some Lake Miwok.

European settlers arrived starting around 1845. Frequently they abused and exploited the native Pomo people. A number of Pomo were enslaved and abused by settlers, notably Andrew Kelsey (whose name is attached to the town of Kelseyville) and Charles Stone. The Pomo eventually revolted and killed Kelsey and Stone in 1849. The following year, a United States Army contingent under Lieutenant Nathaniel Lyon cornered as many as 200 Pomo on an island in Clear Lake and slaughtered most of them—including scores of women and children. The historical marker for the Bloody Island massacre is on Highway 20 between Upper Lake and the Robinson Rancheria. The Pomo were later forced to live in small rancherias set aside by the federal government.

Fish culturist Livingston Stone observed the lake in January 1873, and wrote that "the water of Clear Lake is never clear".

Clear Lake was one of the potential water supplies considered in the 1870s by the city of San Francisco, along with Blue Lakes in Alpine County, Lake Merced, Calaveras Valley, Spring Valley Water Works, and Pescadero Creek. The Clear Lake Water Works Company would have built a dam at the current location of the existing one, and piped water through a system of tunnels, canals and reservoirs to the San Pablo Bay. The surveyors reported that the lake's "water has a peaty and rather unpleasant flavor", and that "the condition of the water differed in the upper and lower portions of the lake", noting "dead fish floating here and there".

Clear Lake was used as an outlying seaplane base for Alameda Naval Air Station during World War II and the early years of the Cold War. Flying boats could land on Clear Lake when conditions were unsafe on San Francisco Bay.

In 1977, Proteus Inc, a Berkeley-based company that would eventually become Earthrise Nutritionals, contacted the Clear Lake Algae Research Unit (CLARU), an initiative resulting from the collaboration of the county's Flood Control and Water Conservation District and the California Department of Water Resources. The company expressed interest in the "possibility of harvesting the county's algae for sale in specialty markets in Europe and Japan". The project didn't materialize, as harvesting spirulina, the cyanobacteria genus the company was interested in, didn't prove economical nor reliable. The company opted instead for algae farming. The Clear Lake Algae Research Unit was disbanded in October 1978 for lack of funding, eight years after its start.

== Water rights ==
DeWitt Clinton Rumsey, previously a cattle drive "Captain" (and after whom the town of Rumsey in Yolo County was named), was one of the first to record the water levels of Clear Lake. Its level was originally controlled by a rocky ledge in Cache Creek called the "Grigsby Riffle" (which is now submerged upstream of the 1914 dam). In 1872 Rumsey installed a gauge in Lakeport to record the water level. He defined the level when the lake ceased to flow over the ledge as "zero feet Rumsey," which corresponds to an elevation of 1,318.26 feet (401.81 m). The reading is referred to as being "on the Rumsey Gauge" or "(x) feet Rumsey," which can fall below zero due to evaporation (over 3 feet (91 cm) a year) and pumping of water. The highest recorded level is (13.66 feet (4.16 m) in 1890, and the lowest is −3.50 feet (−107 cm) in 1920. In 1991 a court ruled that the official low water mark (which determines property ownership) is zero feet Rumsey. The Rumsey gauge, now automated, is still in operation.

Yolo County acquired riparian rights to Cache Creek's water in 1855, and after gaining water storage rights in 1912, they built the Cache Creek dam. Water companies which rely on the lake have to pay Yolo County for their water. The Gopcevic (1920) and Bemmerly (1942) Decrees prohibited the modification of the Grigsby Riffle, set the normal maximum level of 7.56 feet (2.30 m) Rumsey, and required Yolo to keep the level below 9 feet (2.7 m) except for limited times during floods. Yolo was entitled to use all the water down to zero feet. The Solano Decree (1978,1995) limited the amount of water Yolo could use: if the lake is "full" on May 1—at 7.56 feet (2.30 m) Rumsey—then they can draw 150,000 acre-feet, equivalent to a drop in the lake level of about 3.5 feet (1.1 m). If the level on May 1 is below 3.22 feet (0.98 m) they can draw none, with a proportional amount for other levels. They must stop on October 31, or if the level falls to one foot (30 cm). In compensation, the Indian Valley Reservoir, also entirely in Lake County, was constructed in 1975, and is under the full control of Yolo County.

The northern end of Clear Lake adjacent to Rodman Slough and Middle Creek was blocked off with levees between 1900 and 1940, and the land was reclaimed for agricultural use. During the summer months, Clear Lake provides irrigation flows for agricultural operations in Yolo County. Management of the lakebed is provided by the County of Lake, in accordance with authorities granted by the State Lands Commission in 1973. A project is currently under way to breach the levees and restore 1,650 acres (670 ha) of lake and wetland. Bloody Island will again be an island. The additional water resulting from the increased lake area will be allocated to municipal districts drawing water from the lake. Yolo's water allowance under the Solano Decree may also be increased.

The management of the lake level is thus designed to avoid flooding, provide water to Yolo County and local water companies, and maintain enough water for recreational use.

Sewage from many Lake County towns no longer flows into the lake; instead, it is pumped to The Geysers geothermal plant.

On September 15, 2014, the lake level fell to −0.31 feet (−9.4 cm) on the Rumsey gauge, the lowest level since the 1977 drought. When full, the lake level measures 7.56 feet (230 cm).

== Environmental issues ==
=== Agriculture and wetlands ===
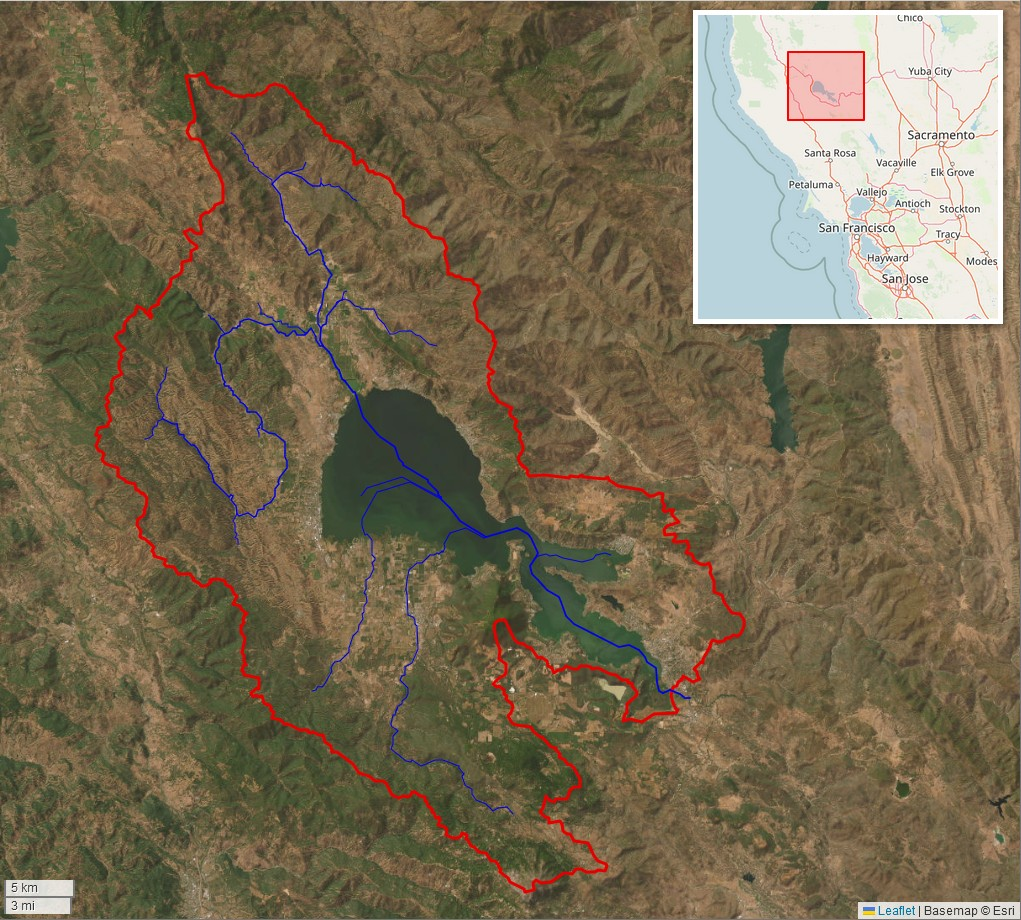
Clear Lake watershed (Interactive map)

The Clear Lake Watershed contains both freshwater marshes and vernal pools. The freshwater marshes are characterized by emergent vegetation including tules and cattails among other species. Ecologists have identified over 1,500 vernal pools in the area, largely located on private lands. The largest remaining wetlands include Anderson Marsh State Park and Rodman Slough. Wetlands in the Clear Lake watershed serve a variety of important ecological functions, including providing habitat for local fish and wildlife, as well as filtering sedimentation entering the lake from streams. Due to increased agricultural and urban land use, Clear Lake's historic wetland habitats have been reduced by 79%. Agriculture has been a significant form of land use in the region since the mid-19th century. Analysis of sediment cores drawn from the lake indicate that the increase in sedimentation rates corresponds with an increase in the use of heavy agricultural equipment in the 1930s. Other agricultural activities such as stream channelization, groundwater pumping, application of fertilizers and pesticide use have contributed to lake sedimentation, hillside erosion and floodplain encroachment.

The primary pollutant of concern associated with agriculture in the area is nitrate, with elevated nitrate levels having been identified in the Big Valley area. Agriculture impacts area groundwater sources through pumping, and is responsible for 82% of water usage in the watershed. This usage may contribute to early drying of stream beds, which impacts local wildlife and riparian vegetation.

=== Pesticides ===
In 1949, as part of an effort to boost tourism and improve the local economy, DDD (dichlorodiphenyldichloroethane) was applied to the lake in heavy doses to eradicate the gnats that were driving summer tourists away from the lake. The treatment succeeded in controlling the gnats that year and for the following year; however, the gnat population rebounded in 1953, prompting another application in 1954. The final application of DDD to Clear Lake was made in 1957 (Cook 1963). Numbers of western grebe were found dead, their tissues containing high concentrations of DDD. The effects were devastating to the local ecology. From 1962 to 1975, carefully planned applications of methyl parathion were made for Clear Lake gnat control. The gnat still occurs in Clear Lake, but at much lower numbers than in the 1940s–1970s. Its population is believed to be kept in check now by two introduced fish species (the threadfin shad and the inland silverside) that compete with the gnat for its preferred zooplankton for food.

=== Invasive species ===
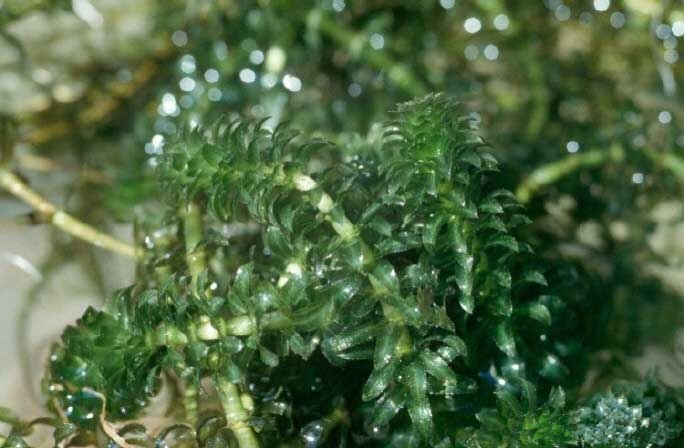
Up-close image of hydrilla. By USGS.

The ecology of Clear Lake has been significantly altered due to the presence of invasive species.

A notable invasive species is hydrilla (Hydrilla verticillata), a submerged aquatic plant which notably out-competes both native and non-native species to create pure stands. The plant established so successfully due to its ability to break into smaller propagules, which can survive in sediment for up to seven years. The presence of hydrilla can affect fish stocks, and interfere with recreational boating or fishing. Hydrilla prevention is overseen by the California Department of Food and Agriculture’s Hydrilla Eradication Program, whose goal is the eradication of existing hydrilla populations and prevention of future infestations. The program has been highly successful, managing to keep the lake hydrilla-free for two years before being detected once again in 2019.

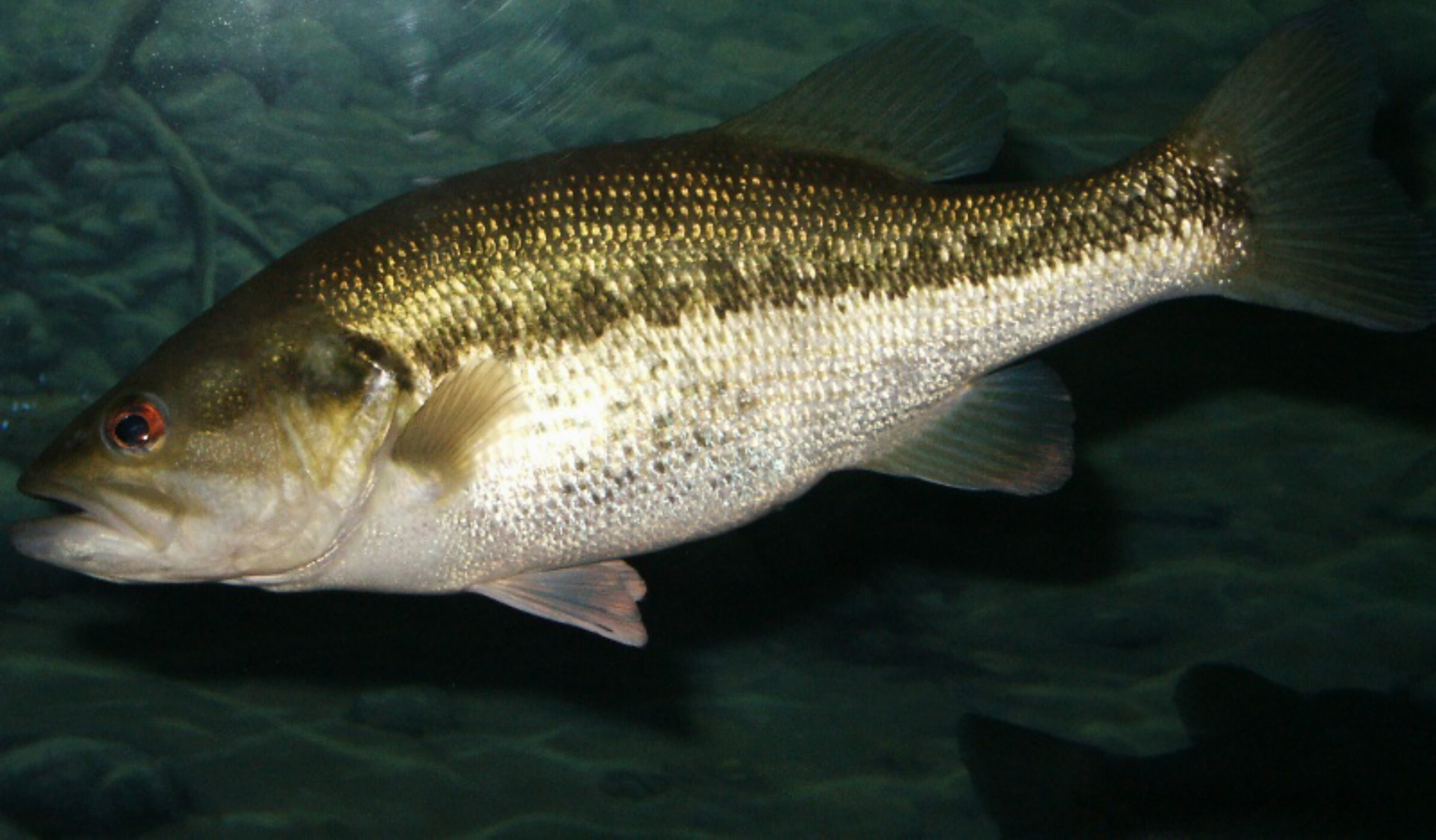
Up-close image of largemouth bass. By Robert Pos.

Furthermore, the lake has been subjected to a long history of non-native fish introductions. In the 1860s and 1870s, goldfish (Carassius auratus) and lake whitefish (Coregonus clupeaformis) were some of the first species to be introduced to Clear Lake. Mississippi silverside (Menidia audens) were the most abundant fish in the lake soon after their introduction in 1967. Moreover, both the Florida strain largemouth bass (Micropterus salmoides floridanus) and the Northern largemouth bass (M. salmoides salmoides) populations of the lake have persisted for decades after introduction.

The lake is also actively monitored for quagga mussels (Dreissena bugensis) and zebra mussels (D. polymorpha), although there are no established populations of either species in Clear Lake.

=== Harmful algal blooms ===
Due to its shallow depth and warm temperatures, Clear Lake is naturally eutrophic. Written records documenting cloudy discolorations in the lake exist from the late 19th century. Cyanobacteria (blue-green algae) in the lake can produce blooms often beginning in the spring and lasting through the fall. Referred to as harmful algal blooms (HAB), these blooms consist of solid mats of scum and are associated with unpleasant odors. Studies have shown that increased nutrient contents, especially in the form of phosphorus, from fertilizer runoff can potentially influence cyanobacteria blooms The California Water Boards have found that phosphorus loading in Clear Lake is largely driven by sedimentation due to erosion from agricultural activities as well as channel erosion, mining activities, wildfires, off-highway vehicle use, and timber harvesting. Harmful algae blooms have been found in the waters of private wells close to the lakeshore.

Types of toxin-producing cyanobacteria that have been identified in Clear Lake include the following genera: Anabaena, Microcystis, Oscillatoria, Planktothrix, Aphanizomenon, Cylindrospermopsis, and Lyngbya, all of which can cause short- and long-term health effects. Studies are ongoing to determine the various environmental factors responsible for harmful algal blooms.

=== Heavy metal contamination ===
The lake is heavily contaminated with mercury from the nearby Sulphur Bank Mercury Mine. The abandoned mine was declared a Superfund site in the early 1990s and is still undergoing clean-up. The California Department of Fish and Wildlife presently recommends that women of child-bearing age and children do not consume certain fish from Clear Lake, due to the presence of methylmercury compounds in lake sediments.

=== Monitoring, mitigation, and restoration ===
Clear Lake has been identified as an impaired water body under Section 303(d)(1)(A) of the Clean Water Act. This designation indicates that the water body does not comply with applicable water quality standards. As such, the area is required to comply with quality management strategies such as Total Maximum Daily Loads (TMDLs) to satisfy federal regulatory requirements. The Central Valley Regional Water Quality Control Board has identified point sources of pollution in Clear Lake as Caltrans and storm water permitees. Nonpoint sources of pollution in Clear Lake include the Bureau of Land Management, the U.S. Forest Service, irrigated agriculture, and the County of Lake The lake and the surrounding watershed are being monitored through sampling of gauges placed by the California Department of Water Resources.

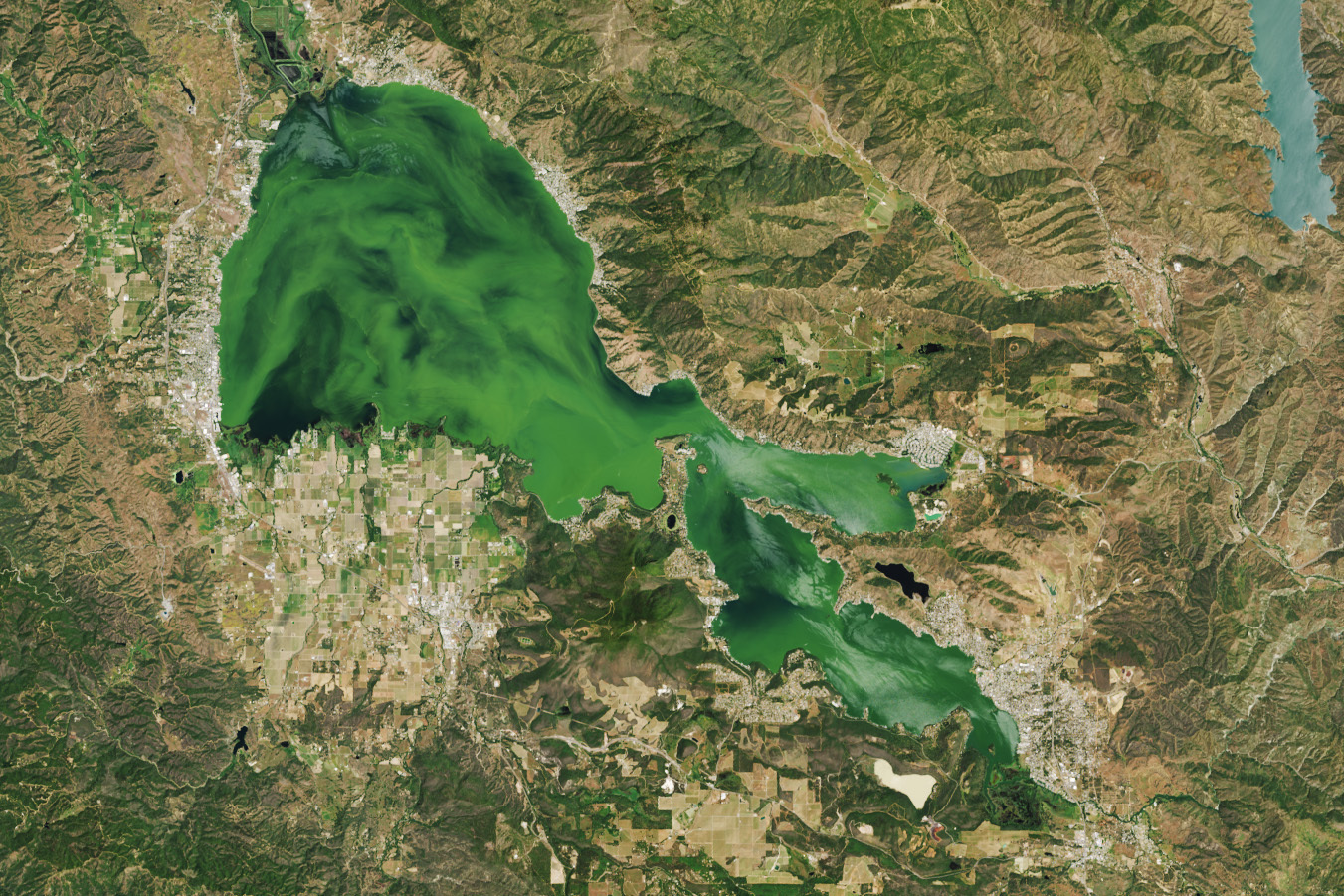
A phytoplankton bloom in Clear Lake in mid-May 2024 (NASA Earth Observatory image using Landsat data)

The Middle Creek Project was started in 1995 by Lake County to restore native wetlands to the Clear Lake area. The project set a goal of expanding the current wetlands area to double its current size. Lake County has additionally ensured no further loss of wetlands by the passage of the County Shoreline Ordinance which prohibits the removal of wetland vegetation on private property.

In 2009 the Middle Creek and Hamilton City Flood Damage Restoration and Ecosystem Act (AB74) was signed by Governor Arnold Schwarzenegger. The project was to provide funding to breach the levees and restore 1,650 acres (670 ha) of lake and wetland. Bloody Island should again be an island. The project has the additional aim of reducing the amount of phosphorus entering the lake by 40%. The additional water resulting from the increased lake area is to be allocated to municipal districts drawing water from the lake. Yolo's water allowance under the Solano decree may also be increased.

The passage of Assembly Bill 707 allowed for the creation of the Blue Ribbon Committee for the Rehabilitation of Clear Lake. The committee is made up of 15 county-appointed members from tribes, universities and various governmental organizations. The committee is charged with providing scientifically sound recommendations for the management of Clear Lake's "economy, ecosystem, and heritage".

A Cyanobacteria Task Force was formed in 2014 which includes the Big Valley, Elem, Scotts Valley and Robinson tribes, as well as various state and federal governmental agencies. The task force focuses primarily on monitoring activities, particularly water sampling and testing for toxins. Various local ordinances protect the lake from land-use practices in the domesticated areas of the surrounding watershed, and the lake's water quality impairments are addressed by federal and state regulatory programs. Multiple water suppliers in communities surrounding the lake provide potable water for municipal uses in accordance with California's public health regulations.

Lake County participates in the state's Department of Water Resources' Integrated Regional Water Management programs, within the Westside Region including Lake, Colusa, Napa, Solano, and Yolo counties. The Lake County Watershed Protection District is the lead agency for Lake County's participation in the Westside Region's long-term (2013–2033) water management programs. Within the jurisdictional boundary of the County of Lake, the Watershed Protection District provides the "Lake County Clean Water Program" for compliance with the National Pollutant Discharge Elimination System (NPDES) pollution prevention programs, and with the NPDES stormwater management permit (issued by the State Water Resources Control Board as Water Quality Order 2013-0001-DWQ), by implementing the Lake County "Stormwater Management Plan".

Lake County also complies with the NPDES aquatic pesticide permit program, allowing licensed pesticide applicators to eradicate nuisance aquatic weeds, in accordance with the "Clear Lake Integrated Aquatic Plant Management Plan". Multi-jurisdictional programs for natural resource management in the Clear Lake watershed—including federal, state, and local land owners in the County of Lake—are described in the "Clear Lake Integrated Watershed Management Plan".

== See also ==
- List of reservoirs and dams in California
- List of lakes in California
