= Glenhaven, California =

Unincorporated community in California, United States

Glenhaven
- Unincorporated community
- Location in California Glenhaven (the United States)
- Coordinates: 39°01′35″N 122°43′59″W
- Country: United States
- State: California
- County: Lake
- Elevation: 1,350 ft (410 m)
- ZIP code: 95443

Glenhaven (formerly, Gum Tree Point) is an unincorporated community in Lake County, California, United States. It is located on Clear Lake, 3 miles (4.8 km) west of Clearlake Oaks, at an elevation of 1345 feet (410 m).
