= Blue Lakes (California) =

Lakes in Lake County, California, US

- Lagos Azules (Spanish)
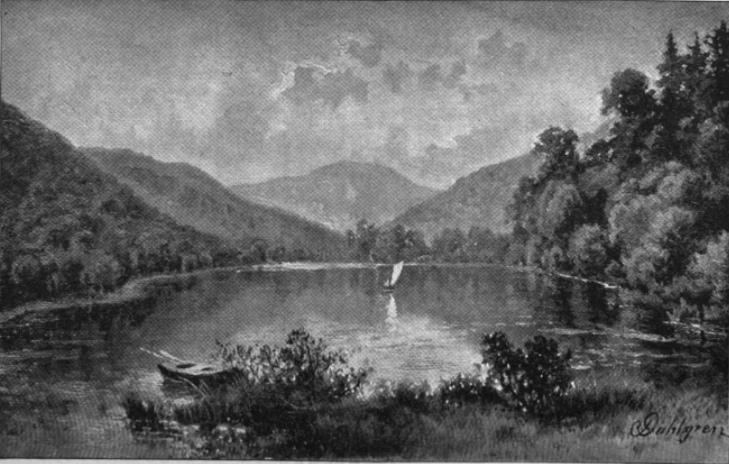
- Blue Lakes, California, 1892

- Location within California Location within the United States
- Location: Lake County, California
- Coordinates: 39.170398°N 123.011340°W
- Primary outflows: Scotts Creek
- Basin countries: United States
- Surface elevation: 1,358 feet (414 m)

The Blue Lakes are a string of two or three lakes in Lake County, California, set in a deep canyon. At one time they seem to have been in the Russian River watershed, but a recent geological upheaval cut them off from that basin and they now drain via Scotts Creek into Clear Lake in the Sacramento River basin. In the 19th and early 20th centuries there were several resorts around the lakes. Their waters have been highly altered by human activity and most of their native fish are lost, but they have a healthy population of largemouth bass.

== Location ==
The Blue Lakes are in the Cache Creek watershed in northwestern Lake County, about 7 miles (11 km) west of Upper Lake. Their drainage basin comprises the upper northwest section of the Cache Creek basin. They are at an elevation of 1,358 feet (414 m). Upper Blue Lake is about 1,361 feet (415 m) above sea level, covers about 55 acres (22 ha) and contains about 3,960 acre-feet (4,880,000 m^{3}) of water. Lower Blue Lake is shallower and covers 53 acres (21 ha). The Köppen climate classification is Csb : Warm-summer Mediterranean climate.

The Blue Lakes as a whole have a length of about 3 miles (4.8 km) and a breadth of 1/2 mile (0.80 km). They form a line running in a northeast direction down to Scotts Creek, which drains into Clear Lake. The upper two lakes are connected by a wide channel, and are known collectively as Blue Lake or Upper Blue Lake. The settlement of Midlakes lies between Blue Lake and Lower Blue Lake, which is connected by a short channel to Scotts Creek. California State Route 20 runs along the northeast shore of the lakes.

== Geological changes ==
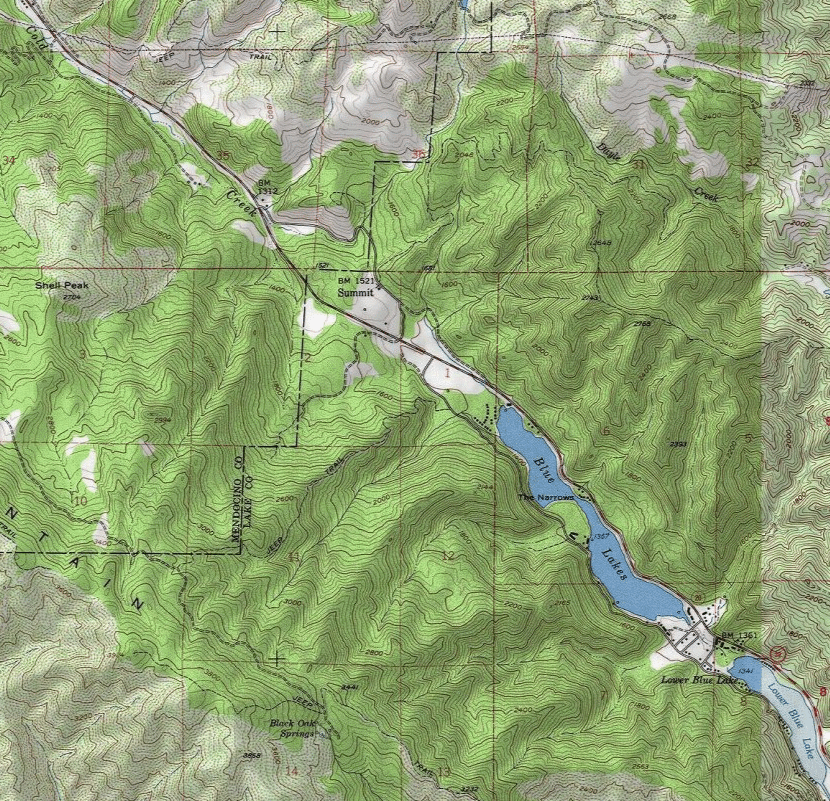
Valley holding Cold Creek (NW) and Blue Lakes (SE)

The Clear Lake basin lies between the watersheds of the Sacramento River and the Russian River. When it was formed about 600,000 years ago it drained east into the Sacramento Valley. About 200,000 years ago the Clear Lake Volcanic Field blocked its outlet. The lake rose until it found a new outlet, draining west through the Blue Lakes into Cold Creek and the Russian River. At some time in the last 10,000 years a landslide at the west end of the Blue Lakes blocked this outlet, the lake rose again, and created its present outlet via Cache Creek to the Sacramento River.

The gradual mountain pass between Cold Creek basin and Upper Blue Lake is called Da-no lokj'tam, or "mountain fell-in", by the Northern Pomo. They have a legend that water from Clear Lake once drained west through the Blue Lakes, then through Cold Creek into Coyote Valley and the Russian River. Then there was a great earthquake and a huge landslide blocked the flow out of Clear Lake. The land was forced up, and Clear Lake began to drain to the east through Cache Creek. This is plausible, since there have been tectonic events in the region and Clear Lake is 600 feet (180 m) higher than the Ukiah Valley.

An 1891 account gave more detail: "At the head of the upper lake, just on the western line of the county, is a break in the mountain line which encloses Lake County like the rim of a basin. On the west of this gap Cold Creek heads, and flows down to Russian River, which comes from Potter Valley, twenty miles farther north, and goes on south into Sonoma, turning west to the Pacific. The older Indians tell of a time in the days that were, when the waters of the Blue Lakes, and probably of Clear lake also, pursued this path to the ocean. At present the drainage line is almost due east, by way of Cache Creek and the Sacramento River. The Indians say that the ridge was raised after three days of earthquake. The whole district shows evidences of volcanic action, and has many singular geological features and numerous mineral springs."

According to Professor Ruliff Stephen Holway (1907) the waters of Blue Lakes and Scotts Creek once drained into Russian River by way of Cold Creek, but in recent prehistorical times a large landslide formed a ridge that diverted these waters to Clear Lake. (Note: Holway, writing before the idea of plate tectonics had been developed, wrote of the blockage being caused by a landslide rather than by the ridge being raised up as described by the Northern Pomo.) This could account for the relatively mature profile of Cold Creek. (Note: A Google terrain map of the region shows State Route 20 runs southwest from Saratoga Springs on the edge of the Clear Lake valley, then turns northwest to run past the Blue Lakes at an elevation of 1,358 feet (414 m) and through the valley that holds Cold Creek in its northwest end. The highway then turns southwest down the Coyote Valley to Lake Mendocino at an elevation of 737.5 feet (224.8 m), which drains into Russian River. The Blue Lakes would have drained along the valley that holds this section of State Route 20 before it was blocked.)

== Surroundings ==
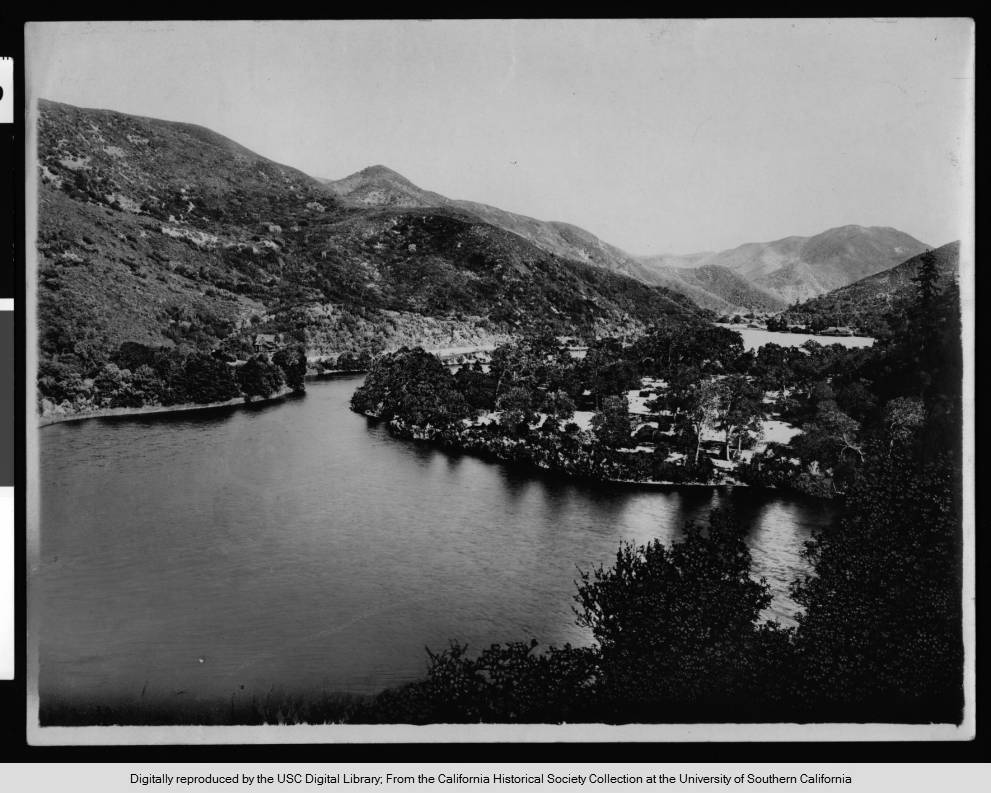
Blue Lakes ca1910 by Michael Rieder (1868-1949)

An 1890 account by the State Mineralogist said,

I observe first, that the canyon itself [Blue Lakes Canyon] is very deep, its sides also being very steep; it is furthermore very narrow. The Blue Lakes themselves are usually called three in number, although the two upper ones are connected by a narrow strait. They are beautiful little sheets of water lying in the bottom of the narrow canyon, whose sides come down almost precipitously to the water's edge. They are said to be very deep. I estimated the lower one to be a little less than a mile in length, with a maximum width of perhaps a quarter of a mile. The two upper lakes are probably each of them from half to three quarters of a mile in length, and as already stated, are connected so as to form in reality a single sheet of water.

An 1891 description said,

The Blue Lakes are two of the most charming lakes in the State. They lie at the bottom of a long, deep valley which rises with almost precipitous sides from the water; intense blue is surrounded by the perpetual green of the dark coniferous forest about them. No streams flow into these lakes, nor is there any outlet except in the rainy season, when the short mountain torrents cause them to overflow, across a low neck of land, into a small lake, Tulé, and so on into Clear Lake. Springs in the bottom of the lakes doubtless supply them, and they are heavily stocked with speckled trout, perch, "silver-sides," and other species of fish.

A mineral springs resort was founded at Blue Lakes, visited both by the sick for cures and by the wealthy and fashionable as summer resorts. The Blue Lakes Hotel could accommodate 40-50 guests, and had a white sulphur spring on its 320 acres (130 ha) grounds. The neighboring forests had plentiful game, including deer, rabbits, quail and pigeons. Resorts in 1892 included Laurel Dell, a Swiss cottage on a grassy flat on the lower lake with smaller corrages around it, the Blue Lakes Hotel, with a hotel and several pretty cottages, where the upper lake flowed into the lower in a lawn-like expanse of grassland with clumps of gnarled and moss-covered oak, and Le Trianon, a very prettily situated hotel at the upper end of the upper lake.

== Water and fish ==
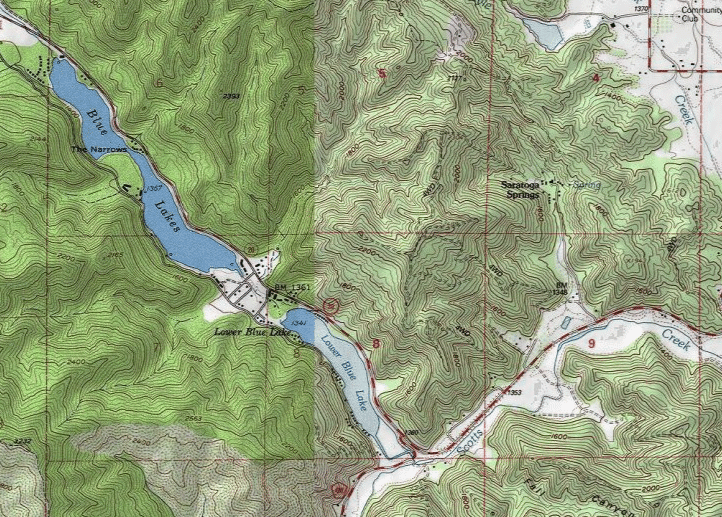
Map of the lakes, Scotts Creek to the south

The Blue Lakes today are highly altered and have lost the majority of their native fishes. They are surrounded by housing which reduces shoreline habitat and contributes pollutants. In 2019 anatoxin was detected in the Blue Lakes, but later tests showed no sign of the toxin, so warning signs were removed in January 2020. Lower Blue Lake, like Clear Lake, is eutrophic, alkaline with a pH of c. 8, and fairly turbid with a Secchi depth less than 2 metres (6 ft 7 in). Upper Blue Lake, in contrast, is clear and cool.

The original Pomo people of the region know of a legend that a monster fish, or water dragon, lived in the Upper Blue Lake, and therefore never camped close to the lake. In the 1870s the newspapers reported various sightings of this monster. Clear Lake prickly sculpin are only found in Clear Lake and in Upper and Lower Blue lakes. Clear Lake tule perch are endemic to Clear Lake, Lower Blue Lake and Upper Blue Lake. Its populations seem to have dropped to very low levels in Clear Lake and they are probably absent from Lower Blue Lake, but they are still common in Upper Blue Lake.

The inland silverside (Menidia beryllina) was introduced from Lake Texoma, Oklahoma, into the Blue Lakes and Clear Lake in 1967 to test its effectiveness in controlling the Clear Lake gnat and chironomid midges. About 6,000 fish were released in Upper Blue Lake and 3,000 in Lower Blue Lake and Clear Lake. Within a year the silversides were abundant in Lower Blue Lake and Clear Lake. They have since been widely distributed in California through experimental introductions by the Department of Fish and Game, illegal introductions by bait fishermen and dispersal via man-made waterways.

A general survey of fish along the shoreline of Upper Blue Lake was conducted in June 2014. Fish collected included common carp (Cyprinus carpio), bluegill (Lepomis macrochirus), largemouth bass (Micropterus salmoides), rainbow trout (Oncorhynchus mykiss), green sunfish (Lepomis cyanellus), prickly sculpin (Cottus asper) and brown bullhead (Ameiurus nebulosus). Of 376 fish caught, 342 were largemouth bass, followed by bluegill (12), common carp (11), green sunfish (9), and one specimen each of brown bullhead, prickly sculpin and rainbow trout.

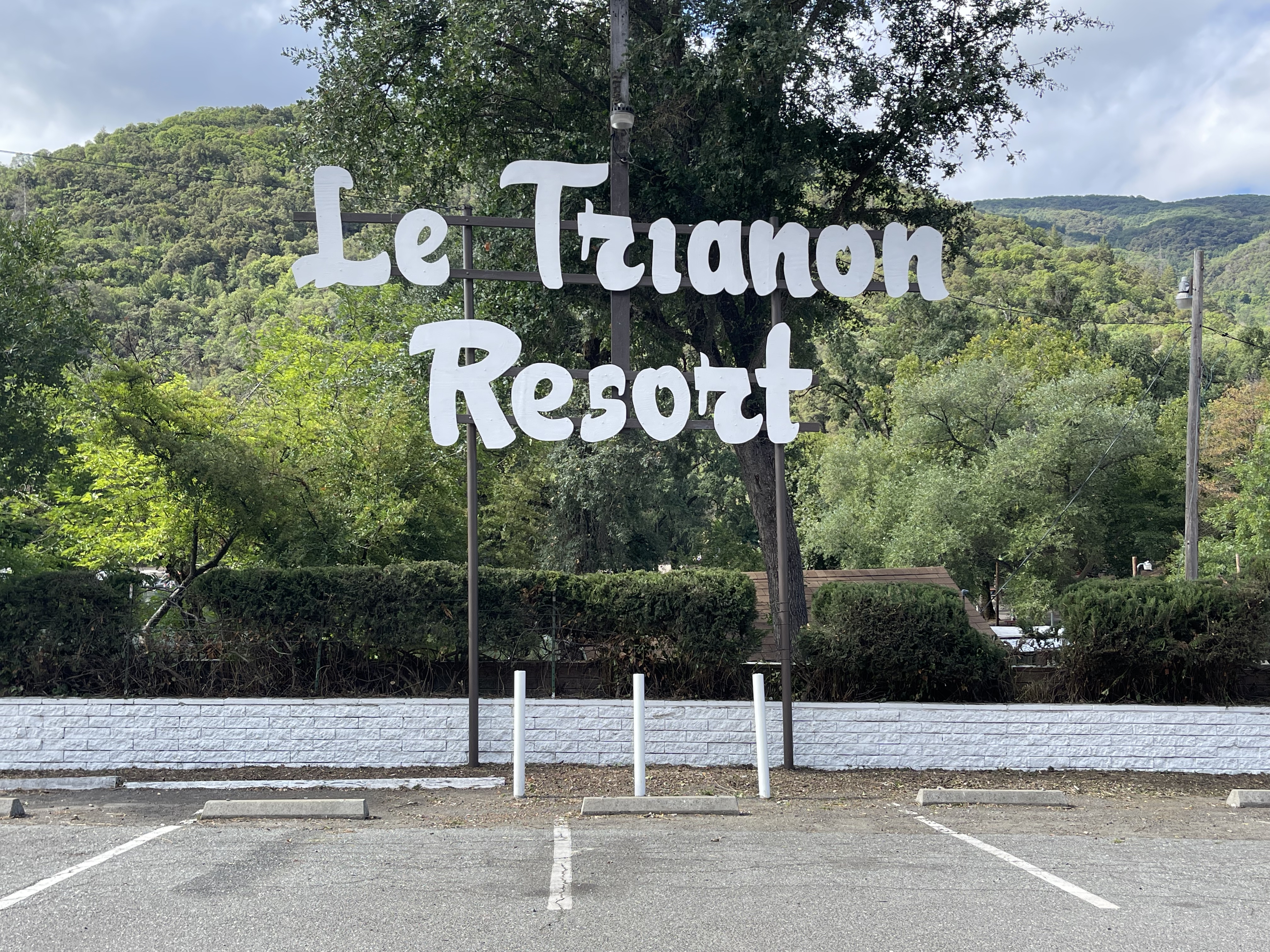
The Le Trianon Resort sign at the Blue Lakes in Upper Lake, California in 2023.

== Recreation ==
Residents of Upper Lake or Lakeport are a short drive away. There are campsites and more upscale lodgings for longer stays.. There is a speed limit of 5 miles per hour (8.0 km/h) on the lakes. Visitors can swim or fish in the lakes, or use kayaks, canoes or paddle boards. Apart from bass and bluegill, the waters are regularly stocked with rainbow trout. Upper Blue Lake is the more popular, since the colder water supports excellent trout and bass fishing, but both lakes hold very large bass. A 12 pounds (5.4 kg) bass has been weighed on a certified scale.

== Sources ==
- A Memorial and Biographical History of Northern California, Illustrated: Containing a History of this Important Section of the Pacific Coast from the Earliest Period of Its Occupancy...and Biographical Mention of Many of Its Most Eminent Pioneers and Also of Prominent Citizens of Today, Lewis publishing Company, 1891
- Barrett, Samuel Alfred (1908), The ethno-geography of the Pomo and neighboring Indians
- "Blue Lakes", Geographic Names Information System, United States Geological Survey, United States Department of the Interior
- Blue Lakes, Lake County Chamber of Commerce, 2016
- "Blue Lakes, Lake County, California, United States", Mindat
- Brooke, George Charles (1892), "Through Lake County in a six-in-hand", The Californian, Californian Publishing Company
- Chittenden, Newton H. (1884), Health Seekers', Tourists' and Sportsmen's Guide to the Sea-side, Lake-side, Foothill, Mountain and Mineral Spring Health and Pleasure Resorts of the Pacific Coast, C.A. Murdock
- Clear Lake prickly sculpin, State of California Department of Fish and Wildlife
- Clear Lake tule perch, State of California Department of Fish and Wildlife
- Ewing, Ben (Spring 2014), Upper Blue Lake General Fish Survey, State of California Department of Fish and Wildlife
- Irelan, W.M. Jr. (1890), Report of the State Mineralogist, Department of Conservation, Division of Mines and Geology
- Kemp, Kym (4 July 2019), Odd, Old News: The Blue Lakes Monster
- Knight, Terry (4 February 2020), "Blue Lakes offers excellent fishing", Lake Country Record-Bee
- Lundquist, Erica (February 2010b), Middle Creek Watershed Assessment (PDF), Middle Creek Coordinated Resource Management and Planning Group, archived from the original (PDF) on 2021-05-17
- "Officials: No further detection of anatoxin from algae in Blue Lakes", Lake County News, 23 January 2020
- Shapovalov, Leo; Cordone, Almo I.; Dill, William A. (1981), "A List of the Freshwater and Anadromous Fishes of California", Ca/If. Fish and Game, 67 (1): 4–38
- Shinn, Charles Howard (1891), "The California Lakes", Overland Monthly and Out West Magazine, A. Roman and Company
- "State Route 20 terrain map", Google Maps
- "Timeline: The Russian River: Earliest Times", Potter Valley Project, Mendocino County Inland Water & Power Commission
- Watson, E.B.; Pendleton, R.L. (1919), "Soil Survey of the Ukiah Area, California", Field Operations of the Bureau of Soils, vol. 16, United States Bureau of Soils, p. 2636 (Soil Survey of the Ukiah Area, California at the Internet Archive)
- "Way: Blue Lake (47506174)", OpenStreetMap
- Welch, James R. (2013-05-10), Sprouting Valley: Historical Ethnobotany of the Northern Pomo from Potter Valley, California, Society of Ethnobiology, ISBN 978-0-9887330-2-2
