= Upper Lake, California =

- Unincorporated Community; Census Designated Place
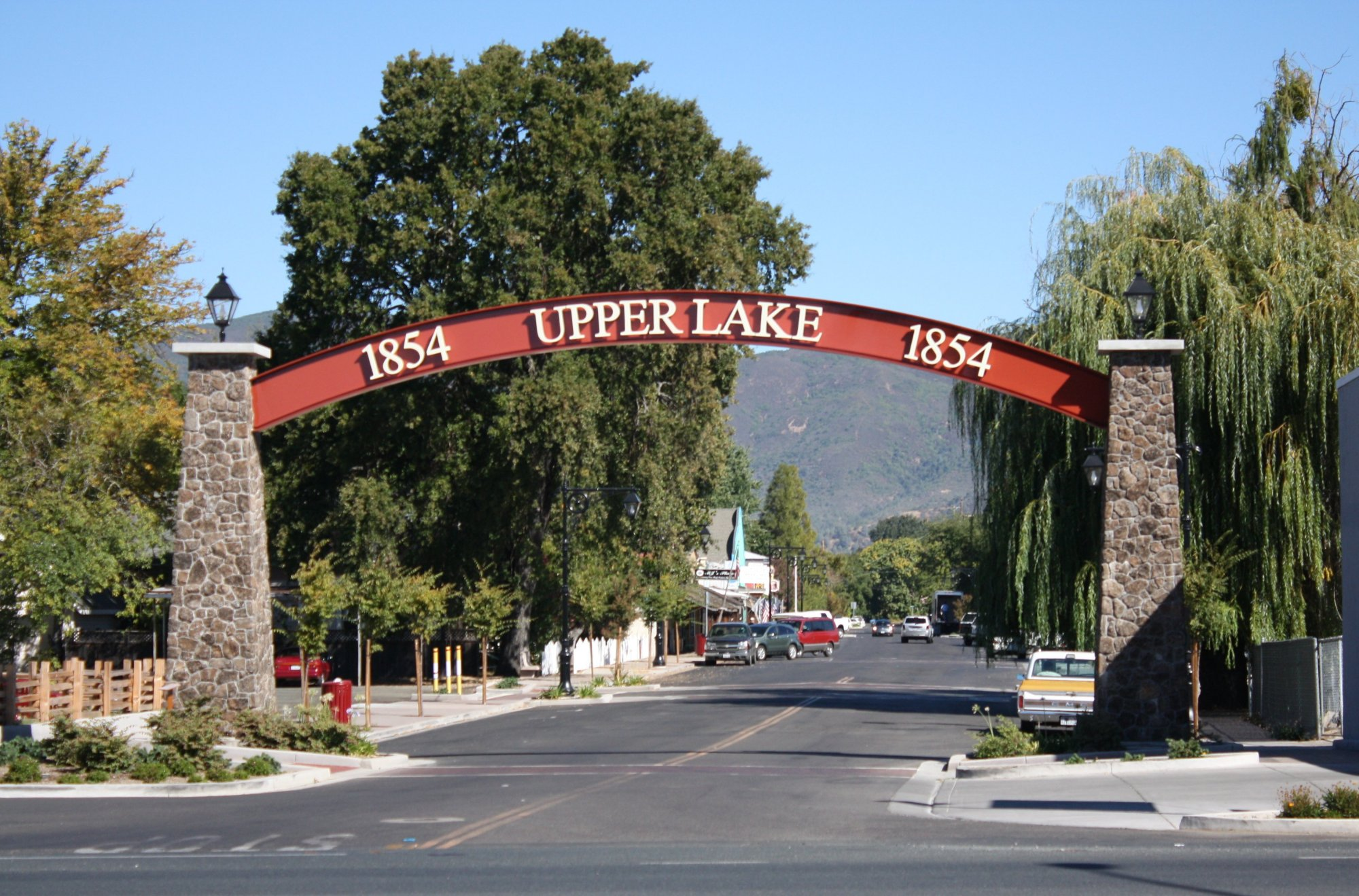
- Upper Lake is the gateway to Mendocino National Forest.

- Location within Lake County and the state of California
- Coordinates: 39°09′53″N 122°54′38″W
- Country: United States
- State: California
- County: Lake
- Established: 1866

Area
  - Total: 1.72 sq mi (4.46 km^{2})
  - Land: 1.71 sq mi (4.44 km^{2})
  - Water: 0.0077 sq mi (0.02 km^{2}) 0.46%
- Elevation: 1,350 ft (410 m)

Population (2020)
  - Total: 1,095
  - Density: 639/sq mi (246.7/km^{2})
- Time zone: UTC-8 (Pacific)
  - Summer (DST): UTC-7 (PDT)
- ZIP code: 95485
- Area code: 707
- FIPS code: 06-81358
- GNIS feature IDs: 236896, 2409382

Upper Lake is a census-designated place (CDP) in Lake County, California, United States. Upper Lake is located 8 miles (13 km) north of Lakeport, at an elevation of 1,345 feet (410 m). The population was 1,095 at the 2020 census, up from 1,052 at the 2010 census. The Habematolel Pomo of Upper Lake are headquartered here.

== Etymology ==
This community was formerly named Upper Clear Lake and Upperlake. The Upper Clear Lake post office opened in 1871, changed its name to Upper Lake in 1875, to Upperlake in 1905, and then back to Upper Lake in 1906.

== History ==
The settlement began in 1854 or 1856, when William B. Elliott opened a blacksmith's shop. About ten years later, in 1866, a man named Bukofsky built a store, followed by another blacksmith shop built by Caspar Sweikert. A hotel was started by Henry Taylor. A grist mill was built in 1858 and closed in 1867. A second grist mill was built in 1875. The community grew as cattle stock, alfalfa and bean canneries became the main economic draws.

Upper Lake was a hub of most activities in the northern part of Lake County. In 1860, when Upper Lake was known as Upper Clear Lake, there existed a 20-mile (32 km) toll road between the town and Lower Lake which routed through Lakeport. In 1865, the "Blue Lakes Wagon Road Co." completed a toll road which connected Upper Lake to Ukiah. In 1872 the Upper Lake & Clover Valley Toll Road Co." built an improved route that connected Bartlett Springs. Bartlett Springs sat in the high mountains east of Upper Lake and had a toll road running east into the Sacramento valley. These toll roads became the major route to move people in and out of Lake County. Folks from around the world could take a train to Hopland, then take a stagecoach to Lakeport. From Lakeport they would take a steamboat across Clear Lake to Bartlett Landing. The Wharf was located along the shoreline just east of Upper Lake. From there they would take a stagecoach via Upper Lake up to Bartlett Springs Resort. Travelers could also take a train from the San Francisco Bay area into the Sacramento Valley and then take a stage into Lake County via Bartlett Springs and Upper Lake. By the early 1890s, all major routes into and out of Lake County were toll roads.

== Geography ==
According to the United States Census Bureau, the CDP has a total area of 1.7 square miles (4.4 km^{2}), of which over 99% is land.

At the 2000 census, according to the United States Census Bureau, the CDP had a total area of 6.0 square miles (16 km^{2}), of which 5.8 square miles (15 km^{2}) was land and 0.2 square miles (0.52 km^{2}), or 3.33%, was water.

The Hayville Sulphur Spring, formerly used medicinally, is located 5 miles (8 km) northwest.

== Climate ==
Upper Lake has a Hot-summer Mediterranean climate (Csa) according to the Köppen climate classification system.

Climate data for Upper Lake (1893–2006)
Month	Jan	Feb	Mar	Apr	May	Jun	Jul	Aug	Sep	Oct	Nov	Dec	Year
Record high °F (°C)	85 (29)	97 (36)	90 (32)	93 (34)	102 (39)	109 (43)	111 (44)	109 (43)	110 (43)	104 (40)	94 (34)	80 (27)	111 (44)
Mean daily maximum °F (°C)	54.6 (12.6)	58.3 (14.6)	62.7 (17.1)	68.8 (20.4)	74.7 (23.7)	84.1 (28.9)	93 (34)	92.6 (33.7)	87.2 (30.7)	76.7 (24.8)	64.4 (18.0)	55.9 (13.3)	72.8 (22.7)
Mean daily minimum °F (°C)	32.9 (0.5)	34.7 (1.5)	36.6 (2.6)	39.5 (4.2)	43.4 (6.3)	48.3 (9.1)	52 (11)	50.2 (10.1)	45.9 (7.7)	40.3 (4.6)	35.6 (2.0)	32.6 (0.3)	41 (5)
Record low °F (°C)	9 (−13)	13 (−11)	19 (−7)	24 (−4)	28 (−2)	30 (−1)	32 (0)	33 (1)	27 (−3)	17 (−8)	16 (−9)	10 (−12)	9 (−13)
Average precipitation inches (mm)	7.35 (187)	5.28 (134)	4.46 (113)	2.26 (57)	1.11 (28)	0.37 (9.4)	0.03 (0.76)	0.07 (1.8)	0.33 (8.4)	1.77 (45)	4.19 (106)	6.86 (174)	34.09 (866)
Average snowfall inches (cm)	0.9 (2.3)	0.3 (0.76)	0.2 (0.51)	0 (0)	0 (0)	0 (0)	0 (0)	0 (0)	0 (0)	0 (0)	0.2 (0.51)	0.4 (1.0)	2 (5.1)
Average precipitation days	13	10	10	6	4	2	0	0	1	4	8	10	68
Source: WRCC

== Demographics ==
Historical population
Census	Pop.	Note	%±
2000	989		—
2010	1,052		6.4%
2020	1,095		4.1%
U.S. Decennial Census; 1860–1870 1880-1890; 1900 1910 1920; 1930 1940 1950; 1960 1970 1980; 1990 2000 2010; 2020

Upper Lake first appeared as a census designated place in the 2000 U.S. census.

=== Racial and ethnic composition ===
Race and Ethnicity
Racial and ethnic composition	2000	2010	2020
White (non-Hispanic)	78.26%	71.48%	57.35%
Hispanic or Latino (of any race)	14.86%	23.0%	31.05%
Two or more races (non-Hispanic)	2.22%	2.47%	7.4%
Native American (non-Hispanic)	3.34%	1.71%	3.2%
Other (non-Hispanic)	0.51%	0.0%	0.73%
Black or African American (non-Hispanic)	0.81%	0.67%	0.27%
Asian (non-Hispanic)	0.0%	0.67%	0.0%
Pacific Islander (non-Hispanic)	0.0%	0.0%	0.0%

=== 2020 census ===
As of the 2020 census, Upper Lake had a population of 1,095. The population density was 638.9 inhabitants per square mile (246.7/km^{2}). The racial makeup of Upper Lake was 64.4% White, 0.3% African American, 5.1% Native American, 0.0% Asian, 0.0% Pacific Islander, 14.5% from other races, and 15.7% from two or more races. Hispanic or Latino of any race were 31.1% of the population.

The census reported that 99.5% of the population lived in households and 0.5% were institutionalized. 0.0% of residents lived in urban areas, while 100.0% lived in rural areas.

There were 400 households, of which 26.3% had children under the age of 18 living in them. Of all households, 37.0% were married-couple households, 12.0% were cohabiting couple households, 24.3% were households with a male householder and no spouse or partner present, and 26.8% were households with a female householder and no spouse or partner present. About 31.3% of all households were made up of individuals, and 18.0% had someone living alone who was 65 years of age or older. The average household size was 2.73. There were 224 families (56.0% of all households).

The age distribution was 23.5% under the age of 18, 6.8% aged 18 to 24, 28.6% aged 25 to 44, 25.8% aged 45 to 64, and 15.3% who were 65 years of age or older. The median age was 38.4 years. For every 100 females, there were 111.0 males, and for every 100 females age 18 and over there were 103.4 males age 18 and over.

There were 454 housing units at an average density of 264.9 units per square mile (102.3 units/km^{2}). Of these, 400 (88.1%) were occupied and 54 (11.9%) were vacant. Of the occupied units, 72.8% were owner-occupied and 27.3% were occupied by renters. The homeowner vacancy rate was 2.0% and the rental vacancy rate was 0.0%.

== Economy ==
=== Viticulture ===
The Upper Lake area emerged as a wine-growing region in the 1880s, counting among his earliest viticulturists Serranus Clinton Hastings, who farmed 125 acres (51 ha) of vineyards and built a winery and distillery in operation until 1900. Charles M. Hammond planted a 25-acre (10 ha) vineyard in the late 19th century which was still thriving in 1914.

Viticulture and winemaking activities were wiped out by Prohibition and the Depression when vineyards were abandoned or replanted with orchards, most notably walnuts, which remain a key crop in the area. Wine grapes were replanted starting in the 1970s during the California viticulture boom, and by 2022 there were about 300 acres (120 ha) of wine grape cultivation and the Upper Lake Valley appellation was established.

=== Canning ===
The early economy of Upper Lake comprised canning beans, growing alfalfa and raising cattle. During the late 19th century, canned beans developed into the primary economy for Upper Lake in the mid-20th century. The first cannery, which employed 400 people annually, was built in 1897 by A. Mendenhall. The first cannery was actually built by Mr. Henry Van Wambold. He built his "Blue Lakes Cannery" in 1895 and Mr. Mendenhall followed with his "Clear Lake Cannery" in 1897. This information is found in the State of California archives which show the application paperwork along with the trademark labels that were issued by California for each of these canneries. The name "Blue Lake" green bean was developed near the shores of the Blue Lakes of Lake County, near Upper Lake. Both these canneries were bought out in 1927 and were then renamed the "Lake County Cannery". The Lake County Cannery continued in operation until 1968.

== Government ==
In the California State Legislature, Upper Lake is in the 2nd senatorial district, represented by Democrat Mike McGuire, and in the 4th Assembly district, represented by Democrat Cecilia Aguiar-Curry.

In the United States House of Representatives, Upper Lake is in California's 4th congressional district, represented by Democrat Mike Thompson.

== Education ==
One of the first schools in Lake County was located in Upper Lake. The first teacher was J.W. Mackall, a former cashier at Farmers' Savings Bank.

== Notable people ==
Benjamin Dewell, a member of the Bear Flag Rebellion, settled in Upper Lake, becoming the first permanent white settler, along with his wife Celia, in 1854.
