= California State Route 20 =

State highway in California, United States

State Route 20
- SR 20 highlighted in red

Route information
- Maintained by Caltrans
- Length: 211.882 mi (340.991 km) (plus about 15.5 mi (25 km) on US 101)
- History: State highway in 1910–1919; numbered in 1934
- Tourist routes: Yuba-Donner Scenic Byway
- Restrictions: No hazardous material along the northeast shore of Clear Lake between SR 29 and SR 53

Major junctions
- West end: SR 1 in Fort Bragg
- US 101 from Willits to Calpella; SR 29 near Upper Lake; SR 53 near Clearlake; I-5 in Williams; SR 99 in Yuba City; SR 49 from Grass Valley to Nevada City
- East end: I-80 near Emigrant Gap

Location
- Country: United States
- State: California
- Counties: Mendocino, Lake, Colusa, Sutter, Yuba, Nevada, Placer

Highway system
- State highways in California; Interstate; US; State; Scenic; History; Pre‑1964; Unconstructed; Deleted; Freeways
← SR 19	→ SR 22

State Route 20 (SR 20) is a state highway in the northern-central region of the U.S. state of California, running east–west north of Sacramento from the North Coast to the Sierra Nevada. Its west end is at SR 1 in Fort Bragg, from where it heads east past Clear Lake, Colusa, Yuba City, Marysville and Nevada City to I-80 near Emigrant Gap, where eastbound traffic can continue on other routes to Lake Tahoe or Nevada.

Portions of SR 20 are built near the routing of what was first a wagon road and later a turnpike in the late 19th century. This road was extended through the state highway system all the way to Ukiah in the early 20th century, and the missing link near Clear Lake was completed in 1932 before the official designation of this highway as SR 20 in 1934. There have been subsequent improvements to the road, such as the conversion of the Grass Valley portion of the route to freeway standards.

== Route description ==
Route 20 is defined in section 320 of the California Streets and Highways Code. The definition omits the concurrency with Route 101 instead of duplicating that segment in the other route's definition in the code:

Route 20 is from:
(a) Route 1 near Fort Bragg to Route 101 at Willits.
(b) Route 101 to Route 80 near Emigrant Gap via Williams and Colusa.

State Route 20 begins at SR 1 in southern Fort Bragg, less than 1 mile (1.6 km) from the Pacific Ocean. It heads east, quickly climbing into the Mendocino Range along a ridge and crossing through Dunlap Pass. The highway continues to rise alongside the North Fork Big River and tributaries, crossing another summit and then descending to Willits in the Little Lake Valley via Broaddus Creek. An overlap with US 101 begins in Willits and heads southeasterly to Calpella, north of Ukiah in Redwood Valley. There SR 20 turns east again, crossing the Russian River, passing the north shore of Lake Mendocino, and rising to a summit via the East Fork Russian River and Cold Creek. The roadway again descends alongside the Blue Lakes and Scotts Creek to the junction with SR 29 and the settlement of Upper Lake in the Clear Lake Basin. SR 20 closely follows the northeast shore of Clear Lake, staying right above the water line to avoid the adjacent hills. Where the lake ends, SR 20 continues east, intersecting SR 53 and then following the North Fork Cache Creek and tributaries to the Lake–Colusa county line. During its final descent into the Sacramento Valley, SR 20 intersects SR 16 and curves north and back east, entering the valley via Salt Creek.

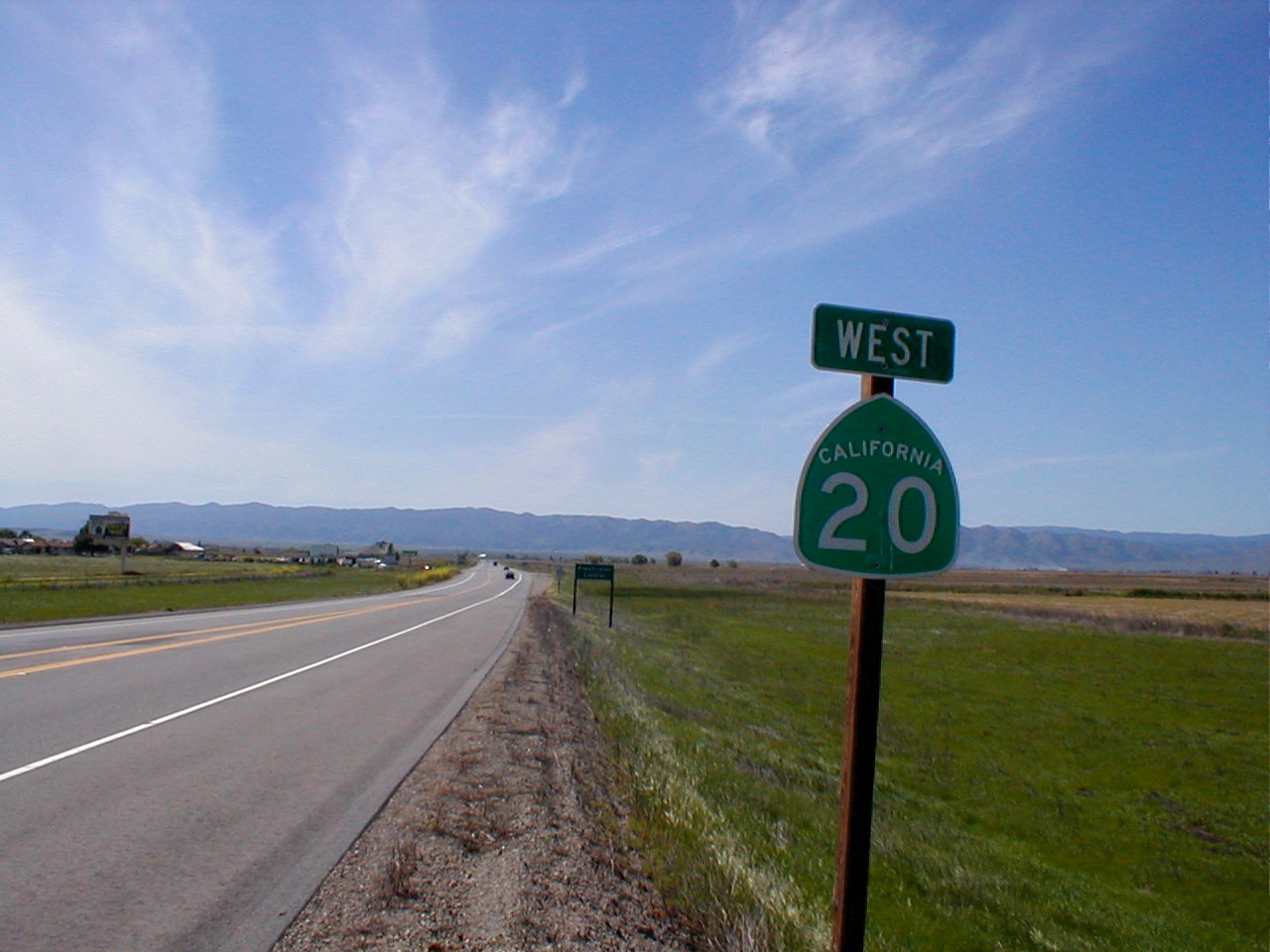
SR 20 in the Sacramento Valley

Once it enters the flat Sacramento Valley, SR 20 takes a generally straight path, crossing I-5 in Williams, overlapping SR 45 near the west bank of the Sacramento River southeast from Colusa, and then turning back east to cross the Sacramento River and Sutter Bypass on its way to Yuba City. The route crosses SR 99 west of central Yuba City, and runs east through northern Yuba City to the Feather River, which it crosses on the 10th Street Bridge into Marysville. Within the central part of that city, SR 20 makes several turns, first turning south from 10th Street onto E Street, then east on 9th Street (overlapping SR 70), north on B Street, and east on 12th Street (splitting from SR 70). The highway leaves Marysville to the northeast, paralleling the Yuba River on its north side as it enters the foothills of the Sierra Nevada.

SR 20 rises into the Sierra along the north side of the Yuba River, crossing to the south side near Smartsville and then climbing through several ravines to the Penn Valley. The current alignment, built in the mid-1980s as a mostly two-lane freeway, continues east across rugged terrain to the city of Grass Valley, where it joins SR 49 on the Golden Center Freeway. The two routes travel northeast to Nevada City, where SR 49 turns northwest and SR 20 resumes its eastward course as a two-lane highway. The roadway climbs from Nevada City and follows Harmony Ridge and Washington Ridge before descending into the Bear Valley via a series of hairpin turns, and then climbing, just north of Emigrant Gap, to its end at I-80 at Yuba Pass. The Pioneer Trail, a National Recreation Trail, parallels SR 20 from a point on Harmony Ridge to the Bear Valley, and includes parts of a branch of the California Trail first used in 1850.

SR 20 east of US 101 is part of the California Freeway and Expressway System, although it is mostly a two-lane surface road; west of SR 29 and east of SR 53, it is part of the National Highway System, a network of highways that are considered essential to the country's economy, defense, and mobility by the Federal Highway Administration. All of SR 20 is on the Interregional Road System, a highway system that connects major economic centers of the state, and has been selected by the California Department of Transportation (Caltrans) as a High Emphasis Route and Focus Route from US 101 to SR 29 and SR 53 to I-80, with the designated corridor following SR 29 and SR 53 around the south side of Clear Lake. It is also eligible for the State Scenic Highway System from SR 1 to SR 16 and SR 49 to I-80, and has been designated as such for 6 miles (9.7 km) near the east end; this is part of the federally designated Yuba-Donner Scenic Byway, a National Forest Scenic Byway that uses SR 20 east of SR 49.

== History ==
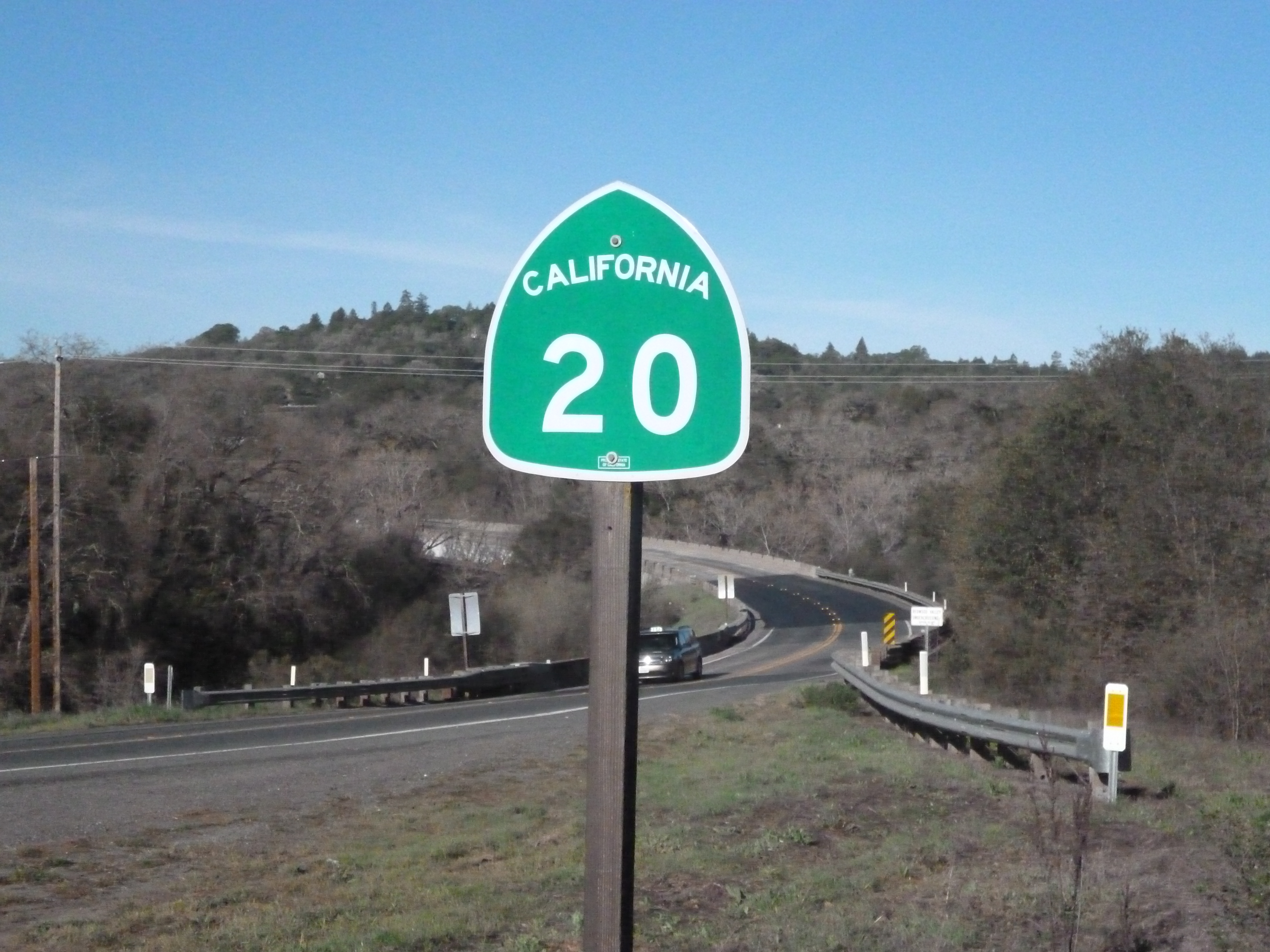
Marker along SR 20

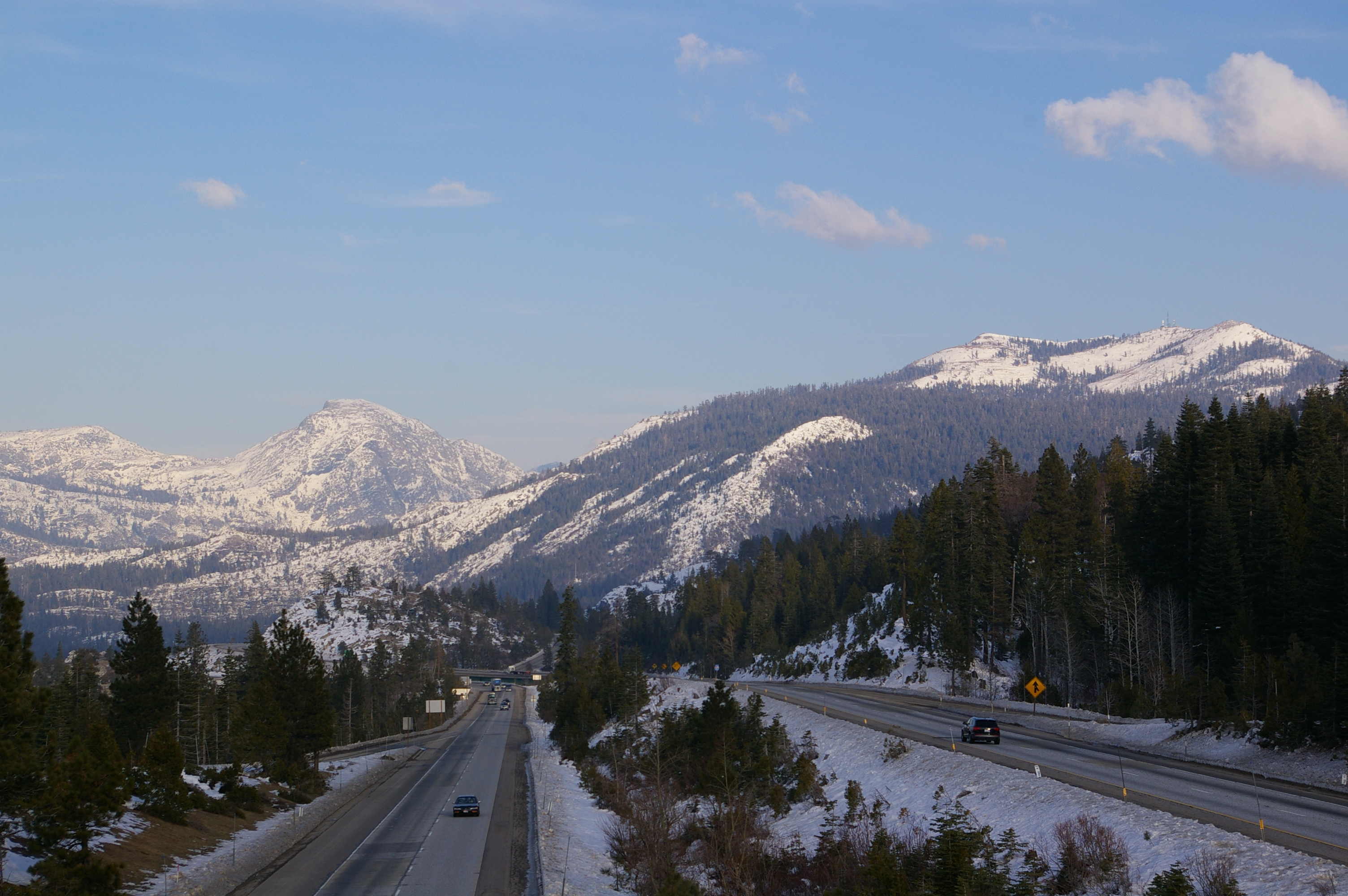
Donner Summit near the eastern terminus of SR 20

The east end of SR 20, from Bear Valley (just below Emigrant Gap) to Nevada City, closely follows a branch of the Truckee Route of the California Trail, first used by California-bound emigrants in 1850. Later a turnpike was built here by the same company that opened the Pacific Turnpike (Culbertson Road and Bowman Lake Road between Dutch Flat and Bowman Lake) in 1864.

By the end of the 1910s, a passable dirt and gravel road connected Ukiah and Nevada City via the south side of Clear Lake and Marysville. The portion between Lower Lake and Wilbur Springs was impassable in wet weather, at which times the Bartlett Springs and Bear Valley Toll-road via Upper Lake and Bartlett Springs was available for $1.50 each way or $2.50 round trip. This route generally followed the present SR 20, except around Clear Lake and between Marysville and Rough and Ready (where it used Spenceville Road). Beyond Nevada City to Emigrant Gap, the old turnpike was not passable; instead the present SR 174 was available for eastward drivers. Between Williams and Colusa, the road was paved in concrete, as it had been added to the state highway system as part of the first (1910) bond issue, specifically as Route 15, connecting the west Sacramento Valley trunk (Route 7, now I-5) with the county seat of Colusa.

This state highway was significantly extended in both directions in 1919, west to Ukiah and east to Emigrant Gap, creating what was known as the Tahoe-Ukiah Highway, connecting Ukiah and Lake Tahoe in combination with Route 37 (now I-80) and Route 38 (now SR 89). The law that defined the extension simply stated that it would connect "Ukiah to Tahoe City"; the state decided in September 1925 that it would run the highway along the north shore of Clear Lake, combining with the planned Rumsey-Lower Lake Highway (Route 50, now SR 53 and SR 16) east to Wilbur Springs. With the completion of this segment in mid-1932, the highway was ready for heavy travel, and became Sign Route 20 in 1934 as part of the initial signed state route system.

In 1953, the legislature added an extension of Route 15 from US 101 at Willits (north of Ukiah) west to SR 1 near Fort Bragg. This was constructed (over an existing county road) and became part of Sign Route 20 prior to 1964, when the Route 20 designation was legislatively adopted. Subsequent improvements include the construction of the Golden Center Freeway, connecting Grass Valley with Nevada City, in the late 1960s, and a new alignment of SR 20 west from Grass Valley, bypassing Rough and Ready, in the mid-1980s.

== Major intersections ==
Except where prefixed with a letter, postmiles were measured on the road as it was in 1964, based on the alignment that existed at the time, and do not necessarily reflect current mileage. Postmile prefixes include: R reflecting a realignment in the route since then, M indicating a second realignment, L referring to an overlap due to a correction or change, and T indicating postmiles classified as temporary. Segments that remain unconstructed or have been relinquished to local control may be omitted. The numbers reset at county lines; the start and end postmiles in each county are given in the county column.

County	Location	Postmile	Exit	Destinations	Notes
Mendocino; MEN R0.00-44.11	Fort Bragg	R0.00		SR 1 (Shoreline Highway) – Caspar, Fort Bragg	Western terminus
Mendocino; MEN R0.00-44.11		33.217		US 101 north – Eureka	West end of US 101 overlap; US 101 exit 568
Mendocino; MEN R0.00-44.11		33.217	West end of freeway on US 101		
Mendocino; MEN R0.00-44.11		R32.63 (Note: Indicates that the postmile represents the distance along US 101 rather than SR 20.)	557	West Road – Redwood Valley	Exit number follows US 101
Mendocino; MEN R0.00-44.11			East end of freeway on US 101		
Mendocino; MEN R0.00-44.11		41.06	Ridgewood Summit		
Mendocino; MEN R0.00-44.11			West end of freeway on US 101		
Mendocino; MEN R0.00-44.11	Calpella	30.83 33.22	East end of freeway on US 101		
Mendocino; MEN R0.00-44.11	Calpella	30.83 33.22		US 101 south – Ukiah	Trumpet interchange; east end of US 101 overlap; US 101 exit 555B
Mendocino; MEN R0.00-44.11		33.77		Road 230 – Redwood Valley	Interchange via connector road; serves Redwood Valley Rancheria
Lake; LAK 0.00-46.48	Upper Lake	8.32		SR 29 south – Lakeport, Kelseyville	Roundabout; northern terminus of SR 29; serves Sutter Lakeside Hospital
Lake; LAK 0.00-46.48		31.62		SR 53 – City of Clearlake, Lower Lake, Lakeport	Roundabout; northern terminus of SR 53
Colusa; COL 0.00-R39.34	Wilbur Springs	3.45		SR 16 east – Woodland	Western terminus of SR 16
Colusa; COL 0.00-R39.34	Williams	T20.56		SR 20 Bus. east (E Street)	
Colusa; COL 0.00-R39.34	Williams	R21.85		Williams (I-5 BL)	Interchange via connector road; former US 99W
Colusa; COL 0.00-R39.34	Williams	R22.12		I-5 – Redding, Sacramento	Interchange; I-5 exit 578
Colusa; COL 0.00-R39.34	Williams	T23.19		SR 20 Bus. west (Husted Road) / Freshwater Road	
Colusa; COL 0.00-R39.34	Colusa	31.09		SR 45 north (Market Street west) – Princeton	West end of SR 45 overlap
Colusa; COL 0.00-R39.34		36.79		SR 45 south / Steidlmayer Road – Grimes	East end of SR 45 overlap
Sacramento River		39.34 0.00		Meridian Bridge	
Sutter; SUT R0.00-17.06	Yuba City	15.57		SR 99 – Chico, Sacramento	
Sutter; SUT R0.00-17.06	Yuba City	16.84		Sutter Street / 2nd Street	Interchange; 2nd Street not signed westbound
Feather River		17.06 0.00		10th Street Bridge	
Yuba; YUB 0.00-21.67	Marysville	0.57		I Street	Right-in/right-out interchange; eastbound exit and entrance
Yuba; YUB 0.00-21.67	Marysville	0.99		SR 70 south (E Street south) – Sacramento	West end of SR 70 overlap; former US 99E south
Yuba; YUB 0.00-21.67	Marysville	1.47		SR 70 north (B Street north) – Oroville	East end of SR 70 overlap
Yuba; YUB 0.00-21.67		13.27		CR E21 (Marysville Road) – Browns Valley, Dobbins, Brownsville	Southern terminus of CR E21; serves Collins Lake, Bullards Bar Reservoir
Nevada; NEV 0.00-41.287		6.60		Rough and Ready Highway / Penn Valley Drive – Rough and Ready, Penn Valley	At-grade intersection; west end of Eric W. Rood Memorial Expressway
Nevada; NEV 0.00-41.287	Grass Valley	R12.16	—	McCourtney Road / Mill Street	Interchange; McCourtney Road not signed westbound
Nevada; NEV 0.00-41.287	Grass Valley	R12.24	East end of Eric W. Rood Memorial Expressway		
Nevada; NEV 0.00-41.287	Grass Valley	R12.24– R12.30		SR 49 south / Empire Street east – Auburn	Interchange; west end of SR 49 overlap
Nevada; NEV 0.00-41.287	Grass Valley	R12.30	West end of freeway		
Nevada; NEV 0.00-41.287	Grass Valley	R12.92	182A	SR 174 – Colfax, Grass Valley	Northern terminus of SR 174
Nevada; NEV 0.00-41.287	Grass Valley	R13.61	182B	Idaho Maryland Road	Eastbound signage
Nevada; NEV 0.00-41.287	Grass Valley	R13.61	182B	E. Main Street	Westbound signage
Nevada; NEV 0.00-41.287	Grass Valley	R14.27	183A	Dorsey Drive	
Nevada; NEV 0.00-41.287	Grass Valley	R14.80	183B	Brunswick Road	
Nevada; NEV 0.00-41.287	Nevada City	R15.92	185A	Gold Flat Road / Ridge Road	Signed as exit 185 westbound
Nevada; NEV 0.00-41.287	Nevada City	R16.74	185B	Sacramento Street – Nevada City	Eastbound exit and westbound entrance
Nevada; NEV 0.00-41.287	Nevada City	R16.99	186	Broad Street	Eastbound exit and westbound entrance
Nevada; NEV 0.00-41.287	Nevada City	R17.24	186	Coyote Street – Historical District	No eastbound exit
Nevada; NEV 0.00-41.287	Nevada City	R17.24	East end of freeway		
Nevada; NEV 0.00-41.287	Nevada City	R17.40		SR 49 north / Uren Street – Downieville	East end of SR 49 overlap
Placer; PLA 41.287-43.87	Bear River	41.29	Bridge		
Nevada; NEV 43.87-45.66		45.66		I-80 – Reno, Sacramento	Interchange; eastern terminus; I-80 exit 161
1.000 mi = 1.609 km; 1.000 km = 0.621 mi: Concurrency terminus; Incomplete access

== Williams business loop ==
State Route 20 Business
- Location: Williams, California

State Route 20 Business (SR 20 Bus.) is a business route of California State Route 20 in Williams. It provides access to downtown Williams as E Street and Husted Road. The business route follows the original routing of SR 20 from its western terminus to Interstate 5. East of I-5, the original routing, which headed northeast out of Williams, has since been abandoned. The present-day route continues on E Street east to Husted Road, then turns north to the business route's eastern terminus at SR 20 at the northeastern tip of Williams.

Major intersections

The entire route is in Williams, Colusa County.

mi	km	Destinations	Notes
0.0	0.0	SR 20 – Clear Lake, Colusa	Western terminus
1.3	2.1	I-5 BL (7th Street)	Former US 99W
1.7	2.7	I-5 – Sacramento, Redding	Interchange; I-5 exit 577
2.3	3.7	Husted Road south	
3.3	5.3	SR 20	Eastern terminus
3.3	5.3	Freshwater Road	Continuation beyond SR 20
1.000 mi = 1.609 km; 1.000 km = 0.621 mi
