= Yuba–Donner Scenic Byway =

The Yuba–Donner Scenic Byway is an 175-mile (282 km) National Forest Scenic Byway through the Tahoe National Forest in the U.S. state of California. It consists of the following routes:

- Interstate 80 from Emigrant Gap to Truckee
- California State Route 89 from Truckee to Sierraville
- California State Route 49 from Sierraville to Nevada City
- California State Route 20 from Nevada City to Emigrant Gap
