= Cache Creek (Sacramento River tributary) =

Stream in California, US

Cache Creek Rivière la Cache
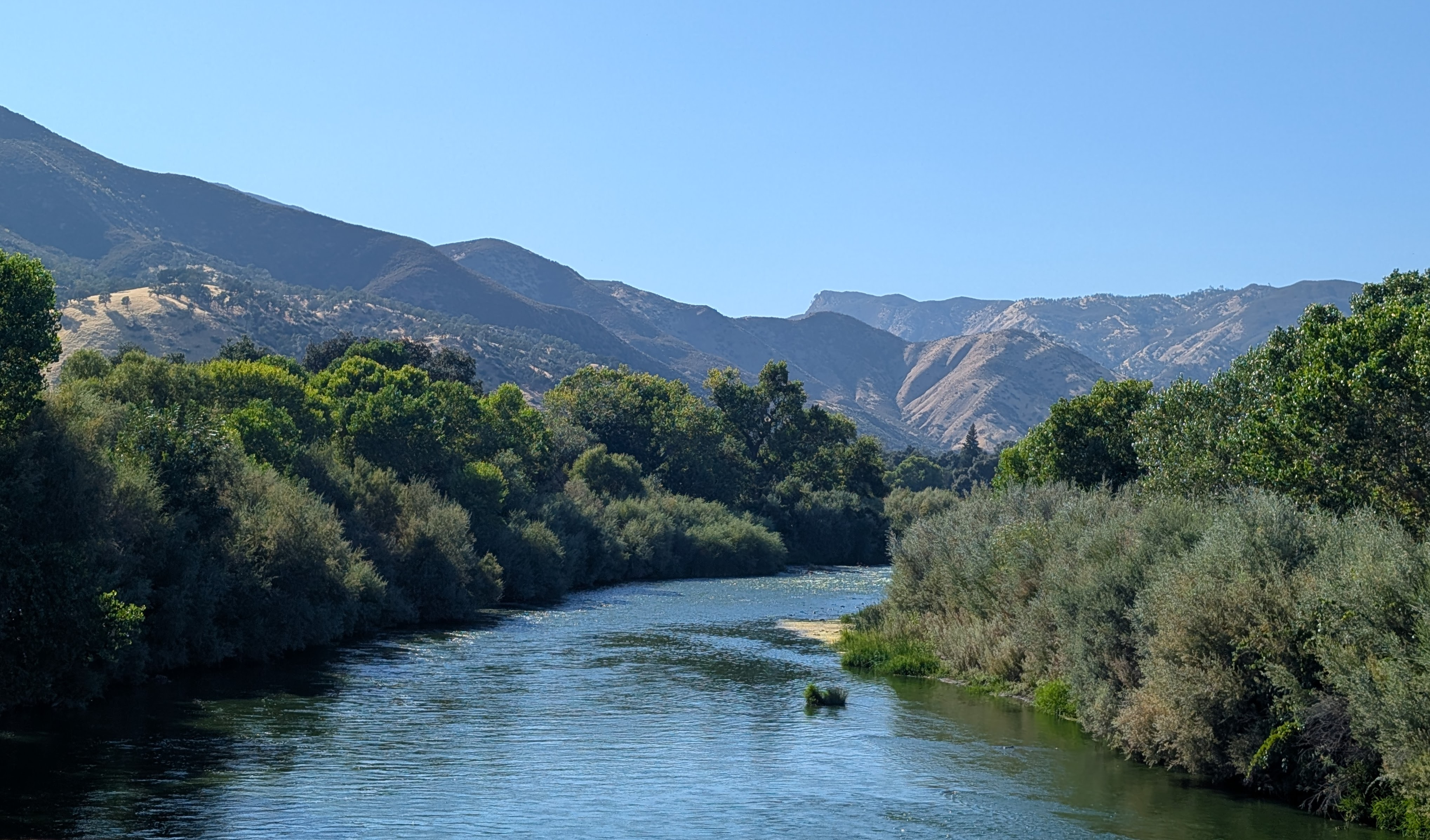
- Cache Creek near Rumsey

Location
- Country: United States
- State: California
- Region: Yolo County, Colusa County, Lake County

Physical characteristics
- Source: Clear Lake
  - location: southwest of Clearlake, California
  - coordinates: 38°56′10″N 122°38′35″W
- Mouth: Cache Creek Settling Basin
  - location: east of Woodland, California
  - coordinates: 38°41′24″N 121°41′30″W
  - elevation: 30 ft (9.1 m)
- Length: 87 mi (140 km)
- Basin size: 1,139 mi^{2} (2,950 km^{2})
- Discharge
  - location: Yolo, CA
  - average: 533 cu ft/s (15.1 m^{3}/s)
  - minimum: 0 cu ft/s (0 m^{3}/s)
  - maximum: 41,400 cu ft/s (1,170 m^{3}/s)

Basin features
- Tributaries
  - left: North Fork Cache Creek, Bear Creek

Cache Creek is an 87-mile-long (140 km) stream in Lake, Colusa and Yolo counties, California.

== Course ==
Cache Creek starts at the outlet of Clear Lake. It has two main tributaries: North Fork (starting in the Mendocino National Forest north of Clear Lake, and dammed by the Indian Valley Reservoir); and Bear Creek (starting in Bear Valley).

The Capay Diversion Dam, west of Capay, diverts water for distribution throughout Yolo County using a network of canals. At the end of the Capay Valley, near Esparto, Cache Creek runs east into Sacramento Valley, ending in a settling basin east of Woodland, the overflow of which runs into the Sacramento River through a flood control canal.

In addition to the recreational use of Clear Lake and Indian Valley Reservoir there are numerous trail-heads, parks and campgrounds, including the Bear Valley wildflower hotspot. Bear Creek and Cache Creek run in a scenic canyon along State Route 16 in Colusa and Yolo county, including the Cache Creek Regional Park. Cache Creek provides white-water rafting, both in the spring when it is flooded, and through the summer using the agricultural water flow. The entire area south of Route 20 and west of Route 16 is a wildlife preserve, hosting two herds of Tule Elk.

== History ==
The name of the water body comes from Hudson's Bay Company trappers who cached their furs along the Sacramento River and smaller tributaries, one of which became known to them as Cache Creek. One of their camps, recognized by early settlers as French Camp, was situated in a grove of oaks on the north bank of Cache Creek one mile (1.6 km) east of the present town of Yolo, California. Cache Creek was originally known to the Hudson's Bay Company trappers as Rivière la Cache.

Cache Creek was temporarily blocked north of Rumsey by a landslide caused by the 1906 San Francisco earthquake : Our Rumsey correspondent mentions the fall of Cache Creek as a result of an earthquake shock Tuesday night. The water has continued to fall some since that date and in some places it is dry. Upon investigation by the officials of the Water Company it was found that a landslide had dammed the Creek near the Leonard ranch in Lake county.... The creek subsequently broke through, causing severe flooding in Rumsey.

From 1800s to the mid-1900s, mercury was mined free of environmental regulation causing an influx of the element within Cache Creek. In 2001, the Central Valley Regional Water Quality Control Board and the U.S. Geological Survey confirmed that Cache Creek was a contributor to the increase of mercury levels within the Sacramento River. Since then, various regulations have been enacted to monitor the mercury levels in Cache Creek, and multiple studies have been conducted to find the site of contamination. The California Office of Environmental Health Hazard Assessment released an advisory regarding eating fish caught from this creek based on the mercury level.

== Geography ==
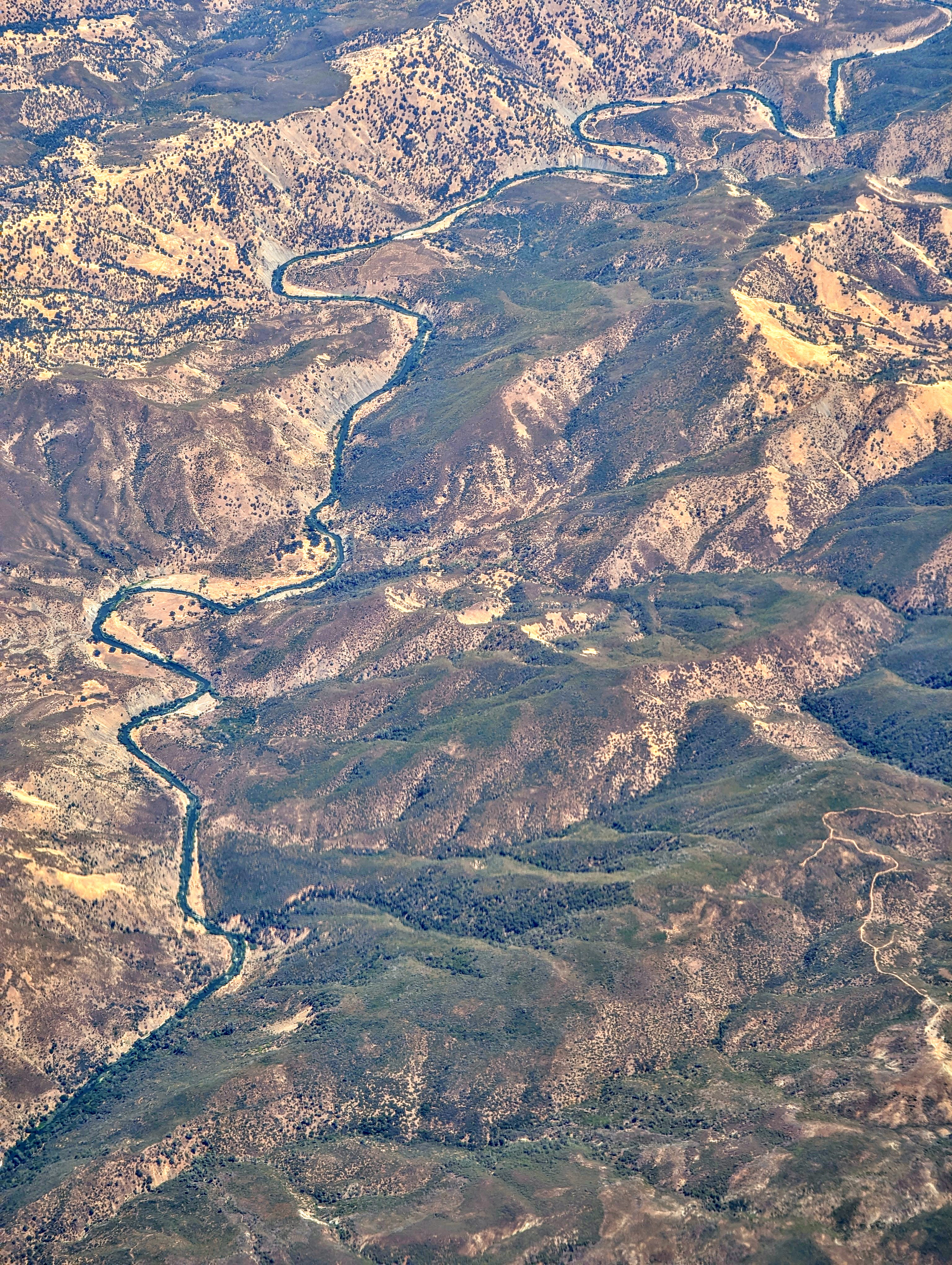
Aerial view of North Fork Cache Creek

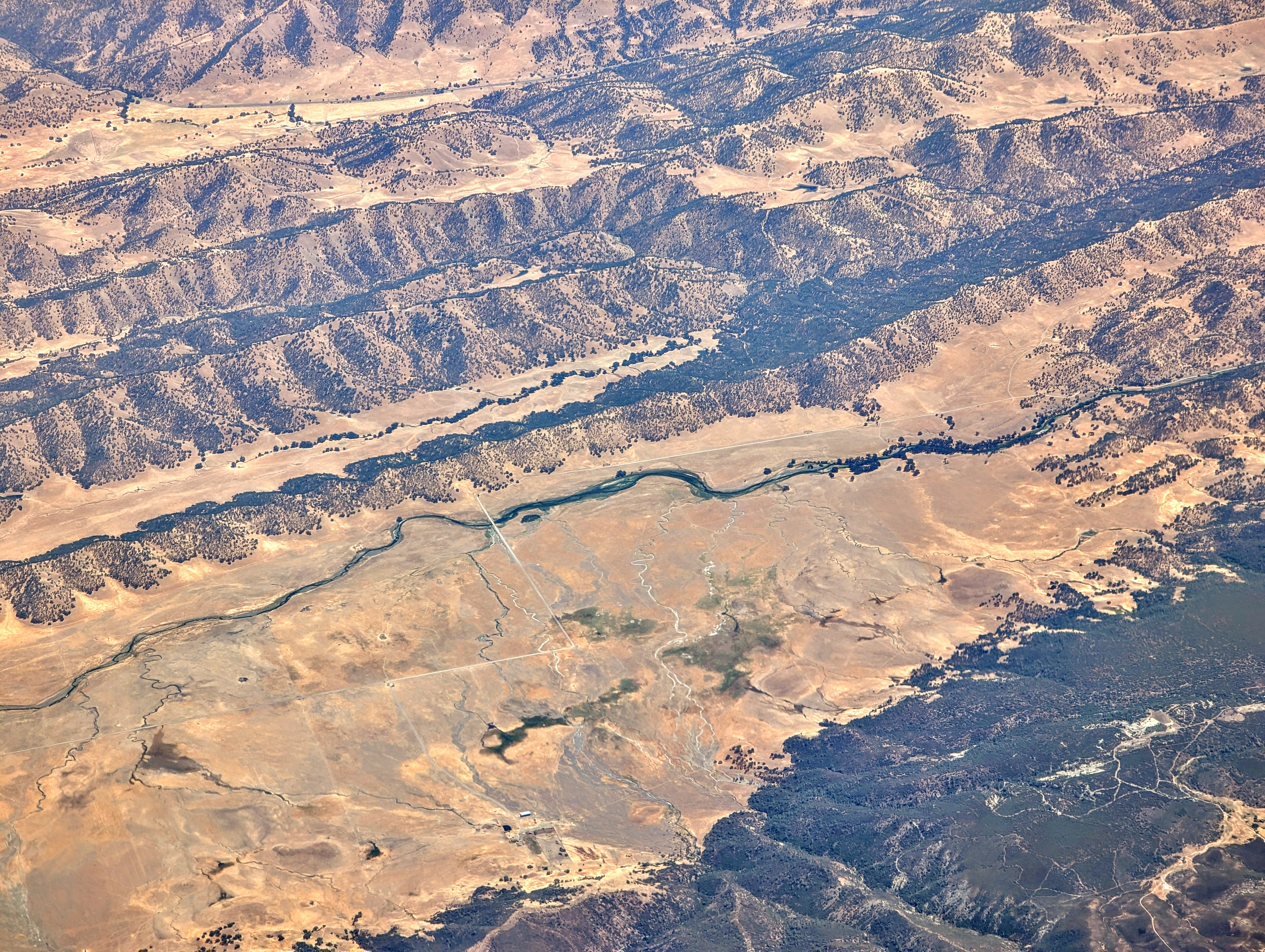
Aerial view of Bear Creek

Cache Creek has two main tributaries: North Fork, and Bear Creek.

Cache Creek begins at the south-east end of Clear Lake (for which it is the outlet), flowing east to the dam which now controls the level of Clear Lake.

The North Fork begins in Lake County in the Mendocino National Forest north of Upper Lake. It flows east, where it is joined by Bartlett Creek, and is then dammed by the Indian Valley Reservoir. It then flows south along New Long Valley Road, and turns east along State Route 20, which it crosses at the Cache Creek Recreation Area.

Cache Creek runs north-east from the dam, behind Perkins Creek Ridge and over The Jams Waterfall before joining the North Fork about 2 miles east of the bridge over Route 20.

Bear Creek starts in Bear Valley and runs south through a canyon (joining Sulphur Creek near Wilbur Springs) until it meets Route 20. It then runs east in parallel with Route 20 for a few miles, and turns south, again cutting through a canyon following State Route 16 in Colusa and Yolo Counties.

Meanwhile, Cache Creek cuts south-east between Cache Creek Ridge (on its north bank) and Little Blue Ridge (south bank), joining Bear Creek at Route 16 near the junction of Lake, Colusa and Yolo counties. The combined Cache Creek continues in the canyon until it emerges north of Rumsey in Capay Valley.

The Capay Diversion Dam, west of Capay, diverts water for distribution throughout Yolo County using a 175-mile (280 km) network of canals.

At the end of the Capay Valley near Esparto Cache Creek runs east into Sacramento Valley, ending in a settling basin east of Woodland. If the Sacramento river is not in flood then any overflow runs into the Tule Canal, continues as Prospect Slough and finally enters the Sacramento River at Cache Slough. If the Sacramento is in flood, then the overflow from the settling basin is swept into the Yolo Bypass and Sacramento Bypass flood control system, emerging directly at Cache Slough.

== Hydrology ==
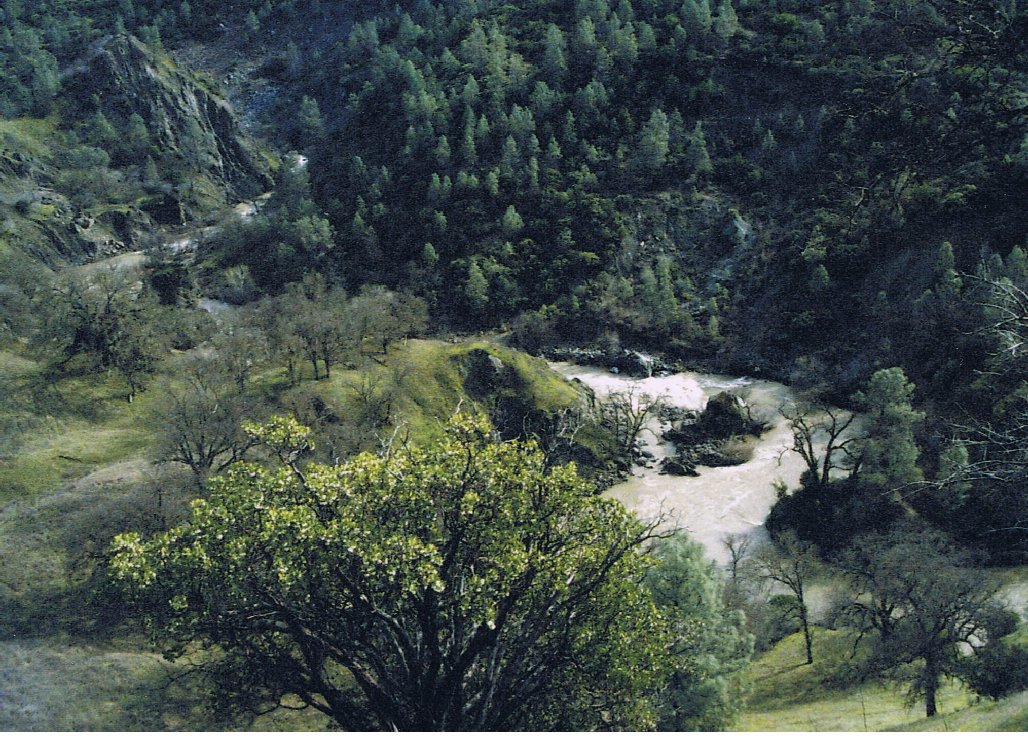
Cache Creek, in a canyon with native chaparral and woodlands habitat vegetation, in Lake County, northern California

Water rights and flooding protection have been in dispute between Yolo and Lake Counties since the late 19th century.

The Yolo County Flood Control & Water Conservation District ("Yolo") has "an 1855 priority right to divert the natural flow of Cache Creek, and 1912 priority right to store waters in Clear Lake to elevation 7.56 feet Rumsey Gauge for later release and beneficial use." Various decrees attempt to ensure a balance between the needs of the two counties, although high-water conditions can cause temporary disagreements. Under the Solano Decree Yolo currently holds appropriative rights for up to 150,000 acre-feet (190,000,000 m^{3}) per year from Clear Lake, and all the water from the Indian Valley dam.

The Cache Creek Dam on the South Fork of Cache Creek, five miles (8 km) downstream from Clear Lake, was built to increase Clear Lake's capacity and to regulate outflow for downstream users of Cache Creek water. The dam was later modified to include a 3 MW hydroelectric plant. The stream has a relatively small capacity, less than a quarter of the amount the dam is able to release. There is a rock ledge a mile and a half downstream of Clear Lake, called the Grigsby Riffle, near the bridge on State Route 53. This ledge restricts the amount of water that can flow through at that point. The limited capacity of the stream means that it takes a very long time to drain excess flow from Clear Lake, increasing the chance of flooding around the lake. The bottleneck is seen as a backup to prevent flooding downstream and Yolo County is prohibited from increasing the capacity of the channel by the Gopcevic and Bemmerly Decrees.

The Indian Valley dam on the North Fork of Cache Creek forms Indian Valley Reservoir. The dam's primary purpose is water storage for irrigation, but a 3.3 MW hydroelectric plant was built to take advantage of the falling water.

The Capay Diversion Dam, west of Capay, diverts water for distribution throughout Yolo County using a 175-mile (280 km) network of canals. For example, water is pumped into the Winters Canal, which runs south and ends in a reservoir near Winters. This feeds into Willows Canal, which runs east for miles alongside Putah Creek—the water of which is used primarily by Solano County. The 474 foot long, 15 foot high concrete dam was constructed in 1914. In 1994 its apron was raised with a 5-foot high inflatable bladder (the "longest in the world"), which can be raised or lowered in 30 minutes. It underwent substantial repairs starting in 2009.

== Mercury levels at Cache Creek ==
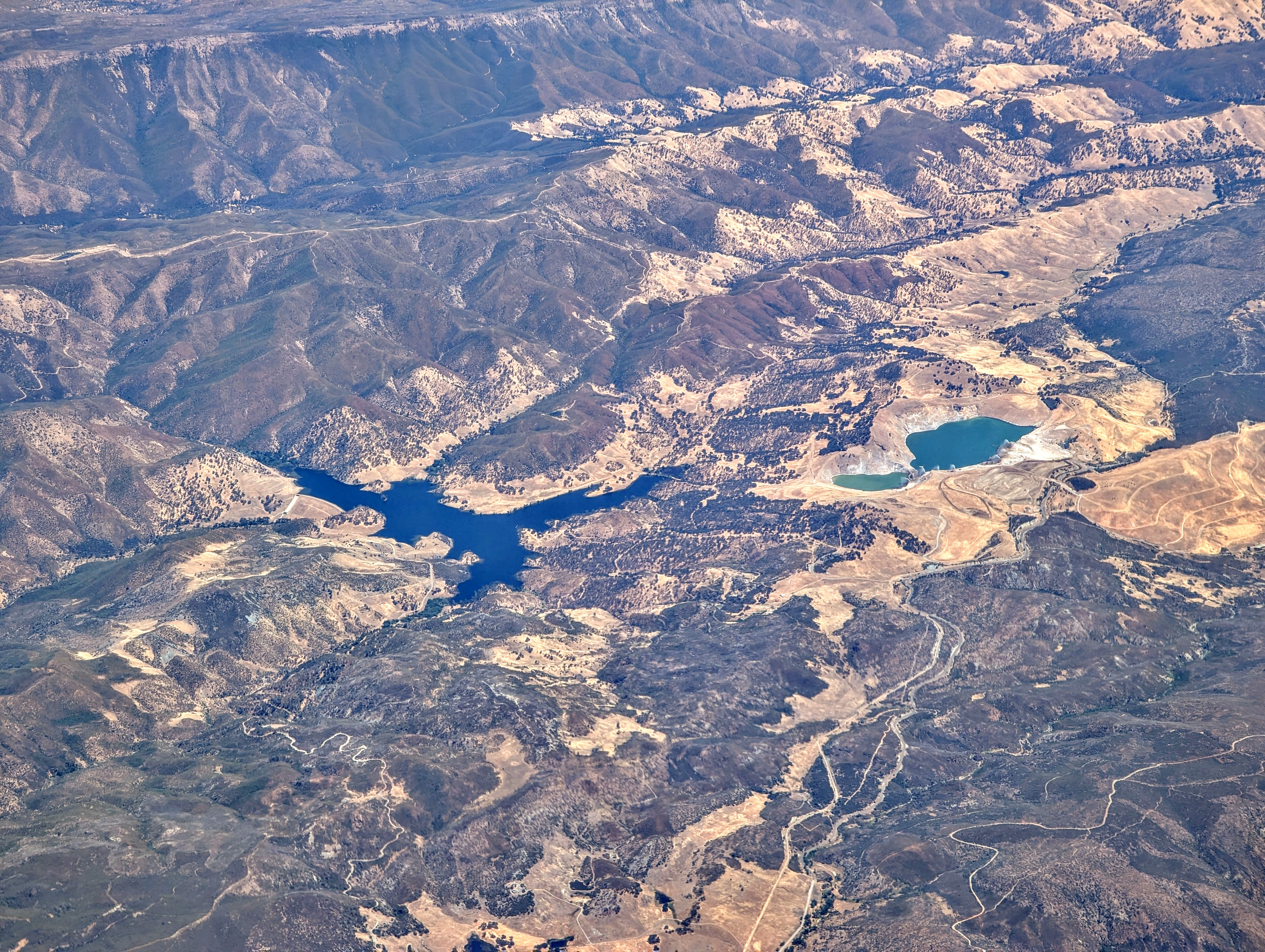
Aerial view of tributary Davis Creek, Davis Creek Dam (owned by Homestake Mining), and Homestake Mining operation, Yolo County Road 40

From the early 1800s to much of the 1900s, mining for elemental mercury, also known as quicksilver, was widely popular in Cache Creek's upper watershed, given its gold recovering properties. At the peak of mercury production, over 6 million pounds (2.7 million kg) of mercury were mined, creating large mining caverns across the entirety of California. Throughout this period, little to no environmental regulations had been established causing mercury, in the form of mining waste from retorting, to infiltrate water systems and make its way into Cache Creek . Through a process known as bio-accumulation, the integration of mercury into the creek caused increased levels of the element in organisms within the creek. If consumed, accumulation of high mercury levels within organisms, particularity fish, may induce harm to the nervous systems of unborn babies and young children.

Water quality studies conducted by the Central Valley Regional Water Quality Control Board and the U.S. Geological Survey from 1994 to 2001 confirmed Cache Creek as a major source contributing to mercury level spikes in the Sacramento River. Since then, multiple studies have been conducted to pinpoint the mines that are still releasing quicksilver, and the course the element has traveled to measure the extent of the issue. In 2004, the California Environmental Protection Agency published a staff report that acknowledged the continued increase of mercury in Cache Creek, and determined that 12 percent of the source were old mercury mines located near major tributaries such as: North Fork Cache Creek, Clear Lake outflow, Bear Creek, Harley Gulch, and Davis Creek. Reports like this led to protocols set in place to monitor the mercury levels within Cache Creek and warn the public of possible health concerns from fish consumption. In 2017, The Department of Environmental Science and Policy from UC Davis, in consultation with The Yolo County Cache Creek Technical Advisory Committee, proposed revisions to the existing protocols. The revision proposal called for yearly monitoring of off channel wet pits for five years, given they may explain additional sources of mercury within the creek. As well as a monitoring of these pits every other year for 10 years once the reclamation process is completed

== Wildlife and recreation ==
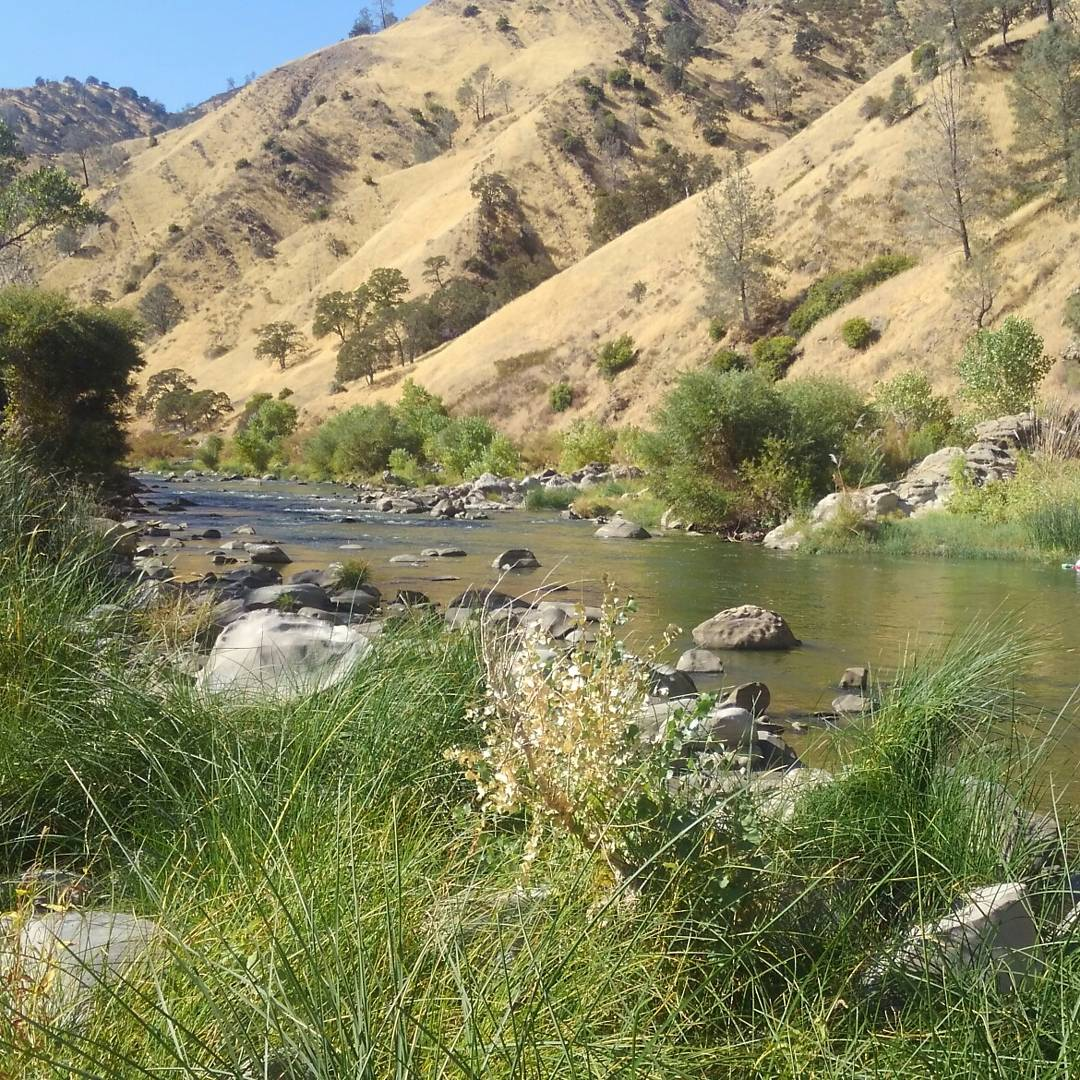
Cache Creek, Upper Yolo County section, California

A large part of the creek within Lake County is designated a Wildlife Area by the state of California and the federal Bureau of Land Management, on which vehicles are prohibited but hiking, primitive camping, and hunting are allowed. The North Fork and Bear Creek each host a growing population of the rare tule elk, plus winter populations of bald eagles. The ruggedness of the area tends to ensure its isolation from human activity. In 2006 the United States Congress designated 27,245 acres (110 km^{2}) of the area as the federally protected Cache Creek Wilderness. Cache Creek Conservancy has restored a 130-acre Cache Creek Nature Preserve area downstream in the watershed.

Whitewater boating on Cache Creek includes kayaking, rafting, canoeing and innertubing which are popular in the summer using the water released from the dams for downstream agriculture.

Nominally a tributary of the Sacramento River, Cache Creek now only reaches it during extremely wet years due to damming and diversion of the stream's water. Degradation of the channel caused by invasive plants, such as Arundo donax and Tamarix spp., as well as gravel mining has left no suitable habitat for Chinook salmon and steelhead to spawn, even if there is enough water. Consequently, there are no longer any anadromous fish species in Cache Creek.

== State Wild and Scenic River ==
Cache Creek was added to California's Wild and Scenic Rivers System in October 2005 which protects 31 miles (50 km) of the river from construction of new dams or diversions. Assembly member Lois Wolk introduced AB 1328 in 2005 which received support as well as opposition. New dam construction on Cache Creek was under consideration in 2002 by the Yolo County Water District, the agency that had built the Indian Valley Dam and the present dam on Cache Creek.

== See also ==
- List of rivers of California
- Rivers of Lake County, California
- Tributaries of the Sacramento River

== Notes ==
=== References ===
- Lake County Water Resources Division
- Yolo County Flood Control & Water Conservation District
- Cache Creek Bioregion Information from UC Davis
- Trust for Public Land (PDF)
- Cache Creek Natural Area BLM website
