= Olposel, California =

Olposel (also, Ol-po-sel) is a former Wintun settlement in Lake County, California, United States. It was located on Cache Creek; its precise location is unknown.
