= Indian Valley Reservoir =

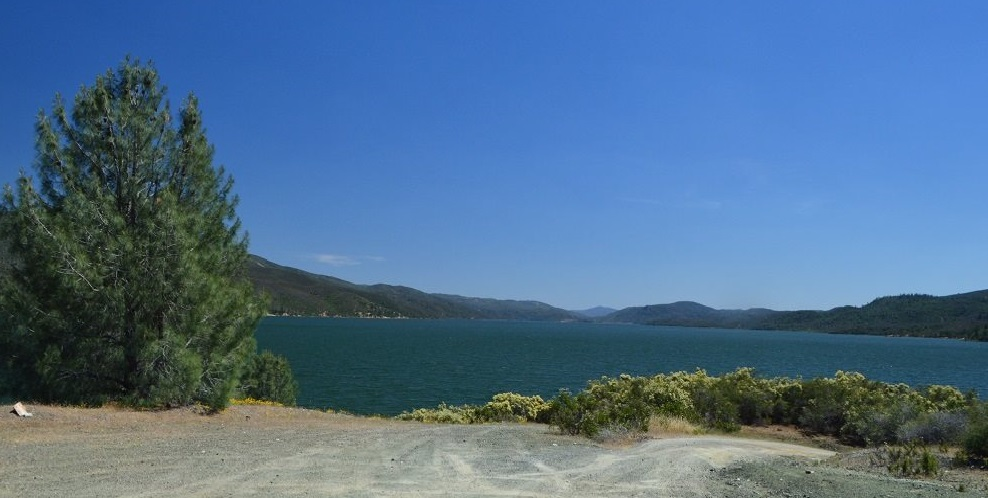

- Location within California Location within the United States
- Location: Lake County, California, United States
- Coordinates: 39°04′50″N 122°32′05″W
- Lake type: Reservoir
- Primary inflows: North Fork of Cache Creek; Stanton Creek
- Primary outflows: North Fork of Cache Creek
- Catchment area: 122 sq mi (320 km^{2})
- Basin countries: United States
- Managing agency: Yolo County Flood Control & Water Conservation District
- Max. length: 10 km (6.2 mi)
- Max. width: 2 km (1.2 mi)
- Surface area: 4,000 acres (1,600 ha)
- Water volume: 301,000 acre⋅ft (371,000,000 m^{3})
- Shore length^{1}: 35 km (22 mi)
- Surface elevation: 433 m (1,421 ft)
- Website: ycfcwcd.org/indian-valley-reservoir/
- References: U.S. Geological Survey Geographic Names Information System: Indian Valley Reservoir
- ^{1} Shore length is not a well-defined measure.

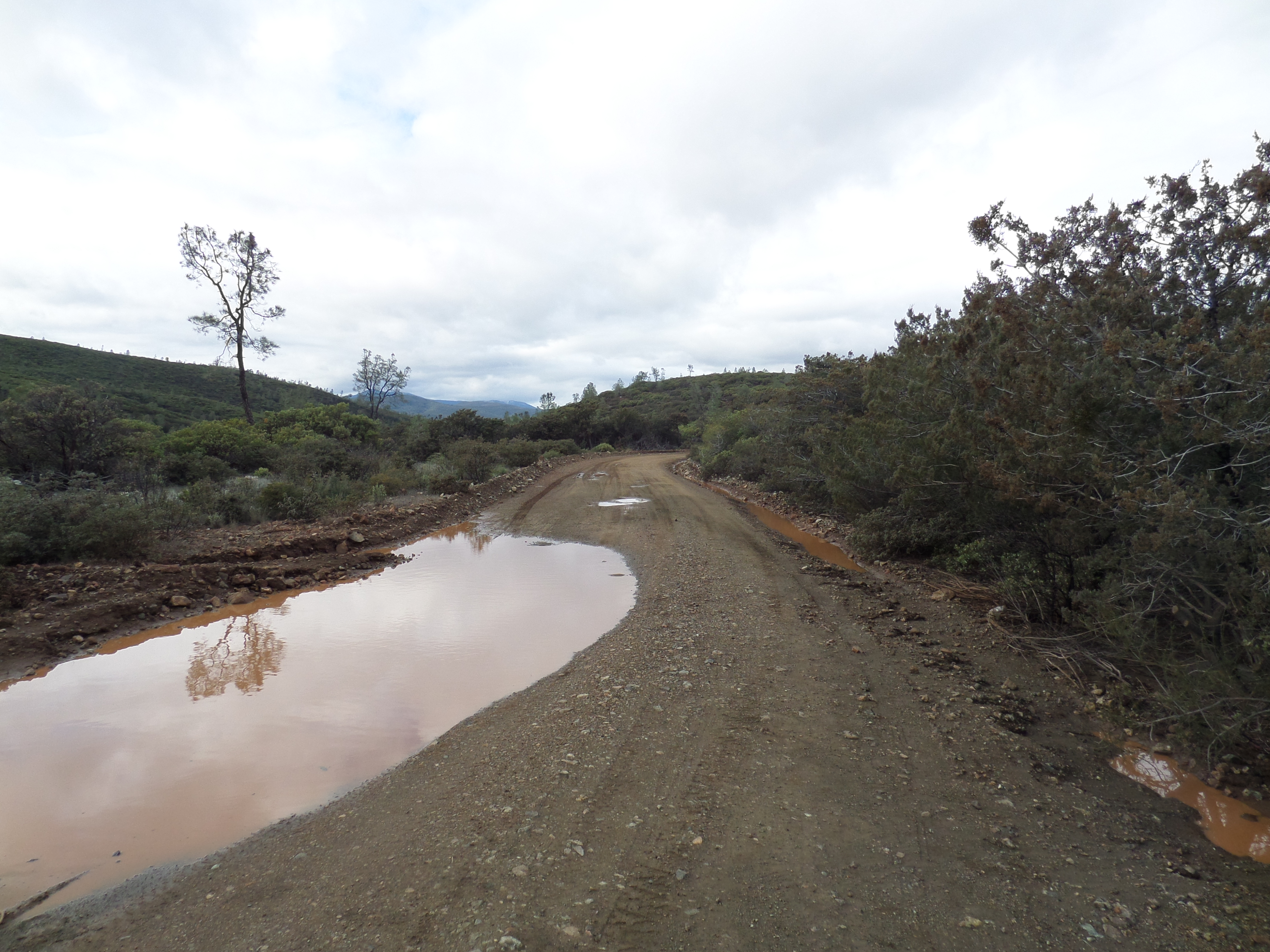
Bartlett Springs Road near Indian Valley Reservoir. January 2016.

Indian Valley Reservoir is a human-made lake in Lake County, California, 27 miles (43 km) west of Williams, United States, near State Route 20.

The 301,000 acre⋅ft (371,000,000 m^{3}) capacity reservoir was created by the construction of the Indian Valley Dam across the north fork of Cache Creek in 1975 (51 years ago). The 965 ft (294 m) long and 201 ft (61 m) high earth-fill dam was built for water storage, irrigation and flood control. Although the reservoir is in Lake County, it was built by neighboring Yolo County, which owns all water rights to the 300,600 acre-feet (370,800,000 m^{3}) of water. The dam includes a hydroelectric plant. The cost of the dam and reservoir exceeded $9 million and were funded in part by two bond issues.

== Recreation area ==
The reservoir is in the Bureau of Land Management's Walker Ridge Recreation Area. All types of recreation are allowed, including boating, camping, fishing, hunting, hiking, bicycling and horseback riding.

There are two primitive boat/hike-in campgrounds, Blue Oaks and Kowalski.

The area's flora and fauna include manzanita, oak and pine trees, blacktail deer, black bear, and wild turkey. Rare plants such as the Indian Valley Brodiaea and Adobe lily grow here.

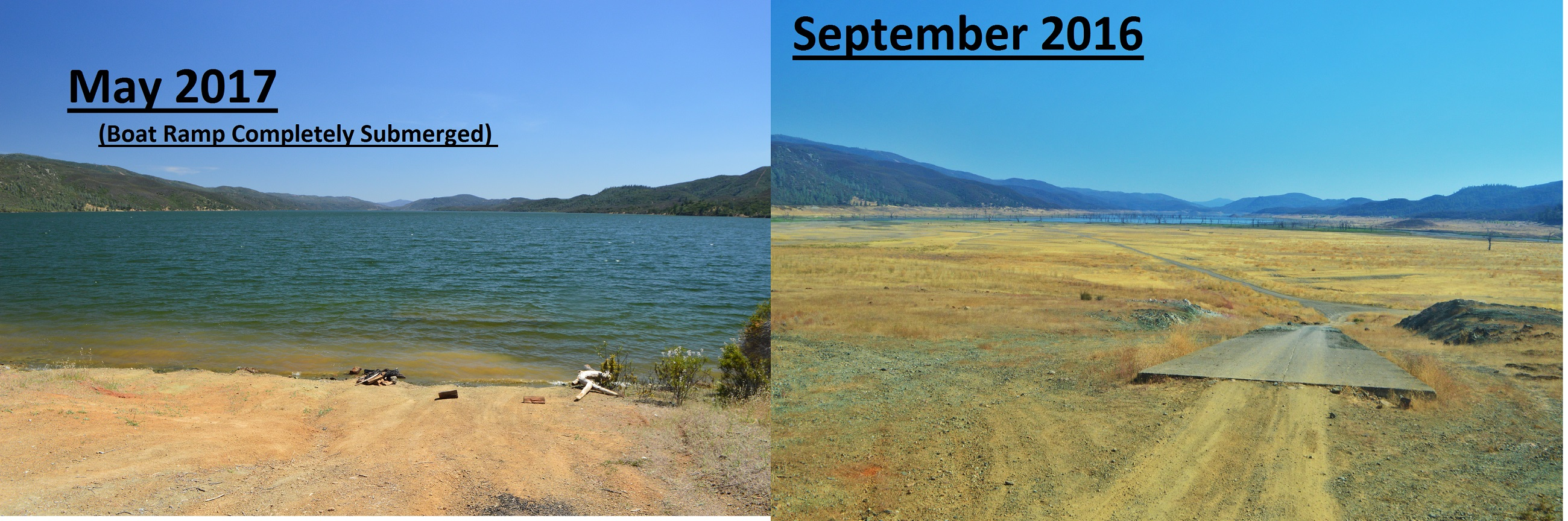
Fluctuations in water level vary by year as seen at the boat ramp at the northern end of the lake.

== See also ==
- List of dams and reservoirs in California
- List of lakes in California
- List of lakes in Lake County, California
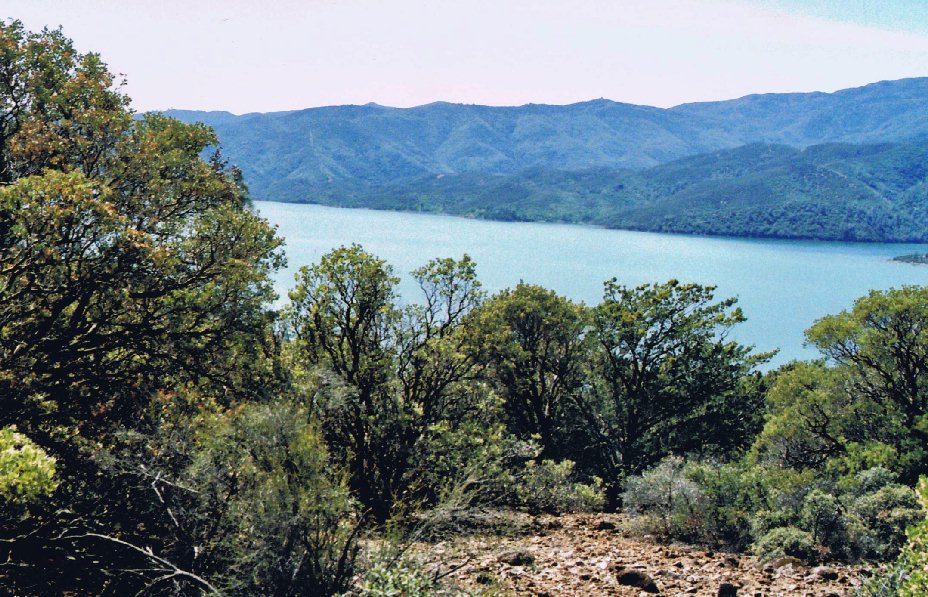
- List of largest reservoirs of California
- List of power stations in California
