= Bear Valley Buttes =

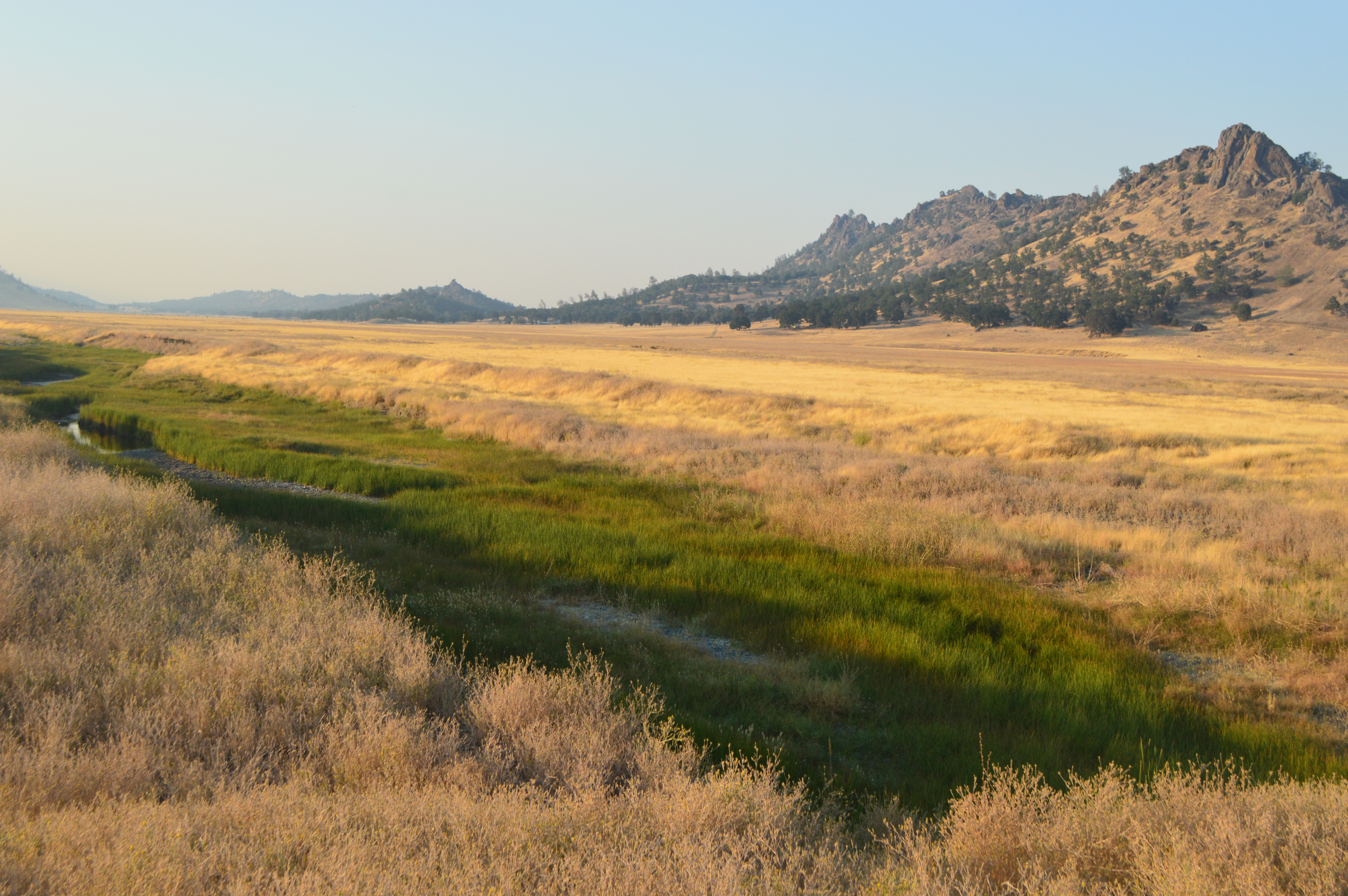

Highest point
- Elevation: 2,166 ft (660 m)

Geography
- Location: Colusa County, California, United States
- Parent range: Inner Coast Ranges

Geology
- Rock age: 150 Million Years
- Mountain type: Butte
- Rock types: Sedimentary and Great Valley Sequence

Bear Valley Buttes is a geologic feature that overlooks Bear Valley in Colusa County, California. The Buttes are approximately 1.5 miles long and its highest peak stands at 2,166 ft (660 m) above sea level. The Buttes are composed of the upturned marine sediments of the Great Valley Sequence that once formerly made up the floor of the Central Valley.
