= Wilbur Hot Springs =

Thermal springs and nature reserve in California

- Simmons Hot Springs; Wilbur Hot Sulphur Springs
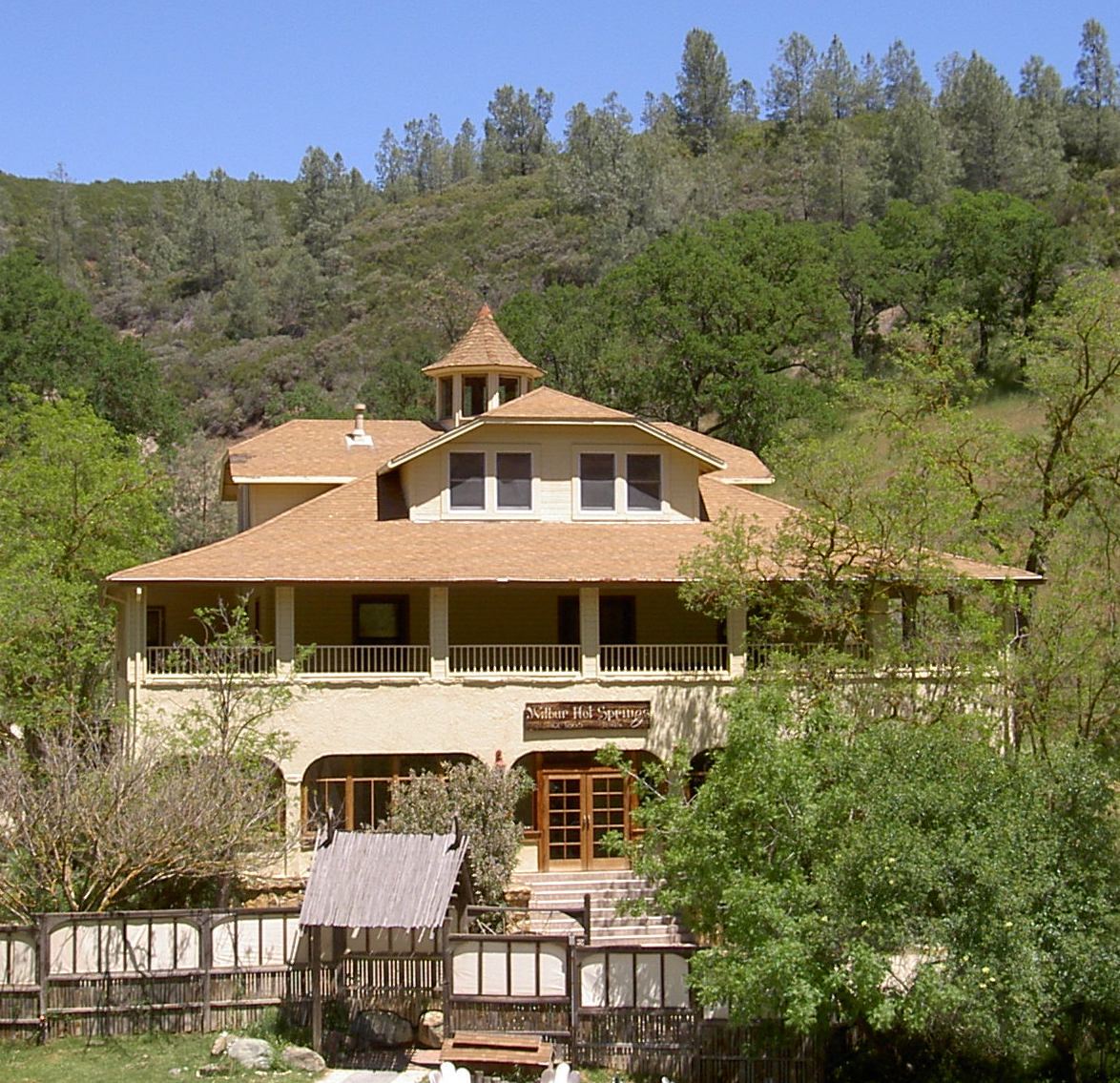
- The lodge at Wilbur Hot Springs
- Interactive map of Wilbur Hot Springs
- Location: near the town of Williams, California, Colusa County
- Coordinates: 39°2′19″N 122°25′15″W
- Elevation: 1,350 feet (410 m)
- Type: geothermal
- Temperature: 152 °F (67 °C)

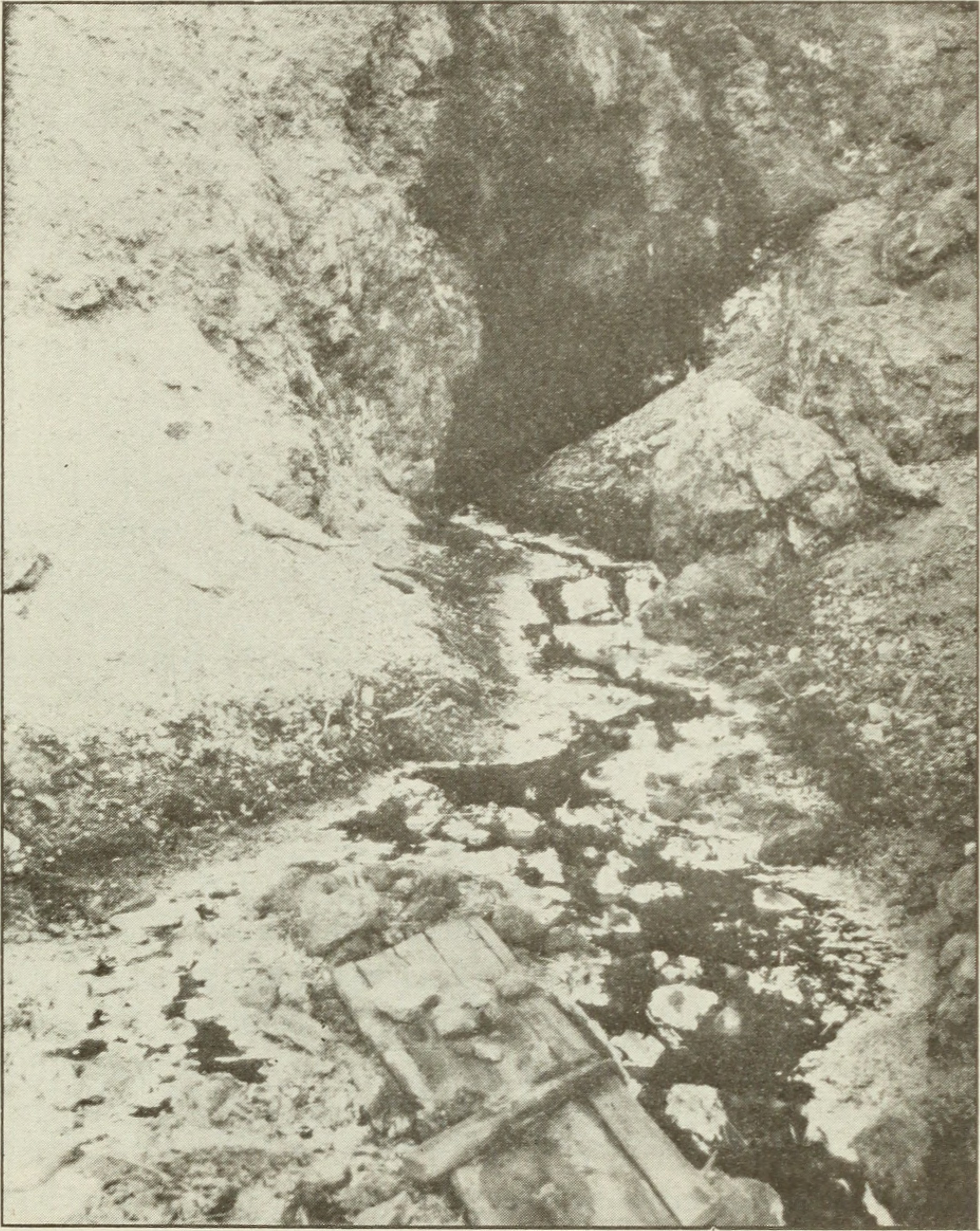
Hot salino-sulphurated water emerging from the Elgin Mine at the head of Sulphur Creek

Wilbur Hot Springs, formerly known as Simmons Hot Springs, is a naturally occurring historic hot spring approximately 22 miles west of Williams, Colusa County, in northern California, United States. It is about two hours by car northeast of the San Francisco Bay Area, near the junction of State Routes 16 and 20. It was developed as a spa in the 19th century, and since its acquisition in the 1970s by therapist Richard Louis Miller, has been operated as a spa resort and personal retreat. The adjacent valley was added to the property as a nature reserve protected by covenant.

== Characteristics and water profile ==
The group of hot springs emerge from the source near Sulphur Creek and Bear Creek. with a flow rate of about 30 gallons per minute. The water temperature ranges from 140 degrees to 152 °F (67 °C). It is at an elevation of 1,350 feet (410 m). Other mineral deposits adjacent to the hot springs include gold, silver, mercury, antimony, thallium, and arsenic as reported by Pearcy and Petersen (1990).

Historically, quicksilver (mercury) mining occurred in the area in considerable operations, the closest mercury mine being the Elgin Mine. The multiple mercury and sulfur deposits in the hot spring area are due to volcanic processes and magma below the surface. Other minerals mined at the Sulphur Creek, approximately one mile upstream from Wilbur Springs, include gold, copper, and sulfur.

The spring water is highly sulphurated. A 1911 report by the United States Geological Survey states that Spring No. 1 is a hot sulphurated spring issuing from a source on the land formerly owned by the Manzanita Mining Company. East of the main source, warm seeps can be found. Spring No. 10, also known as Black Sulphur Spring, is located 500 yards west of the Wilbur Hotel, and to the east of Spring No. 1. Spring No. 22, also known as the Main Springs, is located 200 yards west of the hotel establishment and discharged at a rate of 21 gallons per minute (30,000 gallons per day). The color of the water as it emerges from the Main Springs is clear yellow due to alkaline sulphides. The 1911 report describes separate men's and women's mud bath houses, located near the Chromatic Spring. The water of the Chromatic Spring fluctuated between reddish purple to bright green to black due to the presence of algae species and mineral content. Spring No. 20 also known as the Catarrh and Complexion Spring emerges from its source located 360 feet east of the Main Springs; the water is highly saline and sulphurated. Spring No. 24, is also known as the Cold Magnesia Spring, and Spring No. 26 is a cold sulfur spring. Spring No. 30, known as the Cold Black Sulphur Spring, is located approximately 375 feet east of the hotel.

By 1976, 12 active springs were reportedly flowing at Wilbur Hot Springs, according to the U.S. Department of Energy's Division of Geothermal Energy.

While the mineral content differs from spring to spring, overall, the minerals of the spring system recorded in the early 20th century include sodium potassium, lithium, ammonium, calcium, magnesium, iron, aluminum, sulphate, nitrate, chloride, bromide, iodide, silica, metabolite; gasses include carbon dioxide and hydrogen sulphide. The resort website lists chloride, carbonic acid, sulphate, silicate, lithium, manganese, zinc, sodium, potassium, boron, magnesium, calcium and cadmium based on a report from the USGS.

- Temperature: 152 °F (67 °C)
- Flow: 30 gpm (114 L/min)
- Capacity: 0.6 million Btu/hr / 0.2 MWt
- Annual Energy: 4.7 billion Btu/yr / 1.4 GWh/yr
- Load Factor: 0.89
- Delta T: 40 °F (4 °C)

== Resort ==
Wilbur Hot Springs is operated as a spa resort on 1,700 acres (690 ha), including a 1,560-acre (630 ha) nature reserve. The property includes a geyser that erupts hourly. Guest accommodations include the lodge, a 3-story hotel dating to 1915, and also cabins and camping sites. The water from the hot springs is cooled for bathing; the resort also offers cool springs, saunas, yoga, and massages. There are two dining rooms and a library. The resort is reached via a dirt road and is off-grid, powered by solar panels.

As of 2018, Wilbur Hot Springs resort is the sole remaining business in the Sulphur Creek Mining District.

== History ==
Before European settlers came, the Native American inhabitants of the Coast Range made use of the springs as ceremonial and healing grounds, in particular the Yocha Dehe tribe of the Wintun Nation. Other Indigenous inhabitants of the region that used the springs include the Patwin, Pomo, and Colusi. According to local lore, wealthy social activist and congressman General John Bidwell was searching for gold in 1863 when one of his men became extremely ill. Local Native Americans told him about the hot springs; Bidwell's man recovered, and Bidwell spread word of the spring's healing properties in San Francisco and in Chico, where he owned a well known farm.

Throughout America in the late 19th century, hot springs became very popular among those who could afford the often long and arduous journeys and the cost of staying at fashionable resorts. Colusa County had a number of hot spring resorts, reached by stage coach.

European settlers were first attracted to the Wilbur Hot Springs area because of minerals in the ground, rather than the water. In 1863, mercury and gold were found near the springs, then known as Simmon's Hot Springs. A hotel was built on the site, that later burned. That year Ezekial Wilbur and Edwin Howell purchased a 640-acre (2.6 km^{2}) ranch for $1,500. Formed to mine copper along Sulphur Creek, their partnership was soon disbanded when copper ore proved difficult to treat and decreased in value. Within eight months, Wilbur purchased Howell's share of the property for $200, built a wood-frame hotel, and announced the opening of Wilbur Hot Sulphur Springs in 1865. Later that year, Wilbur Hot Sulphur Springs was sold to Marcus Marcuse of Marysville. Meanwhile, the reputation of the "miraculous cures" of Sulphur Creek continued to grow. By the 1880s, Wilbur Springs was known for the curative properties of its scalding hot springs that boiled up over an area of 100 square feet (9.3 m^{2}). Guests traveled on the Southern Pacific Railroad to Williams, then covered the last 26 miles (42 km) to the springs by stage coach. However, the hotel at Wilbur Springs was destroyed by fire in 1870, and by 1891 the spa's fortunes were in decline due to an absentee owner and a better property a mile down the road at Sulphur Creek Village. The facilities were neglected and the hotel "ramshackle".

In 1915, the cabins were razed by the then owner, J. W. Cuthbert, and replaced with a two-story hotel, built in 1918, one of the first poured concrete buildings in California. Through the decades, the property continued to change hands, first to the Barker family (supposedly of Ma and Pa Barker fame) and then to the Sutcliff family. In 1968, when the owner was Mildred Sutliffe, a visitor wrote, "The old hotel looks like an excellent candidate for a bonfire, and the baths are little more than rabbit hutches."

Wilbur Hot Springs was purchased in 1972 by Richard Louis Miller, a Gestalt therapist who relocated his San Francisco clinic there. He renovated the facilities, adding a third floor to the hotel building, and opened the resort to the public in 1974. In 1981 he started Cokenders Alcohol and Drug program, a pioneering non-institutional addiction treatment program, which took over the hotel for one week a month. In 1990, he bought the adjoining valley, which had been used for hunting, and placed a conservation easement on it, creating a nature reserve. The Wilbur Hot Springs Institute for Ecology and Health previously operated on the property. The remote resort—for much of the 20th century, the hotel was its own post office, and electric lighting was first introduced in 1993—became known for clothing-optional co-ed bathing. In 1993 a New York Times travel writer described the hotel as "feel[ing] like a college campus, circa 1968", with guests required to bring their own food and drinking water and cooking meals collectively, quiet hours from 10:00 to 10:00, a single guest telephone in the parking lot, and showers across the driveway. There were then 19 guest rooms and a top-floor 18-bed dormitory.

In March 2014, the lodge building was severely damaged by fire. The resort was temporarily closed for repairs, but reopened in January 2015 and was further restored in 2016.

In 2019, Miller offered the property for sale; according to the listing, there were then 25 bedrooms and 16 bathrooms. The sale was finalized in February 2020. In July 2024 the resort was evacuated as a precaution because of the Ridge Fire.

== Climate ==
The Köppen Climate Classification subtype for this climate is "Csa". (Mediterranean Climate).

Climate data for Williams
Month	Jan	Feb	Mar	Apr	May	Jun	Jul	Aug	Sep	Oct	Nov	Dec	Year
Mean daily maximum °C (°F)	12 (54)	16 (61)	19 (66)	23 (73)	28 (82)	33 (91)	36 (97)	35 (95)	32 (89)	26 (79)	18 (65)	13 (55)	24 (76)
Mean daily minimum °C (°F)	−1 (31)	4 (39)	5 (41)	7 (45)	11 (52)	14 (58)	16 (60)	14 (58)	13 (55)	9 (48)	5 (41)	2 (36)	8 (47)
Average precipitation mm (inches)	79 (3.1)	66 (2.6)	51 (2)	23 (0.9)	10 (0.4)	5.1 (0.2)	0 (0)	2.5 (0.1)	10 (0.4)	20 (0.8)	53 (2.1)	71 (2.8)	390 (15.3)
Average precipitation days	8	7	7	4	2	1	0	0	1	3	6	8	47
Source: Weatherbase

== See also ==
- List of hot springs in the United States
