= Capay, California =

Unincorporated community in California, United States

Capay
- Unincorporated community
- Location in California
- Coordinates: 38°42′28″N 122°02′53″W
- Country: United States
- State: California
- County: Yolo
- Elevation: 210 ft (64 m)
- ZIP code: 95607
- Area code: 530
- GNIS feature ID: 220568

Capay (Wintun: Kapai, meaning "Stream") is an unincorporated community in Yolo County, California, United States. It is located on Cache Creek 2 miles (3.2 km) west-northwest of Esparto, in the Capay Valley, in the northwestern part of the county. Capay's ZIP Code is 95607 and its area code 530. It lies at an elevation of 210 feet (64 m).

== History ==
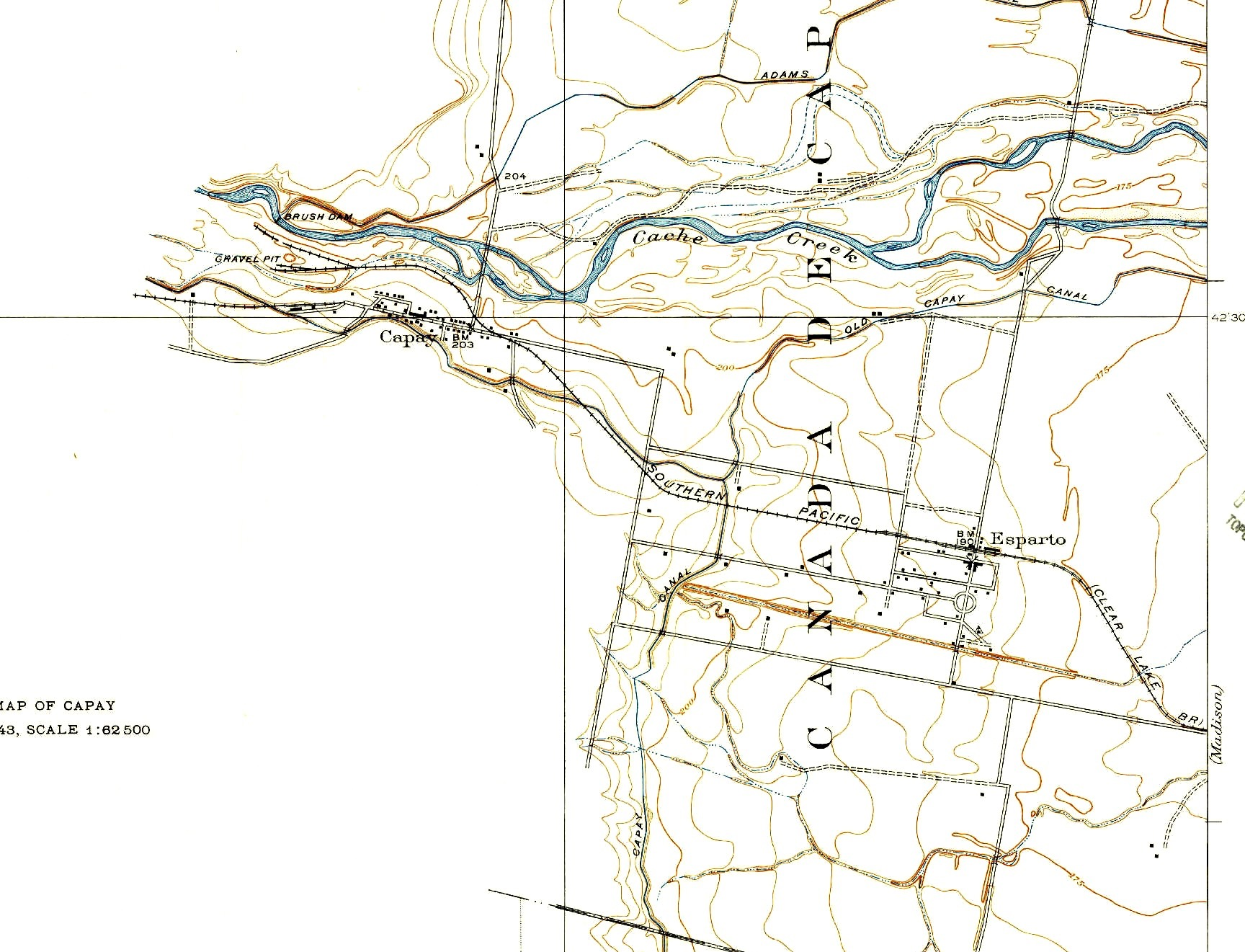
Rumsey Branch of SP in 1905 at Capay and Esparto

Capay is located on the Mexican land grant Rancho Cañada de Capay. Capay was originally named Munchville after one of the first white settlers, a man named Munch, who built a house on the Cache Creek at the site in 1857. Mr. Empyre and Mr. Munch built a two-story building in the area. The town acquired the name Langville after John A. Lang. In 1870, Lang operated a hotel and owned a brick yard and a store. Langville grew enough to have a town plat filed on January 1, 1875, which renamed the town as Capay.

A post office opened in Capay in 1868.

== Climate ==
This region experiences hot, dry summers and cool, wet winters. According to the Köppen Climate Classification system, Capay has a typical Mediterranean climate, abbreviated "Csa" on climate maps.
