= Richard Louis Miller =

American psychologist

Richard Miller
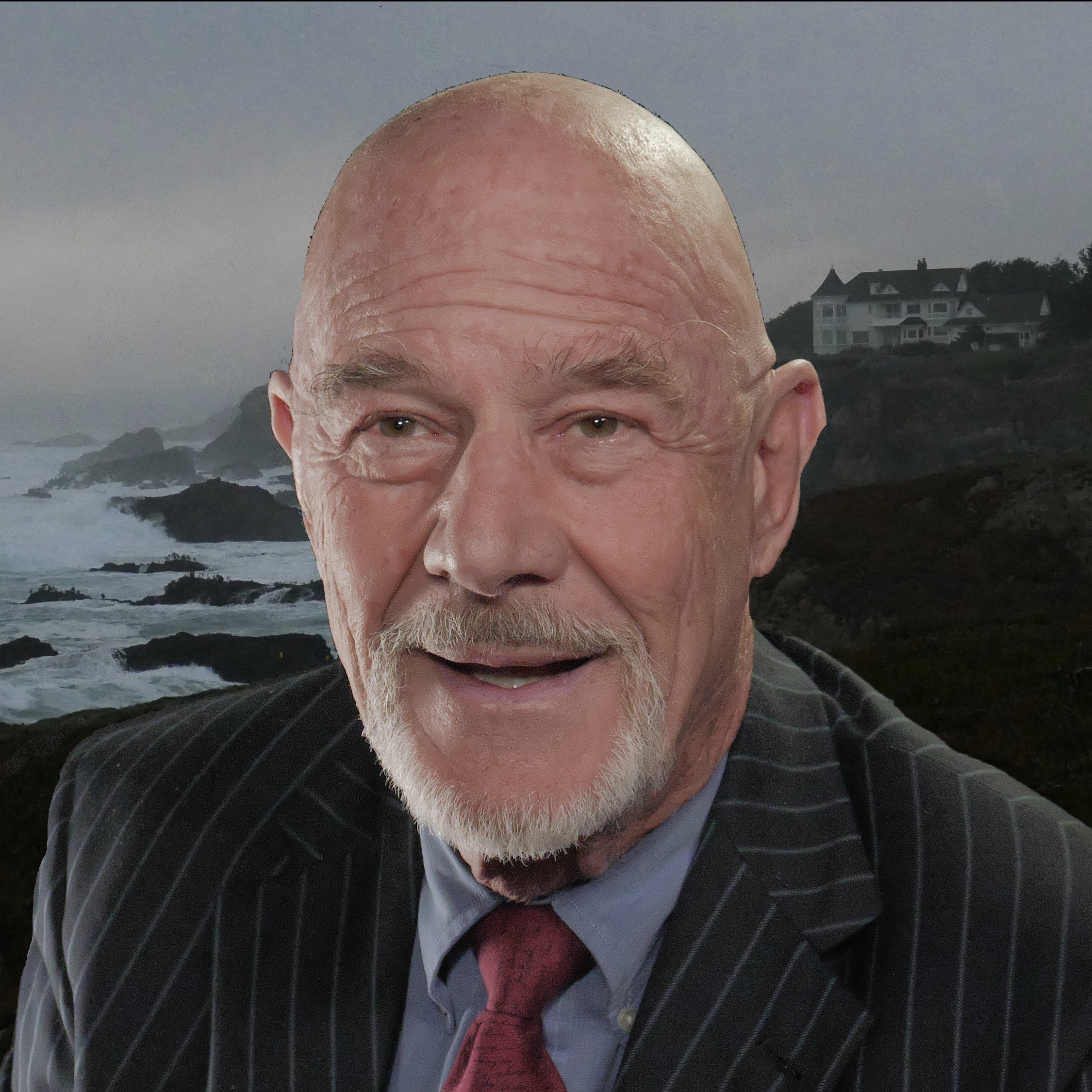
- Born: United States
- Education: University of Michigan
- Scientific career
- Fields: Clinical Psychology

Richard Louis Miller is an American clinical psychologist, author, social media influencer and Internet Radio Host. He is the founder of Wilbur Hot Springs Health Sanctuary and Cokenders Alcohol and Drug Program. He hosts the Mind Body Health & Politics internet broadcast which previously aired on NPR affiliate KZYX & Z radio.

== History ==
Miller founded The Health Sanctuary at Wilbur Hot Springs, a health maintenance facility.

Miller's approaches were the subject of the book Gestalting Addiction.

Miller co-authored a weekly news column in the San Francisco Chronicle, while co-hosting a weekly syndicated radio program.

Miller is the founder of Cokenders Alcohol and Drug Program, which performs rehabilitation.

== Radio Program and Podcast ==
Miller has hosted a weekly internet broadcast "Mind Body Health & Politics, for the past twenty years." on his website MindBodyHealthpolitics.org. The program formerly aired on NPR affiliate KZYX & Z radio in Mendocino County. In November 2020, Miller re-launched the program as an internet radio broadcast.

== Selected publications ==
- Psychedelic Medicine (2017)
- Psychedelic Wisdom (2022)
- Integral Psychedelic Therapy: The Non-Ordinary Art of Psychospiritual Healing (2023)
- Freeing Sexuality (2023)
