= Bear Creek (Colusa County) =

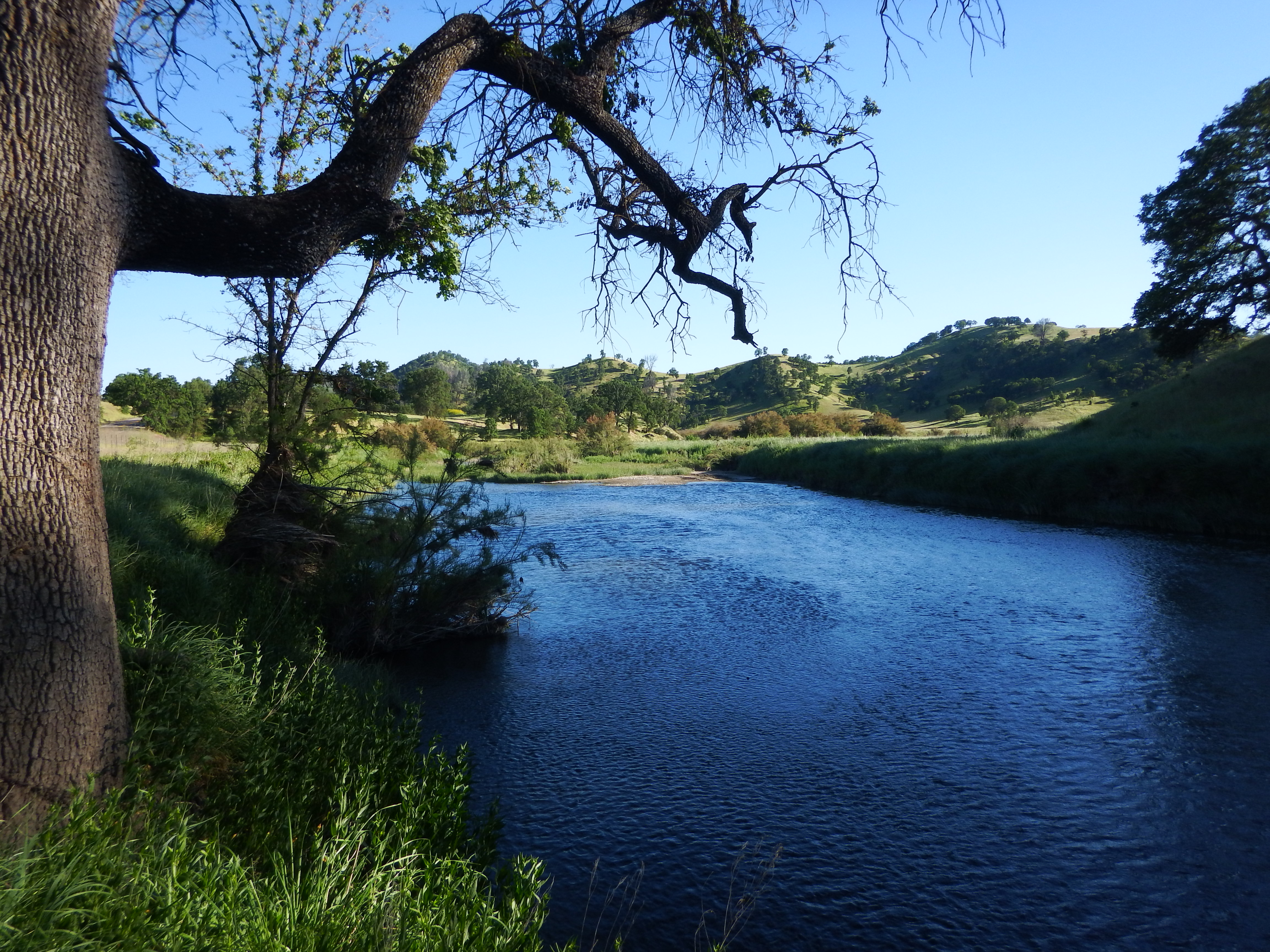
- Bear Creek as it flows through the Bureau of Land Management's Cache Creek Natural Area

- Location of the river mouth in California

Location
- Country: United States
- State: California
- Region: Colusa County (Cache Creek Watershed)

Physical characteristics
- Source: Mill Creek (Mendocino National Forest)
  - elevation: 3,830 ft (1,170 m)
- 2nd source: Bear Creek
  - elevation: 2,212 ft (674 m)
- Source confluence: Bear Valley
  - elevation: 1,331 ft (406 m)
- Mouth: Cache Creek
  - location: Cache Creek Canyon
  - coordinates: 38°55′35″N 122°20′0″W
  - elevation: 641 ft (195 m)
- Length: 30 mi (48 km)
- Basin size: 130 sq mi (340 km^{2})
- Discharge
  - location: Holsten Chimney Canyon Stream Gauge, CA
  - average: 37.5 cu ft/s (1.06 m^{3}/s)
  - minimum: 0 cu ft/s (0 m^{3}/s)
  - maximum: 8,510 cu ft/s (241 m^{3}/s)

Basin features
- Tributaries
  - left: Sulphur Creek, Trout Creek

Bear Creek is one of two primary tributaries to Cache Creek in the U.S. state of California, the other being the North Fork of Cache Creek. It is the only tributary to Cache Creek not impounded by a dam; the North Fork is impounded by Indian Valley Dam and Reservoir, while the Cache Creek main stem is impounded by Cache Creek Dam.

Because of elevated mercury levels in fish, the California Office of Environmental Health Hazard Assessment recommends that no one eat fish or shellfish from this water body.

== Watershed ==
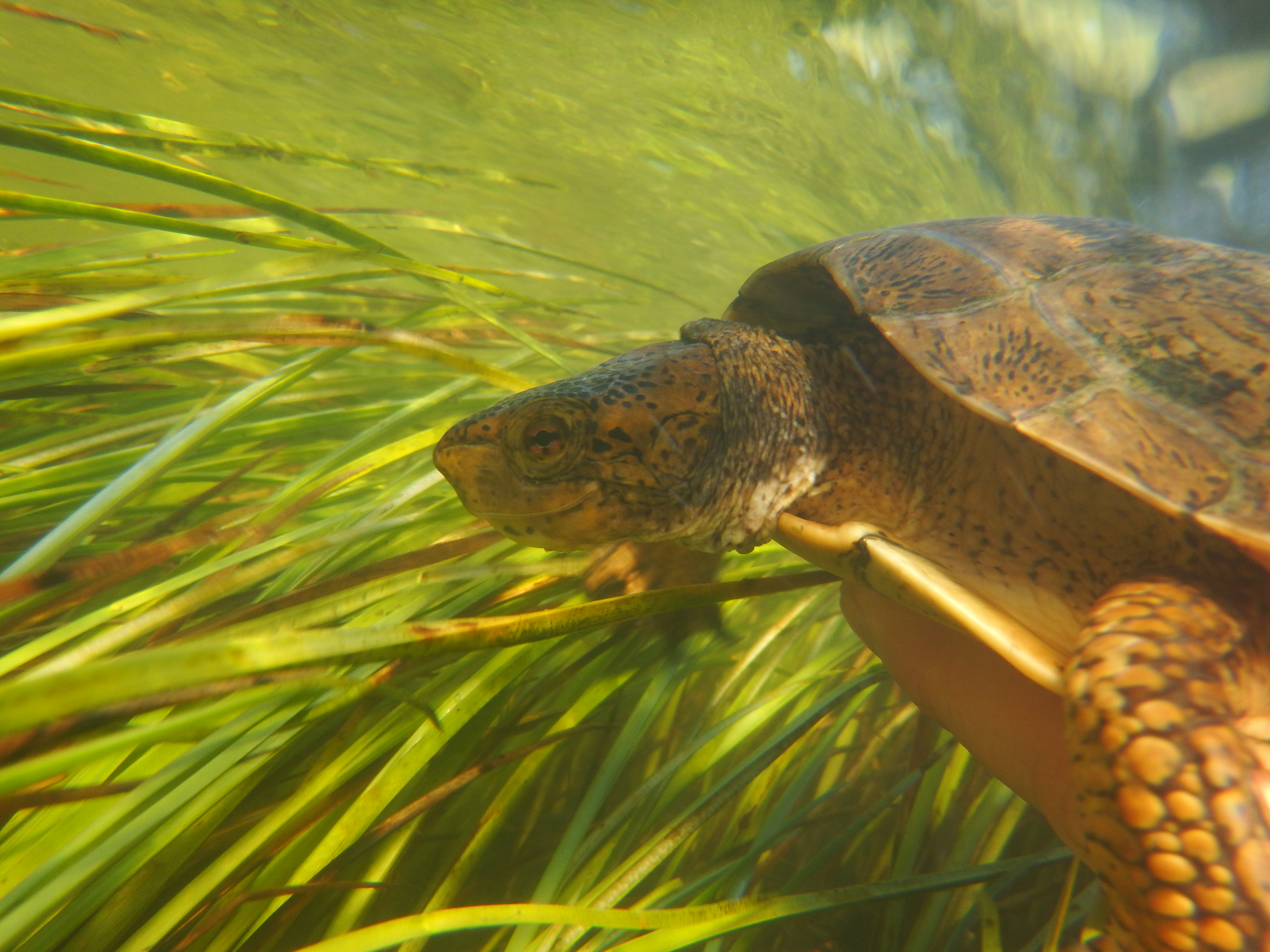
Western Pond Turtle in Bear Creek

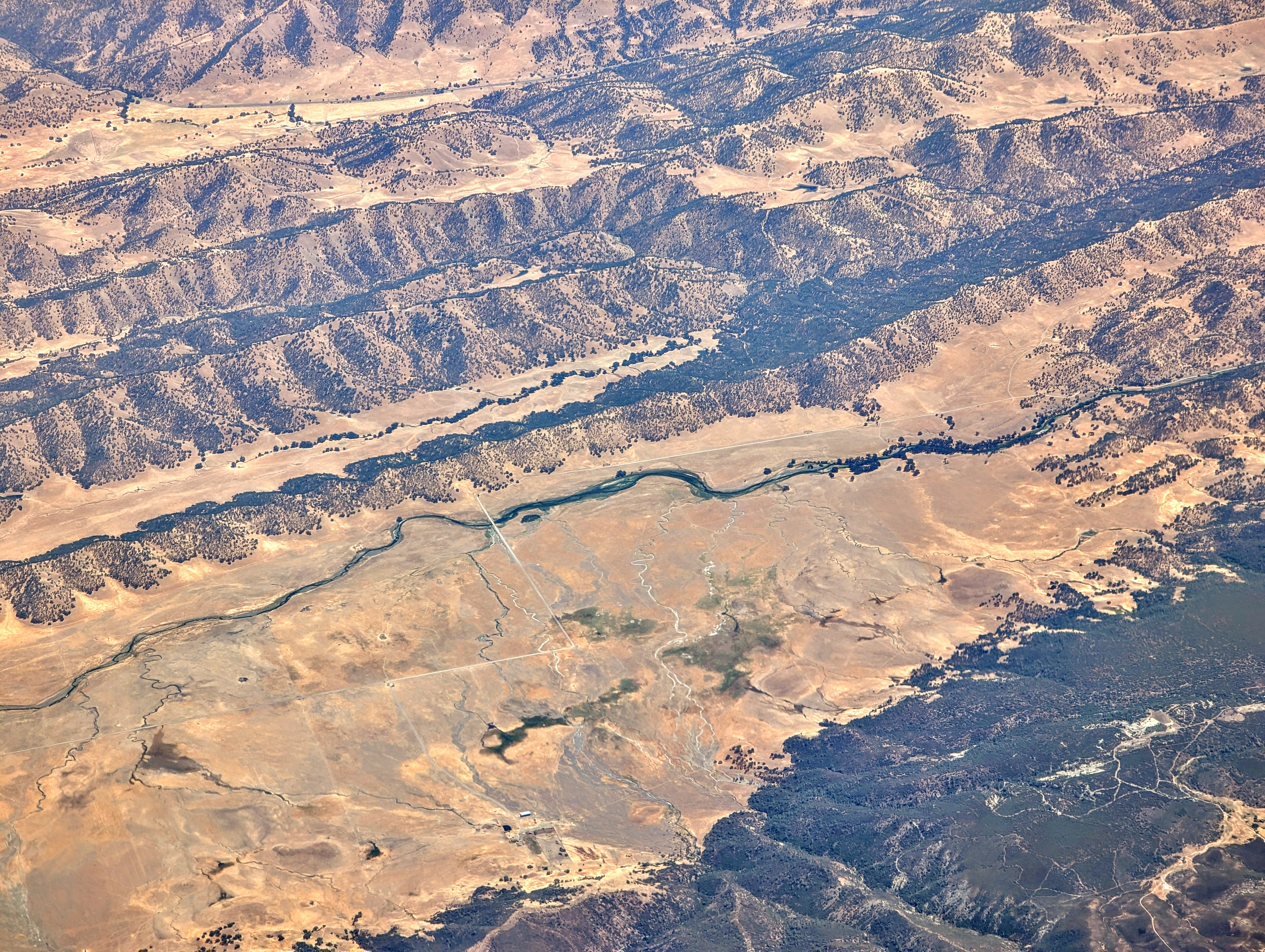
Aerial view of Bear Creek and Bear Valley Road from the west

Bear Creek begins within Bear Valley and flows south for approximately 25 miles draining a watershed of 130 square miles in the lower elevations of the Inner Coastal Range entirely in Colusa County. Bear Creek terminates at the confluence of Cache Creek just before crossing the Yolo County line in Cache Creek Canyon.

== Wildlife ==
Bear Creek provides a perennial habitat for fish to navigate throughout the year. By far the most common fish found in Bear Creek is the native California roach. The creek also provides habitat for a wide assortment of other creatures including amphibians such as the western pond turtle and other water-based organisms. Due to its perennial nature, Bear Creek also provides a reliable water supply to other creatures, thereby attracting large mammals such as deer and the Native California tule elk.
