= Bear Valley, Colusa County, California =

Bear Valley
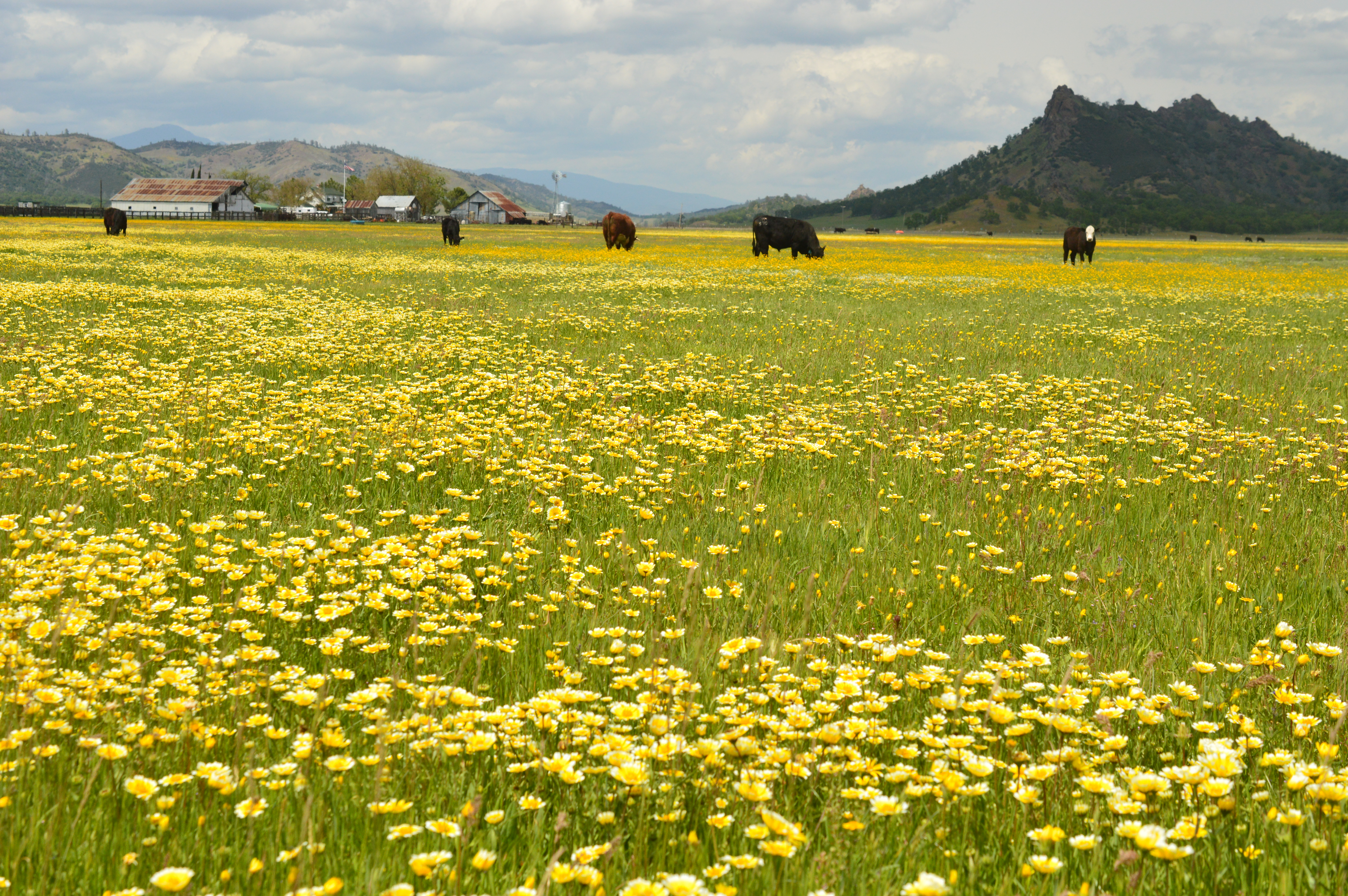
- Bear valley during Spring 2017 with Bear Valley Buttes in background

- Location within California
- Floor elevation: 1,310 ft (400 m)
- Length: 12.5 mi (20.1 km)

Geography
- Country: United States
- State: California
- Region: Colusa County
- Coordinates: 39.13805°N 122.43301°W
- Interactive map of Bear Valley

Bear Valley in Colusa County, California is formed by Bear Creek which is a tributary of Cache Creek.

Upstream in the Bear Creek watershed the creek flows for 10 miles through a broad flat valley that has spectacular displays of wildflowers in the spring.

The Bear Valley Ranch and Payne Ranch in Bear Valley have been permanently protected through a conservation easement that precludes development on the property, while permitting traditional cattle ranching to continue.

Hiking through the valley is not permitted, but many people visit Bear Valley and neighboring valleys each spring for roadside viewing of this wildflower hotspot.

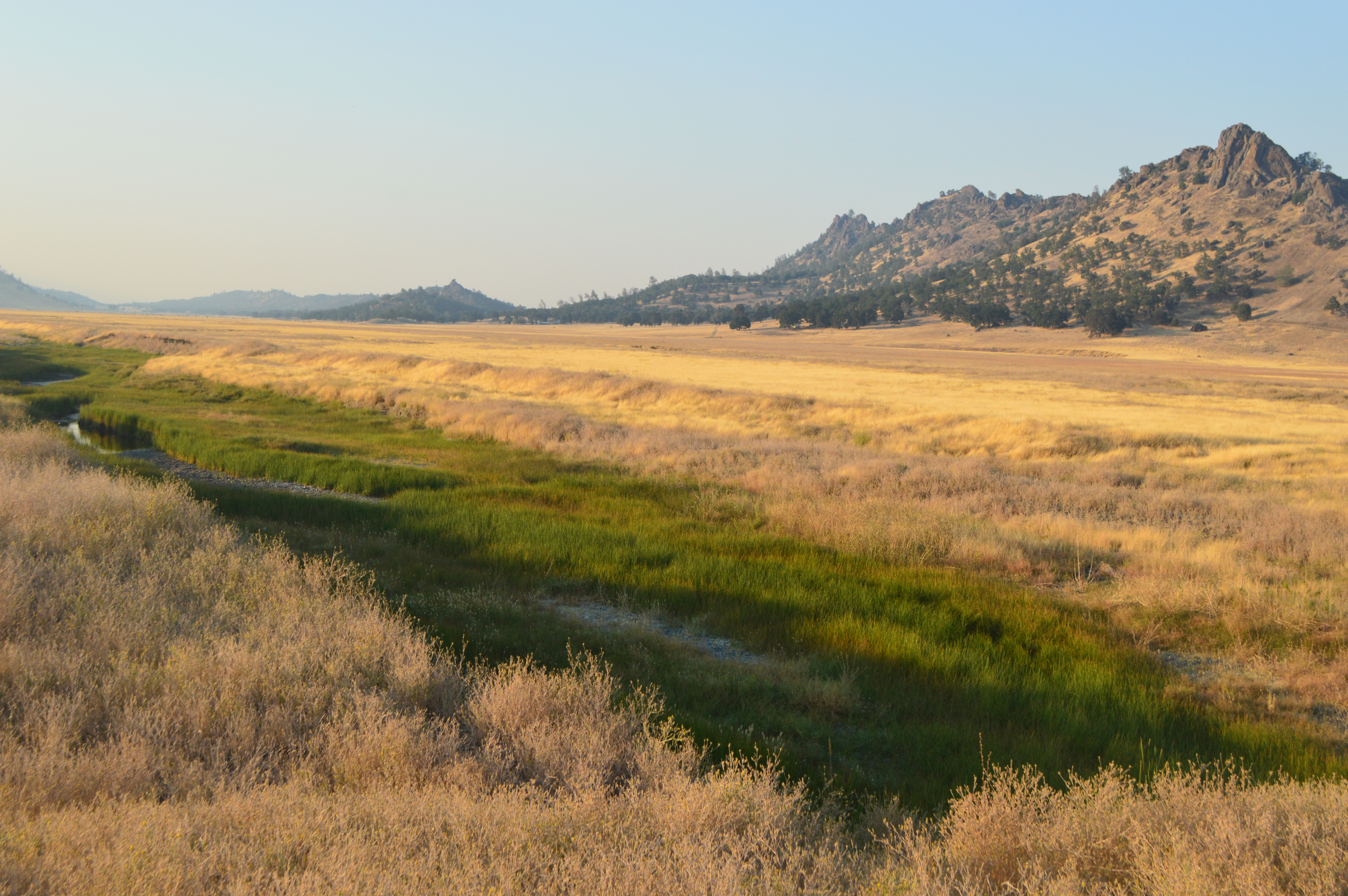
Bear Valley during the parched summer months with Bear Creek in center

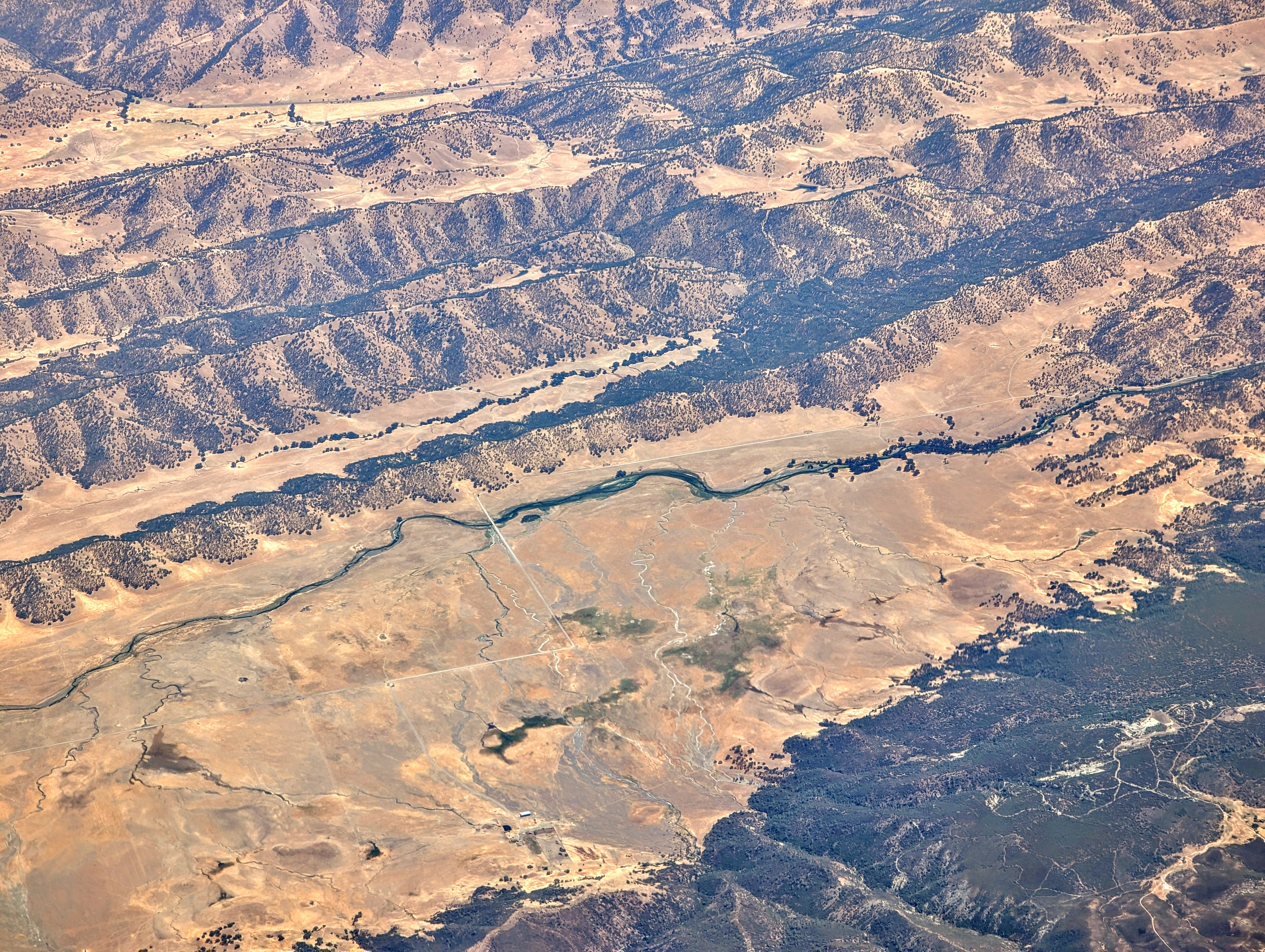
Aerial view of Bear Creek and Bear Valley Road from the west
