= Salt Creek (Sacramento River tributary) =

American stream

Coordinates: 40°08′49″N 122°09′15″W

Salt Creek is a stream in the U.S. state of California. The 18-mile (29 km) long stream is a tributary to the Sacramento River.

Salt Creek was named for the brine springs which empty into its headwaters.
