= California State Route 53 =

Highway in California

State Route 53

- SR 53 highlighted in red

Route information
- Maintained by Caltrans
- Length: 7.45 mi (11.99 km)

Major junctions
- South end: SR 29 at Lower Lake
- North end: SR 20 near Clearlake

Location
- Country: United States
- State: California
- Counties: Lake

Highway system
- State highways in California; Interstate; US; State; Scenic; History; Pre‑1964; Unconstructed; Deleted; Freeways
← SR 52	→ SR 54

State Route 53 (SR 53), also known as the Clearlake Expressway for part of its length, is a state highway in the U.S. state of California that runs in a north–south direction in Lake County east of Clear Lake, It connects SR 29 and SR 20 via the city of Clearlake.

== Route description ==
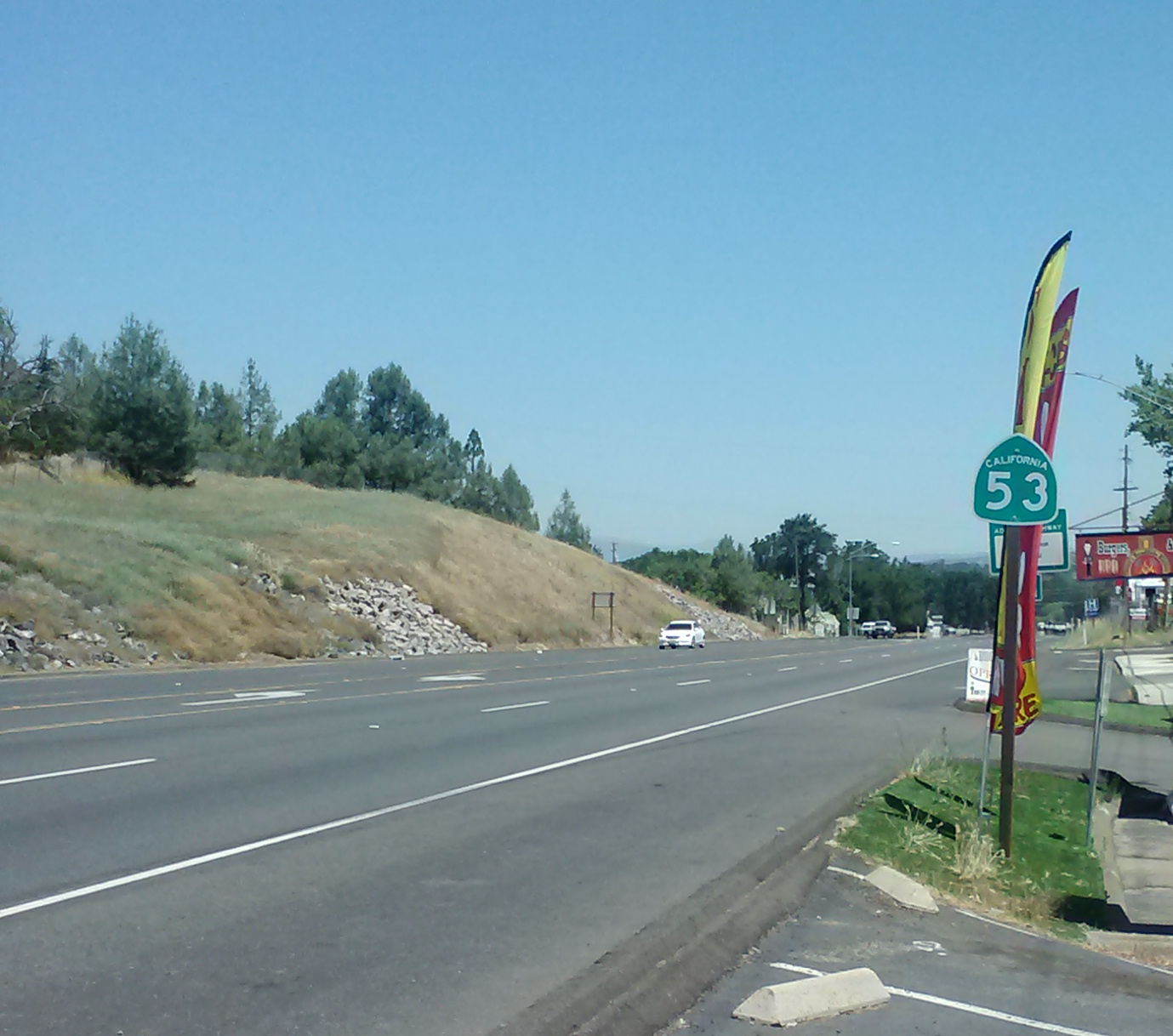
State Route 53 facing northbound in the town of Lower Lake, near its southern terminus

Route 53 is defined in section 353 of the California Streets and Highways Code, and that the highway is "from Route 29 to Route 20 via Clearlake."

SR 53 begins at California State Route 29 in the town of Lower Lake, near Anderson Marsh State Historic Park, primarily as a four-lane divided semi-rural expressway. The highway then heads northward along Clear Lake, the largest freshwater lake located entirely in California. It bypasses the center of Clearlake, California, instead going through the neighborhood of the "Avenues". Once it crosses Lakeshore Drive, it narrows down to a two-lane highway until its northern terminus at California State Route 20 north of the city limits.

State Route 53 is part of the California Freeway and Expressway System, and is part of the National Highway System, a network of highways that are considered essential to the country's economy, defense, and mobility by the Federal Highway Administration. SR 53 is eligible for the State Scenic Highway System, but it is not officially designated as a scenic highway by the California Department of Transportation.

== Major intersections ==
Except where prefixed with a letter, postmiles were measured on the road as it was in 1964, based on the alignment that existed at the time, and do not necessarily reflect current mileage. Postmile prefixes include: R reflecting a realignment in the route since then, M indicating a second realignment, L referring to an overlap due to a correction or change, and T indicating postmiles classified as temporary. Segments that remain unconstructed or have been relinquished to local control may be omitted. The entire route is in Lake County.

Location	Postmile	Destinations	Notes
Lower Lake	0.00	SR 29 (Lower Lake Road) / Morgan Valley Road – Lakeport, Middletown	South end of SR 53
Clearlake	1.47	Lakeshore Drive; Old State Highway	Former SR 53 north
Clearlake	2.96	Clearlake Highlands, 40th Avenue	Former SR 53 south
	7.45	SR 20 to US 101 – Williams, Clearlake Oaks, Northshore Resorts	North end of SR 53
1.000 mi = 1.609 km; 1.000 km = 0.621 mi
