= Emigrant Gap, California =

Unincorporated community in California, United States

- Unincorporated community
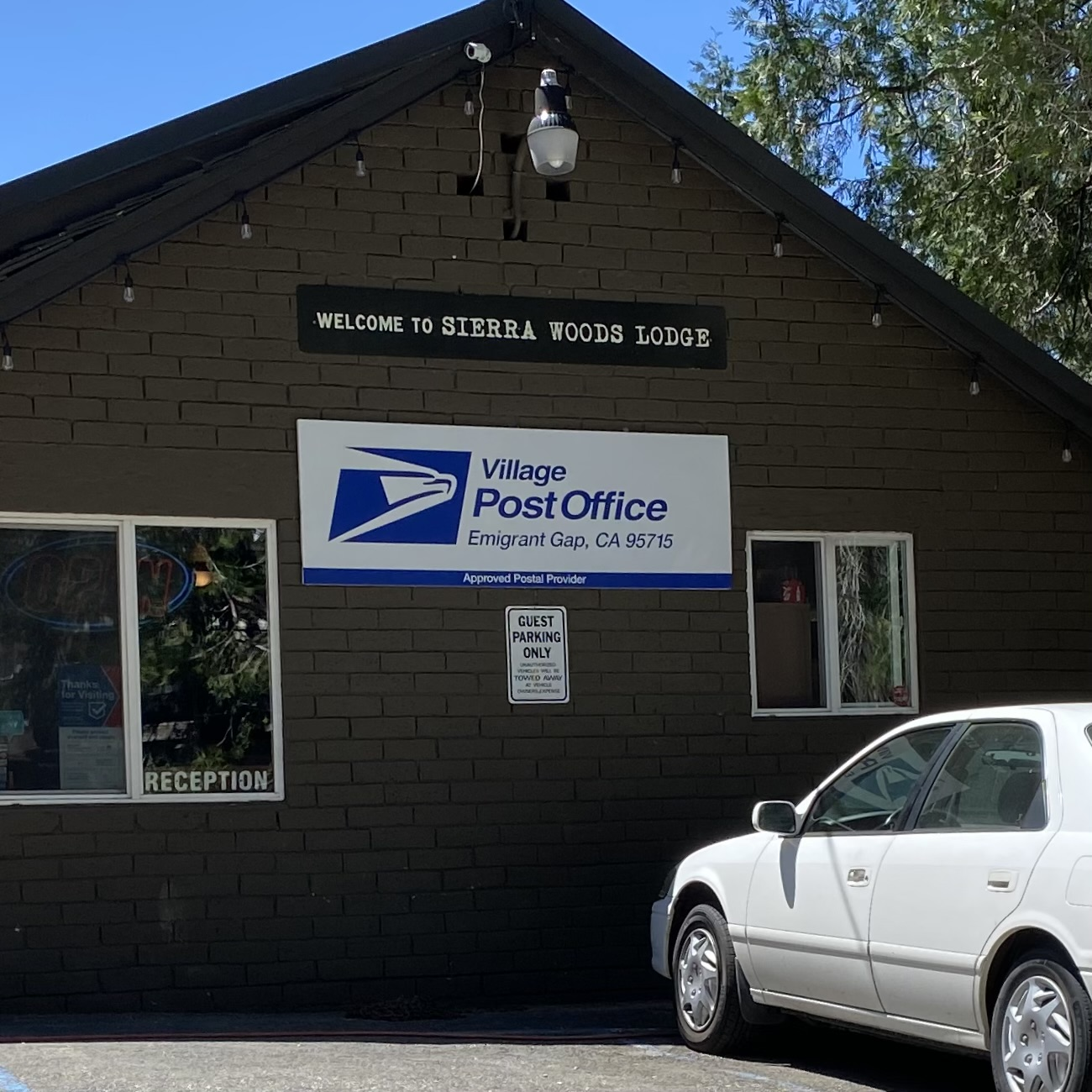
- Emigrant Gap, California post office

- Location in California
- Coordinates: 39°17′49″N 120°40′22″W
- Country: United States
- State: California
- County: Placer County
- Elevation: 5,190 ft (1,582 m)

Population (2016)
  - Total: 80
- ZIP codes: 95715
- Area codes: 530, 837

Emigrant Gap (formerly, Wilsons Ranch) is an unincorporated community in Placer County, California. The Emigrant Gap community is located 0.25 miles (0.4 km) southwest of the Emigrant Gap landmark. It lies at an elevation of 5190 feet (1582 m).

The Wilsons Ranch post office opened in 1865, changed its name to Emigrant Gap in 1868. The name Wilsons Ranch honored a stage stop operator.

== Climate ==
Emigrant Gap has a warm-summer Mediterranean climate (Csb) according to the Köppen climate classification system. Summers are warm and occasionally hot with cool nights, while winters are cold and snowy. The Western Regional Climate Center had a weather station at an elevation of 5014 feet right next to Emigrant Gap at Lake Spaulding.

Climate data for Emigrant Gap, California (Lake Spaulding), 1981-2010 temperature and precipitation normals, snowfall and extremes 1902–2003
| Month | Jan | Feb | Mar | Apr | May | Jun | Jul | Aug | Sep | Oct | Nov | Dec | Year |
|---|---|---|---|---|---|---|---|---|---|---|---|---|---|
| Record high °F (°C) | 72 (22) | 75 (24) | 87 (31) | 96 (36) | 97 (36) | 100 (38) | 104 (40) | 103 (39) | 106 (41) | 95 (35) | 86 (30) | 72 (22) | 106 (41) |
| Mean maximum °F (°C) | 55 (13) | 57 (14) | 69 (21) | 83 (28) | 88 (31) | 92 (33) | 95 (35) | 93 (34) | 90 (32) | 81 (27) | 70 (21) | 58 (14) | 95 (35) |
| Mean daily maximum °F (°C) | 44.1 (6.7) | 44.6 (7.0) | 46.5 (8.1) | 53.2 (11.8) | 61.3 (16.3) | 72.7 (22.6) | 81.6 (27.6) | 81.5 (27.5) | 75.4 (24.1) | 63.9 (17.7) | 49.2 (9.6) | 44.0 (6.7) | 59.8 (15.5) |
| Daily mean °F (°C) | 35.0 (1.7) | 36.7 (2.6) | 38.9 (3.8) | 43.7 (6.5) | 51.2 (10.7) | 58.8 (14.9) | 65.0 (18.3) | 63.9 (17.7) | 59.7 (15.4) | 51.6 (10.9) | 42.2 (5.7) | 37.8 (3.2) | 48.7 (9.3) |
| Mean daily minimum °F (°C) | 27.3 (−2.6) | 27.1 (−2.7) | 29.2 (−1.6) | 35.3 (1.8) | 42.1 (5.6) | 49.3 (9.6) | 57.3 (14.1) | 56.9 (13.8) | 49.2 (9.6) | 41.3 (5.2) | 33.1 (0.6) | 26.6 (−3.0) | 39.6 (4.2) |
| Mean minimum °F (°C) | 12 (−11) | 13 (−11) | 14 (−10) | 25 (−4) | 31 (−1) | 32 (0) | 48 (9) | 47 (8) | 38 (3) | 29 (−2) | 20 (−7) | 11 (−12) | 9 (−13) |
| Record low °F (°C) | −3 (−19) | −2 (−19) | 0 (−18) | 12 (−11) | 16 (−9) | 24 (−4) | 33 (1) | 32 (0) | 24 (−4) | 14 (−10) | 10 (−12) | −4 (−20) | −4 (−20) |
| Average precipitation inches (mm) | 12.26 (311) | 12.64 (321) | 11.10 (282) | 6.21 (158) | 4.10 (104) | 1.29 (33) | 0.17 (4.3) | 0.25 (6.4) | 1.43 (36) | 4.17 (106) | 9.32 (237) | 14.01 (356) | 76.95 (1,954.7) |
| Average snowfall inches (cm) | 53.8 (137) | 49.0 (124) | 49.1 (125) | 23.5 (60) | 6.4 (16) | 0.5 (1.3) | 0.0 (0.0) | 0.0 (0.0) | 0.1 (0.25) | 2.5 (6.4) | 17.9 (45) | 40.5 (103) | 243.3 (617.95) |
| Average precipitation days (≥ 0.01 in) | 12 | 11.5 | 12 | 10 | 7 | 4 | 1 | 1 | 3.5 | 5.3 | 10.4 | 12 | 89.7 |
| Average snowy days | 7.8 | 7.8 | 7.5 | 4.6 | 1.2 | 0 | 0 | 0 | 0 | 0.4 | 4.4 | 7 | 40.7 |
Source: WRCC (temperature and precipitation averages 1981–2010, other values 1902-2003)
