= Berryessa Snow Mountain National Monument =

Land preserve in the Coastal Ranges of California

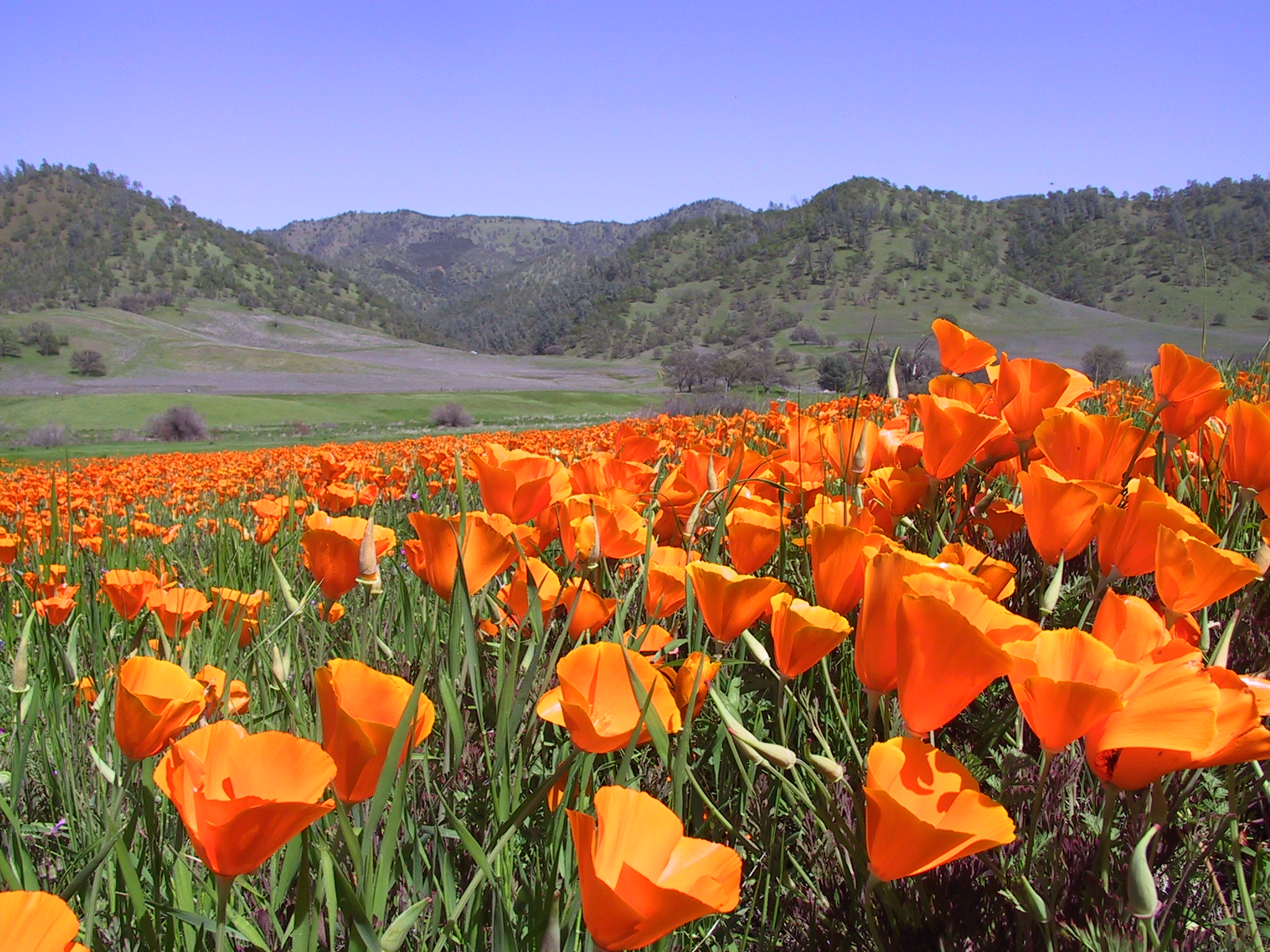
- Berryessa Snow Mountain National Monument

- Location within California Location within the United States
- Interactive map of Berryessa Snow Mountain National Monument
- Location: Northern Inner Coast Ranges, California, U.S.
- Nearest city: Clearlake, California
- Coordinates: 39°13′0″N 122°46′0″W
- Area: 344,476 acres (139,404 ha)
- Established: July 10, 2015
- Governing body: U.S. Forest Service, U.S. Bureau of Land Management
- Website: Berryessa Snow Mountain National Monument

U.S. National Monument

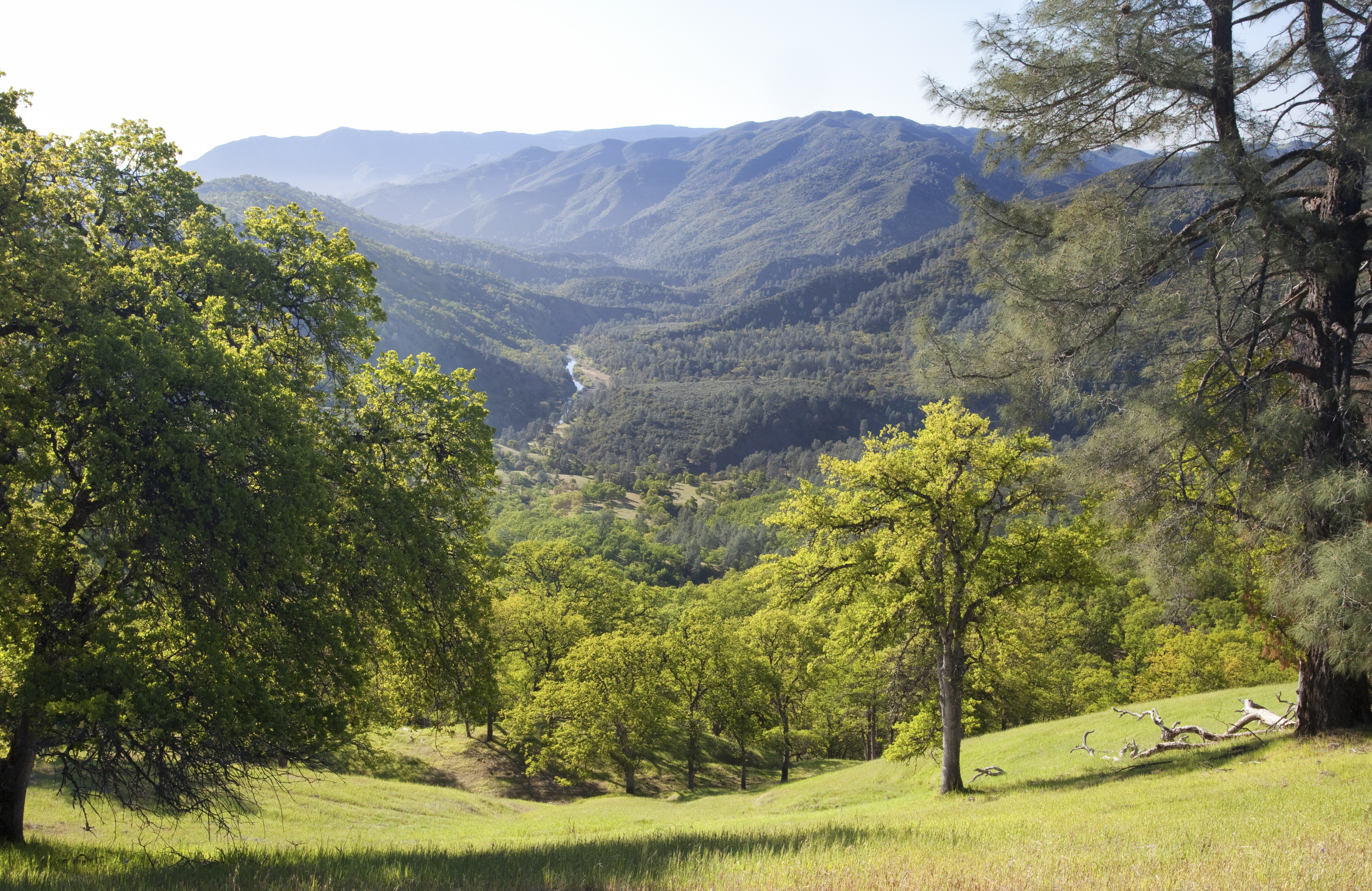
Cache Creek Wilderness is within the new National Monument

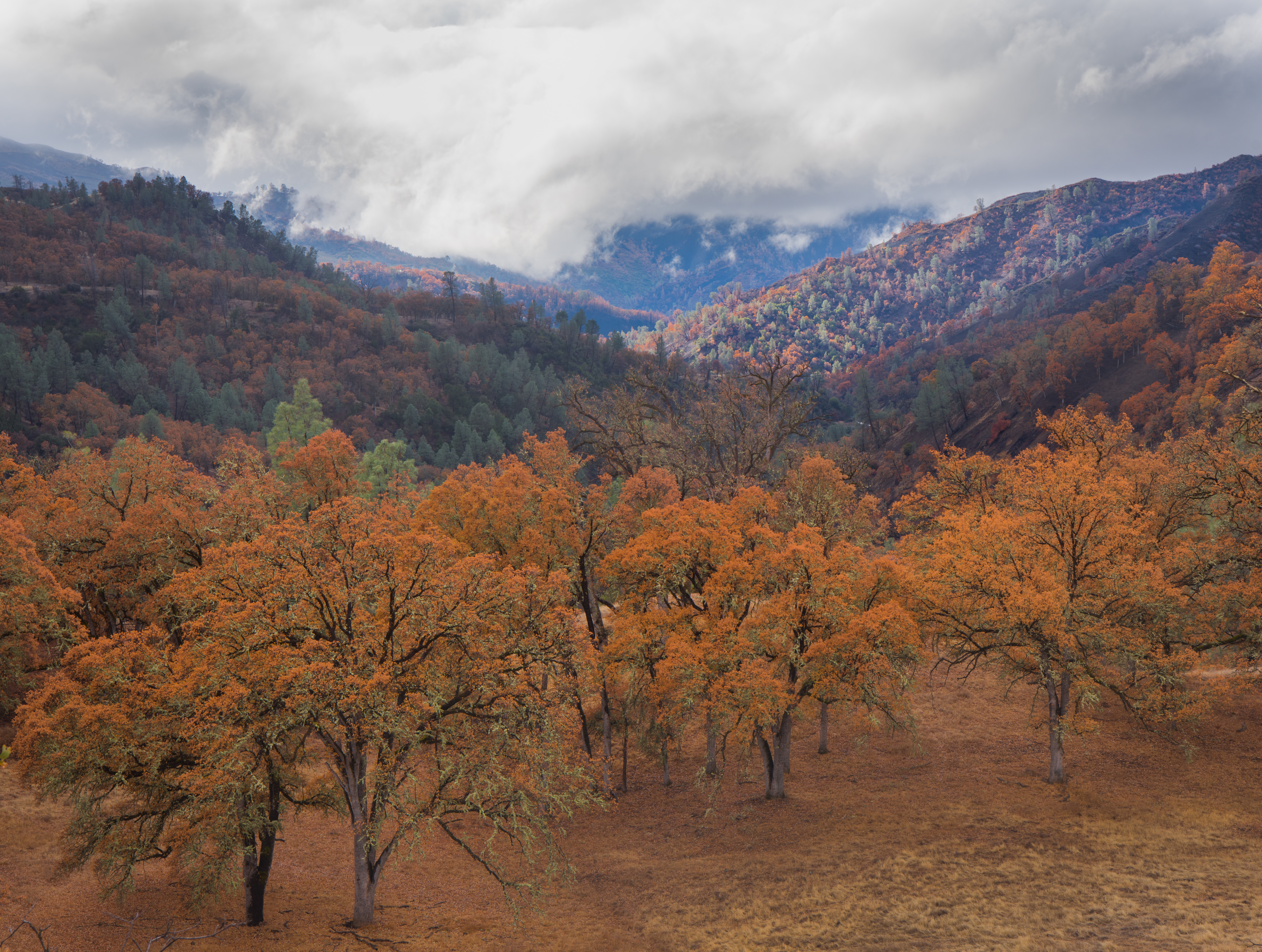
High Bridge Trail in Autumn

Berryessa Snow Mountain National Monument is a national monument of the United States comprising 344,476 acres (139,404 ha) of the California Coast Ranges in Napa, Yolo, Solano, Lake, Colusa, Glenn and Mendocino counties in northern California. Cache Creek Wilderness is located within the monument.

== Creation ==
The national monument was created by a proclamation issued on July 10, 2015, by President Barack Obama under the Antiquities Act. Obama also signed proclamations creating two other national monuments (the Basin and Range National Monument in Nevada and the Waco Mammoth National Monument in central Texas) the same day. The monument, originally 330,780 acres, is jointly managed by the Mendocino National Forest of the U.S. Forest Service and the Bureau of Land Management.

The proclamation of Berryessa Snow Mountain National Monument came after a campaign for the area's designation, supported by a coalition of counties and cities in the region (many of which passed resolutions of support), the California State Legislature, the Elem Indian Colony of Pomo Indians, state and local political leaders, local newspaper editorial boards, conservationist and environmental organizations, recreation groups, local business owners and landowners.

On May 2, 2024, President Joe Biden expanded the monument by 13,696 acres to include an 11-mile ridgeline called Molok Luyuk.

== Description ==
The monument extends approximately 100 miles (160 km) from Mendocino County to mountains on either side of Lake Berryessa in Yolo and Napa counties. The monument includes the Snow Mountain, Cache Creek and the Cedar Roughs Wilderness areas. The monument, along with the lake, take their name from the Berryessa family of California, a historically prominent Californio family of the Bay Area.

Lake Berryessa itself was not included within the monument's boundaries due to critics' concerns over the possibility that the use of motorized boats, watercraft and jet skis could be restricted at some point in the future.

=== Ecology ===
Wildlife in the region includes bald eagles, golden eagles, black bears, mountain lions, tule elk, black-tailed deer, northern spotted owl, marten, fisher, California Coastal chinook salmon, and Northern California steelhead. The area is also home to some of the world's rare plants, described as "particularly delicate serpentine plants clinging to otherwise barren and rocky mountainsides." The high-elevation Snow Mountain area is one of the most biologically diverse regions in California.

=== Native American history ===
The area has cultural and historical, as well as ecological, significance. The region has been inhabited by linguistically diverse Native American tribes for 11,000 years — including the Yuki, Nomlaki, Patwin, Pomo, Huchnom, Wappo, Lake Miwok and Wintun indigenous peoples.

== See also ==
- Blue Ridge Berryessa Natural Area
- List of national monuments of the United States
- Natural history of the California Coast Ranges
