= Crabtree Hot Springs, California =

Crabtree Hot Springs
- Private Property, closed to the public
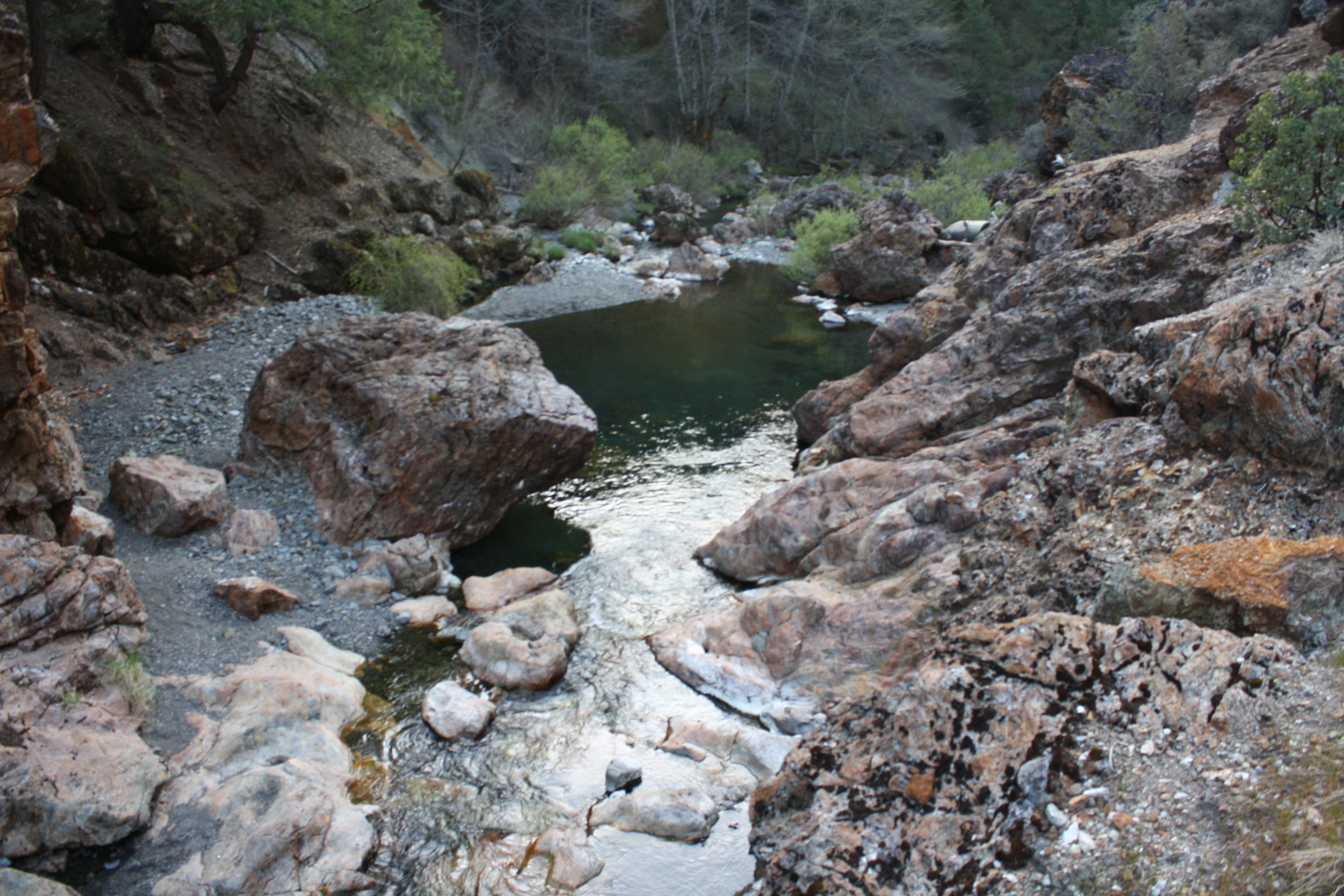
- Crabtree Hot Springs

- Location in California
- Coordinates: 39°17′23.59″N 122°49′19.98″W
- Country: United States
- State: California
- County: Lake County
- Crabtree Hot Springs: 1875
- Elevation: 2,257 ft (688 m)

Crabtree Hot Springs is a geological phenomenon in Lake County, California, about 25 miles (40 km) north of Upper Lake. It is located on private property and closed to the public. It lies at an elevation of 2,257 feet (688 m). There is a cluster of four natural hot springs at this location, in an isolated narrow winding steep walled canyon on the north bank of the Rice Fork of the Eel River, about one fourth mile downriver from its junction with Salt Creek. Three of the hot springs are aligned in one area at a large swimming hole, while the fourth hot spring is about 60 feet (18 m) back upriver. The temperature of the hottest spring is 106 °F (41 °C), with a flow rate of about 10 US gallons (38 L) per minute.

== History ==
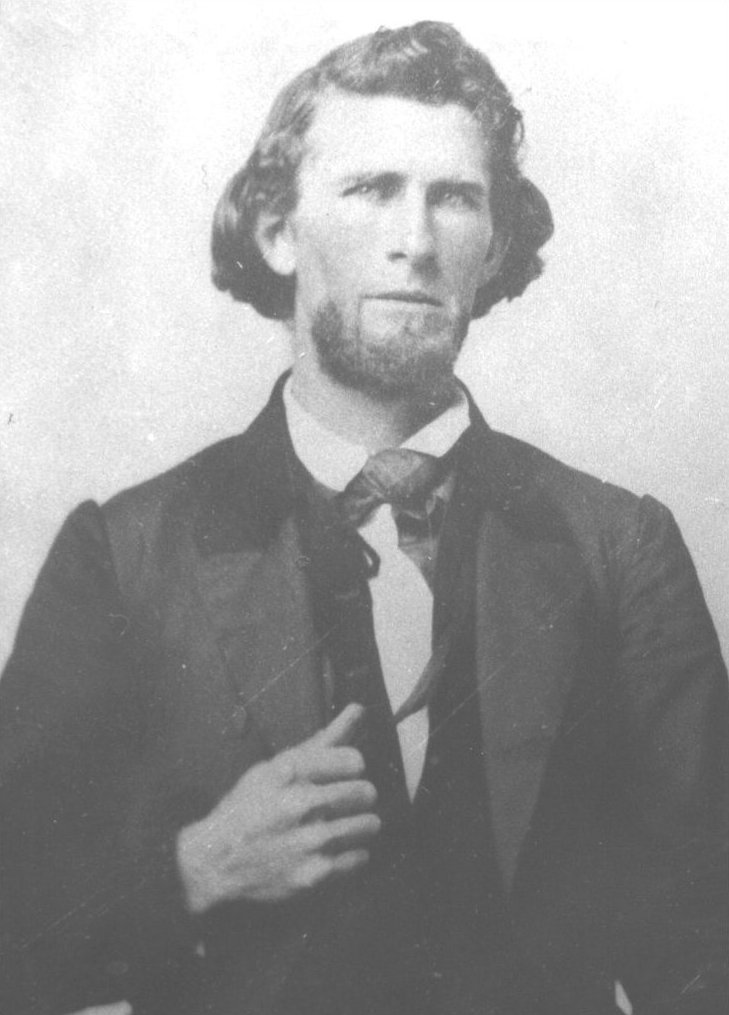
c. 1855 John Fletcher Crabtree

About 1875, John Fletcher Crabtree (1824-1915), and sons found the hot springs by following a well used Native American trail. The local Native Americans believed that the water had health-giving qualities, and Crabtree invited whites to the springs for these purported medicinal properties, many of whom had absolute faith in the springs as a cure-all. Some people even took sick horses there and swore by the results. No water was commercially bottled here, but the springs was commercialized as a resort.

About 1907, Samuel Tate Packwood (1842-1924), an Upper Lake businessman, bought property at Crabtree Hot Springs, and made plans to set up a resort there. Crabtree lived at the springs for many years.

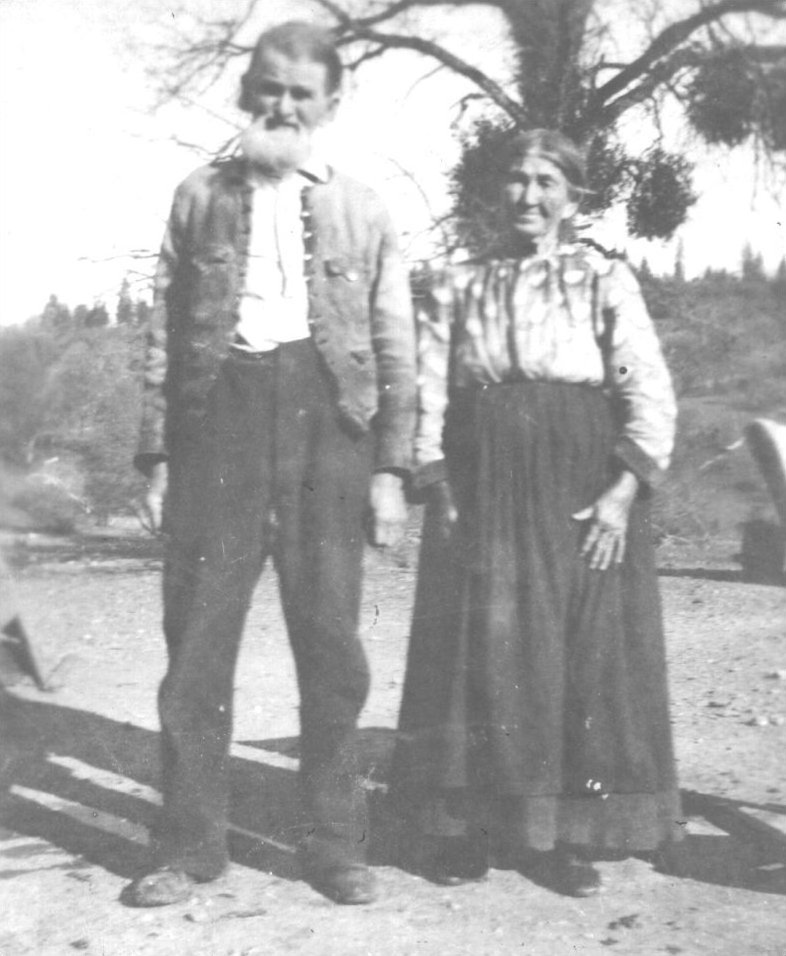
c. 1890 John and Elizabeth Crabtree

== Minerals ==
About 1900, in search of quicksilver, two tunnels were driven into the canyon side a short distance downriver from the springs, and although the rock contains noticeable amounts of cinnabar, this mineral was not found in paying quantity.

The serpentine rock at the head of the Eel River is crushed to a green clay or shining black shales. At Crabtree Hot Springs, the serpentine is exposed in the bed of the creek, with argillaceous shale on both sides. The springs come up at the contact as well as in the serpentine.

The principal spring emerges at the northeast edge of the stream in a natural rock basin at the foot of a small cliff, and yields perhaps 10 US gallons (38 L) a minute of water at 106 °F (41 °C) in temperature. Considerable gas, probably carbon dioxide issues with the water which is mildly carbonated and is distinctly mineralized by salts of soda, sulfur, and probably also of iron. The pool formed by this spring has long been used for bathing and the water is locally considered efficacious in the treatment of skin and blood diseases.

== Twin Valley Road and Native American trails ==
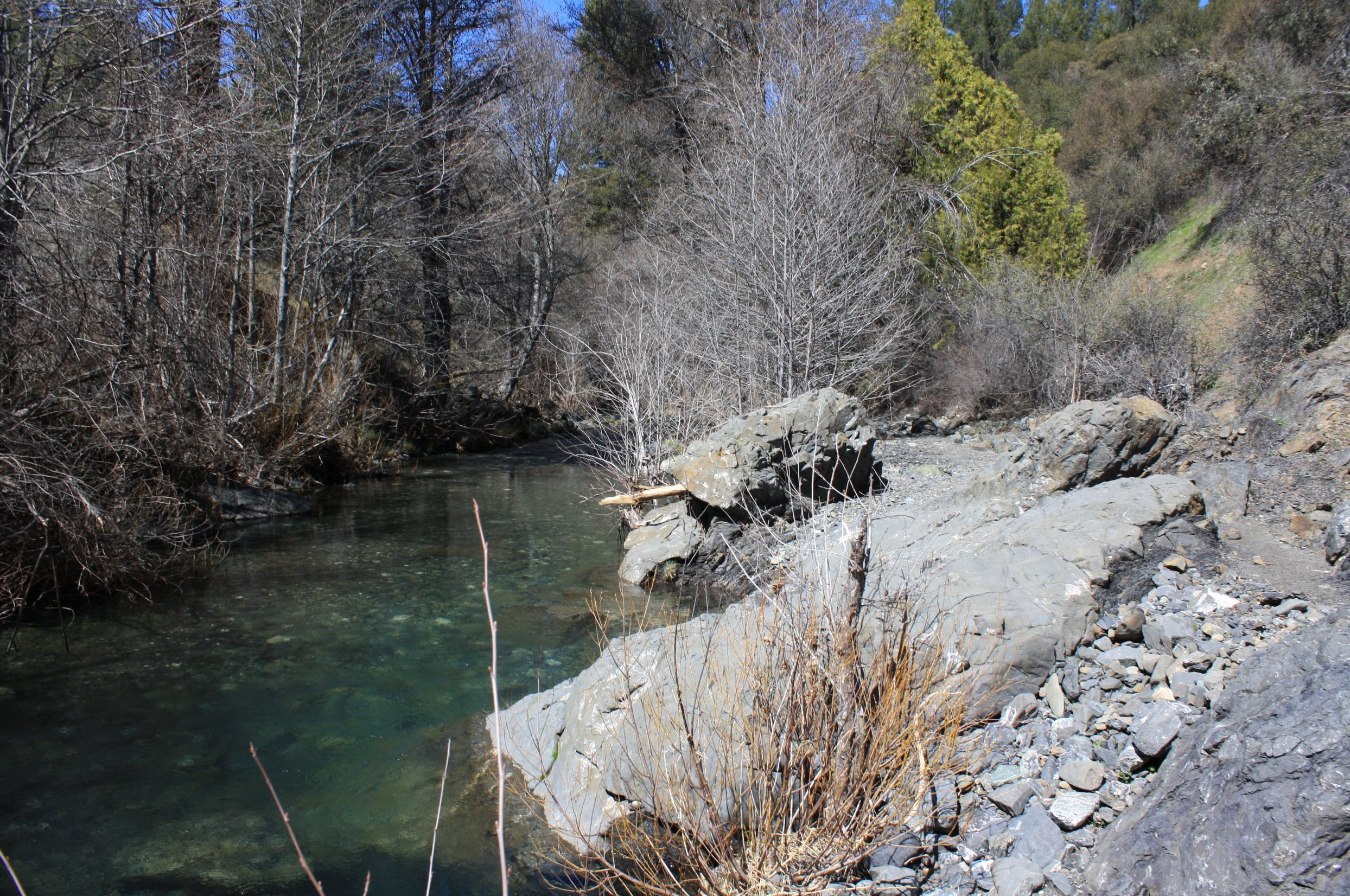
Rice Fork Eel River at Crabtree Hot Springs trailhead

At one time, there was a historic Native American trail from the springs to Twin Valleys and on to Bartlett Springs. The Crabtree family built the first wagon road from Twin Valleys to Crabtree Hot Springs, and helped build the present road from Twin Valleys to Bartlett Springs. The Crabtree family all moved from the Crabtree Hot Springs area before 1900, and the road to this location was abandoned and soon became impassable. Packwood reopened the wagon road which at that time only went as far as the springs.

Twin Valley Road was constructed by the Civilian Conservation Corps in 1933-1934 as a public work relief program for young unemployed men during the depression. Often referred to as the (Off-Highway Vehicle) OHV Corridor, Twin Valley Road (forest road 17N04) is a designated 40-mile (64 km) east-west major transportation route across the south end of Mendocino National Forest connecting the Upper Lake and Grindstone Ranger Districts.

From Twin Valley Road (at the junction of Rice Fork and Salt Creek), there is a one fourth mile trail to the hot springs. The trail follows the river, staying on the north side.

At another time, a Native American trail went from the hot springs down the Rice Fork canyon to the mouth of the river where it entered Gravelly Valley, then crossed the river at the upper end of the valley, then went up Squaw Valley Creek to the north of Big Squaw Valley and over the ridge to the Native American village at Bloody Rock. A portion of this trail is now under Lake Pillsbury.

There was also a well used Native American trail from Upper Lake to the hot springs, as it was a spa for them. The large boulder at the springs is called, Medicine Rock.

== Deaths ==
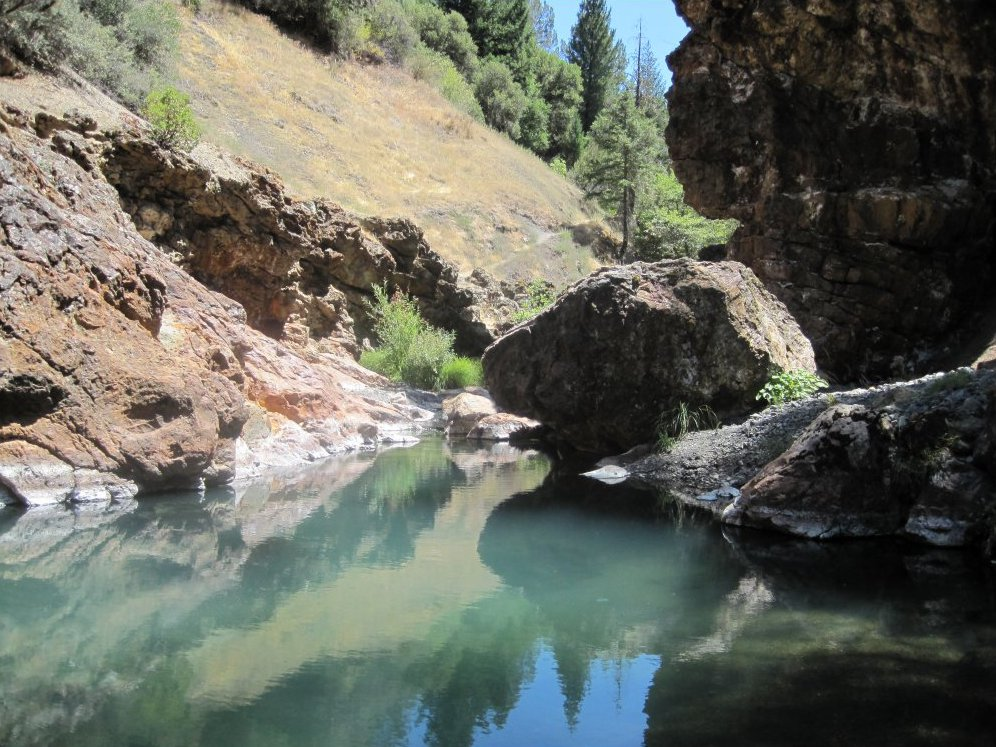
Crabtree Hot Springs

MITCHELL, Todd (before 1900)
When it was legal to kill and sell deer meat, there were two commercial deer hunters camped near the hot springs who peddled the meat in the Clear Lake area. One time, Mr. Crabtree went to civilization to get supplies and on his return found one of the hunters dead as he had accidentally killed himself. He is buried and his grave is near the springs.

Small animals, birds and lizards are often killed on coming down to the river to drink. There is an immense amount of carbonic acid gas bubbling up through the water of the river and that which flows out of the hillside at these hot springs. Sulfuric gas fumes are also present.

== J.F. Crabtree ==
John Fletcher Crabtree (1824-1915) was born in Virginia on April 13, 1824. When a young man, John moved to Missouri where he met, and then married Elizabeth Davis on November 28, 1844. The couple traveled west to California in 1852, and first homesteaded in Contra Costa County, before finally settling in Lake County around 1866, first at Seigler Canyon. About 1890, John Fletcher Crabtree, his wife Elizabeth, and their sons Alphonzo and William, moved to Twin Valleys which included the Crabtree Hot Springs, which son, Orin Crabtree, had found 10 or 15 years earlier. John built his home about 150 yards southwest from the junction of Rice Fork and Salt Creek, on a bench on land. John and Elizabeth had 12 children (four daughters and eight sons). John F. & Elizabeth Crabtree moved to Upper Lake sometime between 1902 and 1904. He died on April 3, 1915, and is buried in the Upper Lake Cemetery.

His son, Orin Crabtree, lived there until 1920, when he sold to the Dixon Gun Club. Two of Orin Crabtree's sons (Irvin & Henry) stayed until 1923 to take care of the Dixon Gun club's Horses.

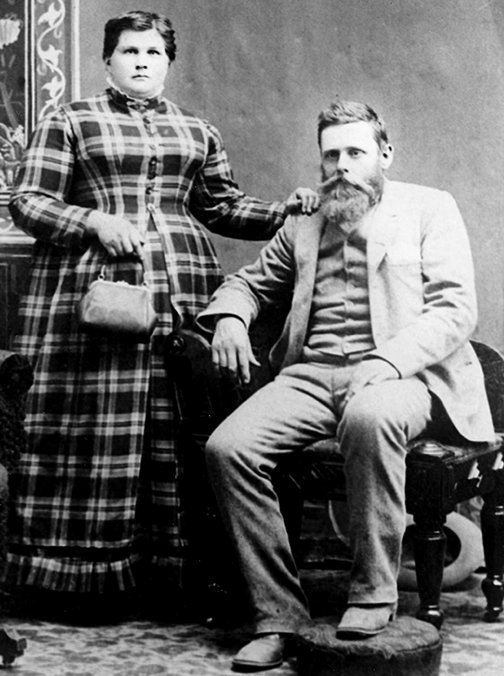
Sheriff Samuel T. Packwood and his wife Margaret c. 1885

== S.T. Packwood ==
Sheriff Samuel T. Packwood (1842-1924) served as Kittitas County's second sheriff from 1884 to 1889. As president of several irrigation canal enterprises, Packwood was a recognized authority, and leader in the promotion and successful completion of large scale irrigation projects. However, Mrs. Packwood suffered from asthma, and with hopes of benefiting her health, the Packwood's moved to Upper Lake in 1905. With gratifying results, her affliction practically disappeared with the change of climate.

In Lake County, Packwood owned a large farm near Upper Lake, served on the board of directors of the Farmer's Merchant Bank in Lakeport, and planned to build a resort at Crabtree Hot Springs. About 1907, he concreted the middle hot springs, at the swimming hole, into a small bathtub with drain. Sometime later, the Packwood's moved back to Kittitas County, Washington.

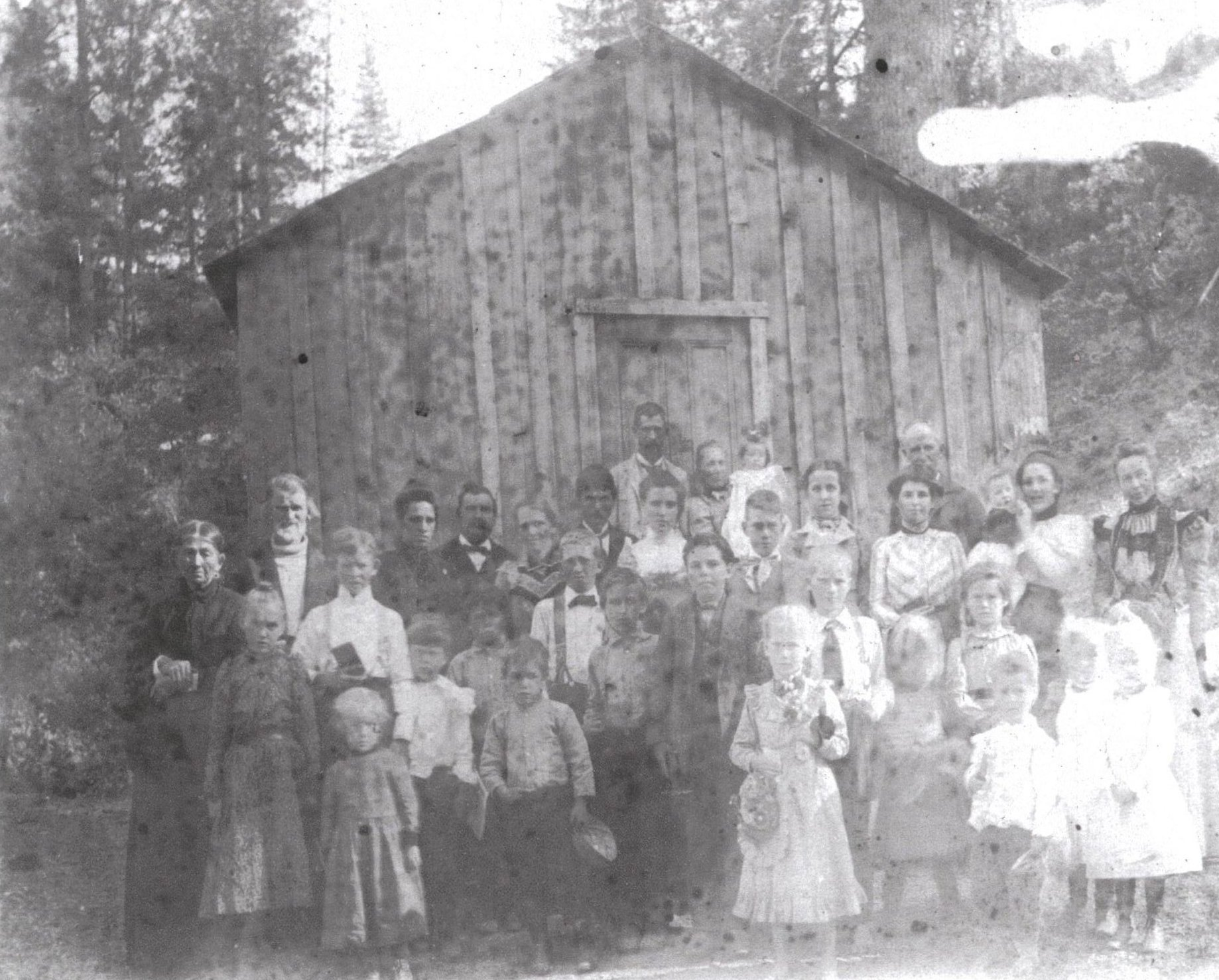
John and Elizabeth Crabtree at the First Twin Valley School c. 1906

== Nearby ==
Hale Ridge Research Natural Area (RNA), Mendocino National Forest. Established by the Forest Service in 1987 to represent the knobcone pine forest for the North Coast Ranges, the RNA includes an impressive selection of knobcone pine, is a designated critical habitat for the federally protected northern spotted owl, and a winter range for black-tailed deer. Within the RNA, dense stands of knobcone pine and mixed conifer forest, dominated by Douglas fir, also provides a dispersal habitat for a Forest Service listed sensitive species, the northern goshawk. The RNA northwestern boundary is adjacent to the hot springs.

Bear Creek Campground (USFS), Mendocino National Forest. Free and open all year, maximum stay 14 days, 16 picnic tables and grilles, and two toilets, elevation 2,000 feet (610 m). Set beside Bear Creek near its confluence with Blue Slides Creek, on Forest Road M-10 (county road 301-C) about 9 miles (14 km) northeast from its junction with Elk Mountain Road. Located near the southern edge of the Snow Mountain Wilderness, about 6 miles (9.7 km) northwest of the hot springs.

== Nature Photo Gallery ==
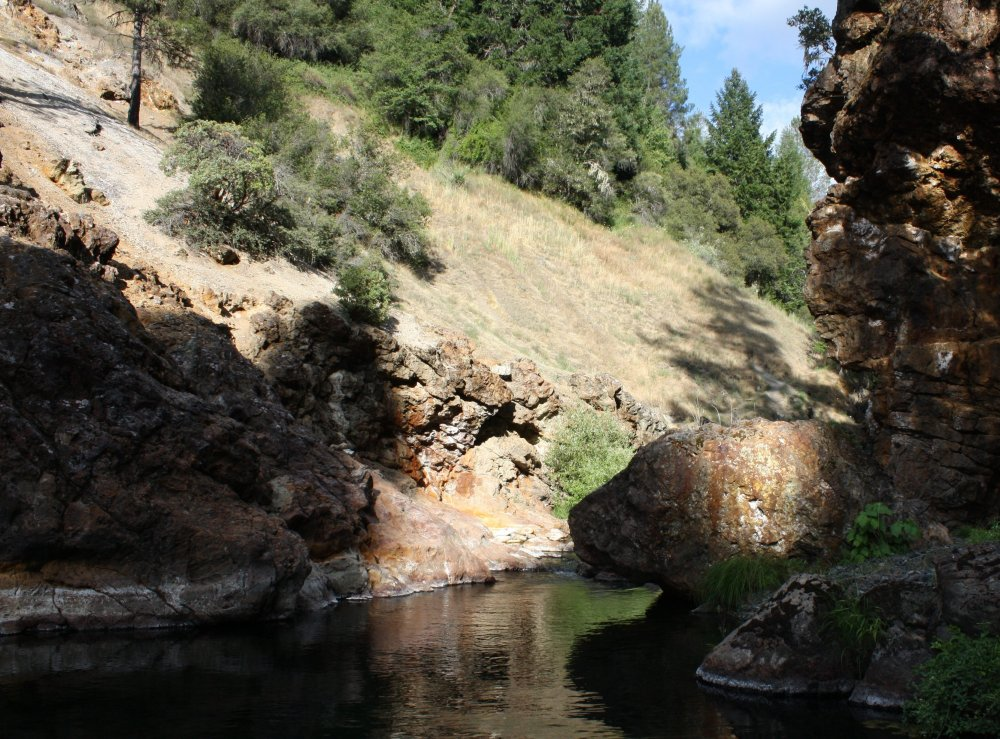
narrow winding steep walled canyon

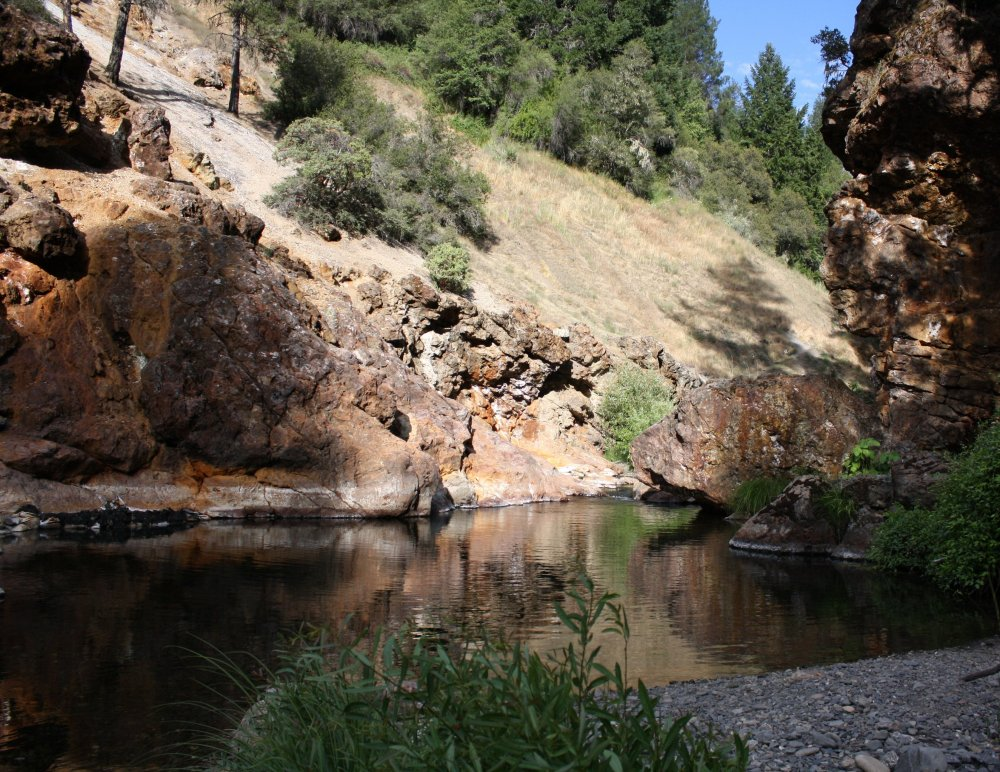
large swimming hole

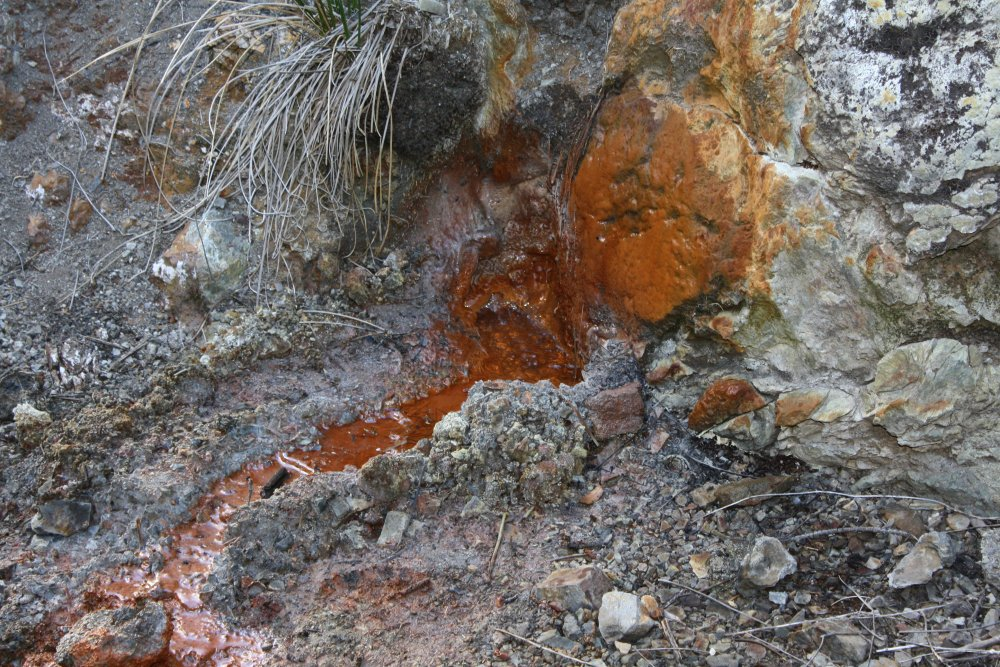
minerals flowing

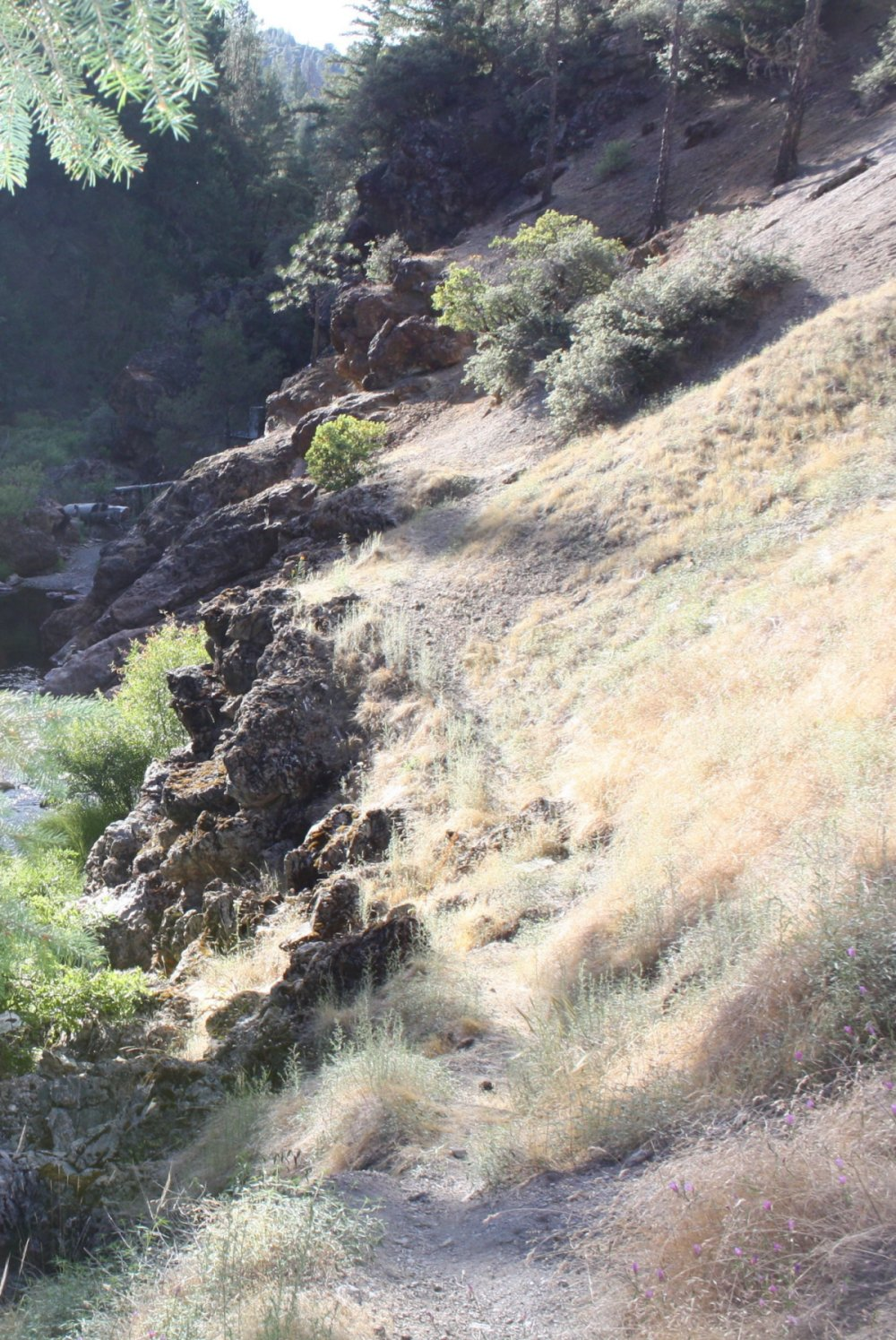
molten rock formations

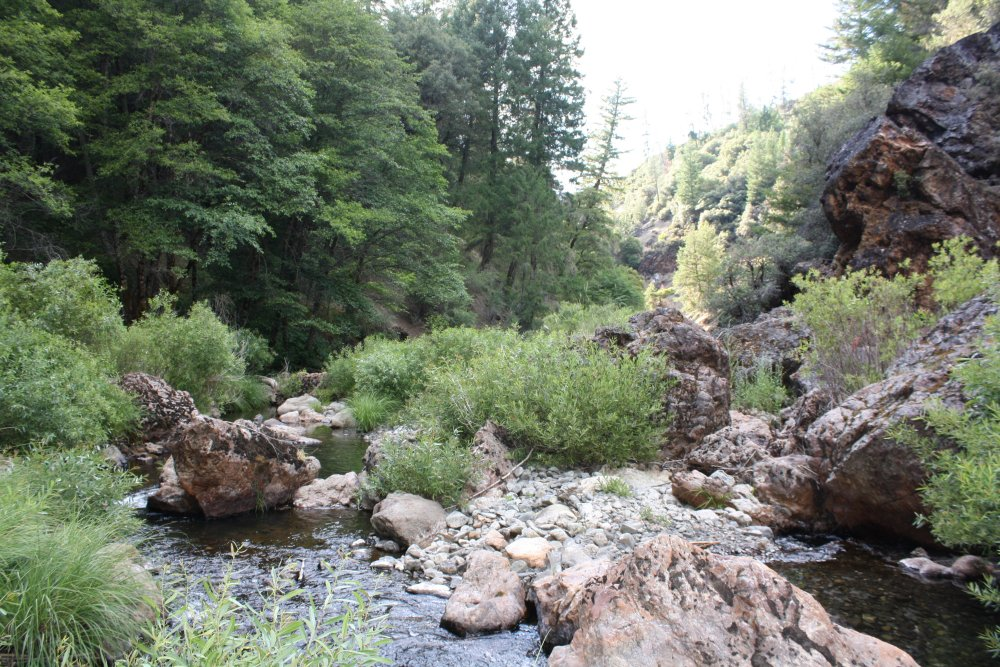
Mendocino National Forest

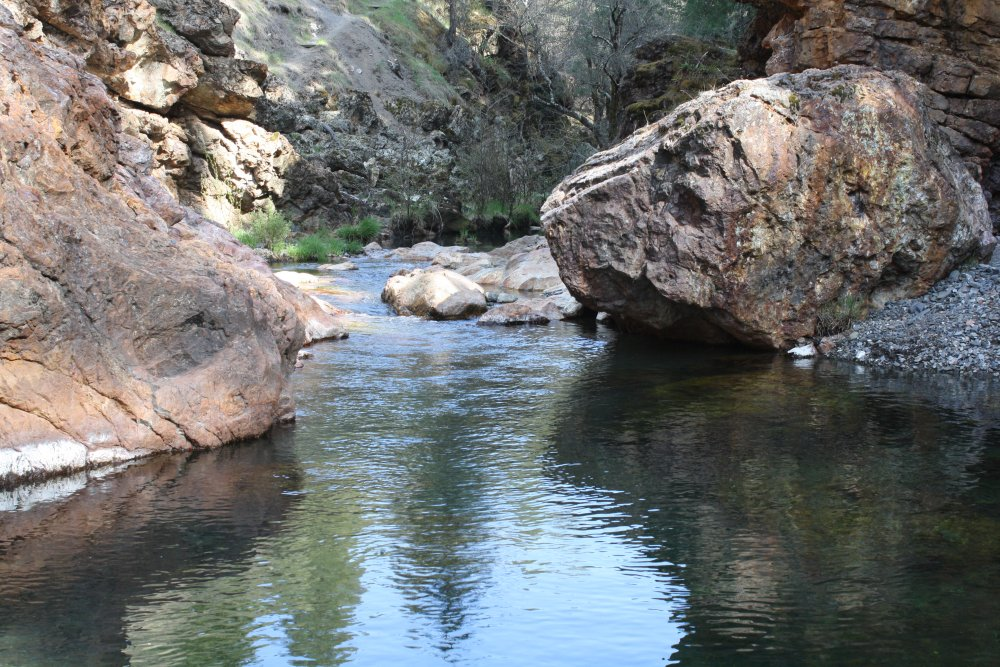
medicine rock

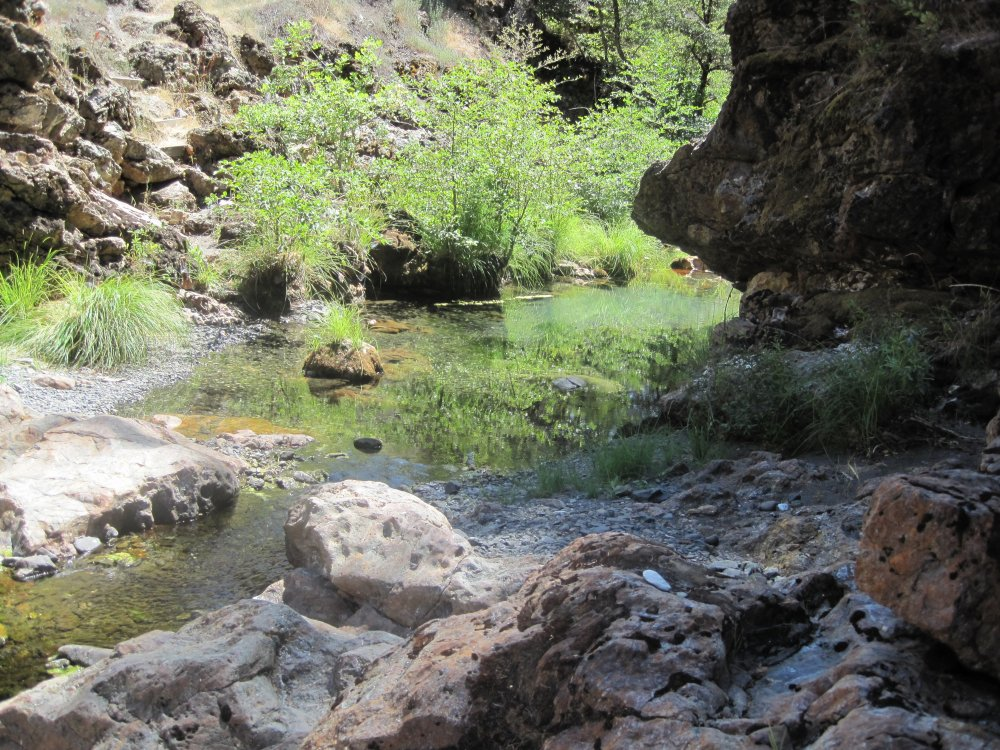
Rice Fork Eel River

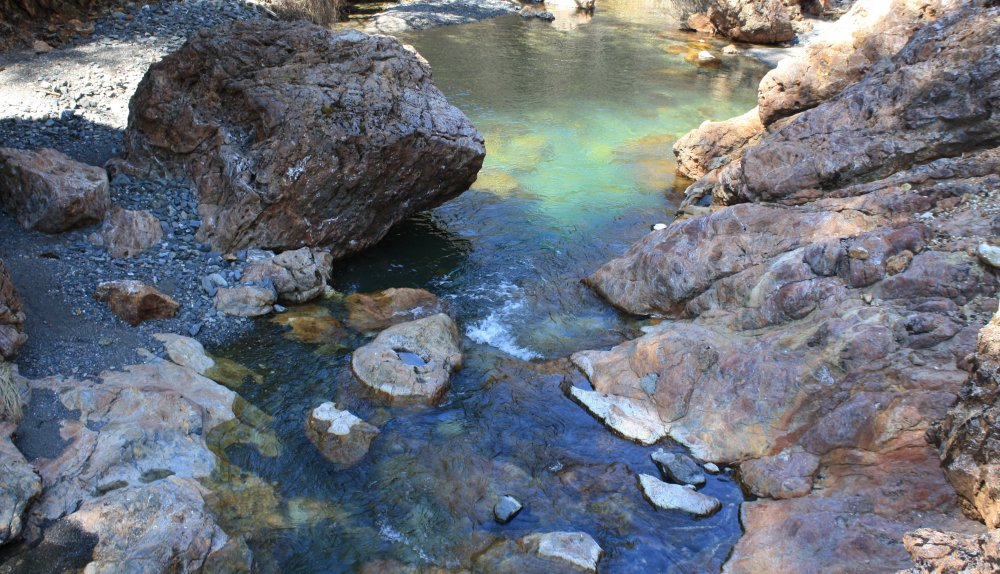
medicine rock

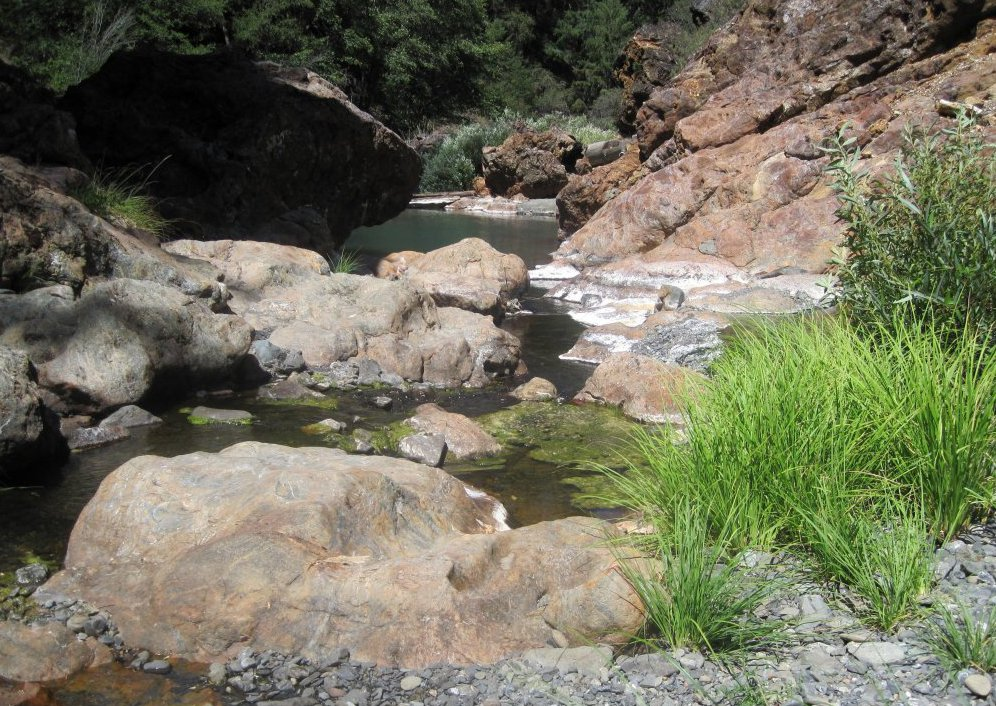
Rice Fork Eel River

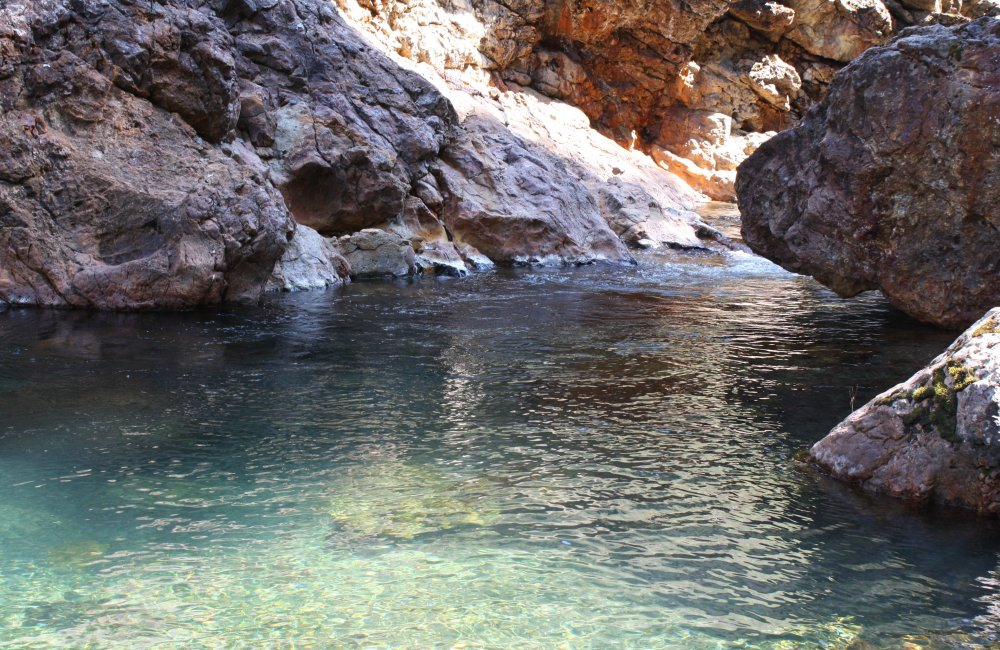
high water

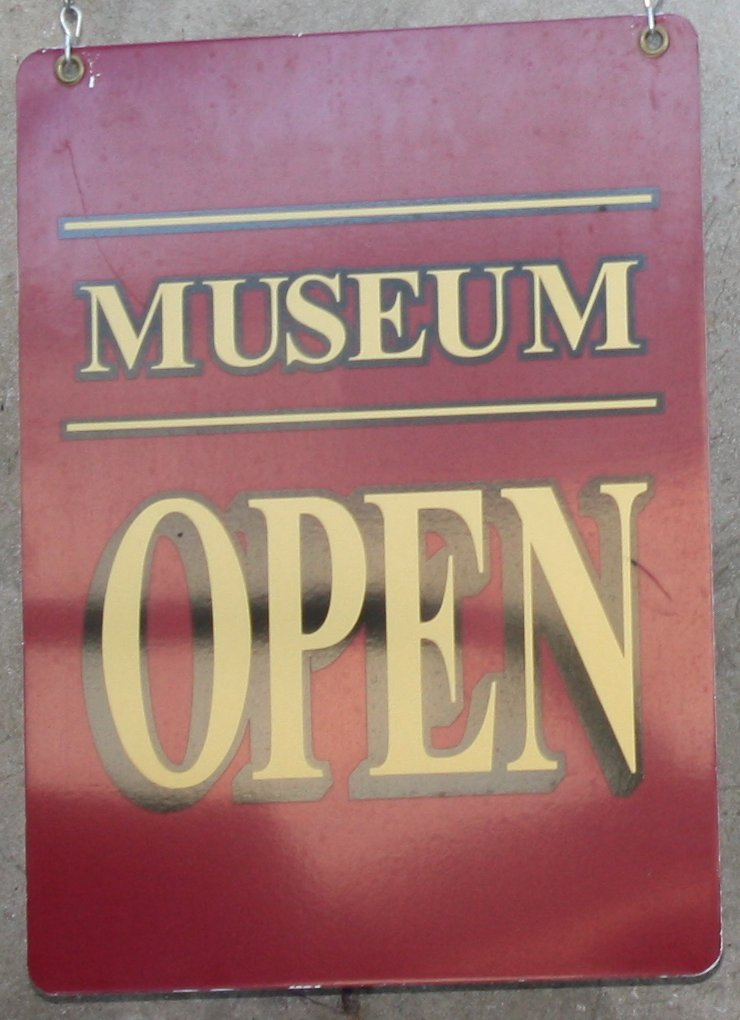
Wed-Sat 10am-4pm & Sunday noon-4pm

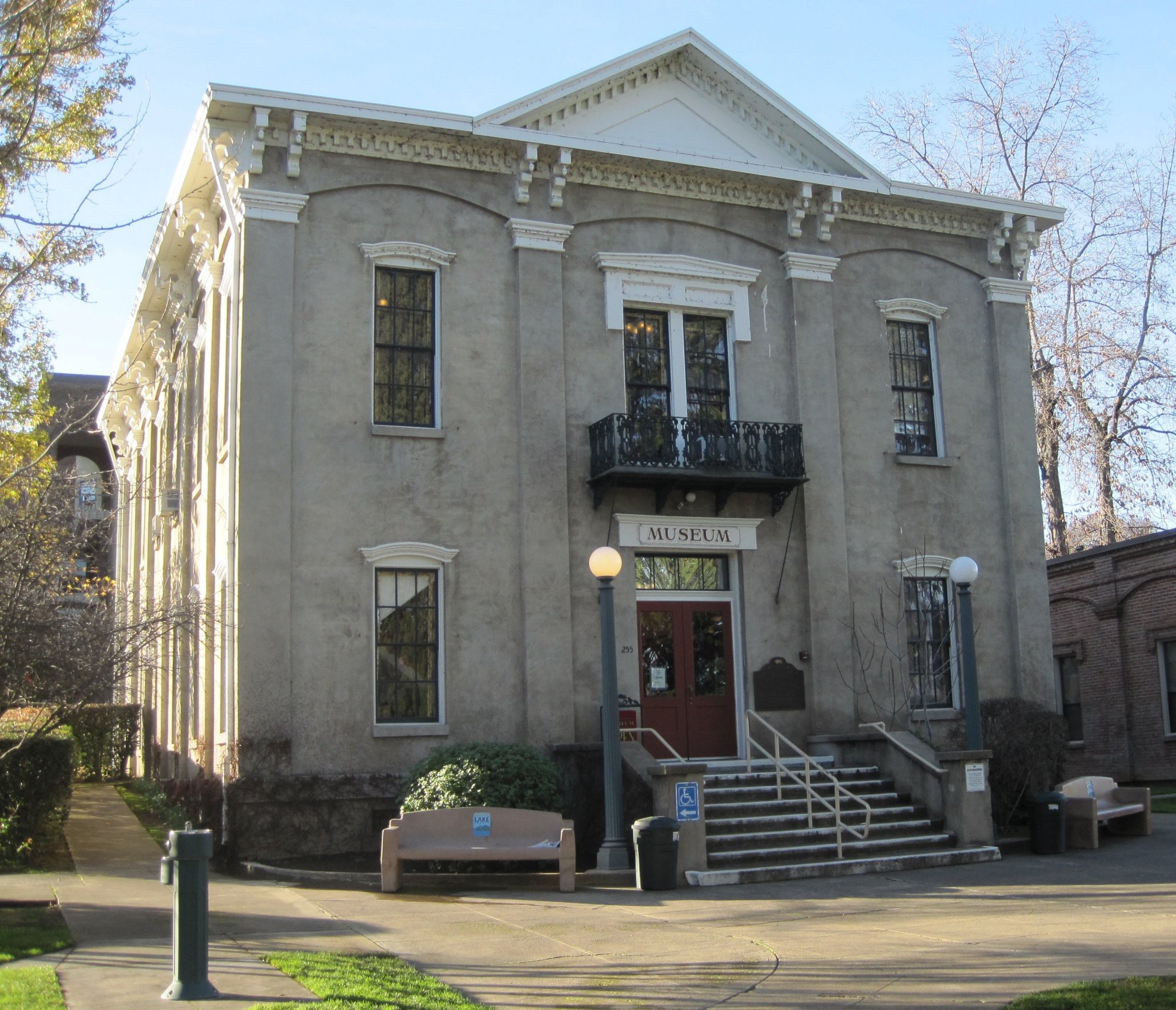
Lakeport Historic Courthouse Museum
