= Stony Creek National Forest =

American National Forest in California

Stony Creek National Forest was established in California on February 6, 1907 with 937,569 acres (3,794 km^{2}) of land. On July 1, 1908, the name was discontinued after a portion of the forest was used to establish the California National Forest, and the remainder was transferred to Trinity National Forest.
