= Cache Creek Wilderness =

Land preserve in Lake County, California

- IUCN category Ib (wilderness area)
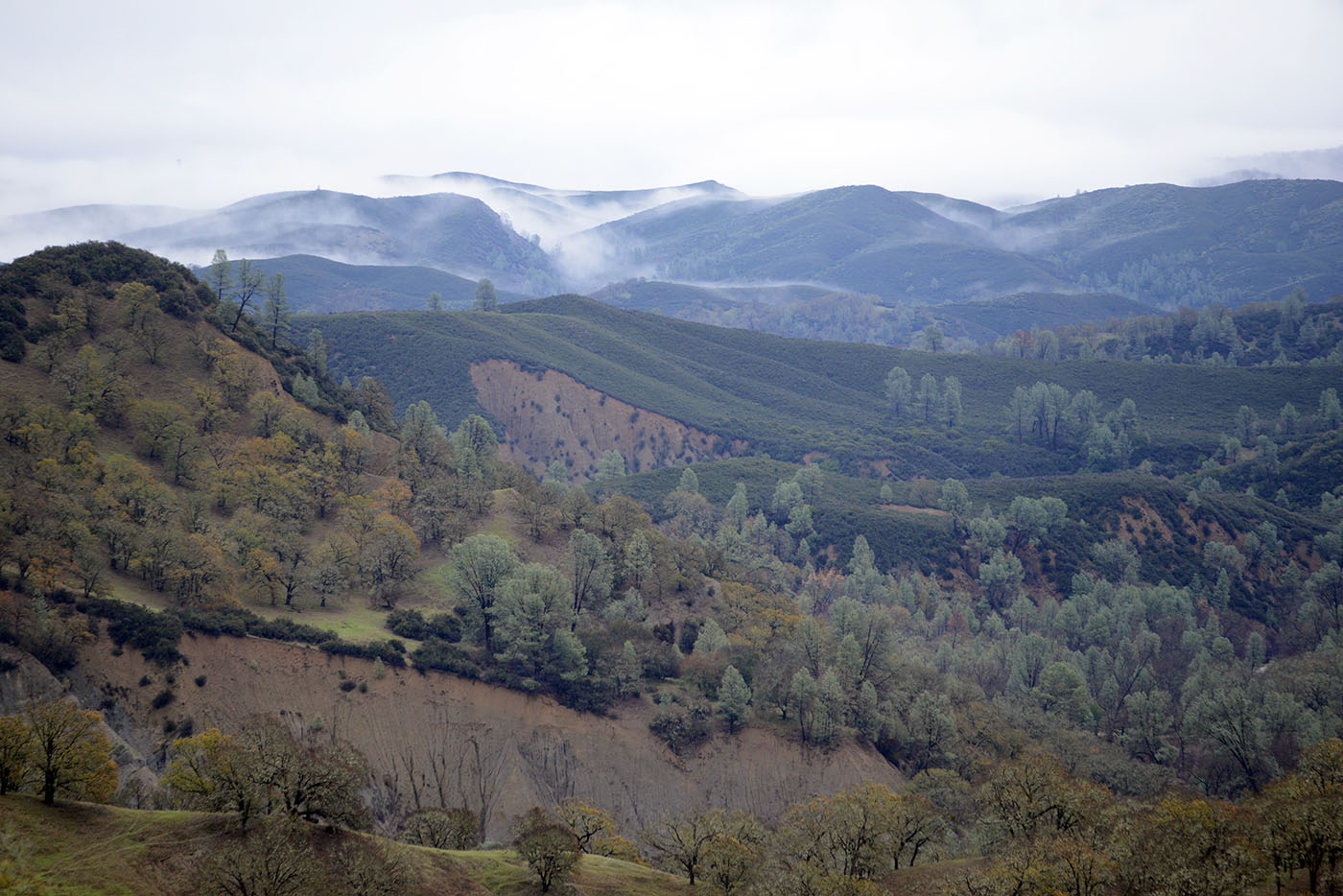
- Interactive map of Cache Creek Wilderness
- Location: Lake County, California
- Nearest city: Lower Lake, California
- Coordinates: 38°55′06″N 122°30′20″W
- Area: 27,245 acres (110.26 km^{2})
- Established: October 2006
- Governing body: Bureau of Land Management

The Cache Creek Wilderness is a 27,245-acre (11,026 ha) wilderness area located in Lake County, California. The wilderness was added to the National Wilderness Preservation System when the United States Congress passed the Northern California Coastal Wild Heritage Wilderness Act in 2006 (Public Law 109-362). In July 2015, the area became part of Berryessa Snow Mountain National Monument. The Department of the Interior's Bureau of Land Management (BLM) is the agency in charge.

The centerpiece of the wilderness is Cache Creek, a tributary of the Sacramento River (in high rainfall years). Cache Creek is one of two tributaries (Putah Creek is the other) that are the most southerly of the significant east-flowing Coast Range drainages in the Sacramento River hydrologic basin and provides important riparian and fish habitat. More than 30 miles (48 km) of Cache Creek is designated a California Wild and Scenic River.

The wilderness area is within the larger Cache Creek Natural Area of more than 70,000 acres (280 km^{2}), and has a wide variety of plant and animal life, including a year-round population of bald eagles and California's second-largest herd of rare endemic tule elk.

Highest elevation point is Brushy Sky High at 3,176 feet (968 m). A topography of steep, rounded hills, open meadows, cliffs and stream canyons support vegetation of manzanita, interior live oak, scrub oak, deerbrush, toyon, birchleaf mahogany, and gray pine as well as serpentine and chemise chaparral. Streamside vegetation include trees of willow, alder, and grasses such as sedge and bulrush. Rare native plants observed in the Cache Creek area include Hall's harmonia, an aromatic annual wildflower, and the adobe lily which are listed by the California Native Plant Society as category 1B-meaning the plant meets all criteria of section 2062 of the California Endangered Species Act.

There are significant archaeological sites documented, including the remains of a large Hill Patwin village occupied around 11,000 years ago.

The Cache Creek area has been and continues to be a popular recreation site for a variety of activities including white-water rafting (called the "wilderness run"), bird watching, hiking, backpacking, fishing and nature photography.

Adjacent to the wilderness is the 2,330-acre (9.4 km^{2}) Cache Creek Wildlife Area that is managed by the California Department of Fish and Game, Yolo County Parks and Bureau of Land Management. Wildlife species include black-tailed deer, tule elk, wild turkey, quail, rabbit, gray squirrel, dove, pigeon, black bear, raccoon and mountain lion.

== Geology ==
The wilderness is within the upper basin of the Cache Creek drainage area and is composed of sandstone, shale, chert and conglomerate belonging to the Franciscan group, Upper Jurassic age. These sediments are of marine origin with extensive folding and faulting. In some places, dikes of serpentinized rock are intruded into the sediments. This is overlain by unmetamorphized sandstone and shale of Cretaceous age, also of marine origin and also folded and faulted with thick serpentine rock interbedded.

Serpentine rock forms from peridotite that has received intense heat and pressure when down near a subduction zone of Earth's tectonic plates. Geologists believe that the rock then surfaces at these zones because of its lower density than the surrounding rocks. Serpentine soils have high levels of metals such as asbestos, copper, mercury and magnesium, among others, that are toxic to many plants. Some plants have not only adapted but have evolved to grow almost exclusively in serpentine soils. The leather oak (Quercus durata var. durata) is one example. Many of these serpentine-adapted plants are also endemic to the state, as this type of soil is not widespread outside of California. Approximately 20% of the state's rare and endemic plants grow in serpentine soils.
