= Saint John of the Mountain =

Saint John of the Mountain is:

== Geography ==
- Saint John Mountain (California)- a mountain in California, USA
- Saint John of the Mountain (Spain) - a village in the province of Burgos, Spain
- Saint John of the Mountain (Philippines) - a village in Quezon, Philippines

== Culture ==
- Saint John of the Mountain Festival - a festival in Miranda de Ebro, Spain
