= Snow Mountain Wilderness =

Protected wilderness area in California, United States

- IUCN category Ib (wilderness area)
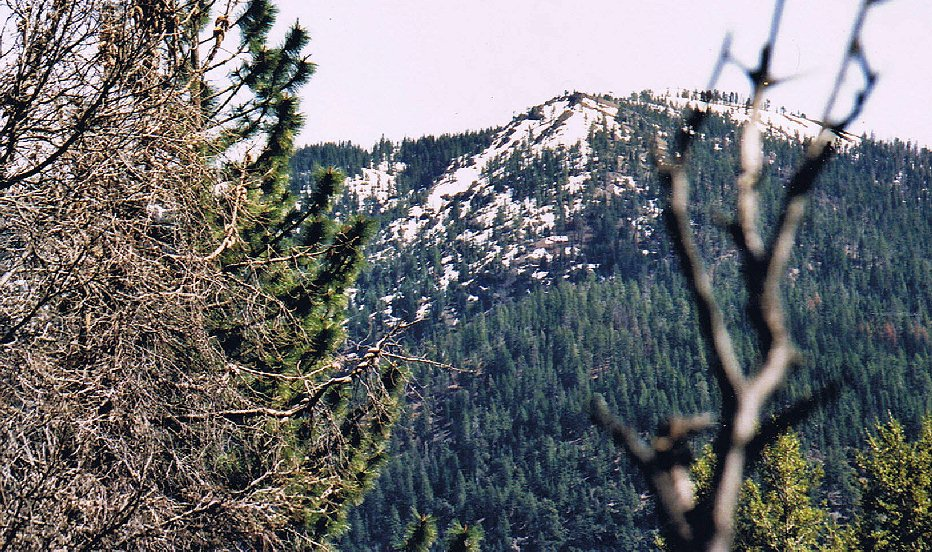
- Snow Mountain, East Peak, April, 2003

- Location within California Location within the United States
- Interactive map of Snow Mountain Wilderness
- Location: Mendocino National Forest; Lake / Colusa / Glenn counties, California, United States
- Nearest city: Lakeport, California
- Coordinates: 39°25′00″N 122°43′19″W
- Area: 37,679 acres (152.48 km^{2})
- Established: 1984
- Governing body: United States Forest Service

The Snow Mountain Wilderness is a 60,076-acre (243.12 km^{2}) federally designated wilderness area located 65 miles (105 km) north of Santa Rosa, California, USA in the Mendocino National Forest. The U.S. Congress passed the California Wilderness Act of 1984 which created 23 new wilderness areas including Snow Mountain. It lies within the North Coast Range of mountains.

Elevations are from 1,800 to 7,056 feet (500 to 2,200 m). The wilderness covers the crest of this North Coast Range mountain divide for 13 miles (21 km) and the summit area includes two peaks, East (7,050 ft) and West (7,021 ft).

On October 17, 2006, the Northern California Coastal Wild Heritage Wilderness Act was signed into law (Public Law No: 109-362) which added 23,706 acres (95.93 km^{2}) to the Snow Mountain Wilderness. In July 2015, the area became part of Berryessa Snow Mountain National Monument.

The Trough Fire burned 24,970 acres (101.1 km^{2}) of Snow Mountain Wilderness and national forest land in August 2001. More than 12 million dollars was spent to contain the wildfire even though most of the area was within the wilderness boundary. This human-caused wildfire started near Fouts Springs, an off-road vehicle recreational area in Mendocino National Forest.

== Streams and waterways ==
The Middle and South Forks of Stony Creek flow down the east side of the divide. The west slopes are drained by the main Eel River and the Rice Fork of the Eel. Other tributaries are Bearwallow Creek and Thistle Glade Creek. Stony Creek has a self-sustaining population of wild rainbow trout.

== Flora and fauna ==
More than 500 species of plants have been identified in the wilderness as well as 122 species of wildlife. The highest elevations have a subalpine environment with barren, rocky slopes and stunted red fir trees, while middle and lower elevations have stands of mixed conifers such as white fir, Jeffrey pine and incense cedar as well as black oak. Mountain mahogany grows on exposed ridges in the wilderness and is a food source for the black-tailed deer. Rare native plants include Sonoma manzanita (Arctostaphylos canescens ssp. sonomensis) on Snow Mountain East, on St John's Mountain is the endemic annual herb bentflower fiddleneck (Amsinckia lunaris).

Other wildlife include black bear, mountain lion, spotted owl and game birds like California quail, sooty grouse and bandtailed pigeon.

== Recreation ==
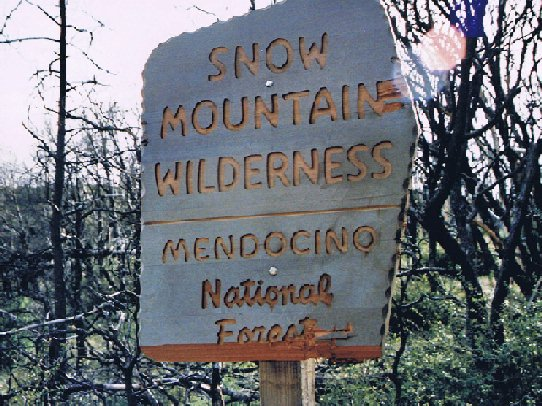
Wilderness boundary sign at Bearwallow Trail (note burn area)

Activities in the wilderness include day hiking, backpacking, skiing, fishing and horseback riding. The Forest Service encourages the practice of Leave No Trace principles of outdoor travel to minimize human impact on the environment.

=== Trails ===
There are 37 miles (60 km) of maintained trails and 18.5 miles (29.8 km) of unmaintained trails. Eight trailheads provide access with four of those being above 5,000 feet (1,500 m). The lower elevation trails are Trout Creek and Bearwallow trail. The trailhead of Bearwallow begins on the east side of the wilderness and crosses the southern and western slopes of Saint John Mountain (6,719 ft).

The Milk Ranch Loop Trail is nine miles (14 km) long and crosses privately owned land of the Milk Ranch. Permission from the owner allows using the trail, but no camping. The name "Milk Ranch" comes from one of the first settlers to the mountain in the late 19th century, a Mrs. Tobobin who operated a dairy ranch in the meadow. In the spring the cows would be moved to this higher elevation meadow of the mountain and in autumn, the butter would be brought down to the towns of Williams and Willows to be sold.
