= Sanhedrin Wilderness =

Protected area in California, United States

- Location within California Location within the United States
- Location: Mendocino / Lake counties, California, USA
- Nearest city: Willits, CA
- Coordinates: 39°54′5″N 123°7′25″W
- Area: 10,666 acres (43.16 km^{2})
- Established: 2006
- Governing body: U.S. Forest Service

The Sanhedrin Wilderness is a 10,666-acre (43.16 km^{2}) wilderness within Mendocino National Forest in the North Coast region of Northern California. It was established in 2006 by the Northern California Coastal Wild Heritage Wilderness Act. The name derives from the Sanhedrin, a historical group of Jewish elders.

== Visiting ==
The area offers a distinct wilderness experience: there are currently no managed trails, and the only public access is through the lookout point at Big Signal Peak. However, throughout the area are numerous cattle trails and old roads from before the wilderness designation.

== Flora and Fauna ==
Many rare species call the wilderness home, including Anthony Peak lupine, which only grows in Mendocino National Forest, the northern spotted owl, and threatened steelhead in Whitney and Thomas Creeks. The geology is also notable, with blue-green and red serpentinite soils, and an unstable fault passing through the southern part of the wilderness.

== Expansion ==
In 2022, 917 acres near Thomas Creek were added to the original 10,571-acre wilderness designation via a private land transfer.

== See also ==
- List of U.S. Wilderness Areas
