= Northern California Coastal Wild Heritage Wilderness Act =

The Northern California Coastal Wild Heritage Wilderness Act is a U.S. federal law enacted in 2006 that enlarged existing wilderness boundaries and created new wilderness areas for protection under the National Wilderness Preservation System. These newly designated protected wilderness areas help safeguard habitat for more than 250 endangered species including the California condor and the bristlecone pine, the oldest living trees on earth.

It also added Wild and Scenic status to sections of the Black Butte River, created the Cow Mountain Recreation Area and designated the Elkhorn Ridge Potential Wilderness Area.

The Act was sponsored by Representative Mike Thompson, Senators Barbara Boxer, and Dianne Feinstein; President Barack Obama signed the Act into law on October 17, 2006.

== Timeline ==
May 21, 2002-

Senator Barbara Boxer introduces California Wild Heritage Act of 2002 (S. 2535) in the 107th United States Congress.

" In short, this bill preserves, prevents, and it protects." - Senator Boxer

- Referred to Senate Committee on Energy and Natural Resources. This bill was not enacted.

March 27, 2003-

Bills are introduced in 108th Congress.

- House of Representatives:
  - H.R. 1501, Northern California Coastal Wild Heritage Wilderness Act of 2003 introduced by Representative Mike Thompson.
- Senate:
  - S. 738, introduced by Senator Barbara Boxer.

October 16, 2003-

Companion bills introduced in U.S. House of Representatives:

- H.R. 3325, Southern California Wild Heritage Wilderness and Wild Rivers Act of 2003, introduced by Representative Hilda Solis.
- HR 3327, Representative Mike Thompson's bill titled Northern California Wilderness and Wild Rivers is introduced.

March 4, 2004-

Senator Dianne Feinstein joins Senator Boxer and Representative Mike Thompson in supporting the bill.

December 8, 2004-

U.S. Senate passes Senate bill 738, which was bundled together with several other bills collectively titled H.R. 620. It was then sent to the House for consideration, but the House adjourned before action was taken.

January 4, 2004-

- House bill H.R. 233 introduced in the 109th Congress.
  - Committee and Subcommittee hearings held February 3, 2005, to July 19, 2006.

January 14, 2005-

- Senate bill S. 128 is introduced.
  - Passed Senate by unanimous consent and was sent to the House July 26, 2005.

July 24, 2006-

Debate on bill for 40 minutes.

October 5, 2006-

Bill was presented to President of the United States.

October 17, 2006-

Bill is signed and becomes Public Law No. 109–362

== Details ==
New Wilderness
Name	Area	Agency	County
Sanhedrin	10,571 acres (42.78 km^{2})	Mendocino National Forest	Mendocino, Lake
Yuki	53,887 acres (218.07 km^{2})	Mendocino National Forest	Mendocino, Lake
Mount Lassic	7,279 acres (29.46 km^{2})	Six Rivers National Forest	Humboldt, Trinity
Cache Creek	27,245 acres (110.26 km^{2})	Bureau of Land Management	Lake
Cedar Roughs	6,350 acres (25.7 km^{2})	Bureau of Land Management	Napa
South Fork Eel River	12,915 acres (52.27 km^{2})	Bureau of Land Management	Mendocino
King Range	43,585 acres (176.38 km^{2})	Bureau of Land Management	Mendocino, Humboldt

Wilderness Additions
Name	Area	Agency	Total
Trinity Alps Wilderness	22,863 acres (92.52 km^{2})	Six Rivers National Forest	525,627 acres (2,127.14 km^{2})
Snow Mountain Wilderness	23,706 acres (95.93 km^{2})	Mendocino National Forest	50,076 acres (202.65 km^{2})
Yolla Bolly-Middle Eel Wilderness	27,036 acres (109.41 km^{2})	Mendocino National Forest, Bureau of Land Management	180,877 acres (731.98 km^{2})
Siskiyou Wilderness	30,122 acres (121.90 km^{2})	Six Rivers National Forest	182,802 acres (739.77 km^{2})
