= Hullville, California =

Hullville
- Former settlement
- Location in California
- Coordinates: 39°25′N 122°57′W
- Country: United States
- State: California
- County: Lake

Hullville (also, Gravelly Valley) is a former settlement in Lake County, California, United States. Hullville was located 3 miles (4.8 km) east-southeast of Bear Mountain. It was inundated by Lake Pillsbury.

Hullville was named for settler James Hull. The town once had a hotel, blacksmith and carpentry shops, school, and post office. The local economy centered on cattle and sheep ranching. The townsite of Hullville was destroyed after the completion of Scott Dam in 1920.

The Gravelly Valley post office opened in 1874, changed its name to Hullville in 1889, and closed in 1935.
