= Steelhead and salmon distinct population segments =

Endangered and Threatened Species DPS and ESU U.S. range for Steelhead and Salmon

The National Oceanic and Atmospheric Administration, in cooperation with the U.S. Fish and Wildlife Service and Environmental Protection Agency, groups steelhead and salmon into distinct population segments (DPS). There are currently 15 DPS for steelhead (Oncorhynchus mykiss) and 31 evolutionarily significant units (ESU) for five species of Pacific salmon Oncorhynchus. The boundaries of these areas are used to determine whether specific populations of a species should be designated threatened or endangered species under the Endangered Species Act.

== Steelhead distinct population segment ==
Steelhead Oncorhynchus mykiss
DPS/ESU Name	Initial/Revised status	Current status	Boundary Map
Southern California DPS	Endangered (1997), (2006)	Endangered (2011)	
South-Central California Coast DPS	Endangered (1997), Threatened (2006)	Threatened (2011)	
California Central Valley DPS	Threatened (1998), (2006)	Threatened (2011)	
Central California Coast DPS	Threatened (1998), (2006)	Threatened (2011)	
Northern California DPS	Threatened (1998), (2006)	Threatened (2011)	
Klamath Mountains Province DPS			
Lower Columbia River DPS	Threatened (1998), (2006)	Threatened (2011)	
Middle Columbia River DPS	Threatened (1999), (2006)	Threatened (2011)	
Oregon Coast DPS			
Puget Sound DPS	Threatened (1997)	Threatened (2011)	
Olympic Peninsula DPS			
Snake River Basin DPS	Threatened (1997), (2006)	Threatened (2011)	
Southwest Washington DPS			
Upper Columbia River DPS	Endangered (1997), Threatened (2006), Endangered (2007), Threatened (2009)	Threatened (2011)	
Upper Willamette River DPS	Threatened (1999), (2006)	Threatened (2011)	

== Pacific salmon evolutionarily significant unit ==
Chinook salmon Oncorhynchus tshawytscha
DPS/ESU Name	Initial/Revised status	Current status	Boundary Map
Central Valley Spring-run ESU	Threatened (1995), (2005)	Threatened (2011)	
Central Valley Fall-run and Late Fall-run ESU			
California Coast ESU	Threatened (1999), (2005) including hatchery stocks	Threatened (2011)	
Oregon Coast ESU			
Mid-Columbia River Spring-run ESU			
Lower Columbia River ESU	Threatened (1999), (2005)	Threatened (2011)	
Deschutes River Summer/Fall-run ESU			
Southern Oregon & Northern California Coastal ESU			
Snake River Spring/Summer-run ESU	Threatened (1992), (2005)	Threatened (2011)	
Snake River Fall-run ESU	Threatened (1992), (2005)	Threatened (2011)	
Sacramento River Winter-run ESU	Threatened (1989), (1990), Endangered (1992), Threatened (2004), Endangered (2005)	Endangered (2011)	
Puget Sound ESU	Threatened (1995), (2005)	Threatened (2001)	
Washington Coast ESU			
Upper Willamette River ESU	Threatened (1999), (2005)	Threatened (2011)	
Upper Klamath-Trinity Rivers ESU			
Upper Columbia River Summer/Fall-run ESU			
Upper Columbia River Spring-run ESU	Endangered (1999), (2005)	Endangered (2011)	
Coho salmon Oncorhynchus kisutch
DPS/ESU Name	Initial/Revised status	Current status	Boundary Map
Central California Coast ESU	Endangered (1996), (2005) including hatchery stocks	Endangered (2011)	
Lower Columbia River ESU	Threatened (2005)	Threatened (2011)	
Olympic Peninsula ESU			
Oregon Coast ESU			
Puget Sound/Strait of Georgia ESU			
Southern Oregon/Northern California ESU	Threatened (1997), (2005)	Threatened (2011)	
Southwest Washington ESU			
Sockeye salmon Oncorhynchus nerka
DPS/ESU Name	Initial/Revised status	Current status	Boundary Map
Baker River ESU			
Lake Pleasant ESU			
Lake Wenatchee ESU			
Okanogan River ESU			
Ozette Lake ESU	Threatened (1999), (2005)	Threatened (2011)	
Quniault Lake ESU			
Snake River ESU	Endangered (1991), (2005)	Endangered (2011)	
Chum salmon Oncorhynchus keta
DPS/ESU Name	Initial/Revised status	Current status	Boundary Map
Columbia River ESU	Threatened (1999), (2005)	Threatened (2011)	
Hood Canal Summer-run ESU	Threatened (1995), (2005)	Threatened (2001)	
Pacific Coast ESU			
Puget Sound/Strait of Georgia ESU			
Pink salmon Oncorhynchus gorbuscha
DPS/ESU Name	Initial/Revised status	Current status	Boundary Map
Even-year ESU			
Odd-year ESU			
