= Saint John Mountain (California) =

Mountain in California, United States

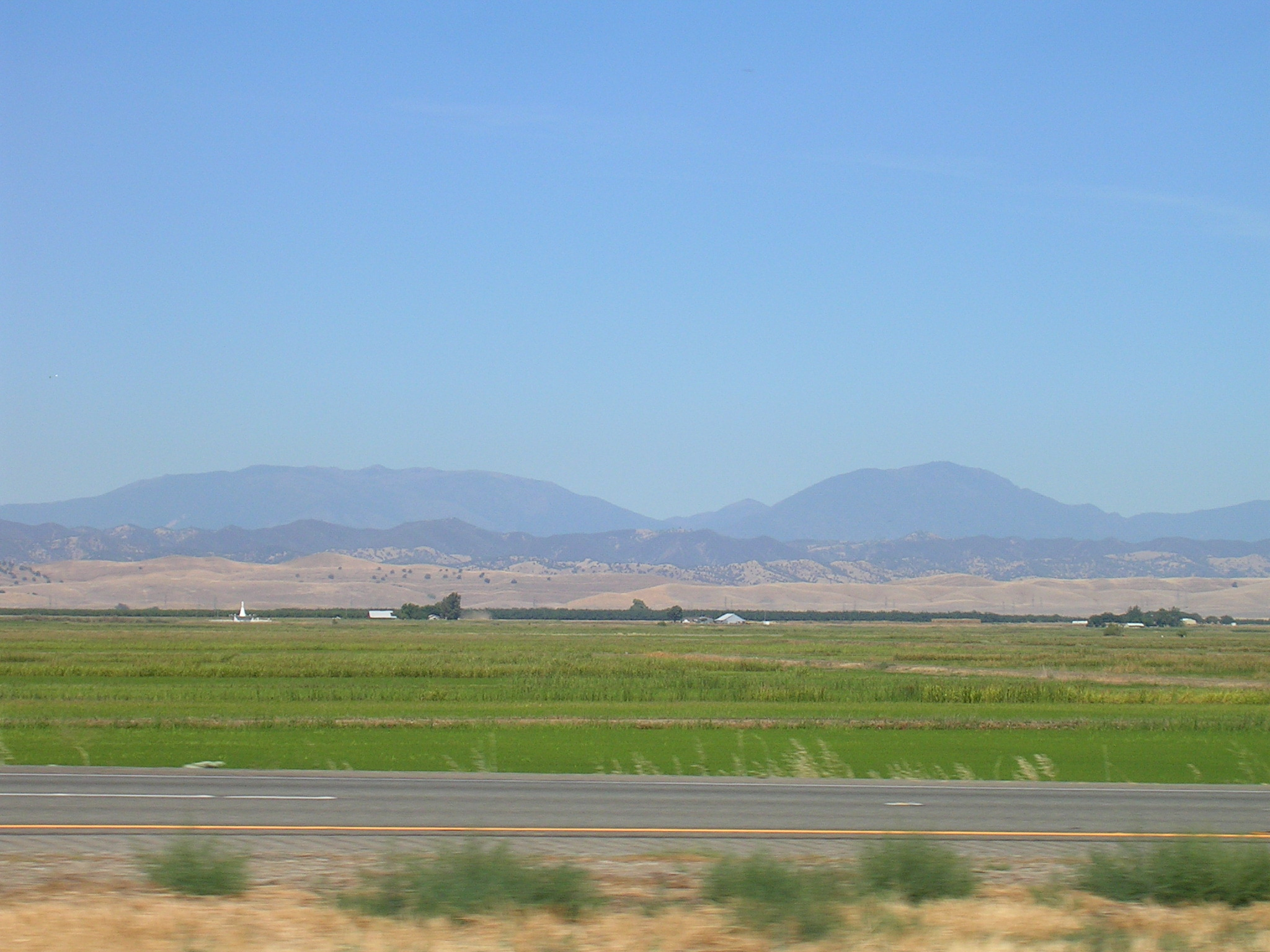
- Snow Mountain's massif (left) and Saint John Mountain (right)

Highest point
- Elevation: 6,749 ft (2,057 m) NAVD 88
- Prominence: 1,826 ft (557 m)
- Coordinates: 39°26′04″N 122°41′35″W

Geography
- Location within California Location within the United States
- Location: Glenn County, California, U.S.
- Parent range: Northern Coast Ranges
- Topo map: USGS Saint John Mountain

Saint John Mountain is a mountain located in the Northern Coast Ranges of California. It is located just to the north of Snow Mountain in the Mendocino National Forest. The peak is high enough to receive snowfall in winter.
