= Trinity National Forest =

Former national forest in California

Trinity National Forest was established as the Trinity Forest Reserve by the U.S. Forest Service in California on April 26, 1905, with 1,243,042 acres (5,030.41 km^{2}). It became a National Forest on March 4, 1907. On July 1, 1908, it gave up some acreage to California National Forest. In 1954 it was combined administratively with Shasta National Forest to create Shasta-Trinity National Forest. Trinity National Forest is located overwhelmingly in Trinity County, which has 89.46% of its acreage. In descending order of land area the rest of the counties are Tehama with 7.37%, Shasta with 2.93%, and Humboldt with 0.23%. There are local ranger district offices in Hayfork and Weaverville. Its administrative offices reside in Redding, as part of the combined Shasta-Trinity National Forest. As of 30 September 2008, the Forest has an area of 1,043,677 acres (4,223.61 km^{2}), comprising 47.23% of the combined Shasta-Trinity's total 2,209,832 acres (8,942.87 km^{2}).
