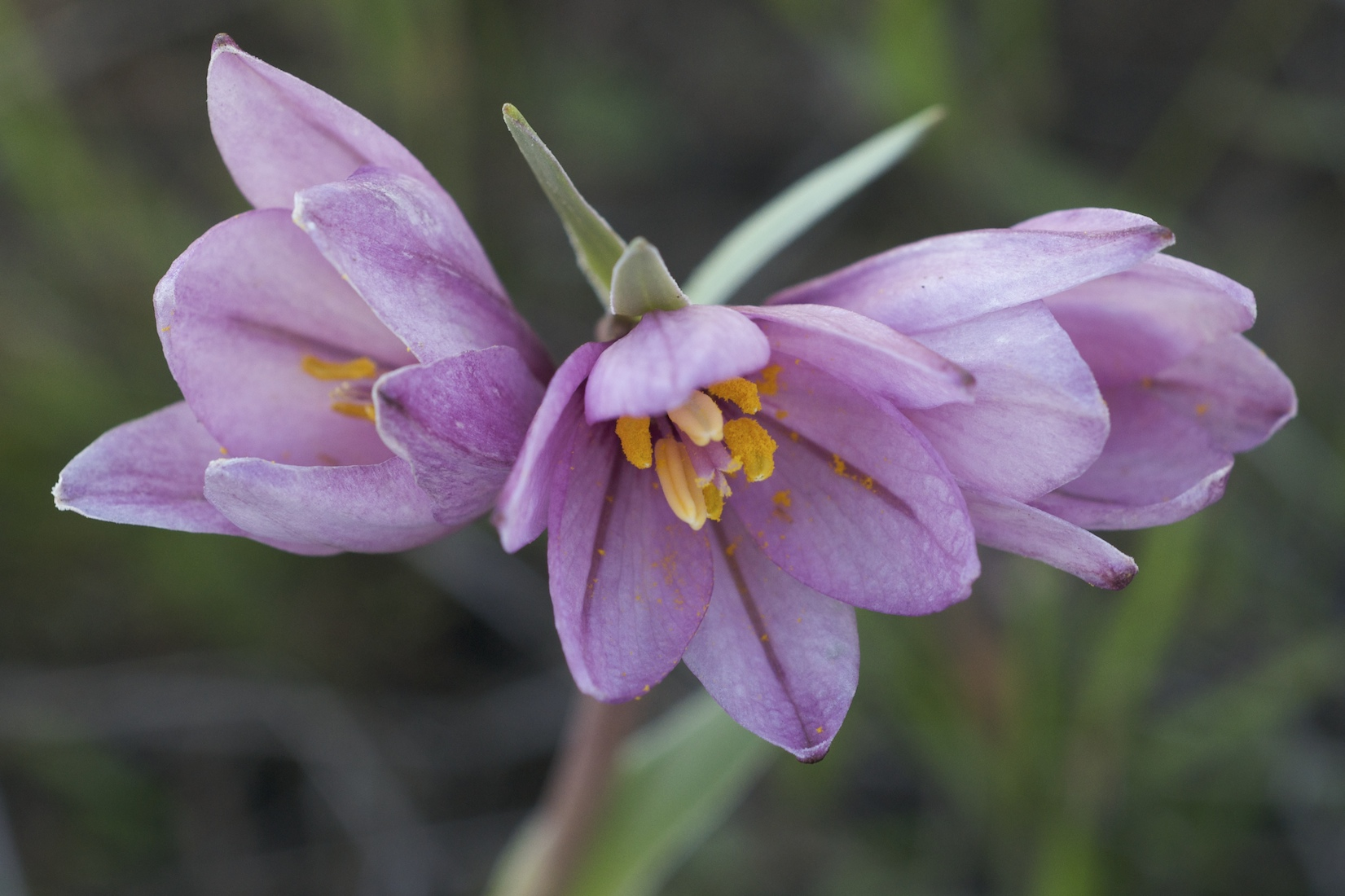

Conservation status
- Imperiled (NatureServe)

Scientific classification
- Kingdom: Plantae
- Clade: Tracheophytes
- Clade: Angiosperms
- Clade: Monocots
- Order: Liliales
- Family: Liliaceae
- Subfamily: Lilioideae
- Tribe: Lilieae
- Genus: Fritillaria
- Species: F. pluriflora

Binomial name
- Fritillaria pluriflora Torr. ex Benth.

Synonyms
- Liliorhiza piattiana Kellogg ex Curran

= Fritillaria pluriflora =

Species of flowering plant

Fritillaria pluriflora is a rare California fritillary known as adobe lily. This wildflower is mainly limited to northern California. It grows in adobe clay soils of the Coast Ranges and low hills in the Central Valley from Tehama and Mendocino Counties south to Solano County.

== Description ==
Fritillaria pluriflora produces an erect stem reaching heights between 10 and 50 cm (4 and 20 in). It has up to ten thick, long, oval-shaped leaves with wavy margins, most of which are clustered at ground level. The nodding flower has bright pink tepals each one up to 4 cm (1.6 in) long. At the center of the flower is a pinkish to yellowish nectary and bright yellow anthers.
