= Mendocino National Forest =

National forest in Northern California

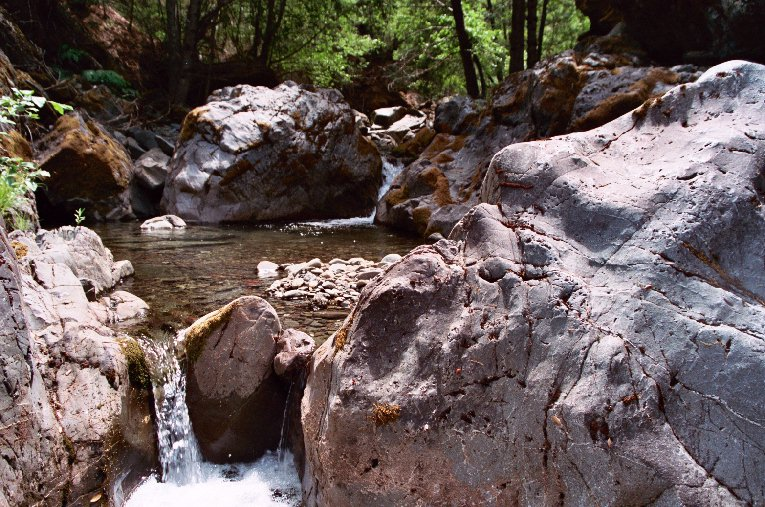
- Rattlesnake Creek
- Interactive map of Mendocino National Forest
- Nearest city: Willows and Covelo California
- Coordinates: 39°33′45″N 122°48′45″W
- Area: 913,306 acres (3,696.02 km^{2})
- Established: 1907
- Governing body: U.S. Forest Service / Department of Agriculture
- Website: Mendocino National Forest

The Mendocino National Forest is located in the Coastal Mountain Range in northwestern California and comprises 913,306 acres (3,696.02 km^{2}). It is the only national forest in the state of California without a major paved road entering it. There are a variety of recreational opportunities — camping, hiking, mountain biking, paragliding, backpacking, boating, fishing, hunting, nature study, photography, and off-highway vehicle travel.

The forest lies in parts of six counties. In descending order of forestland area they are Lake, Glenn, Mendocino, Tehama, Trinity, and Colusa counties. Forest headquarters are located in Willows, California. There are local ranger district offices in Covelo, Upper Lake, and Stonyford.

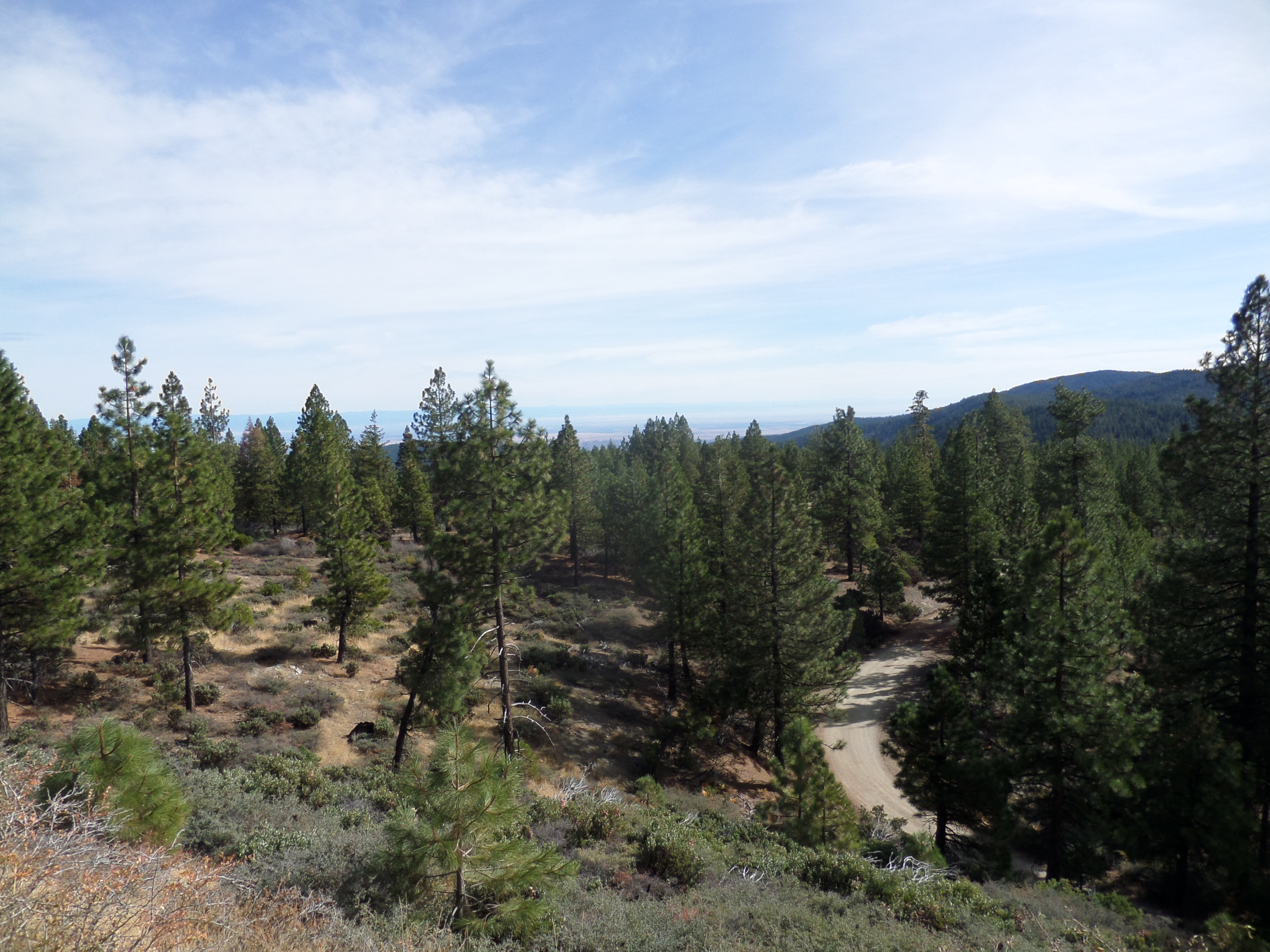
Alder Springs Road in Mendocino National Forest looking east

== Wilderness areas ==
The forest includes four wilderness areas:

- Sanhedrin Wilderness - 10,571 acres (42.78 km^{2})
- Snow Mountain Wilderness — 60,076 acres (243.12 km^{2})
- Yolla Bolly-Middle Eel Wilderness — 180,877 acres (731.98 km^{2}) (partly in Trinity NF, Six Rivers NF, or on BLM land)
- Yuki Wilderness - 53,887 acres (218.07 km^{2}) (partly on BLM land)

The Sanhedrin and Yuki wildernesses were signed into law on October 17, 2006. This legislation, entitled "Northern California Coastal Wild Heritage Wilderness Act", added areas to both the Yolla Bolly - Middle Eel Wilderness and Snow Mountain Wilderness, and established the two new wilderness areas in the Mendocino National Forest.

== Rivers, lakes, and hot springs ==
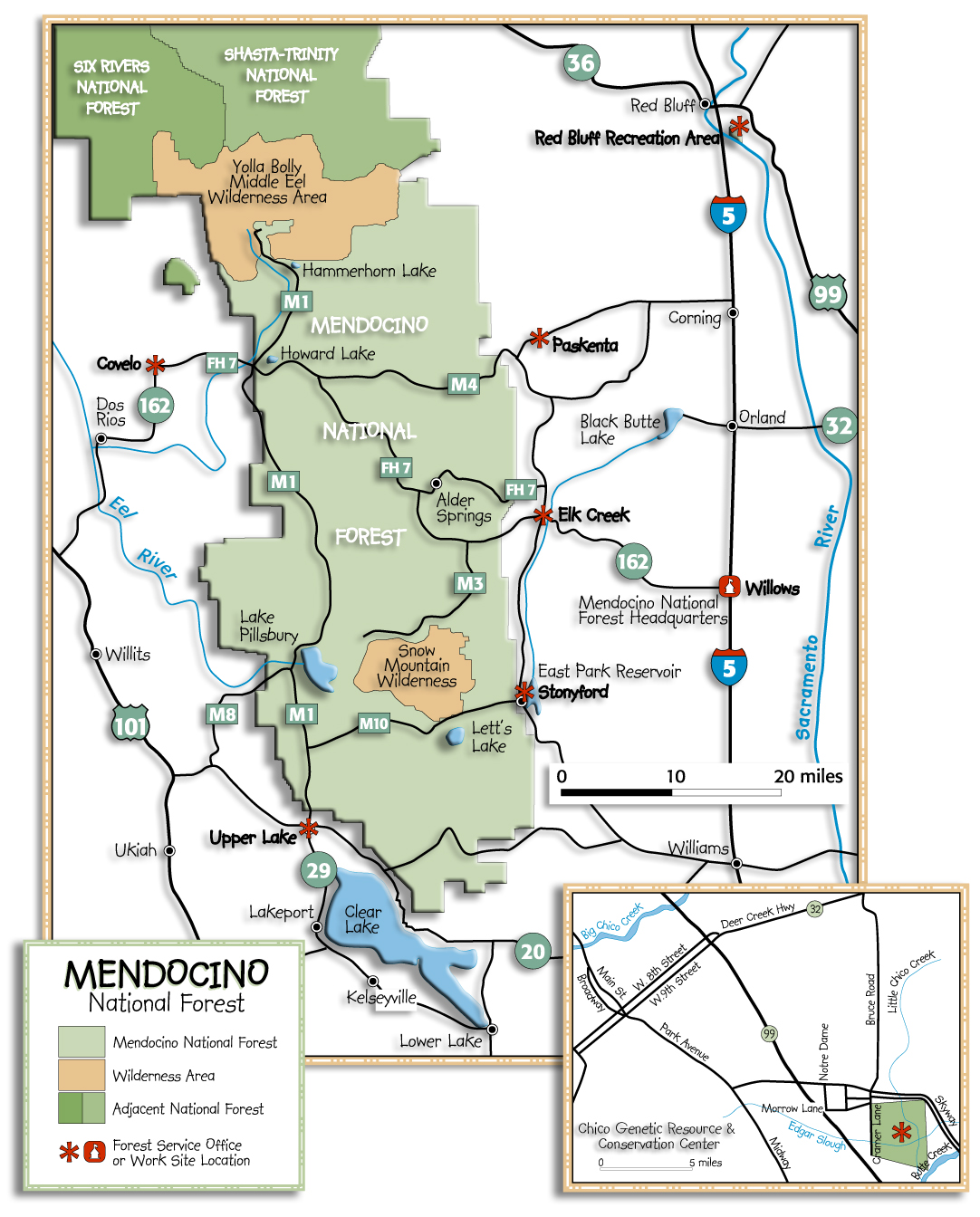

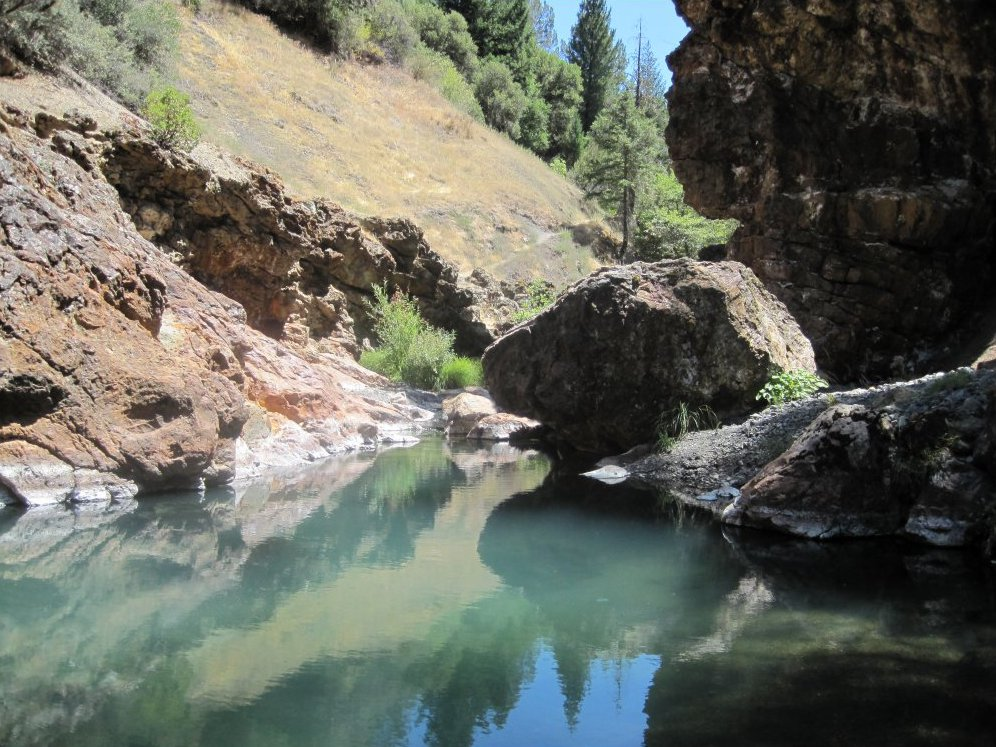
Rice Fork Eel River at Crabtree Hot Springs

Rivers include: Eel River, Rice Fork Eel River, Middle Fork Eel River, Black Butte River, and Stony Creek (Sacramento River).

Lake Pillsbury is the largest recreational lake in the forest at 2,280 acres (9.2 km^{2}) and offers boat ramps, camping and resorts.

Letts Lake, southeast of Lake Pillsbury is 35 acres (140,000 m^{2}) in size and has hiking trails, campgrounds and is close to trailheads into Snow Mountain Wilderness.

Other lakes include Plaskett Lakes in the middle of the forest, Howard, Hammerhorn, Square and Long Lakes near Yolla Bolly-Middle Eel Wilderness in the northern portion.

== History ==
In 1905, the first surveys of public domain lands were conducted by Professor Lachie of the University of California, Berkeley, working under the direction of Gifford Pinchot, Chief of the United States Forest Service, to determine what land should be included in a forest reserve. Also in 1905, the U.S. Congress moved the reserves from the General Land Office in the Department of the Interior to the new Division of Forestry in the Department of Agriculture. The Division of Forestry became the U.S. Forest Service.

President Theodore Roosevelt set aside the reserve (as authorized by the Forest Reserve Act of 1891) on February 6, 1907, as the Stony Creek Forest Reserve and one month later, the reserve was added to the national forest system as the Stony Creek National Forest.

Because of the difficulty of managing such a large tract of land, the northern portion was reassigned to Trinity National Forest. Afterwards, the final boundaries of the new Stony Creek forest were drawn and signed into law by executive order of the president on July 2, 1908, and renamed the California National Forest.

=== Yet another name ===
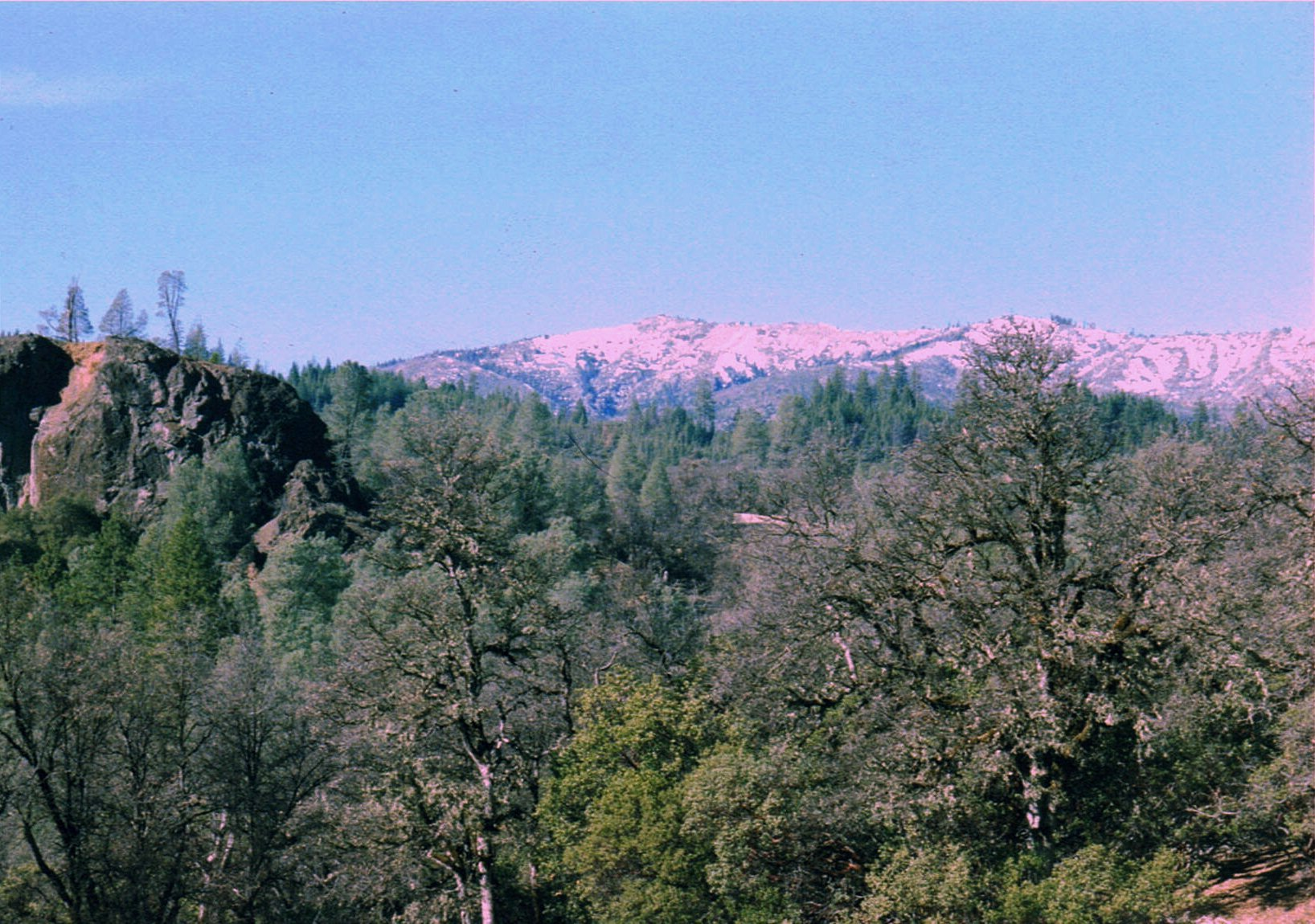
Sanhedrin Mountains of Mendocino National Forest

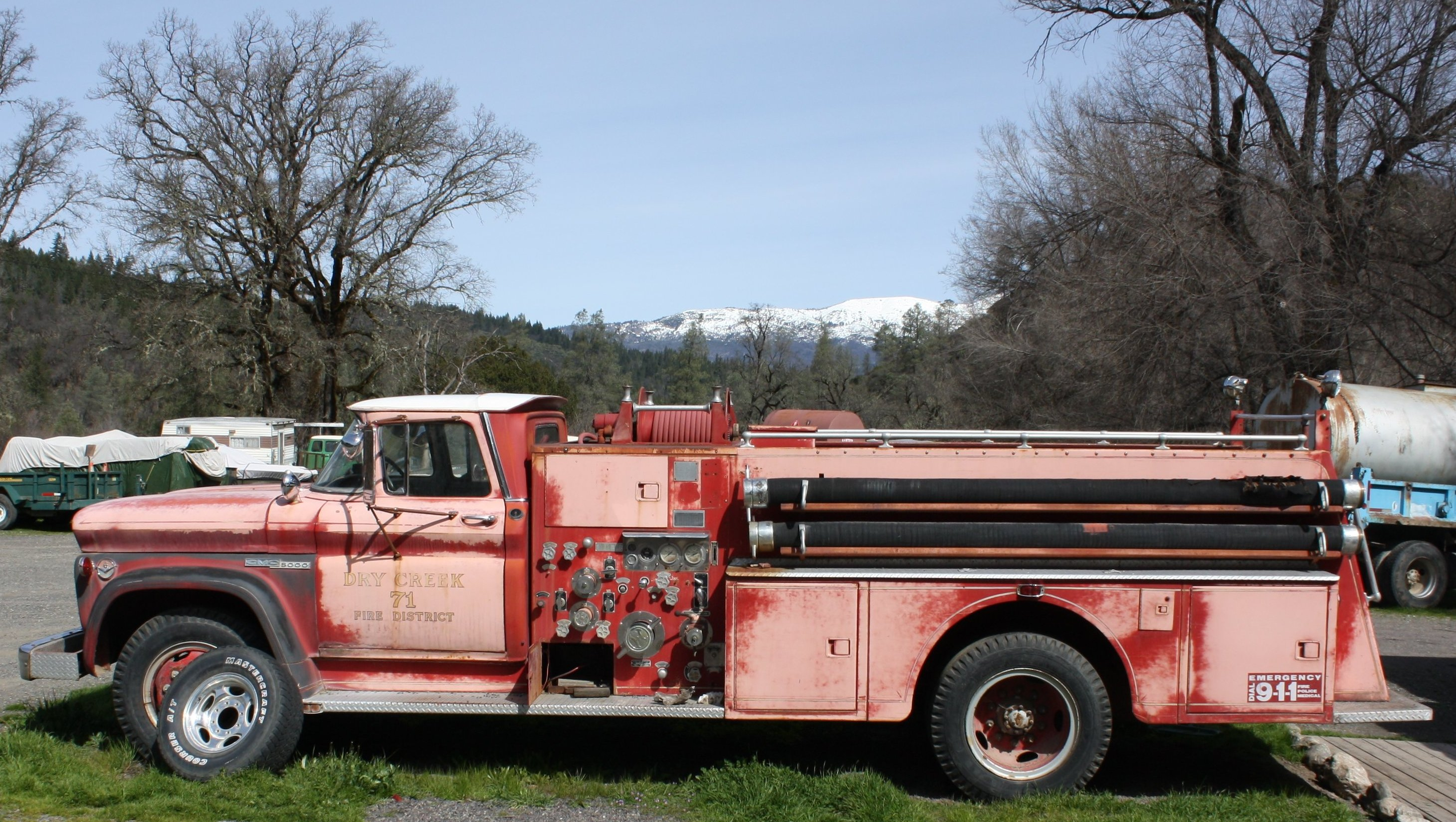
#71 Dry Creek Fire District truck at Lake Pillsbury, 2010

"In order to avoid the confusion growing out of the state and a national forest therein having the same name", President Herbert Hoover signed executive order 5885 renaming California National Forest to Mendocino National Forest on July 12, 1932.

The development of the forest increased to 81 offices, lookouts and guard stations until improvements in transportation and communications allowed some offices to be closed. Today, there are three ranger districts with some of the former guard stations now being utilized as "work centers" that are primarily staffed by fire crews. Two areas managed by the Mendocino National Forest are outside the contiguous boundaries. They are the Genetic Research Center in Chico, California and the Lake Red Bluff Recreation Area in central California.

=== Genetic Research Center ===
Acquired by the Forest Service in 1974, the Genetic Research Center was originally a plant breeding research and plant introduction facility that was started in 1904, on a 209-acre (85 ha) site under the Agriculture Research Service. The center's research gradually changed to developing and producing genetically improved plant material for the reforestation program of the Pacific Southwest Region. Major work is done in the areas of biological, chemical, and clinical research on anti-cancer drugs derived from plants.

== Wildfires ==
The infamous Rattlesnake Fire occurred here in 1953. One Forest Service employee and 14 volunteer firefighters perished. The circumstances of the tragedy resulted in major changes in firefighting strategy and training. The firefighters are memorialized at the Rattlesnake Fire Memorial overlooking Rattlesnake Canyon. Access to it can be found off of Forest Highway 7 on County Road 307/Alder Springs Road.

The Trough Fire burned almost 25,000 acres (100 km^{2}) of the Mendocino National Forest in 2001 including land in the Snow Mountain Wilderness.

Between late July and early September 2018, the Mendocino Complex Fire burned approximately 284,000 acres (1,150 km^{2}) in the southern portion of the forest, or around one-third of the forest's total area. One firefighter was killed by falling debris near Lake Pillsbury on August 13. The burned area included the entire Snow Mountain Wilderness.

Originating as 38 separate fires started by lightning on August 16 and 17, 2020, the August Complex Fire became the largest wildfire in California history. The fire was primarily burning through the Mendocino National Forest, and grew to over 1,026,000 acres.

== Wildlife ==
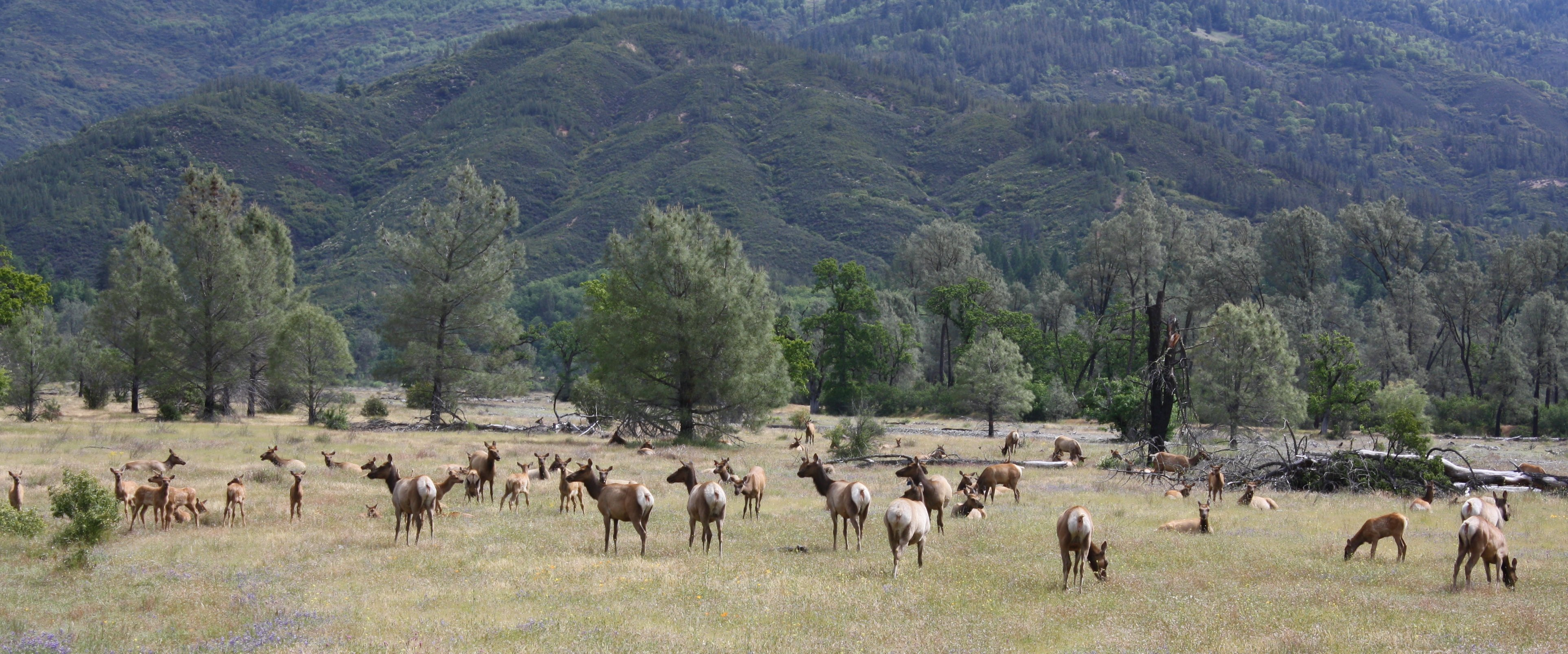
Tule elk herd at Lake Pillsbury

The tule elk is one of the largest land mammals native to California, with cows weighing up to 350 pounds, and the largest bulls weighing roughly 500 pounds. Hunted to near extinction during the state's gold rush era, the animals were reintroduced to the Lake Pillsbury Basin in the late 1970s by the California Department of Fish and Game, and the herd has steadily grown, numbering around 80 in 2007.

The elk live on the north shore of the lake at the bottom of Hull Mountain, and enjoy wild clovers and grasses, along with the green summer and fall foliage around Lake Pillsbury's edges. Mendocino National Forest and Los Padres National Forest are the only two national forests in California to have tule elk. There is a 10-day hunting season beginning on the second Wednesday in September each year.

== Vegetation ==
An estimated 60,000 acres (240 km^{2}) of old growth occur here, including forests of Coast Douglas-fir (Pseudotsuga menziesii var. menziesii), Ponderosa Pine (Pinus ponderosa), White Fir (Abies concolor), Tanoak (Lithocarpus densiflorus), and Pacific madrone (Arbutus menziesii).

== See also ==
- List of national forests of the United States
