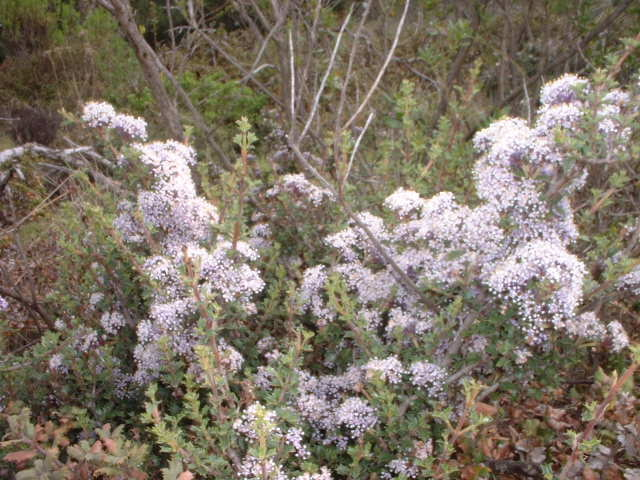

Conservation status
- Imperiled (NatureServe)

Scientific classification
- Kingdom: Plantae
- Clade: Tracheophytes
- Clade: Angiosperms
- Clade: Eudicots
- Clade: Rosids
- Order: Rosales
- Family: Rhamnaceae
- Genus: Ceanothus
- Species: C. sonomensis

Binomial name
- Ceanothus sonomensis J.T.Howell

= Ceanothus sonomensis =

Species of flowering plant

Ceanothus sonomensis, with the common name Sonoma ceanothus, is a rare species of shrub in the family Rhamnaceae. It is endemic to northern California.

== Description ==
The Ceanothus sonomensis shrub is erect in form, approaching a maximum height of one meter. The flat evergreen leaves are oppositely arranged, each oval to rounded in shape with spiny teeth along the edges. They are shiny green on top, paler and fuzzy on the undersides. The inflorescence is a small cluster of blue or lavender flowers, and the fruit is a ridged, horned capsule about half a centimeter long.

== Distribution ==
Ceanothus sonomensis is known only from the Hood Mountain Range. Most of its 10 or so occurrences are located in Sonoma County, and one remains in Napa County. Ceanothus sonomensis is a member of the chaparral plant community in the California montane chaparral and woodlands sub-ecoregion.
