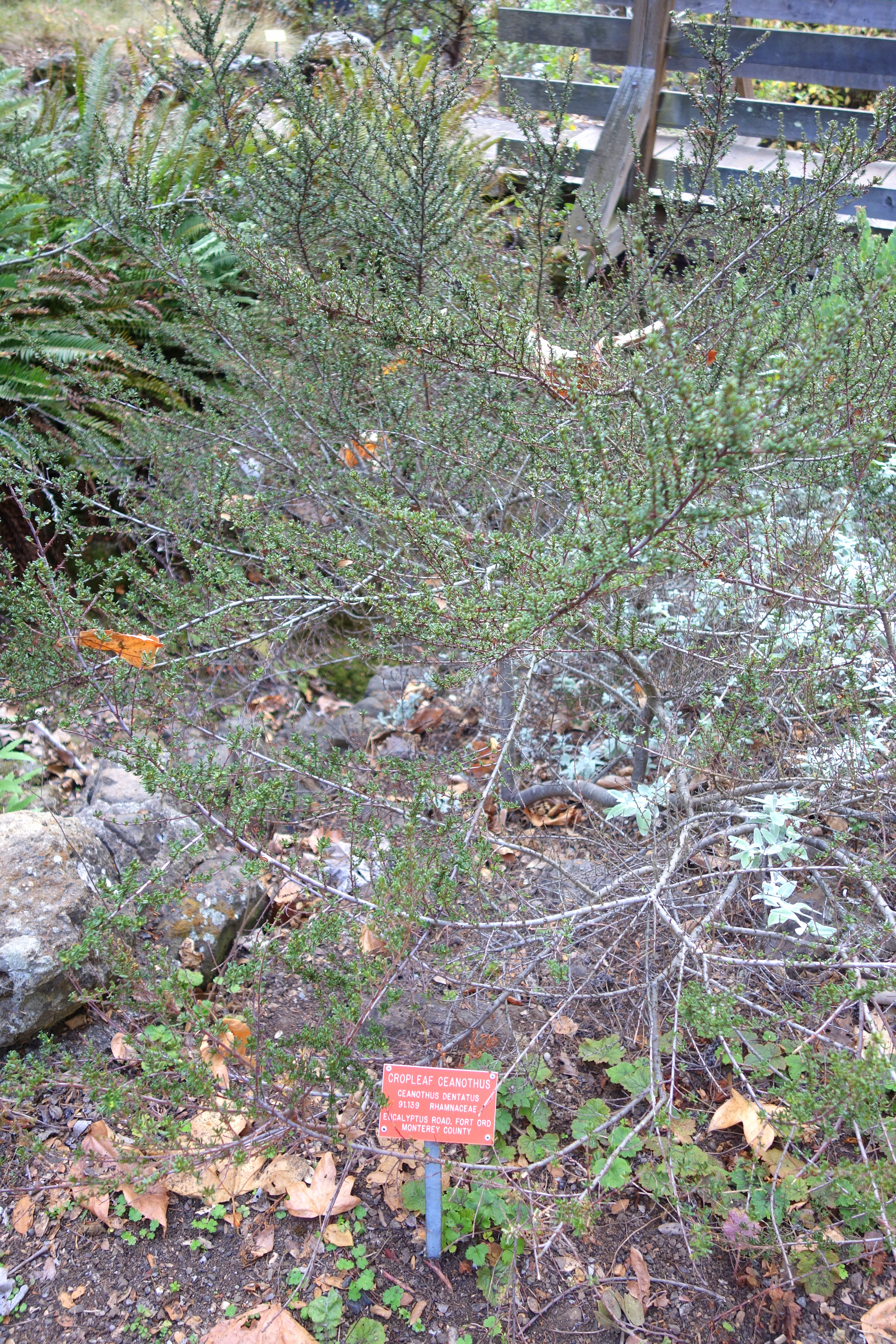

Conservation status
- Imperiled (NatureServe)

Scientific classification
- Kingdom: Plantae
- Clade: Tracheophytes
- Clade: Angiosperms
- Clade: Eudicots
- Clade: Rosids
- Order: Rosales
- Family: Rhamnaceae
- Genus: Ceanothus
- Species: C. dentatus

Binomial name
- Ceanothus dentatus Torr. & A.Gray

= Ceanothus dentatus =

Species of flowering plant

Ceanothus dentatus is a species of shrub in the family Rhamnaceae known by the common name sandscrub ceanothus. It is endemic to California, where it is known only from the Central Coast and its Coast Ranges. It grows in coastal hills, bluffs, and canyons.

== Description ==
This shrub produces a highly branched, spreading stem up to about 1.5 meters tall. The evergreen leaves are alternately arranged and often borne in clusters. Each is under 2 centimeters long, toothed along the edges, wavy and turned under along the margins to appear somewhat ruffled. They are hairy and covered in tiny glandular bumps, the upper surfaces dark shiny green and the undersides paler. The inflorescence is a small cluster of many bright blue flowers. The fruit is a lobed, crested capsule about 4 millimeters wide.
