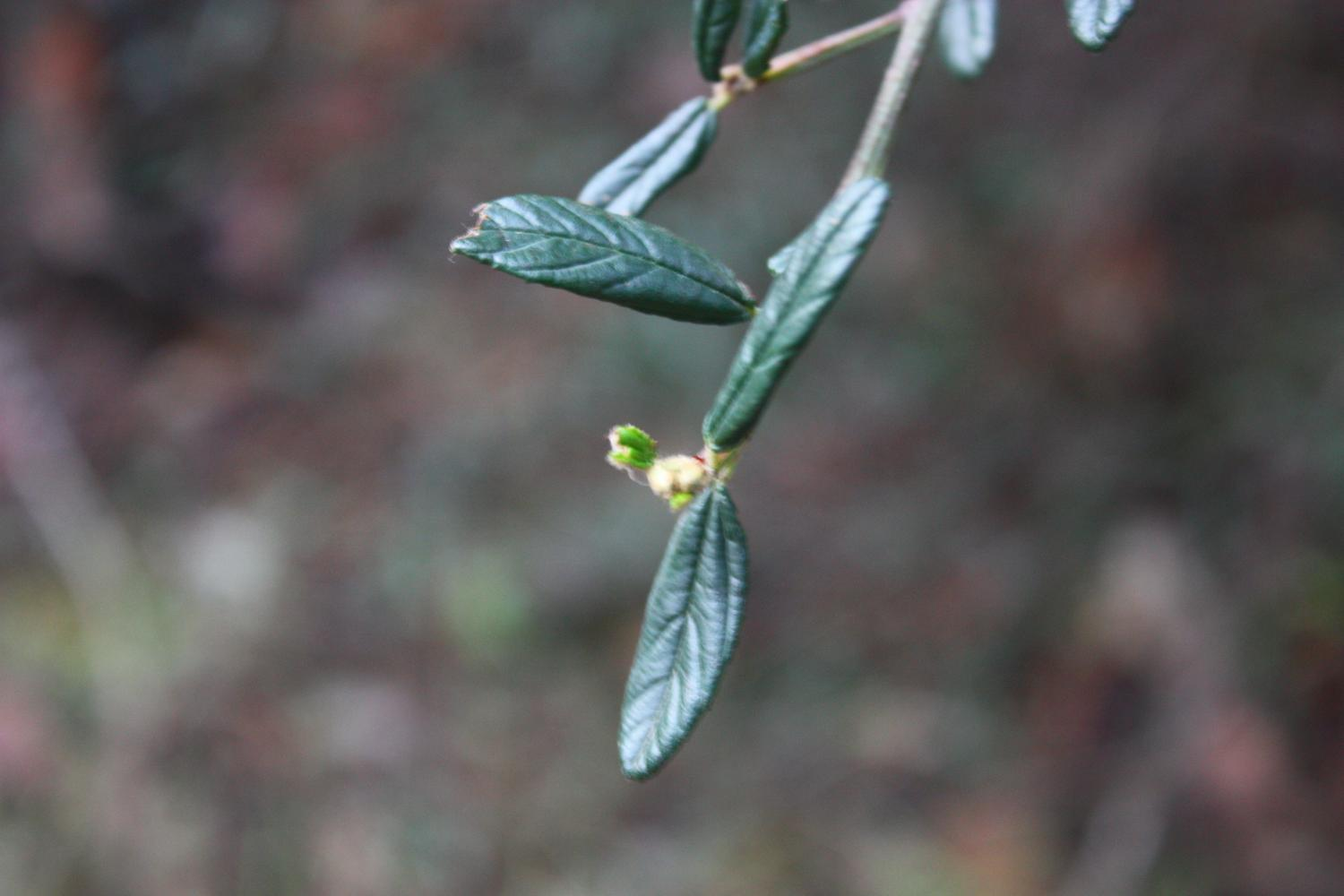

Conservation status
- Vulnerable (NatureServe)

Scientific classification
- Kingdom: Plantae
- Clade: Tracheophytes
- Clade: Angiosperms
- Clade: Eudicots
- Clade: Rosids
- Order: Rosales
- Family: Rhamnaceae
- Genus: Ceanothus
- Species: C. parryi

Binomial name
- Ceanothus parryi Trel.

= Ceanothus parryi =

Species of flowering plant

Ceanothus parryi, with the common name Parry ceanothus, is a species of shrub in the buckthorn family Rhamnaceae. It is native to Oregon and northern California, where it grows in the canyons of coastal mountain ranges.

== Description ==
Ceanothus parryi is an erect shrub approaching 5 meters in maximum height. The woody parts are reddish brown and woolly when new, darkening with age and shedding most of the hairs. The evergreen leaves are alternately arranged, oval in shape and edged with glandular teeth. They are dark green and hairless on the upper surfaces, paler and woolly on the undersides. The inflorescence is a long cluster of deep blue flowers, up to about 15 centimeters long. The fruit is a smooth, 3-lobed capsule a few millimeters long.
