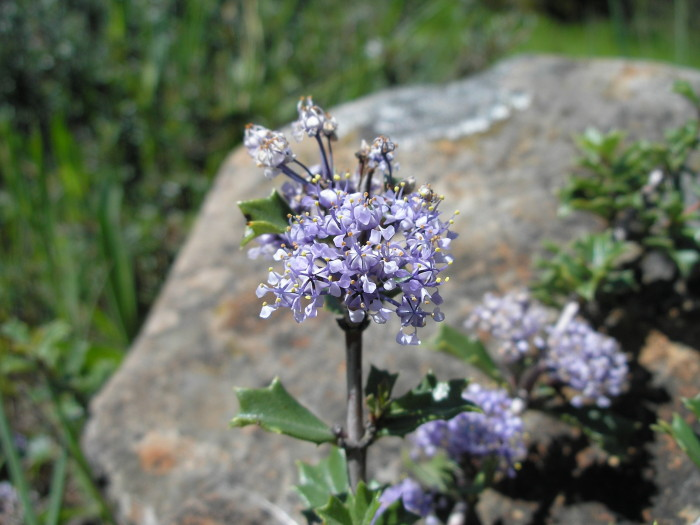

Conservation status
- Critically Imperiled (NatureServe)

Scientific classification
- Kingdom: Plantae
- Clade: Tracheophytes
- Clade: Angiosperms
- Clade: Eudicots
- Clade: Rosids
- Order: Rosales
- Family: Rhamnaceae
- Genus: Ceanothus
- Subgenus: C. subg. Cerastes
- Species: C. confusus

Binomial name
- Ceanothus confusus J.T.Howell

= Ceanothus confusus =

Species of shrub

Ceanothus confusus is a species of shrub in the family Rhamnaceae known by the common name Rincon Ridge ceanothus. It is endemic to northern California where it grows in the coastal mountains north of the San Francisco Bay Area. Its habitats include coniferous forest, woodland, and chaparral. This is a low, spreading shrub often forming a short mat up to about 1.2 meters wide. The stem is gray-brown with new twigs having a reddish color and fuzzy texture. The evergreen leaves are oppositely arranged. Each is up to 2 centimeters long and oval in shape with 3 to 5 large teeth. The upper surface is shiny green and the underside is paler and feltlike in texture with hairs along the veins. The inflorescence is a small cluster of blue or purple flowers. The fruit is a horned capsule about half a centimeter wide.
