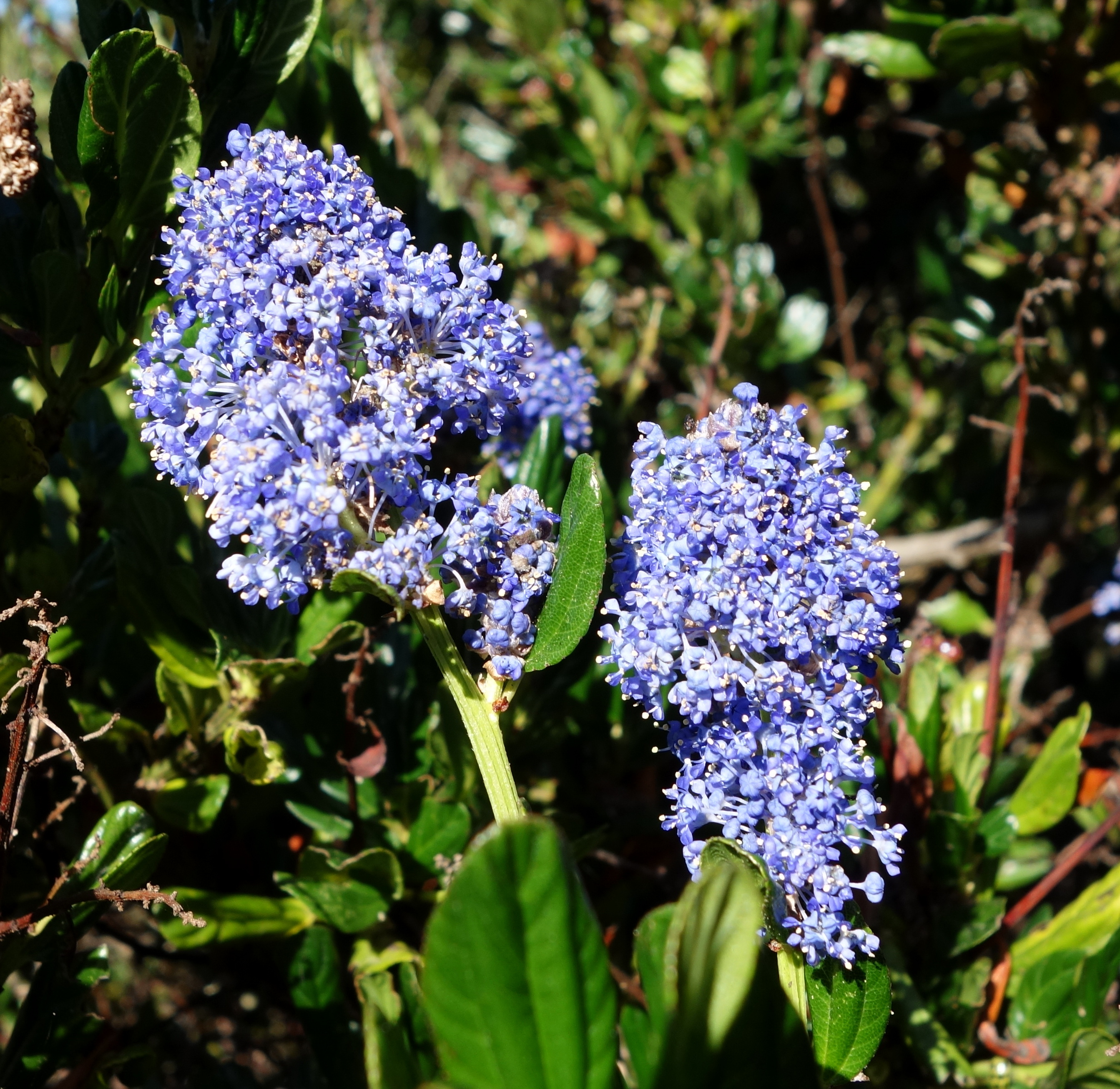

Scientific classification
- Kingdom: Plantae
- Clade: Tracheophytes
- Clade: Angiosperms
- Clade: Eudicots
- Clade: Rosids
- Order: Rosales
- Family: Rhamnaceae
- Genus: Ceanothus
- Species: C. gloriosus

Binomial name
- Ceanothus gloriosus J.T.Howell

= Ceanothus gloriosus =

Species of tree

Ceanothus gloriosus is a species of shrub in the family Rhamnaceae known by the common name Point Reyes ceanothus. It is endemic to California, where it is known from the coastline of the San Francisco Bay Area and areas north and south. It grows on seaside bluffs and the slopes of the coastal mountains. This shrub grows flat and spreading to erect, approaching two meters in maximum size. The evergreen leaves are oppositely arranged and up to 5 centimeters long, rounded to oval in shape. The edges are toothed, the teeth sometimes spine-tipped. The inflorescence is a small cluster of bright blue to purple flowers. The fruit is a horned capsule about 4 millimeters wide.

There are three varieties of this species:

- C. g. var. exaltatus (glory bush) - found north of the Bay Area
- C. g. var. gloriosus (glory mat) - smaller mat-forming variety known mainly from Marin County
- C. g. var. porrectus (Mt. Vision ceanothus) - rare variety endemic to Marin County in the vicinity of Point Reyes

== Cultivation ==
The species, varieties, and cultivars are widely grown by the horticulture industry, and used in gardens and native plant landscaping.
