= Ceanothus depressus =

Scientific classification
- Kingdom: Plantae
- Clade: Tracheophytes
- Clade: Angiosperms
- Clade: Eudicots
- Clade: Rosids
- Order: Rosales
- Family: Rhamnaceae
- Genus: Ceanothus
- Species: C. depressus

Binomial name
- Ceanothus depressus Benth.

Synonyms
- Ceanothus durangoinus Loes.; Ceanothus huichagorare Loes.; Ceanothus pueblensis Standl.

Species of flowering plant

Ceanothus depressus Benth. is a shrub in the family Rhamnaceae, native to the Mexican states of Chihuahua and Sonora. It is a shrub up to 70 cm tall, growing in clearings in pine-oak forests.

== Uses ==
The Pima Bajo in the vicinity of Yepachic (Chihuahua) and Maycoba (Sonora) refer to the species as "junco," a name more commonly used for Juncus spp. in most of Mexico. They use the aromatic red roots to make a flavorful tea.
