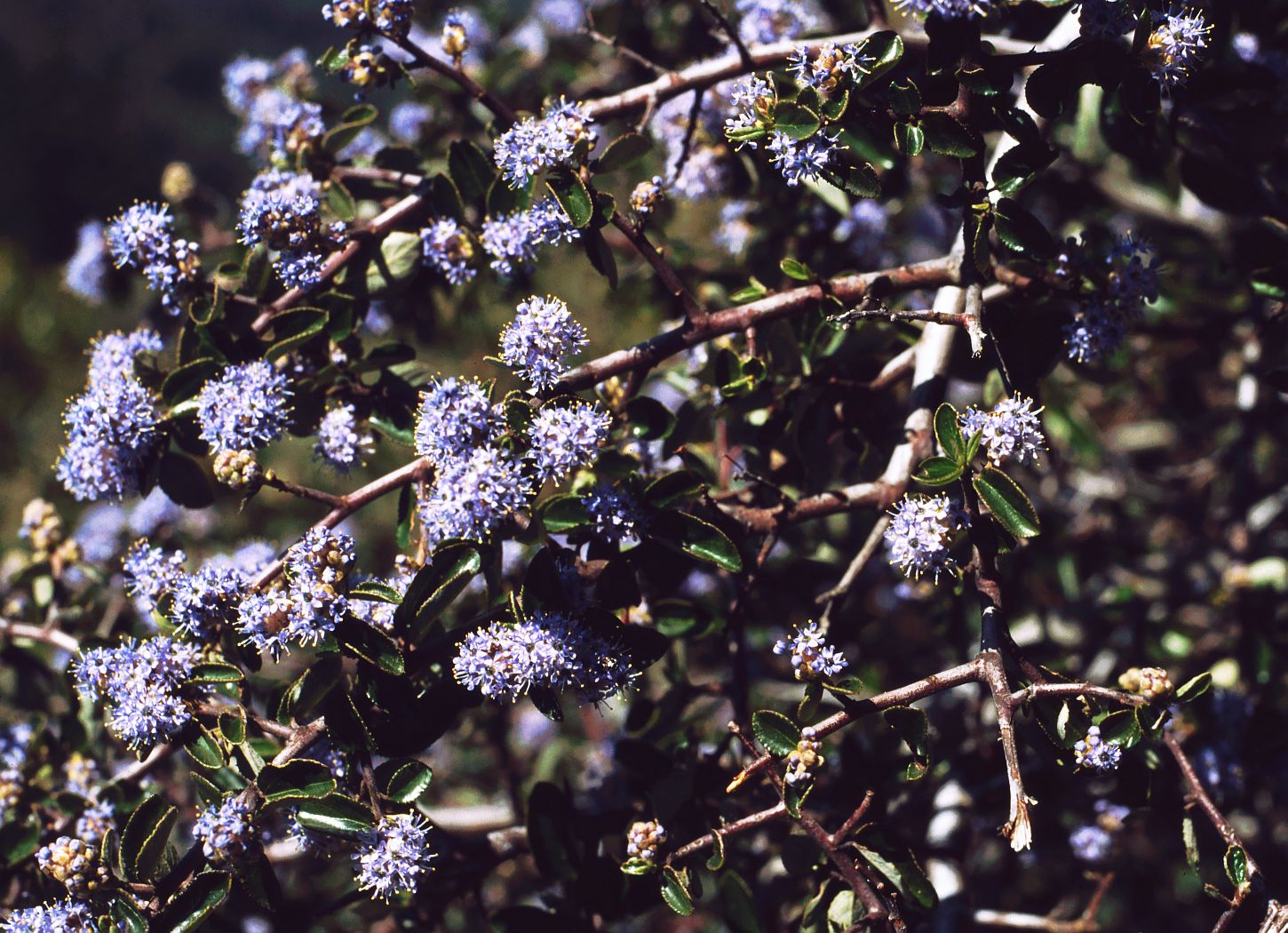

Conservation status
- Vulnerable (NatureServe)

Scientific classification
- Kingdom: Plantae
- Clade: Tracheophytes
- Clade: Angiosperms
- Clade: Eudicots
- Clade: Rosids
- Order: Rosales
- Family: Rhamnaceae
- Genus: Ceanothus
- Species: C. foliosus

Binomial name
- Ceanothus foliosus Parry

= Ceanothus foliosus =

Species of flowering plant

Ceanothus foliosus is a species of flowering shrub known by the common name wavyleaf ceanothus.

== Distribution ==
This Ceanothus is endemic to California, where its distribution extends throughout the Coast Ranges and the northern end of the Peninsular Ranges.

== Description ==
The Ceanothus foliosus shrub may be tall and erect but is generally under two meters in height; it may also be low-lying and sprawling. It has sparse small evergreen leaves only one to two centimeters in length and toothed along the edges with glandular knobs.

The petite inflorescences are borne on naked stalks and are bunched with blue or lavender flowers with prominent yellow anthers. The fruit is a capsule about 4 millimeters long containing usually 3 seeds.
