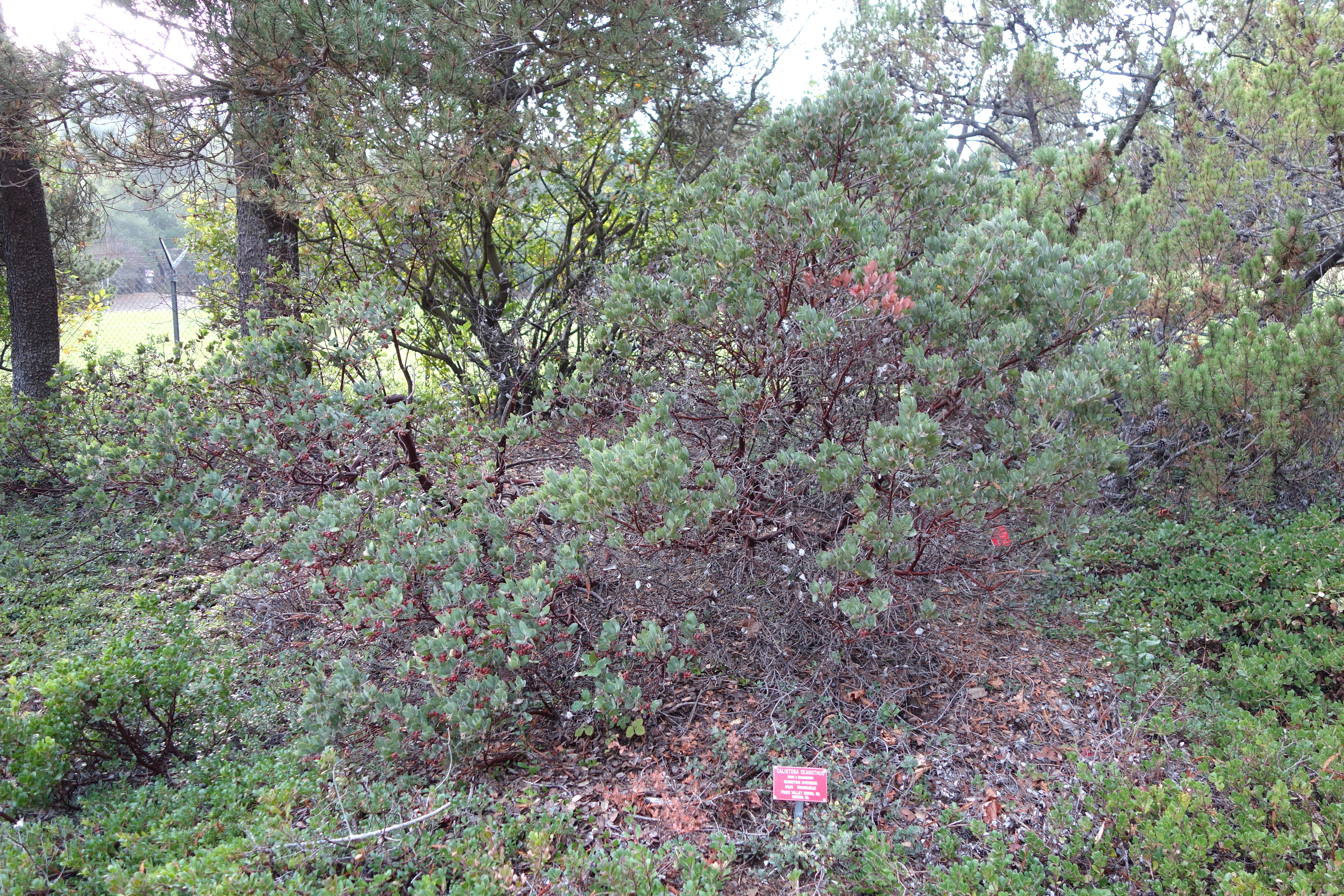
- Ceanothus purpureus subsp. divergens

Conservation status
- Imperiled (NatureServe)

Scientific classification
- Kingdom: Plantae
- Clade: Tracheophytes
- Clade: Angiosperms
- Clade: Eudicots
- Clade: Rosids
- Order: Rosales
- Family: Rhamnaceae
- Genus: Ceanothus
- Species: C. purpureus

Binomial name
- Ceanothus purpureus Jeps.

= Ceanothus purpureus =

Species of flowering plant

Ceanothus purpureus, with the common name Napa ceanothus and hollyleaf ceanothus, is a species of shrub in the family Rhamnaceae. It is endemic to northern California, where it is known only from the Inner North Coast Ranges north of the Bay Area, mainly in Sonoma and Napa Counties. The largest remaining population of this shrub occurs on Mt. George near Napa, where it is protected in a botanical preserve.

== Description ==
The Ceanothus purpureus plant grows in woodland and chaparral habitat. It is spreading or erect in form, approaching 2 meters in maximum height. The woody parts are gray to reddish brown in color. The evergreen leaves are oppositely arranged and up to about 2.5 centimeters long. They are round to oval, wavy, and edged with spiny teeth, resembling the leaf of holly. The inflorescence is a small cluster of blue or purple flowers. The fruit is a horned capsule about half a centimeter long.
