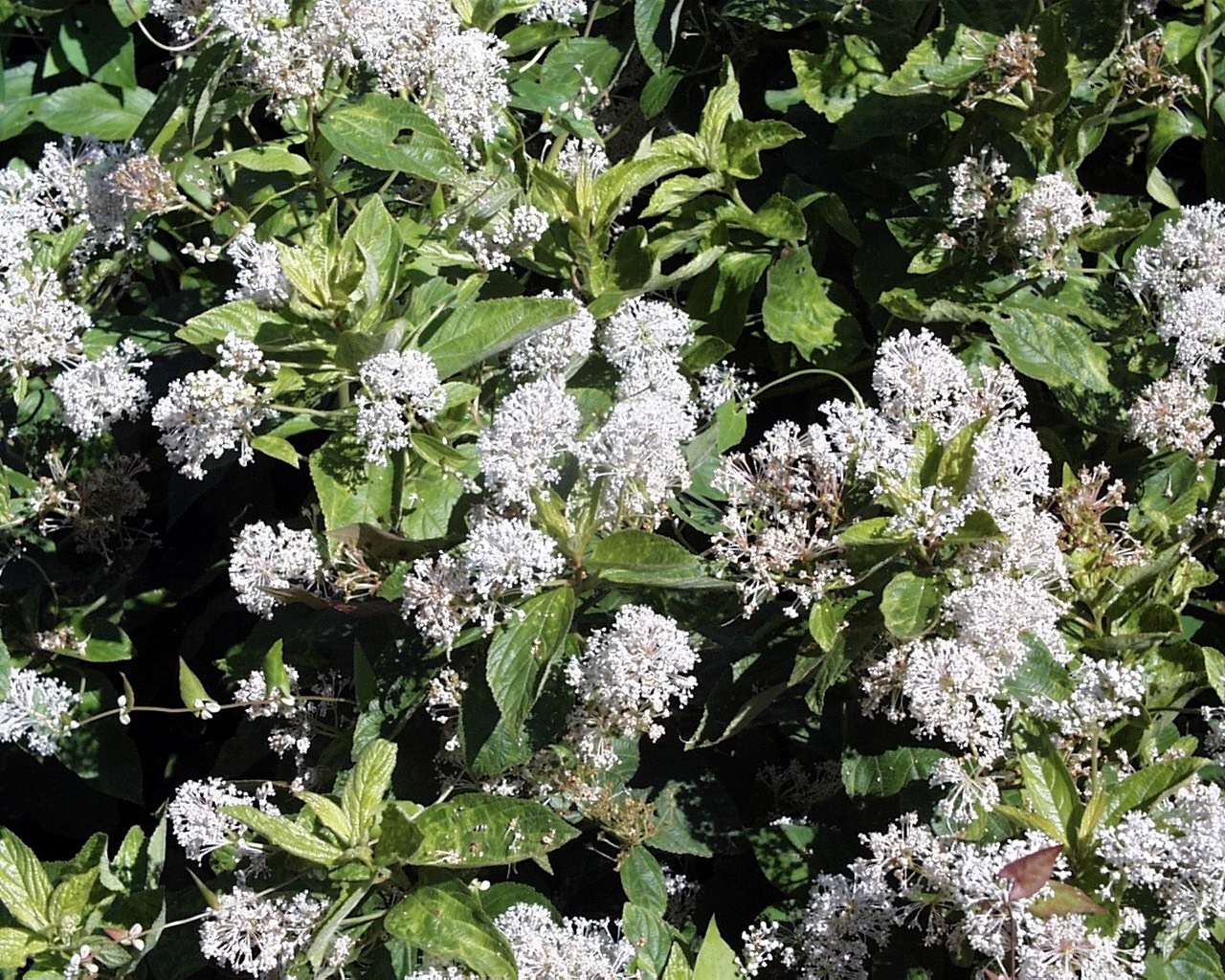
- Ceanothus americanus flowers

Scientific classification
- Kingdom: Plantae
- Clade: Embryophytes
- Clade: Tracheophytes
- Clade: Angiosperms
- Clade: Eudicots
- Clade: Rosids
- Order: Rosales
- Family: Rhamnaceae
- Genus: Ceanothus; L.

Species
- See text

Synonyms
- Forrestia Raf.

= Ceanothus =

Genus of flowering plants

Ceanothus is a genus of about 50–60 species of nitrogen-fixing shrubs and small trees in the buckthorn family (Rhamnaceae). Common names for members of this genus are buckbrush, California lilac, soap bush, or just ceanothus. The genus is native to North America, ranging from Canada and the United States south through Mexico to Panama, with the center of diversity in the California floristic province of the western United States and Mexico, where around ~42 species are endemic out of the roughly ~58 species in the genus. Most Ceanothus are shrubs, with some species rarely tree-like while others have a short mat-like habit. Species of Ceanothus can be evergreen or deciduous, may have thorns, and also have a diverse number of petal colors ranging from cream to deep blue to pink. Some reproduce strictly from seed, while others can resprout from their roots after a fire.

Valued as ornamental plants, prolific hybridization in Ceanothus makes them a popular source of horticultural cultivars, of which there are over 200 named selections. Ornamental Ceanothus hybrids have been cultivated since the 1830s, and a number of them have won the Royal Horticultural Society's Award of Garden Merit.

== Description ==
Ceanothus consists of shrubs that are rarely tree-like, twigs that are thorn-like or not, leaves that are persistent (evergreen) or deciduous in alternate or opposite arrangements (with the stems usually following the leaf arrangement), and generally have a venation on the underside of the leaves that is either pinnate or 3-veined from the base. The inflorescences may be terminal (emerging from the end of branches) or axillary, taking up umbel-like, raceme-like, and panicle-like aggregations of flower clusters. The flowers are bisexual, with 5 petals, and come in a variety of colors from white to cream, blue, purple, or rarely pink. The fruits are capsules, with a more or less spherical shape, generally divided into lobes of 3. Within the fruits are 3 small seeds.

Because of the difficulty in identifying Ceanothus due to the limited barriers in genetic exchange resulting in hybrids, and local and geographical variations within species, special attention must be given to identifying key characteristics of the species. The flower colors and mature fruits are important characters, but finding these characteristics can be challenging due to the short duration of flowering and the long maturation period of the fruits that follows. Other important characters include the life form, understanding the patterns of geographic distribution for the species, and the recognizing the soils preferred by different species.

== Taxonomy ==
"Ceanothus" comes from Ancient Greek: κεάνωθος (keánōthos), which was applied by Theophrastus (371–287 BC) to a spiny Old World plant, believed to be Cirsium arvense.

There are two subgenera within this genus: Ceanothus and Cerastes. The former clade is less drought-resistant, having bigger leaves. The evolution of these two clades likely started with a divergence in the niches filled in local communities, rather than a divergence on the basis of geography. The two clades are also sometimes recognized as sections, with the usage of section or subgenus being inconsistent in the literature on the genus. Subgenus Cerastes was not properly typified nor formally recognized until 2016. Despite the taxonomic difficulties, both clades are generally regarded as being deeply divergent and distinct based on phylogenetic research and morphological characteristics.

The Californian species of Ceanothus are commonly known collectively as California lilacs, with individual species having more descriptive common names. Species native elsewhere have other common names such as New Jersey tea for C. americanus, as its leaves were used as a black tea substitute during the American Revolution. In garden use, most are simply called by their scientific names or an adaptation of the scientific name, such as 'Maritime ceanothus' for C. maritimus.

=== Species ===
The following species list is based on the treatments in the Flora of North America Volume 12 (2016) and A Taxonomic Conspectus of Ceanothus subgenus Cerastes (Rhamnaceae) by Burge et al. (2016). Supplementary names are provided by Plants of the World Online and The Plant List.

==== Subgenus Ceanothus ====
Ceanothus subg. Ceanothus

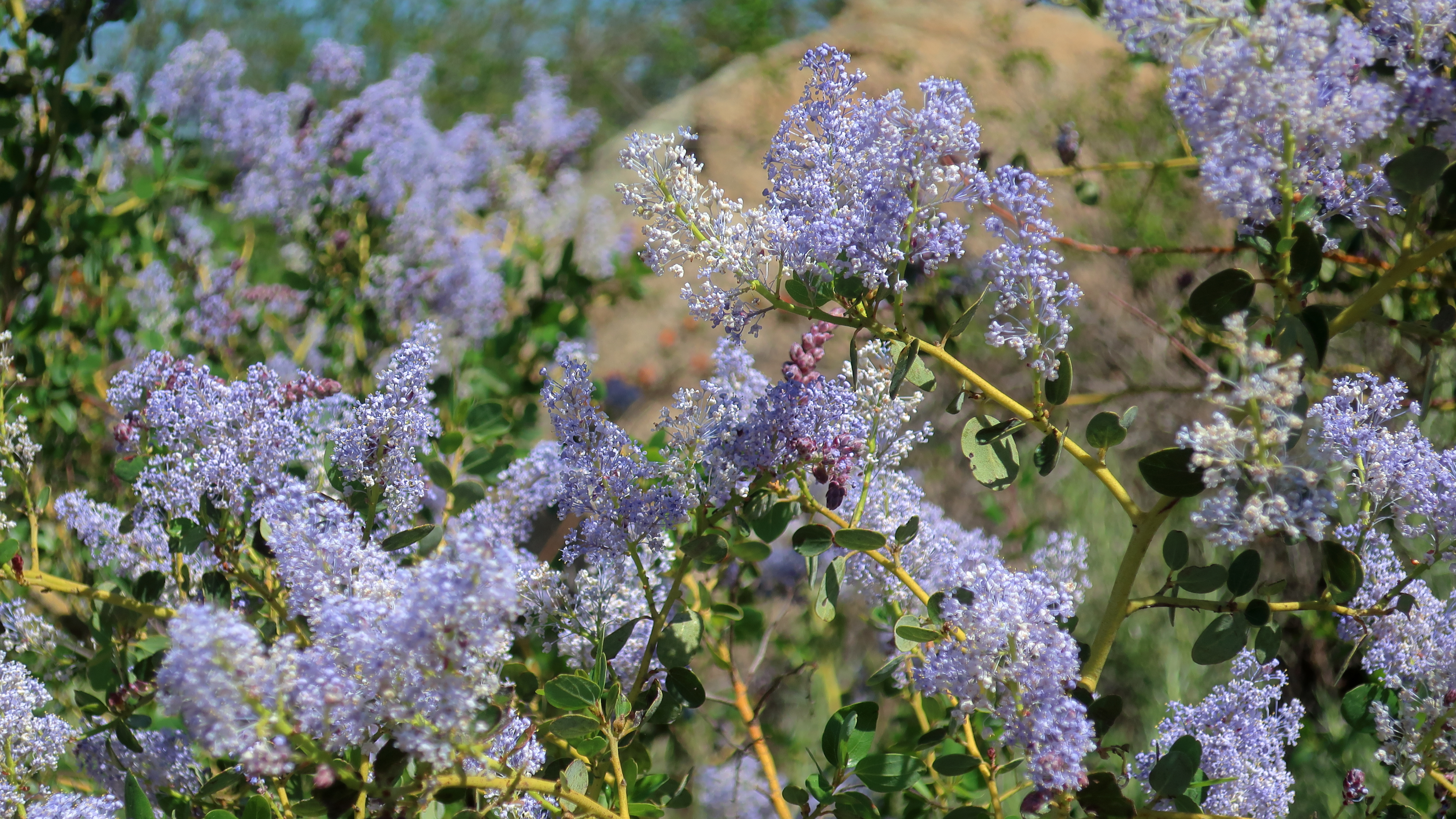
Ceanothus pendletonensis with flowering inflorescences

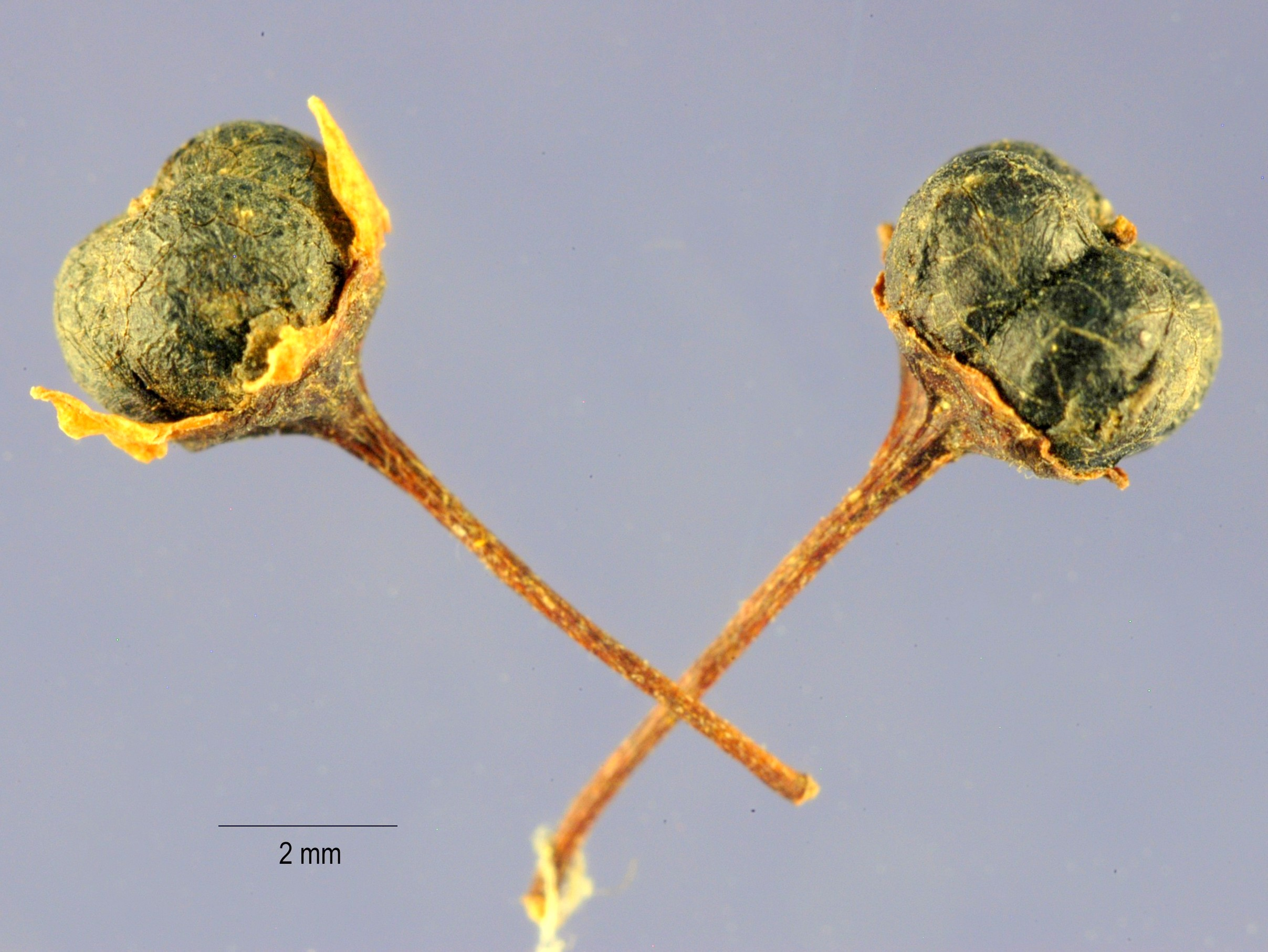
The fruits of Ceanothus thyrsiflorus

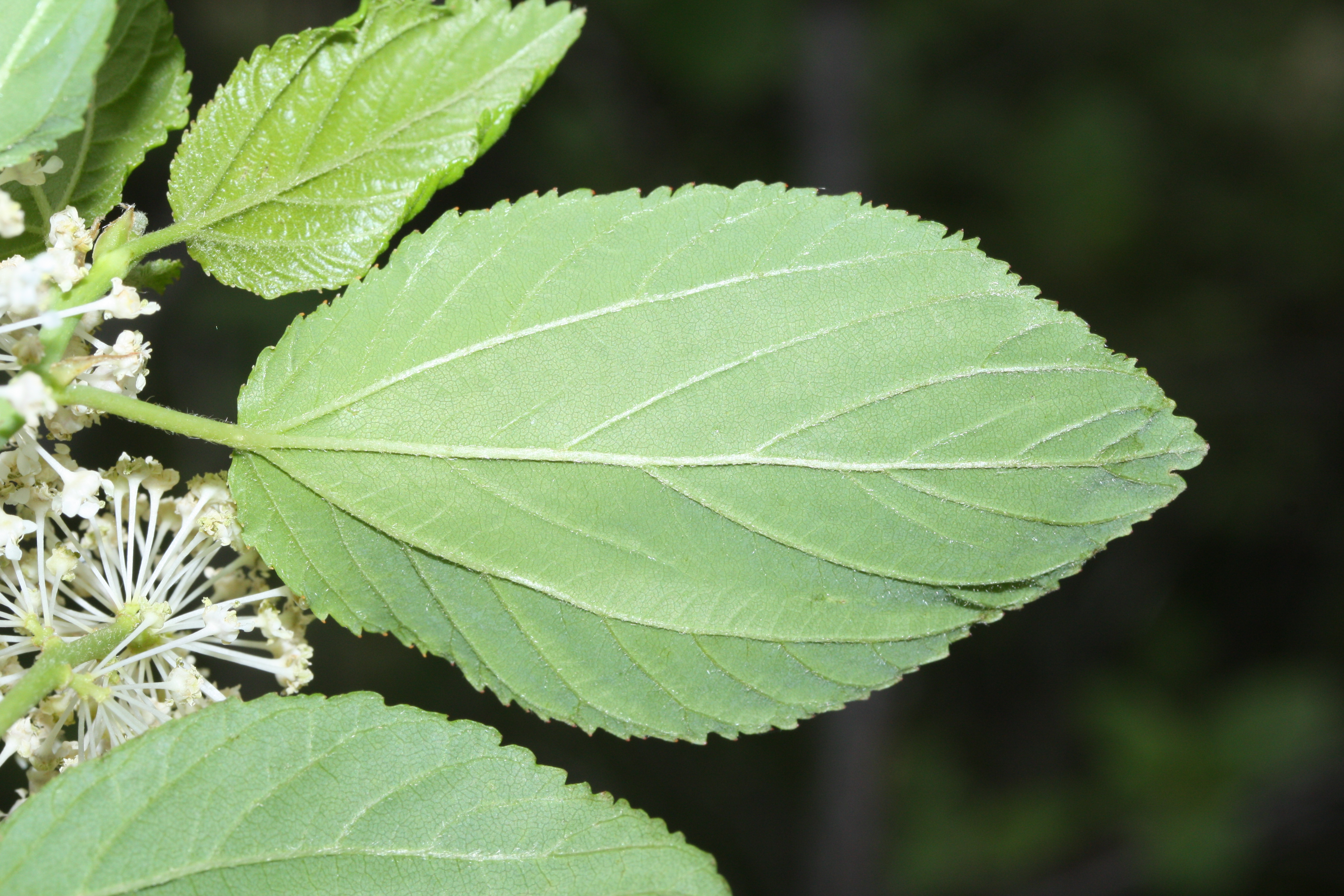
The leaves (underside) of Ceanothus sanguineus

Ceanothus subgenus Ceanothus consists of evergreen or deciduous species with thin scale-like stipules, alternate leaves, branchlets that may be thorn-tipped, and inflorescences that are generally raceme-like to panicle-like, or occasionally umbel-like. The capsules lack horns, and are sometimes crested. Depending on the authority, there are about 21 to 32 species recognized in subgenus Ceanothus. This subgenus is widely distributed across North America, from Canada, the United States and Mexico to Central America (Costa Rica, Guatemala, Panama). Many species in this subgenus have burls (root crowns) that can withstand wildfires, allowing them to respond to fire by resprouting.

- Ceanothus americanus L. – New Jersey tea; red root
- Ceanothus arboreus Greene – feltleaf ceanothus
- Ceanothus buxifolius Willd. ex Schult. & Schult.f.
- Ceanothus caeruleus Lag
- Ceanothus cordulatus Kellogg – whitethorn ceanothus
- Ceanothus cyaneus Eastw. – San Diego buckbrush
- Ceanothus dentatus Torr. & A.Gray – sandscrub ceanothus
- Ceanothus depressus Benth. – junco
- Ceanothus diversifolius Kellogg – pinemat
- Ceanothus fendleri A.Gray – Fendler's ceanothus
- Ceanothus fernandezii Villarreal, A.E.Estrada & Encina
- Ceanothus foliosus Parry – wavyleaf ceanothus
  - subsp. foliosus Parry
  - subsp. medius (McMinn) C.L.Schmidt
  - subsp. vineatus (McMinn) C.L.Schmidt
- Ceanothus griseus (Trel. ex B.L.Rob.) McMinn – Carmel ceanothus
- Ceanothus hearstiorum Hoover & J.B.Roof – Hearst Ranch buckbrush
- Ceanothus herbaceus Raf. – Jersey tea
- Ceanothus impressus Trel. – Santa Barbara ceanothus
- Ceanothus incanus Torr. & A.Gray – coast whitethorn
- Ceanothus integerrimus Hook. & Arn. – deerbrush ceanothus
- Ceanothus lemmonii Parry – Lemmon's ceanothus
- Ceanothus leucodermis Greene – chaparral whitethorn
- Ceanothus martini M.E.Jones – Martin's ceanothus
- Ceanothus microphyllus Michx. – littleleaf buckbrush
- Ceanothus ochraceus Suess.
- Ceanothus oliganthus Nutt. – hairy ceanothus
  - subsp. oliganthus Nutt.
  - subsp. sorediatus (Hook. & Arn.) C.L.Schmidt
- Ceanothus palmeri Trel. – Palmer ceanothus
- Ceanothus papillosus Torr. & A.Gray – wartleaf ceanothus
- Ceanothus parryi Trel. – Parry Ceanothus
- Ceanothus parvifolius (S.Watson) Trel. – littleleaf ceanothus
- Ceanothus pendletonensis D.O.Burge, Rebman, & M.R.Mulligan
- Ceanothus sanguineus Pursh – redstem ceanothus
- Ceanothus spinosus Nutt. – green bark ceanothus
- Ceanothus thyrsiflorus Eschsch. – blueblossom
- Ceanothus tomentosus Parry – woolyleaf ceanothus
- Ceanothus velutinus Dougl. ex Hook. – snowbrush ceanothus
  - subsp. laevigatus (Torr. & A.Gray) Piper & Beattie
  - subsp. velutinus Dougl. ex Hook.

==== Subgenus Cerastes ====
Ceanothus subg. Cerastes

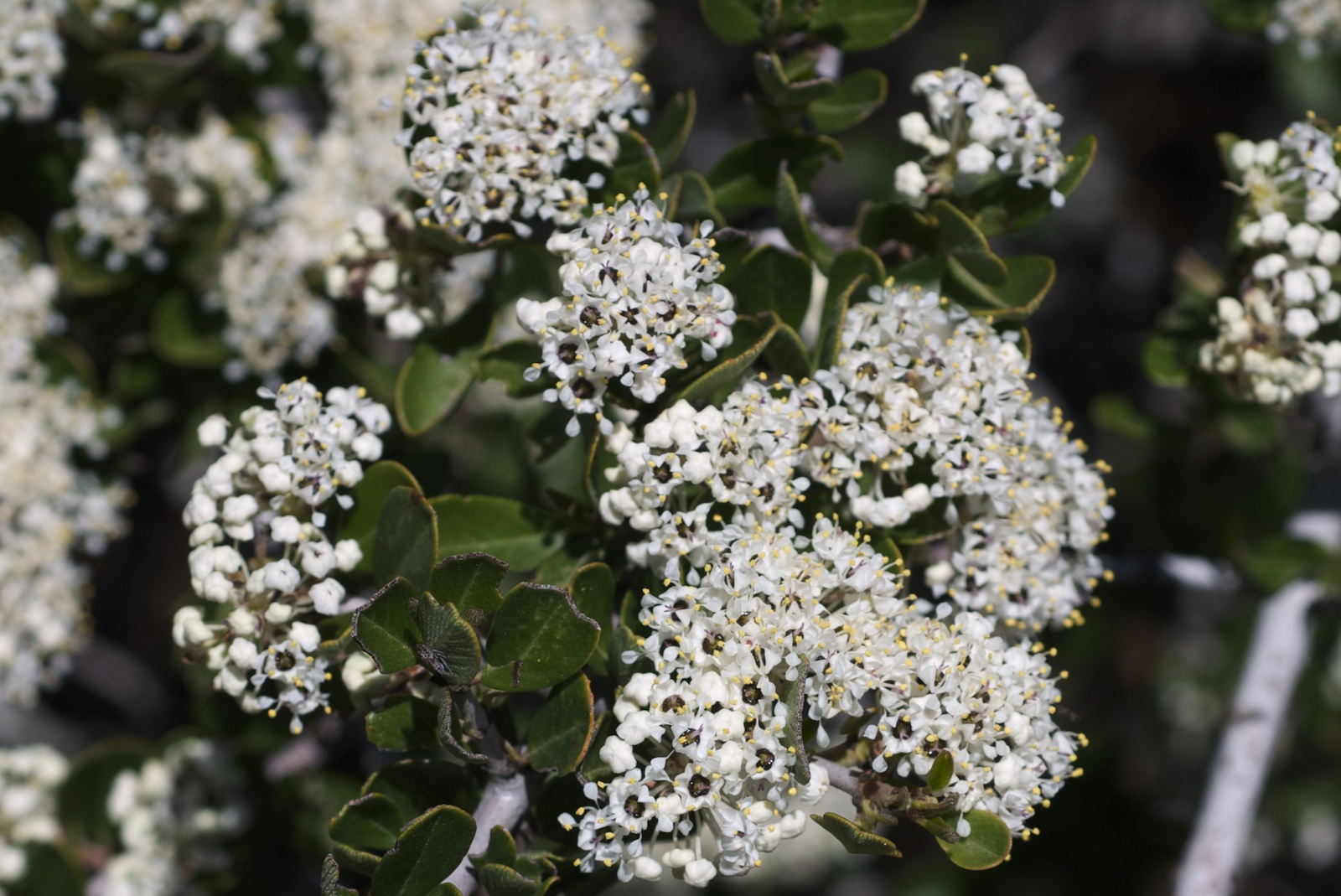
Ceanothus cuneatus with flowering inflorescences

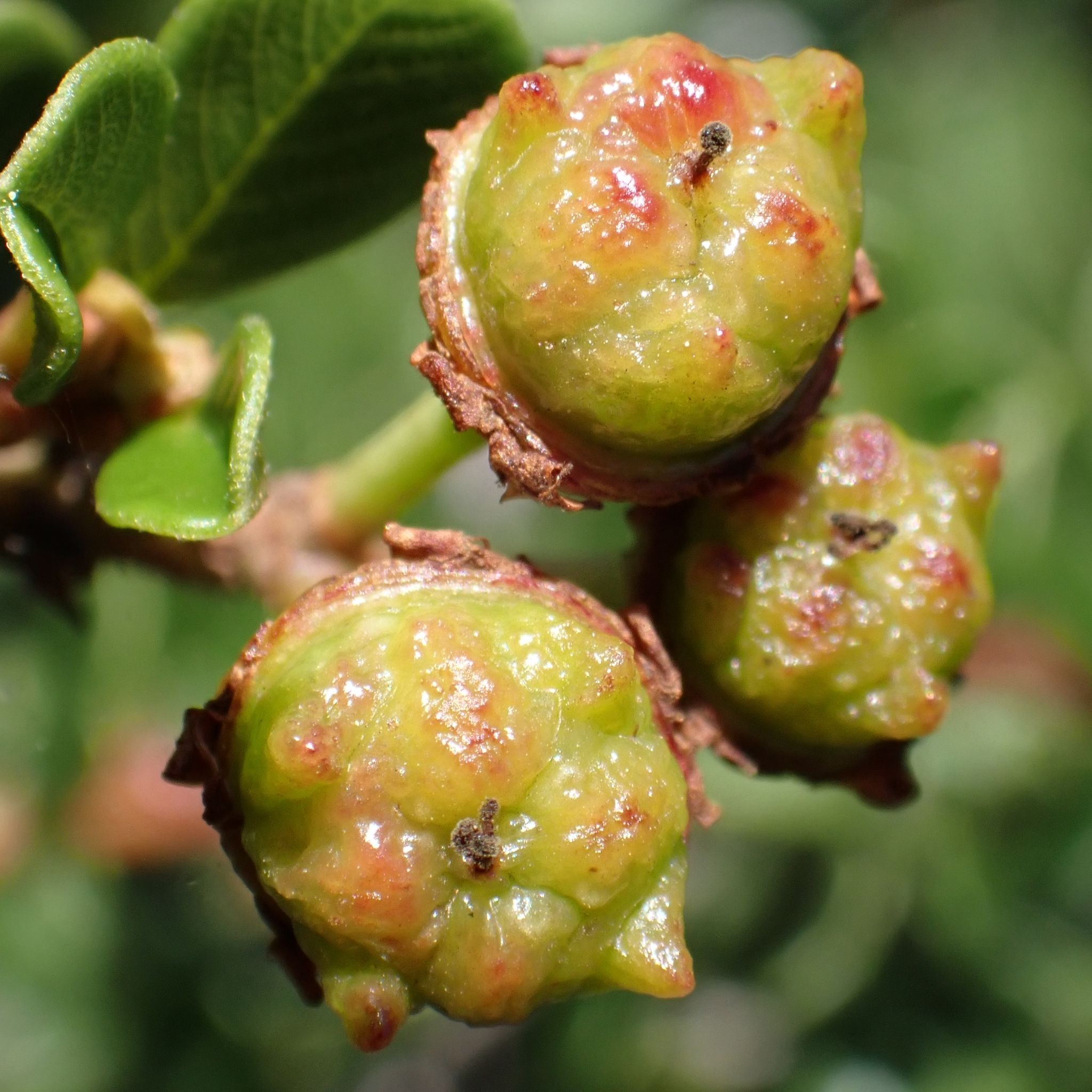
The fruits of Ceanothus megacarpus

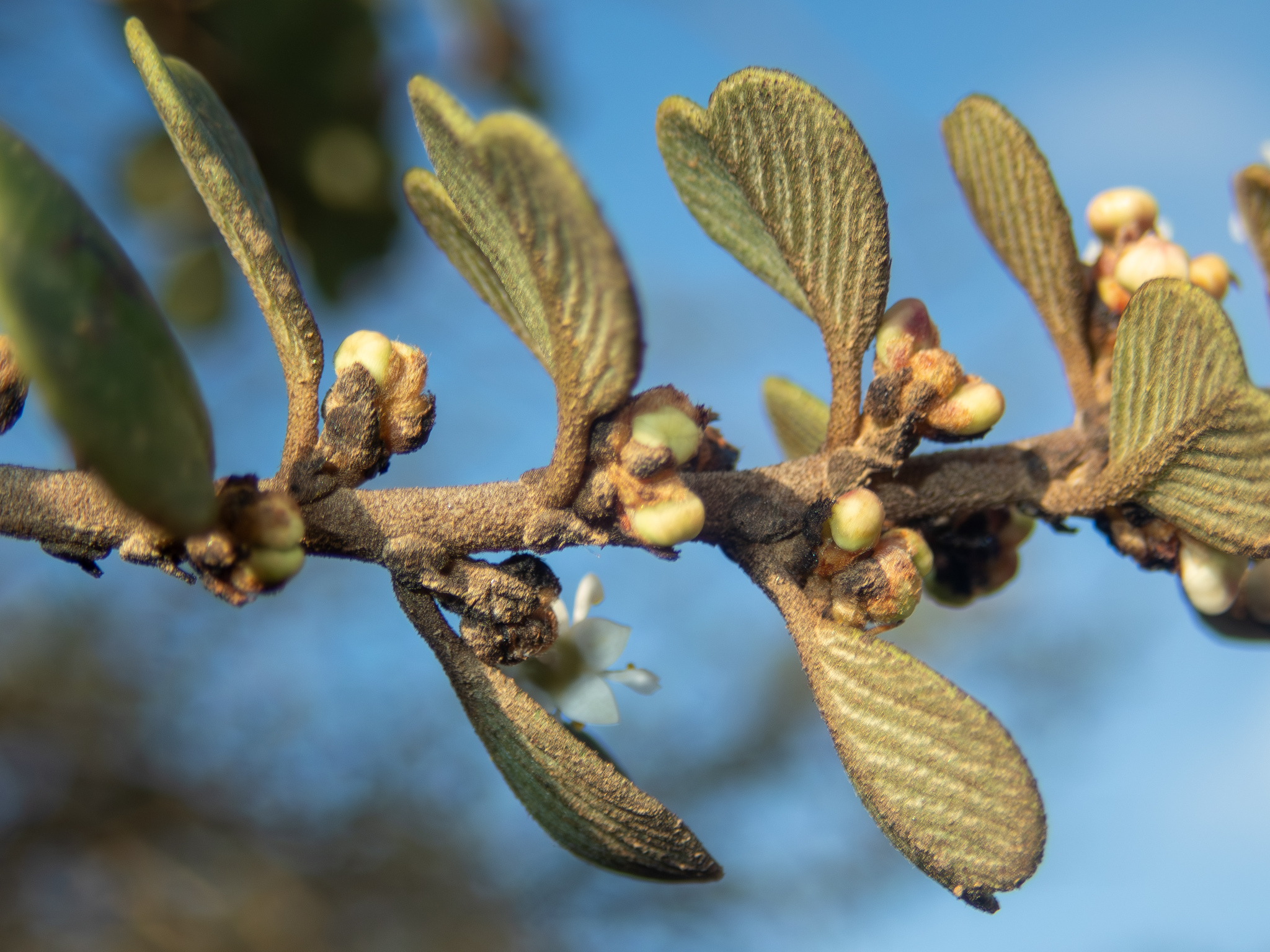
The stem and leaves of Ceanothus verrucosus

Ceanothus subgenus Cerastes (S. Watson) Weberbauer consists of evergreen species with thick, wart-like stipules, branchlets that are not thorn-tipped, and leaves that are usually oppositely arranged (except in C. verrucosus and C. megacarpus var. megacarpus). The leaves of plants in this subgenus are leathery in texture. The inflorescences are generally umbel-like, and rarely raceme-like. The capsules may be horned or not, and are usually not crested (except in C. divergens and C. gloriosus). Depending on the authority, there are about 25 to 29 species recognized in subgenus Cerastes. This subgenus is found in the mountainous western parts of the United States and Mexico, with most species restricted to California. Species in this subgenus strictly reproduce by seeds.

- Ceanothus arcuatus McMinn – arching ceanothus
- Ceanothus bolensis S.Boyd & J.E.Keeley – Cerro Bola ceanothus
- Ceanothus confusus J.T. Howell – Rincon Ridge ceanothus
- Ceanothus × connivens Greene – trailing buckbrush
- Ceanothus crassifolius Torr. – hoaryleaf ceanothus
- Ceanothus cuneatus (Hook.) Nutt. – buckbrush
  - subsp. cuneatus (Hook.) Nutt.
  - subsp. fascicularis (McMinn) C.L.Schmidt
  - subsp. rigidus (Nutt.) C.L.Schmidt
  - subsp. sonomensis (Howell) C.L.Schmidt
- Ceanothus decornutus V.T.Parker – Nicasio ceanothus
- Ceanothus divergens Parry – Calistoga ceanothus
- Ceanothus ferrisiae McMinn – coyote ceanothus
- Ceanothus fresnensis Dudley ex Abrams – Fresno ceanothus
- Ceanothus gloriosus J.T. Howell – Point Reyes ceanothus
  - subsp. exaltatus (Howell) C.L.Schmidt
  - subsp. gloriosus J.T. Howell
  - subsp. masonii (McMinn) C.L.Schmidt
  - subsp. porrectus (Howell) C.L.Schmidt
- Ceanothus jepsonii Greene – Jepson ceanothus
  - subsp. albiflorus (Howell) C.L.Schmidt
  - subsp. jepsonii Greene
- Ceanothus maritimus Hoover – maritime ceanothus
- Ceanothus masonii McMinn – Mason's ceanothus
- Ceanothus megacarpus Nutt. – bigpod ceanothus
  - subsp. insularis (Eastw.) P.H.Raven
  - subsp. megacarpus Nutt.
- Ceanothus ophiochilus Boyd, Ross & Arnseth – Vail Lake ceanothus
- Ceanothus otayensis H. E. McMinn – Otay Mountain buckbrush
- Ceanothus pauciflorus Moc. & Sessé ex DC. – Mojave ceanothus
- Ceanothus perplexans Trel. – cup-leaved ceanothus
- Ceanothus pinetorum Coville – Coville ceanothus
- Ceanothus prostratus Benth. – prostrate ceanothus
  - subsp. confusus (Howell) C.L.Schmidt
  - subsp. prostratus Benth.
  - subsp. pumilus (Greene) C.L.Schmidt
- Ceanothus pumilus Greene – dwarf ceanothus
- Ceanothus purpureus Jepson – hollyleaf ceanothus
  - subsp. divergens (Parry) C.L.Schmidt
  - subsp. purpureus Jepson
- Ceanothus roderickii Knight – Pine Hill buckbrush
- Ceanothus sonomensis J.T. Howell – Sonoma ceanothus
- Ceanothus verrucosus Nutt. – wart-stem ceanothus

=== Hybrids ===
Ceanothus have few natural barriers to genetic exchange, as they share a common diploid chromosome number and lack strong isolating mechanisms, resulting in a number of hybrids and integradation between species. Hybridization usually only occurs within subgenera, as crosses across subgenera produce sterile progeny. The role of hybridization creates difficulties in reliably circumscribing Ceanothus species, and many species were formerly recognized as hybrids, like Ceanothus otayensis and Ceanothus arcuatus. Some authorities do not recognize even named hybrids due to the difficulty of keying them out. There are at least 44 interspecific combinations reported in the literature. The following hybrids have been described:

- Ceanothus × lobbianus Hook.
- Ceanothus × lorenzenii (Jeps.) McMinn
- Ceanothus × mendocinensis McMinn
- Ceanothus × rugosus Greene
- Ceanothus × serrulatus McMinn
- Ceanothus × vanrensselaeri Roof
- Ceanothus × veitchianus Hook.

The status of the following hybrids is unresolved:

- Ceanothus × arnoldii Dippel
- Ceanothus × bakeri Greene ex McMinn
- Ceanothus × burkwoodii auct.
- Ceanothus × burtonensis Renss.
- Ceanothus × cyam L.W.Lenz
- Ceanothus × delilianus Spach
- Ceanothus × flexilis McMinn
- Ceanothus × humboldtensis Roof
- Ceanothus × intermedius Koehne
- Ceanothus × pallidus Koehne
- Ceanothus × pallidus Lindl.
- Ceanothus × roseus Koehne

== Distribution ==
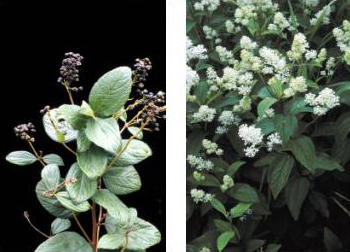
Ceanothus americanus (fruit left, flowers right)

Plants in this genus are widely distributed and can be found on dry, sunny hillsides from coastal scrub lands to open forest clearings, from near sea level to 9,000 feet (2,700 m) in elevation. These plants are profusely distributed throughout the Rocky Mountains from British Columbia south through Colorado, the Cascades of Oregon and California, and the Coastal Ranges of California.

Ceanothus velutinus is perhaps the most widespread member of this genus, occurring through much of western North America. The plants in this genus often co-occur with one another, especially when they are more distantly related.

== Uses ==
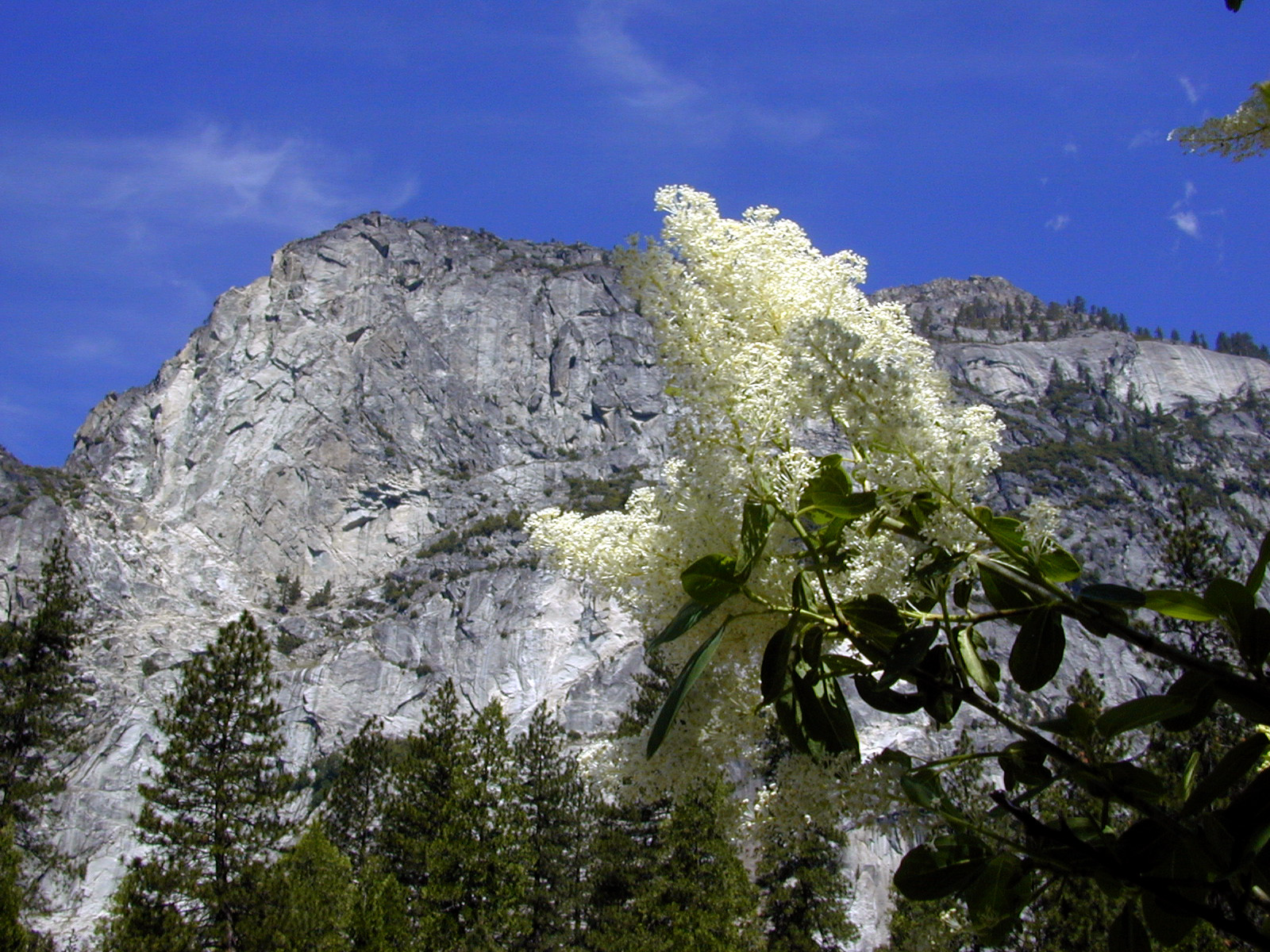
Ceanothus integerrimus (deerbrush) in Yosemite National Park

=== Wildlife ===
Ceanothus is a good source of nutrition for deer, specifically mule deer along the West Coast of the United States. However, the leaves are not as nutritious from late spring to early fall as they are in early spring. Porcupines and quail have also been seen eating stems and seeds of these shrubs. The leaves are a good source of protein and the stems and leaves have been found to contain a high amount of calcium.

=== Cultivation ===
Many Ceanothus species are popular ornamental plants for gardens. The ease of hybridization in Ceanothus makes them attractive plants for horticultural cultivars. One of the first and most popular cultivars was 'Gloire de Versailles' (Ceanothus × delilianus), a cross of the eastern North American species C. americanus and the Mexican species C. caeruleus, which was created in France in the 1830s. There are over 200 named selections of Ceanothus.

=== Royal Horticultural Society's Award of Garden Merit cultivars ===
The following cultivars and hybrids have gained the Royal Horticultural Society's Award of Garden Merit (as of 2017):

- ’Autumnal Blue’
- 'Blue Mound'
- 'Burkwoodii'
- 'Cascade'
- 'Concha'
- 'Dark Star'
- 'Gloire de Versailles'
- 'Mystery Blue'
- 'Perle Rose'
- 'Puget Blue'
- 'Skylark'
- 'Topaze'
- 'Trewithen Blue'
- C. thyrsifolius var. repens

Other cultivars available include:-

- 'Anchor Bay'
- 'Diamond Heights' (variegated leaves)
- 'Ray Hartman'
- 'Snow Flurry'

There are also more cultivars and hybrids of Ceanothus arboreus, Ceanothus griseus horizontalis (groundcovers), and Ceanothus thyrsiflorus in the nursery trade.

==== Propagation ====
Propagation of ceanothus is by seed, following scarification and stratification. Seeds are soaked in water for 12 hours followed by chilling at 1 °C for one to three months. It can also sprout from roots and/or stems. Seeds are stored in plant litter in large quantities. It is estimated that there are about two million seeds per acre in forest habitats. Seeds are dispersed propulsively from capsules and, it has been estimated, can remain viable for hundreds of years. In habitat, the seeds of plants in this genus germinate only in response to range fires and forest fires.

=== Other uses ===
Native Americans used the dried leaves of this plant as an herbal tea, and early pioneers used the plant as a substitute for black tea. Miwok Indians of California make baskets from Ceanothus branches. Ceanothus integerrimus has been used by North American tribes to ease childbirth.

== Nitrogen fixation ==
Ceanothus is actinorhizal, meaning it fixes nitrogen through a symbiotic relationship with Frankia. Six genera within Rhamnaceae are actinorhizal, but Ceanothus is the only genus not in the monophyletic tribe Colletieae. This suggests that actinorhizal symbiosis may have evolved twice in Rhamnaceae. Frankia forms nodules on the roots of Ceanothus, converting atmospheric nitrogen (N_{2}) into ammonia (NH_{3}) using nitrogenase.
