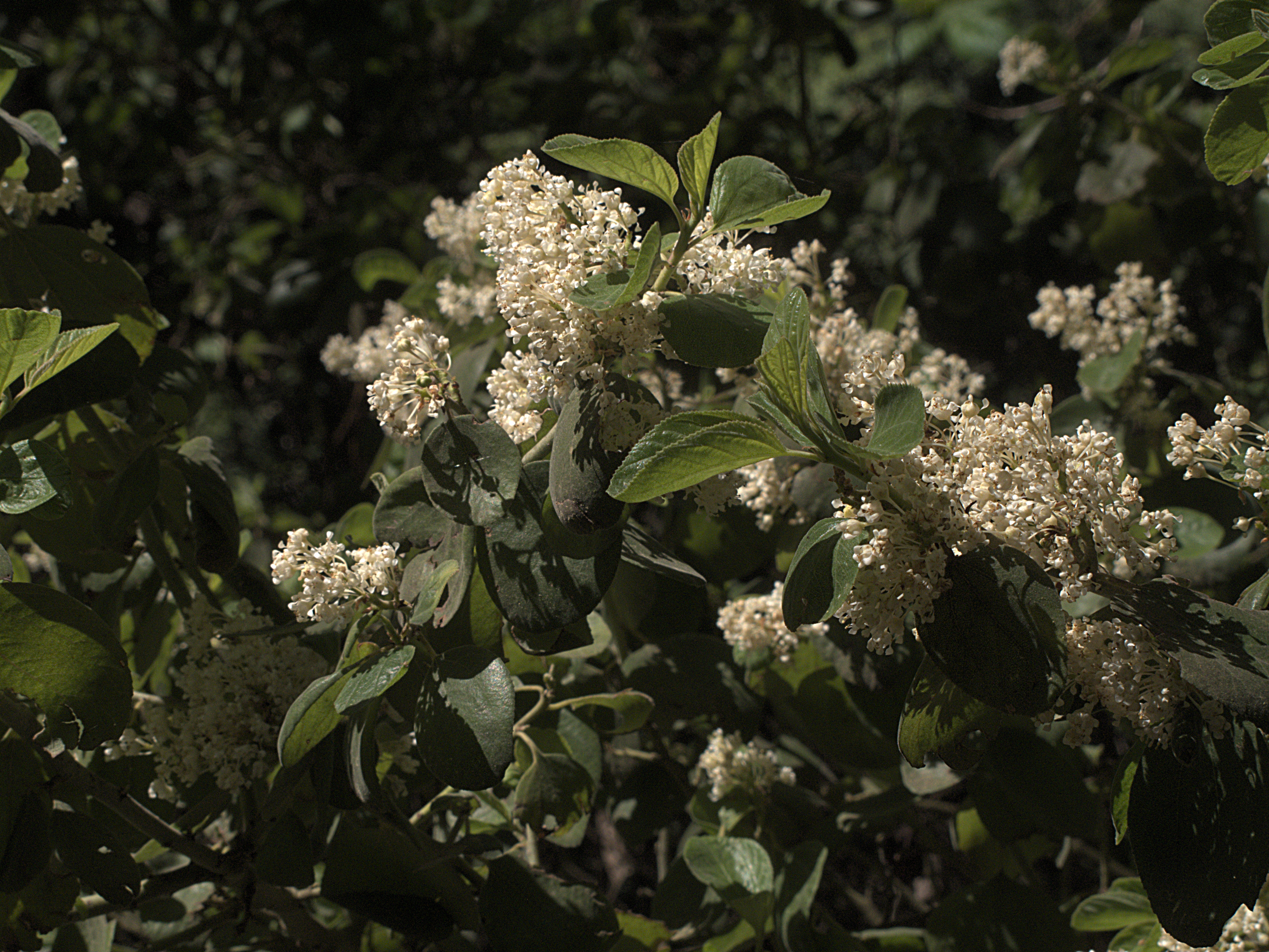

Conservation status
- Vulnerable (NatureServe)

Scientific classification
- Kingdom: Plantae
- Clade: Tracheophytes
- Clade: Angiosperms
- Clade: Eudicots
- Clade: Rosids
- Order: Rosales
- Family: Rhamnaceae
- Genus: Ceanothus
- Species: C. incanus

Binomial name
- Ceanothus incanus Torr. & A.Gray

= Ceanothus incanus =

Species of flowering plant

Ceanothus incanus is a species of shrub in the family Rhamnaceae known by the common name coast whitethorn. It is endemic to California, where it is known from the San Francisco Bay Area through the North Coast Ranges into the Klamath Mountains.

== Description ==
This thorny shrub grows erect to approach a maximum height of 4 meters. The woody parts are gray in color and waxy and somewhat hairy in texture. The evergreen leaves are alternately arranged. They are generally oval in shape and usually smooth along the edges, but sometimes minutely toothed. The inflorescence is a panicle-like cluster of white flowers up to about 7 centimeters long. The fruit is a rough, lobed capsule about half a centimeter long containing three seeds.
