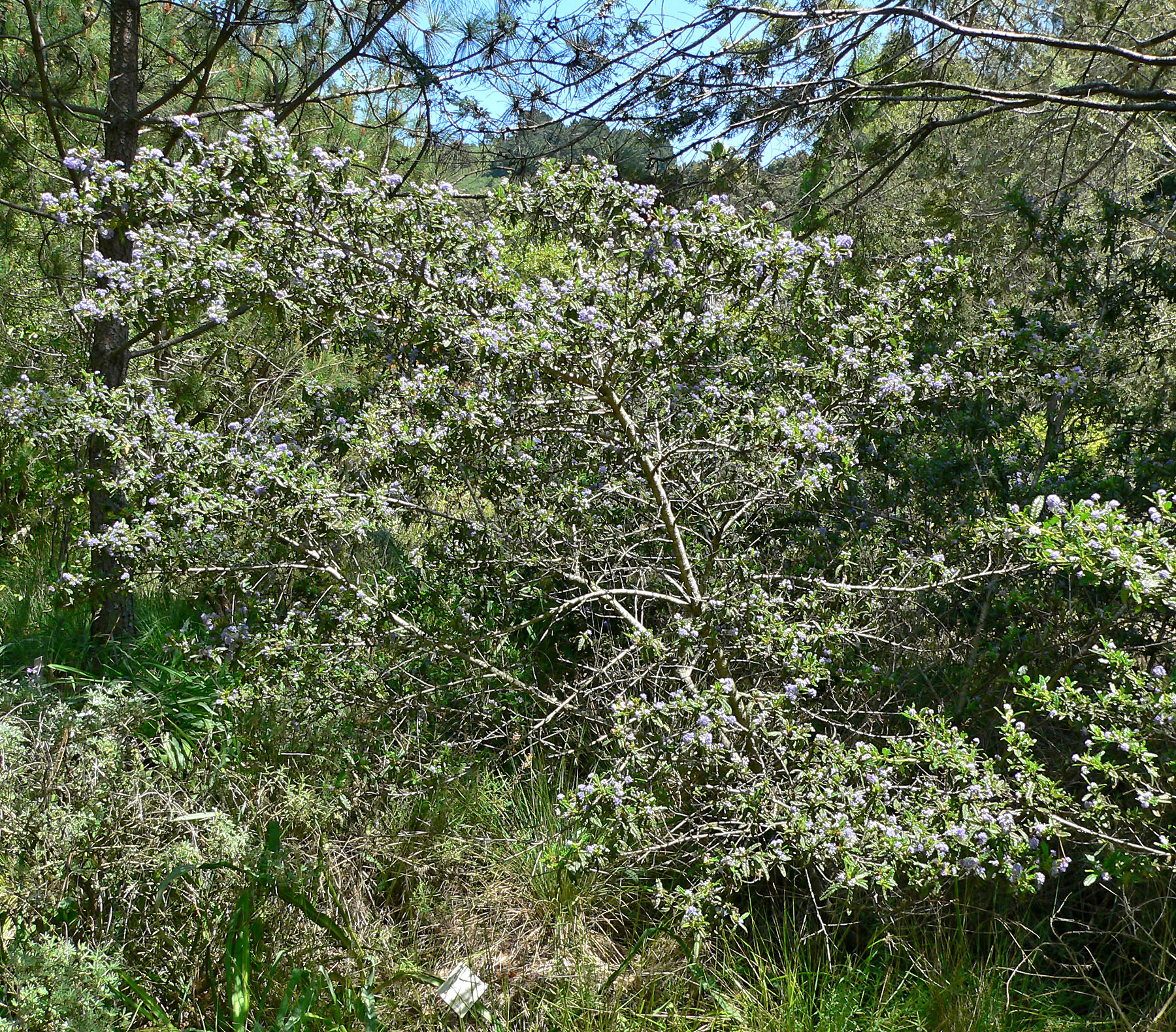

Conservation status
- Vulnerable (NatureServe)

Scientific classification
- Kingdom: Plantae
- Clade: Tracheophytes
- Clade: Angiosperms
- Clade: Eudicots
- Clade: Rosids
- Order: Rosales
- Family: Rhamnaceae
- Genus: Ceanothus
- Species: C. papillosus

Binomial name
- Ceanothus papillosus Torr. & A.Gray

= Ceanothus papillosus =

Species of flowering plant

Ceanothus papillosus, the wartleaf ceanothus, is a species of plant in the genus Ceanothus. It is endemic to California, where it grows in open habitat on the slopes of the coastal mountain ranges, such as woodland and chaparral.

== Description ==
The evergreen leaves are alternately arranged, often in crowded clusters, each oblong to long-rectangular in shape and covered in glandular bumps. The edges are generally turned under and lined with glandular hairs. The inflorescence is a cluster of bright blue flowers. The fruit is a bumpy capsule about 3 millimeters long.

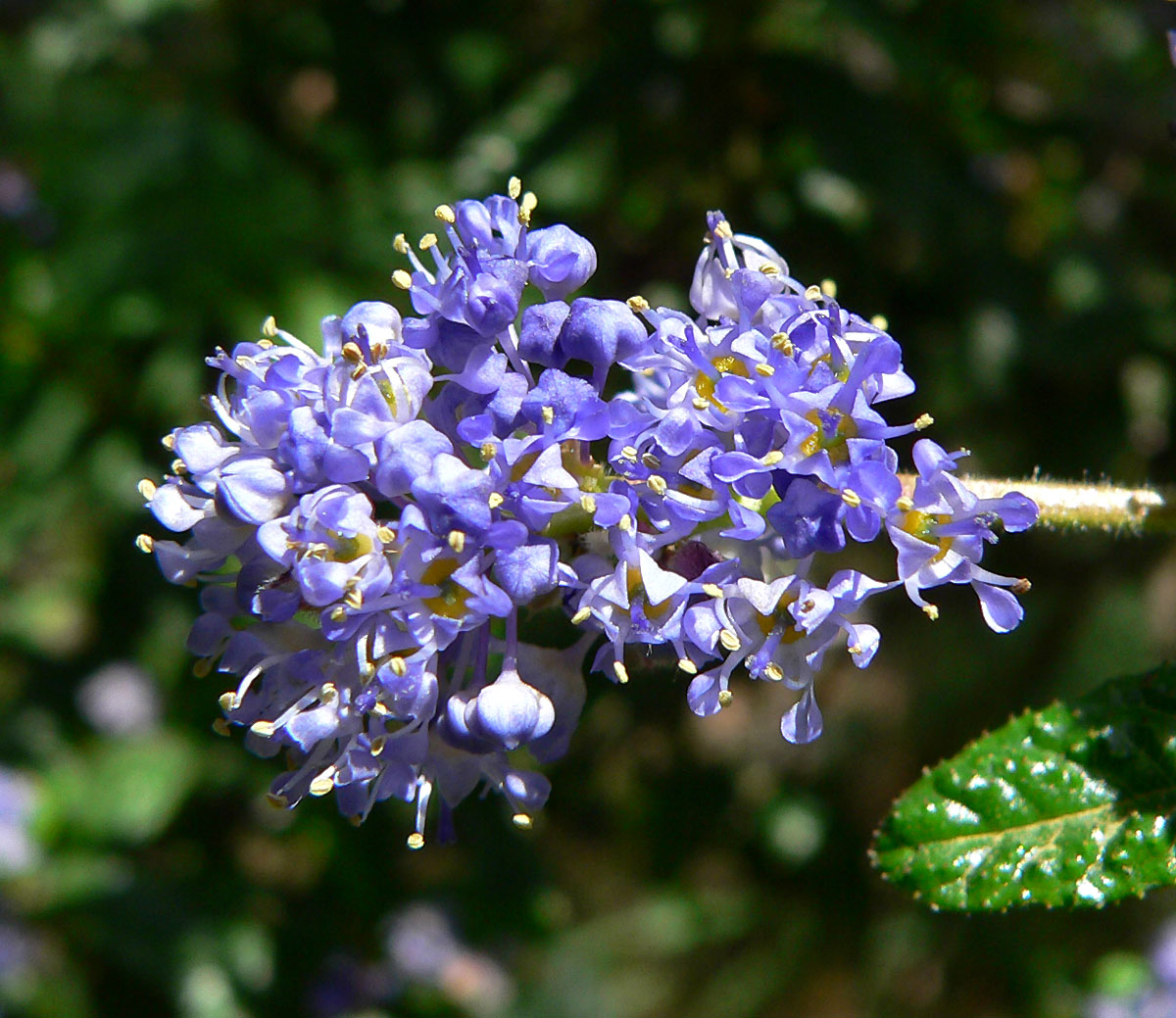
Flowers

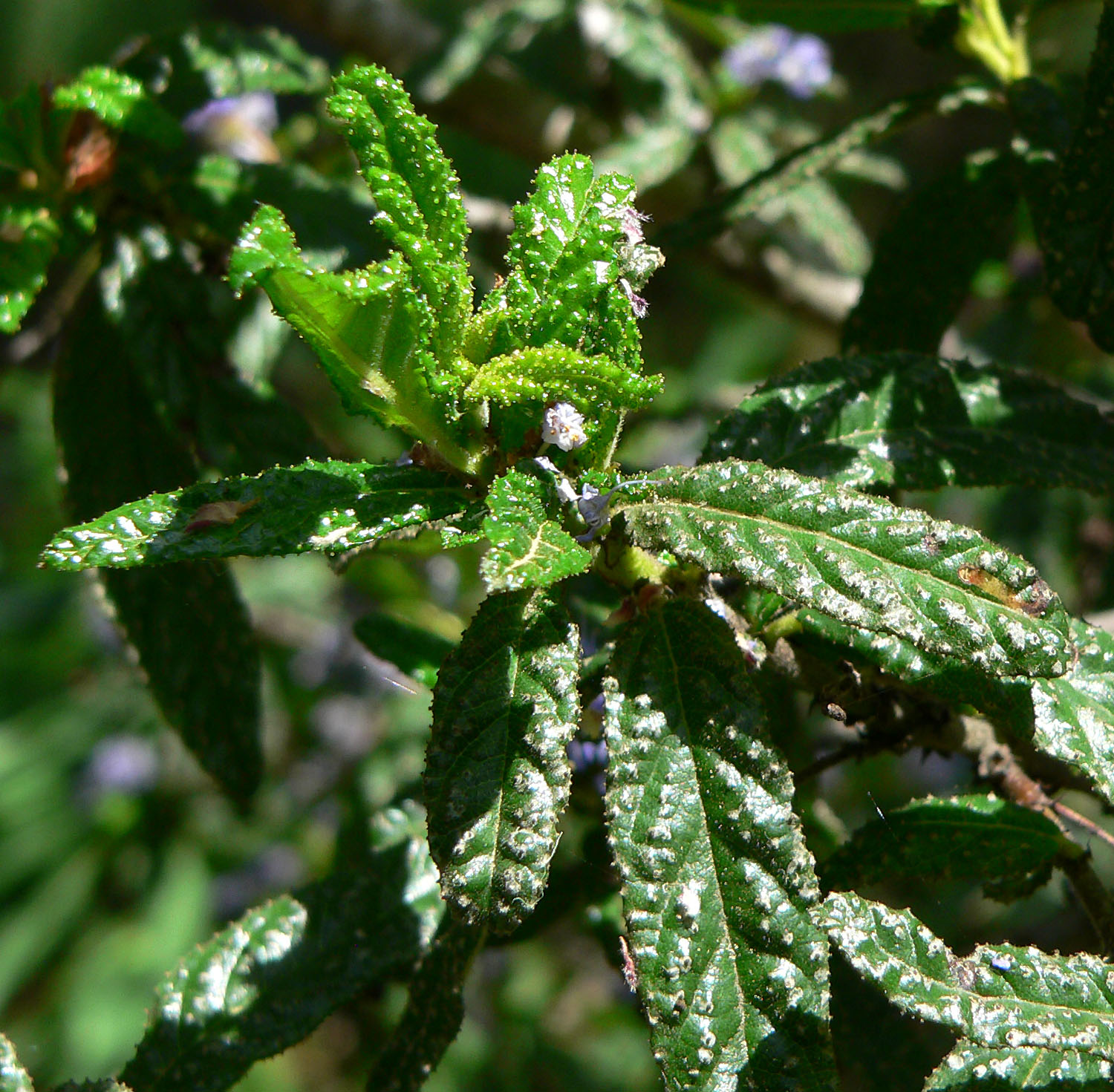
Leaves
