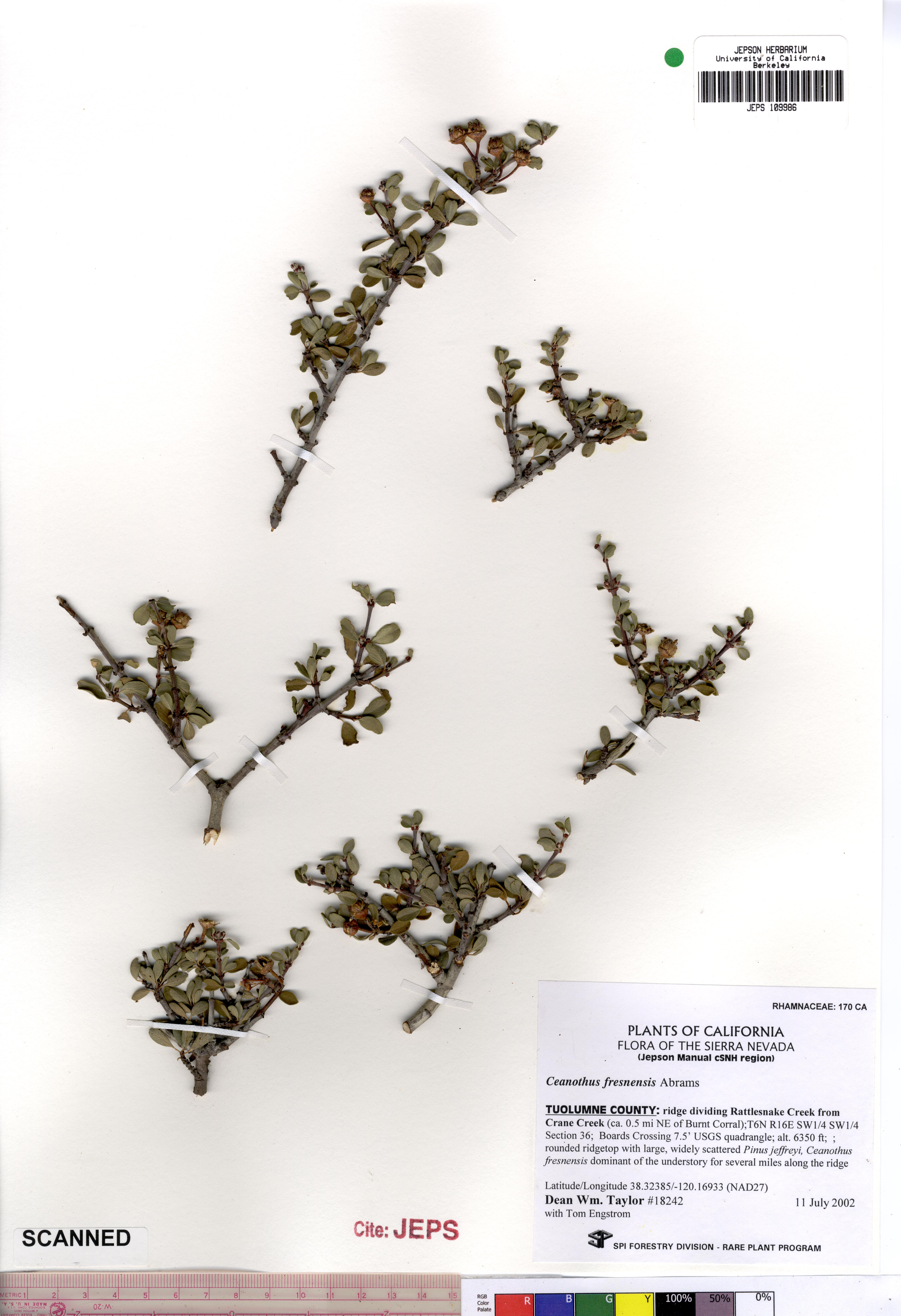

Scientific classification
- Kingdom: Plantae
- Clade: Tracheophytes
- Clade: Angiosperms
- Clade: Eudicots
- Clade: Rosids
- Order: Rosales
- Family: Rhamnaceae
- Genus: Ceanothus
- Species: C. fresnensis

Binomial name
- Ceanothus fresnensis Dudley ex Abrams

= Ceanothus fresnensis =

Species of flowering plant

Ceanothus fresnensis is a species of shrub in the family Rhamnaceae known by the common name Fresno mat. It is endemic to California, where it grows in central sections of the Sierra Nevada and its foothills. Its habitat includes dry woodland and coniferous forest.

== Description ==
This is a flat, spreading shrub forming mats approaching 6 meters in maximum width. The stems are reddish brown and send down roots at nodes. The evergreen leaves are oppositely arranged and generally under 2 centimeters long. They are oval and have smooth edges but sometimes have a few teeth or notches at the tips. The inflorescence is a small cluster of pale to bright blue flowers. The fruit is a horned capsule about half a centimeter long.
