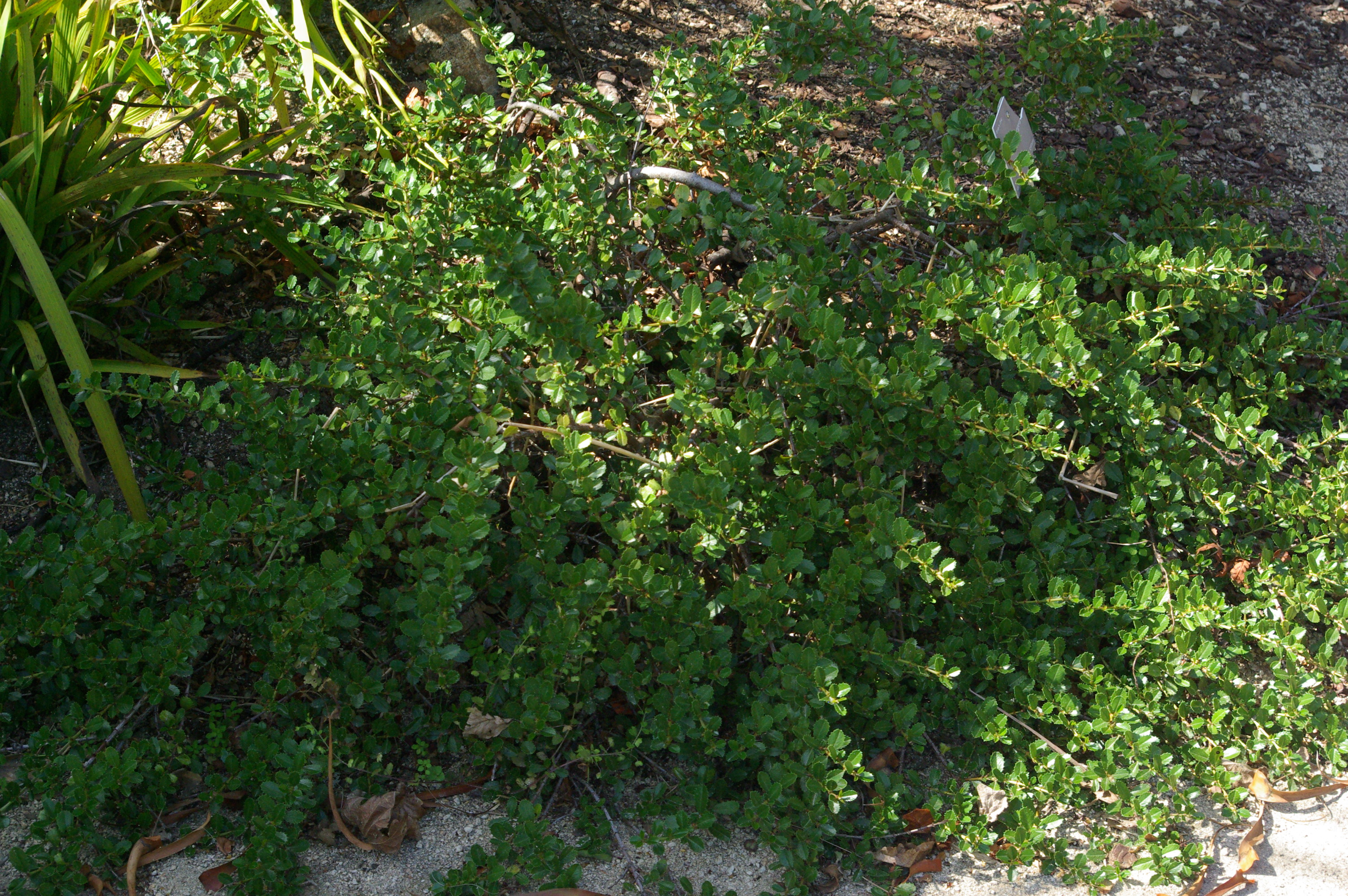

Conservation status
- Imperiled (NatureServe)

Scientific classification
- Kingdom: Plantae
- Clade: Tracheophytes
- Clade: Angiosperms
- Clade: Eudicots
- Clade: Rosids
- Order: Rosales
- Family: Rhamnaceae
- Genus: Ceanothus
- Species: C. divergens

Binomial name
- Ceanothus divergens Parry

= Ceanothus divergens =

Species of shrub

Ceanothus divergens, commonly known as Calistoga ceanothus, is an evergreen shrub in the family Rhamnaceae, an endemic of California.

== Description ==
This plant has a growth habit described as ascending to erect and may attain height. The plant's preferred habitat is on shrub-covered, rocky, volcanic slopes. The hermaphrodite blue or purple flowers bloom in April and May.

The sub-globose fruits are five to six millimeters in diameter.

== Distribution ==
Occurrence is primarily in the Northern California Coast Ranges, such as near Calistoga, at altitudes of less than 500 meters.
