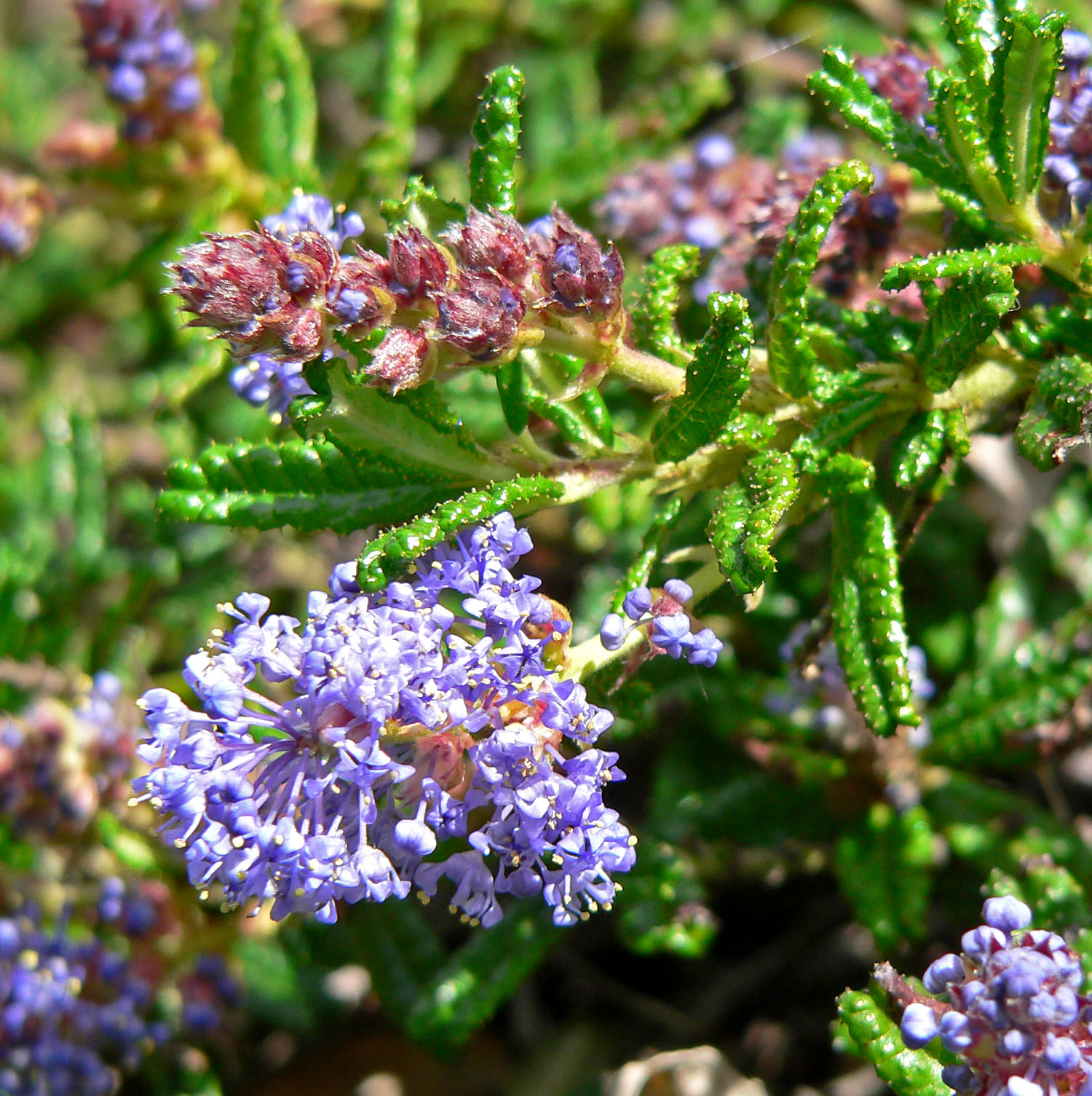

Conservation status
- Imperiled (NatureServe)

Scientific classification
- Kingdom: Plantae
- Clade: Tracheophytes
- Clade: Angiosperms
- Clade: Eudicots
- Clade: Rosids
- Order: Rosales
- Family: Rhamnaceae
- Genus: Ceanothus
- Species: C. hearstiorum

Binomial name
- Ceanothus hearstiorum Hoover & J.B.Roof

= Ceanothus hearstiorum =

Species of flowering plant

Ceanothus hearstiorum is a species of flowering shrub known by the common names Hearst Ranch buckbrush and Hearst's ceanothus. This Ceanothus is endemic to California, where it grows wild only on the hilly coastline of San Luis Obispo County.

== Description ==
This shrub is generally wider than it is tall and often lies prostrate in a mat on the ground. The younger branches are hairy and somewhat feltlike in texture. The distinctive evergreen leaves are oval to almost rectangular and have a cupped, rippled surface. The edges are toothed with tiny glandular knobs and the shiny surface may be dotted with more knobs. The underside of the leaf is fuzzy to hairy. The inflorescences are borne on short, stout stalks and the tiny flowers are lavender to blue with prominent yellow-anthered blue stamens.

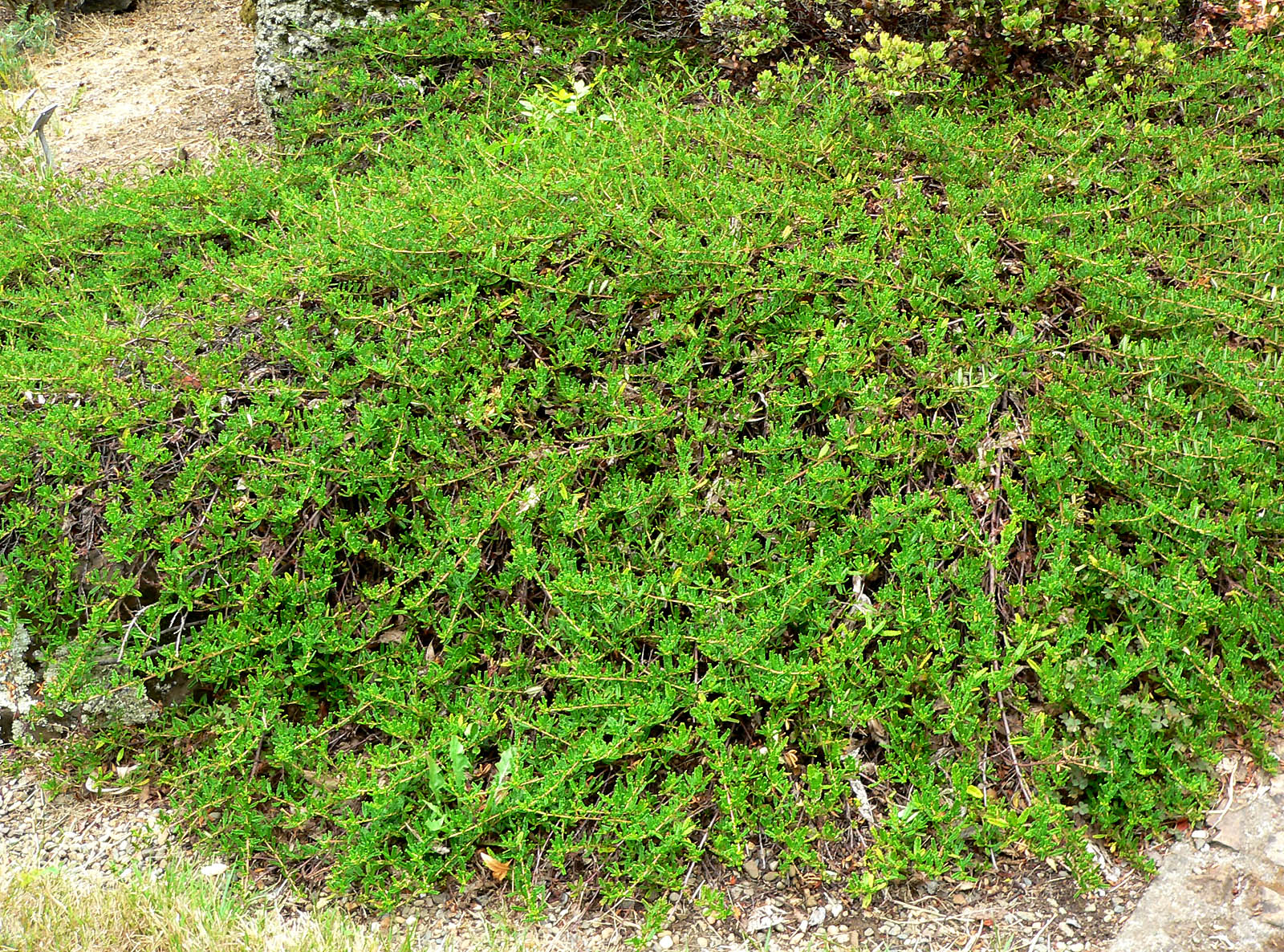
Ceanothus hearstiorum
