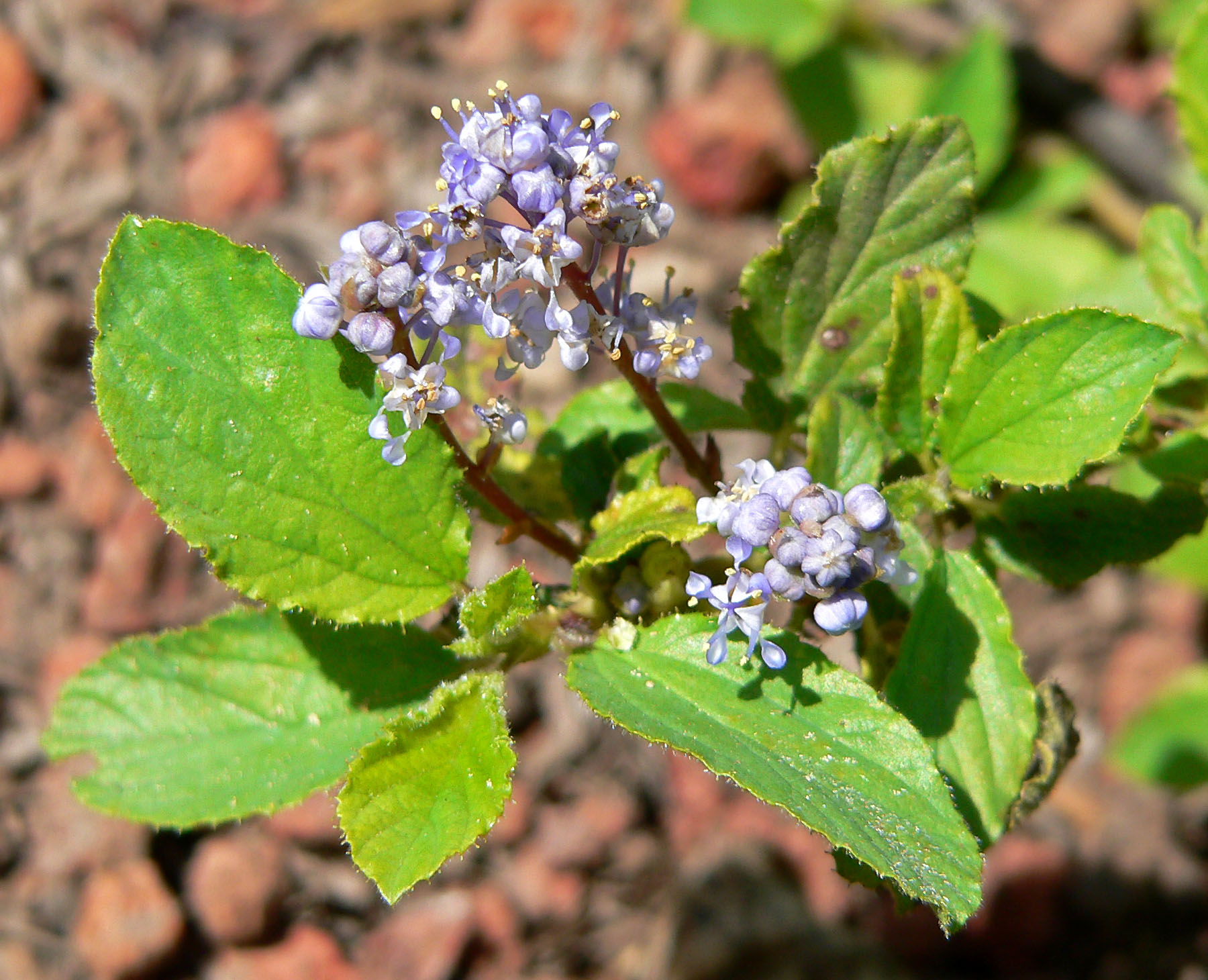

Conservation status
- Vulnerable (NatureServe)

Scientific classification
- Kingdom: Plantae
- Clade: Tracheophytes
- Clade: Angiosperms
- Clade: Eudicots
- Clade: Rosids
- Order: Rosales
- Family: Rhamnaceae
- Genus: Ceanothus
- Species: C. diversifolius

Binomial name
- Ceanothus diversifolius Kellogg

= Ceanothus diversifolius =

Species of flowering plant

Ceanothus diversifolius is a species of flowering shrub known by the common name pinemat. This Ceanothus is endemic to California, where it can be found in the oak and pine forests of several mountain ranges.

== Description ==
This is a sprawling shrub growing flat across the ground in mats rarely exceeding 30 centimeters in height. Its younger branches are hairy, turning from yellow-green to reddish. The round to oval evergreen leaves are up to 5 centimeters long and have finely serrated edges with a fringe of sparse glandular hairs.

The short inflorescences bear bunches of flowers which may be blue to almost white. The fruit is a smooth rounded capsule a few millimeters wide.

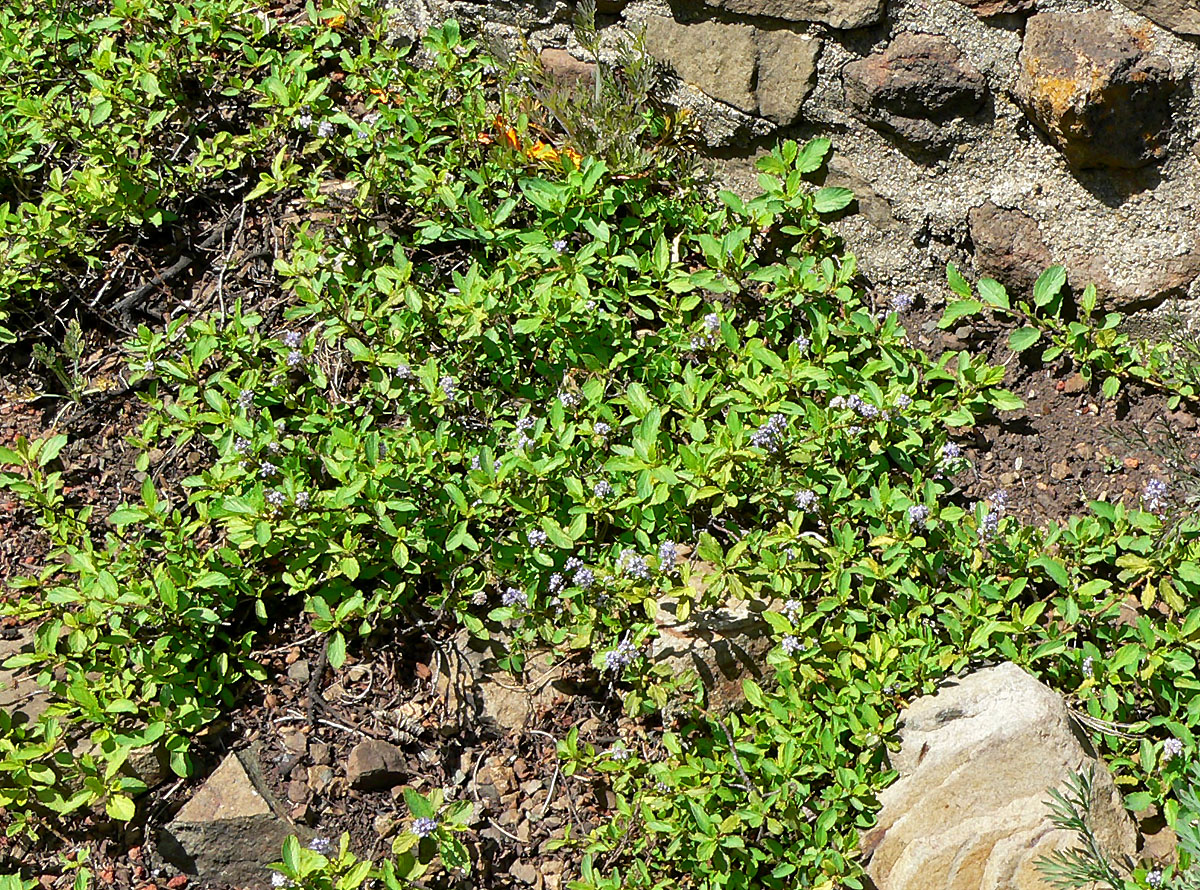
Ceanothus diversifolius
