= Ceanothus caeruleus =

Conservation status
- Least Concern (IUCN 3.1)

Scientific classification
- Kingdom: Plantae
- Clade: Tracheophytes
- Clade: Angiosperms
- Clade: Eudicots
- Clade: Rosids
- Order: Rosales
- Family: Rhamnaceae
- Genus: Ceanothus
- Species: C. caeruleus

Binomial name
- Ceanothus caeruleus Lag.

Synonyms
- Ceanothus axillaris Carrière; Ceanothus azureus Desf. ex Ker Gawl.; Ceanothus bertinii Carrière; Ceanothus bicolor Willd. ex Schult. & Schult.f.; Ceanothus candolleanus Rose; Ceanothus glandulosus Schltdl., nom. illeg. homonym. post.

Species of plant

Ceanothus caeruleus is a species of Ceanothus shrub first described by Mariano Lagasca y Segura. Ceanothus caeruleus is part of the genus Ceanothus and the family Rhamnaceae. It is native to Mexico and Central America. It grows in lowland tropical moist forest.
