= Ceanothus buxifolius =

Scientific classification
- Kingdom: Plantae
- Clade: Tracheophytes
- Clade: Angiosperms
- Clade: Eudicots
- Clade: Rosids
- Order: Rosales
- Family: Rhamnaceae
- Genus: Ceanothus
- Species: C. buxifolius

Binomial name
- Ceanothus buxifolius Willd. ex Schult. & Schult.f. (1829)

Synonyms
- Ceanothus ferox Standl. (1923); Colubrina buxifolia (Willd. ex Schult. & Schult.f.) Schltdl. (1841)

Species of flowering plant

Ceanothus buxifolius is a species of flowering plant in the buckthorn family, Rhamnaceae. It is a shrub endemic to Mexico.
