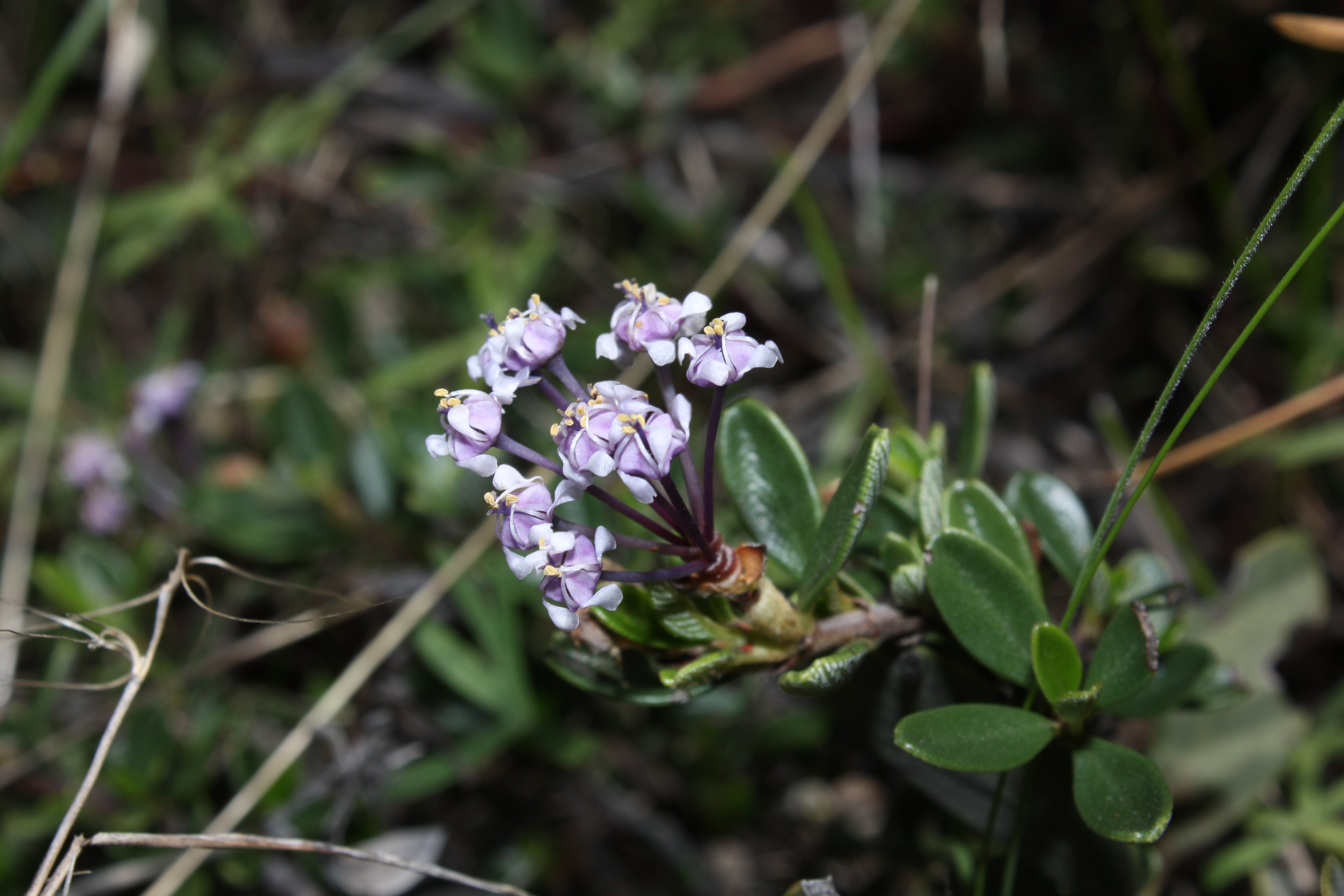

Conservation status
- Vulnerable (NatureServe)

Scientific classification
- Kingdom: Plantae
- Clade: Tracheophytes
- Clade: Angiosperms
- Clade: Eudicots
- Clade: Rosids
- Order: Rosales
- Family: Rhamnaceae
- Genus: Ceanothus
- Species: C. pumilus

Binomial name
- Ceanothus pumilus Greene

= Ceanothus pumilus =

Species of flowering plant

Ceanothus pumilus is a species of shrub in the family Rhamnaceae known by the common names dwarf ceanothus and Siskiyou mat.

== Range and Habitat ==
Ceanothus pumilus is native to the mountains of southern Oregon and northern California, where it grows in habitat such as coniferous forest and chaparral, usually on serpentine soils.

== Description ==
Ceanothus pumilus is a low-lying shrub taking the form of a mat or tangled mound up to about 2.5 meters wide. The small evergreen leaves are oppositely arranged, each just over a centimeter in maximum length. The leaves are thick, firm and ribbed, flat or cupped, hairless and dark green on top and generally hairy and paler in color on the undersides. The leaf usually has a distinctive three- (sometimes two-) toothed tip. Branches and twigs mature to gray and are often reddish when young. The inflorescence is an umbel-like cluster of small flowers in shades of blue, lavender, or white. When newly opened, the flowers have a closed star-like shape with protruding yellow anthers. The fruit is a horned capsule about half a centimeter long.
