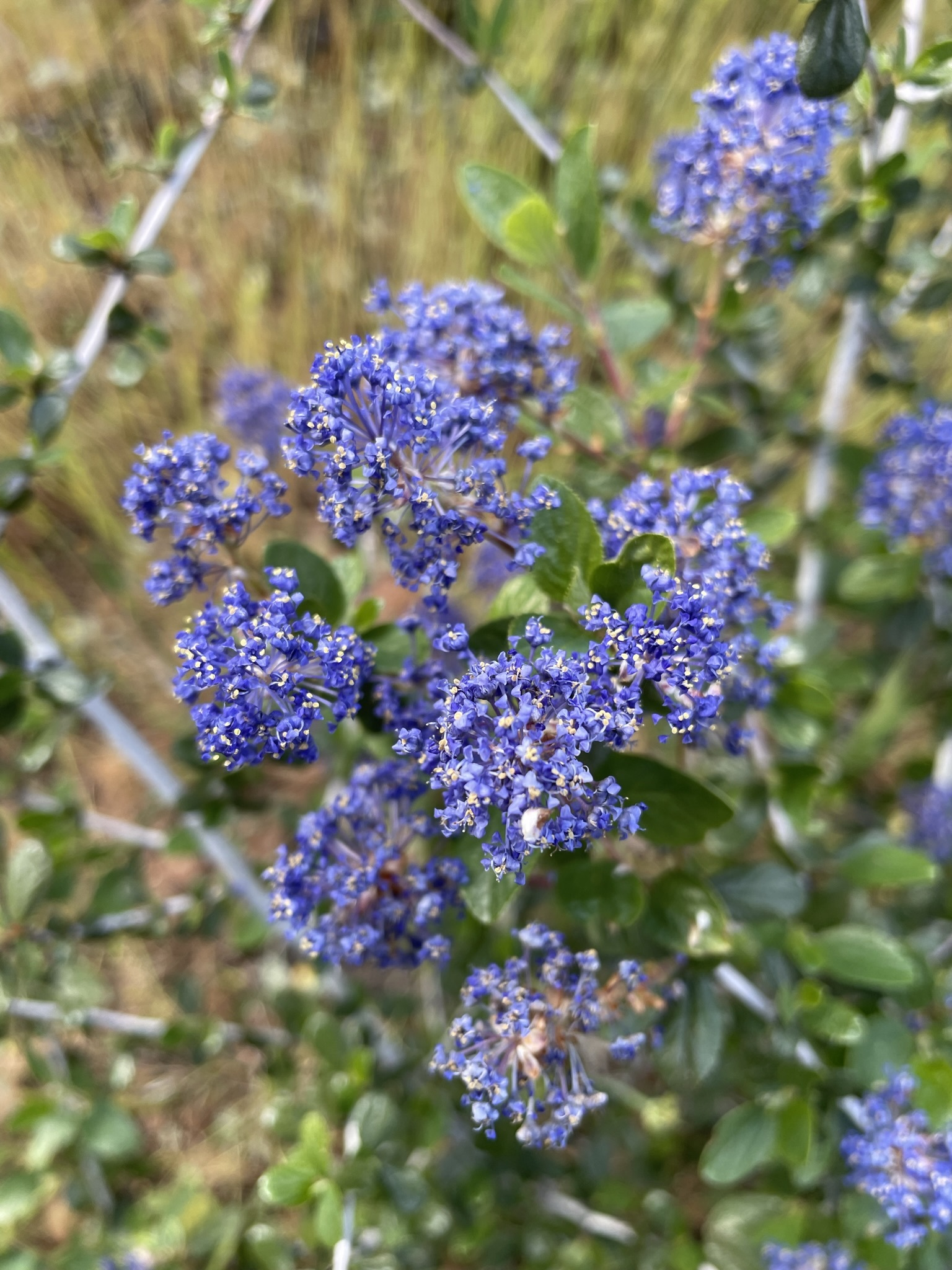

Conservation status
- Vulnerable (NatureServe)

Scientific classification
- Kingdom: Plantae
- Clade: Tracheophytes
- Clade: Angiosperms
- Clade: Eudicots
- Clade: Rosids
- Order: Rosales
- Family: Rhamnaceae
- Genus: Ceanothus
- Species: C. lemmonii

Binomial name
- Ceanothus lemmonii Parry

= Ceanothus lemmonii =

Species of flowering plant

Ceanothus lemmonii is a species of shrub in the family Rhamnaceae known by the common name Lemmon's ceanothus. It is endemic to California, where it grows on the wooded slopes of the Inner North Coast Ranges and the Sierra Nevada foothills to the west and east, respectively, of the Sacramento Valley.

== Description ==
This is a spreading shrub approaching a meter in height and slightly more in width. The woody parts are gray when aged and new twigs are green, hairy, and sometimes glandular. The evergreen leaves are alternately arranged. Each is oval in shape and dull green, densely hairy on the underside and more thinly hairy on the upper surface, and the edge is lined with tiny glandular teeth. The abundant inflorescences are clusters of pale to bright blue or purple flowers. The fruit is a smooth capsule a few millimeters long.
