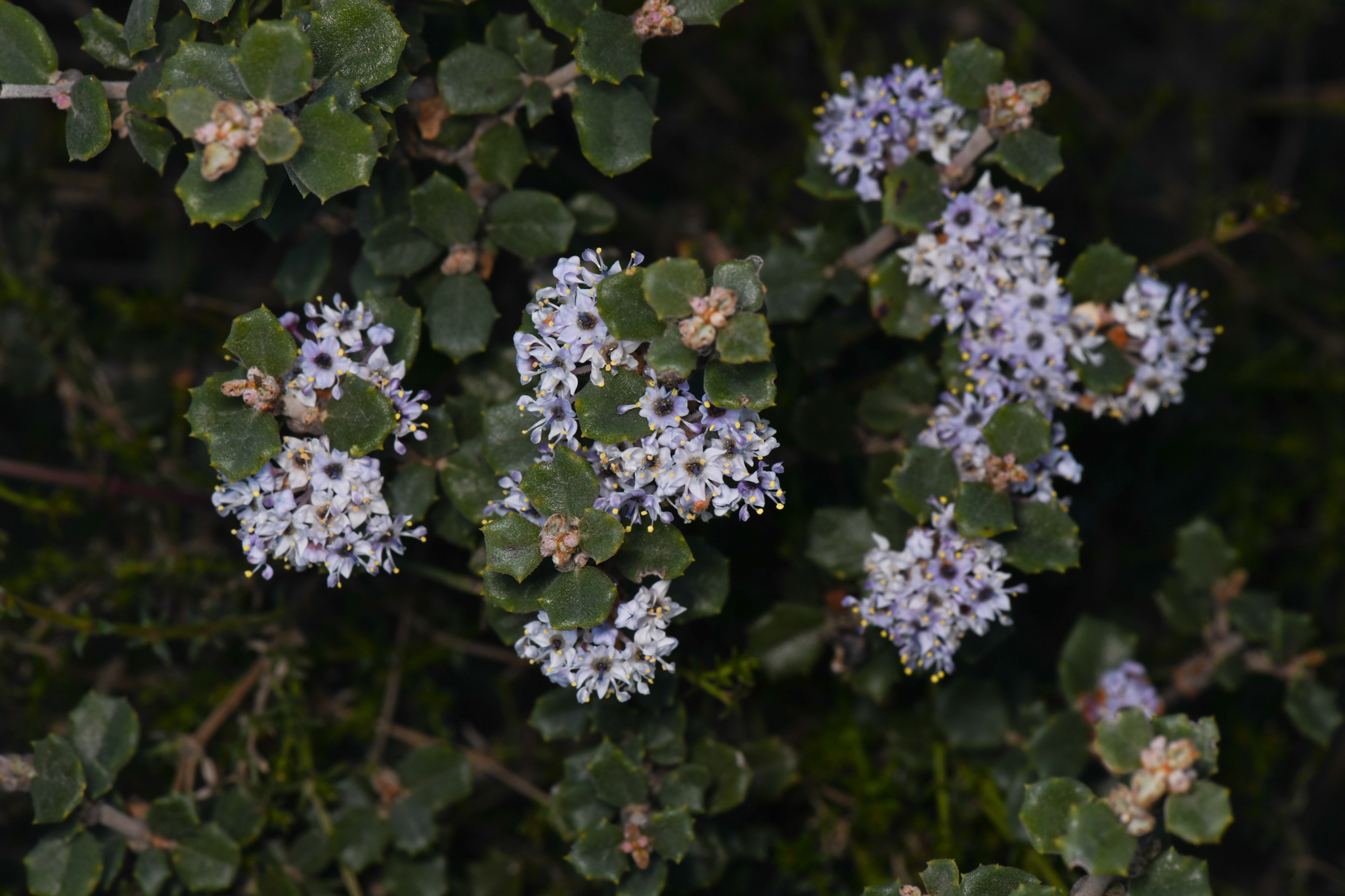

Conservation status
- Critically Imperiled (NatureServe)

Scientific classification
- Kingdom: Plantae
- Clade: Tracheophytes
- Clade: Angiosperms
- Clade: Eudicots
- Clade: Rosids
- Order: Rosales
- Family: Rhamnaceae
- Genus: Ceanothus
- Subgenus: C. subg. Cerastes
- Species: C. otayensis

Binomial name
- Ceanothus otayensis McMinn

= Ceanothus otayensis =

Otay Mountain buckbrush

Species of flowering plant

Ceanothus otayensis, the Otay Mountain buckbrush or Otay Mountain lilac, is a plant species known only from the Otay and San Miguel Mountains of San Diego County, California, and in nearby Baja California, Mexico. It occurs on dry slopes and brushlands at elevations of 600–1100 m.

Ceanothus otayensis is a shrub up to 120 cm tall, erect, not rooting at the nodes. Leaves are opposite, evergreen, broadly ovate, up to 15 mm long. Flowers are white to pale blue, borne in a spike of umbels. Fruits are spherical, about 5 mm across.
