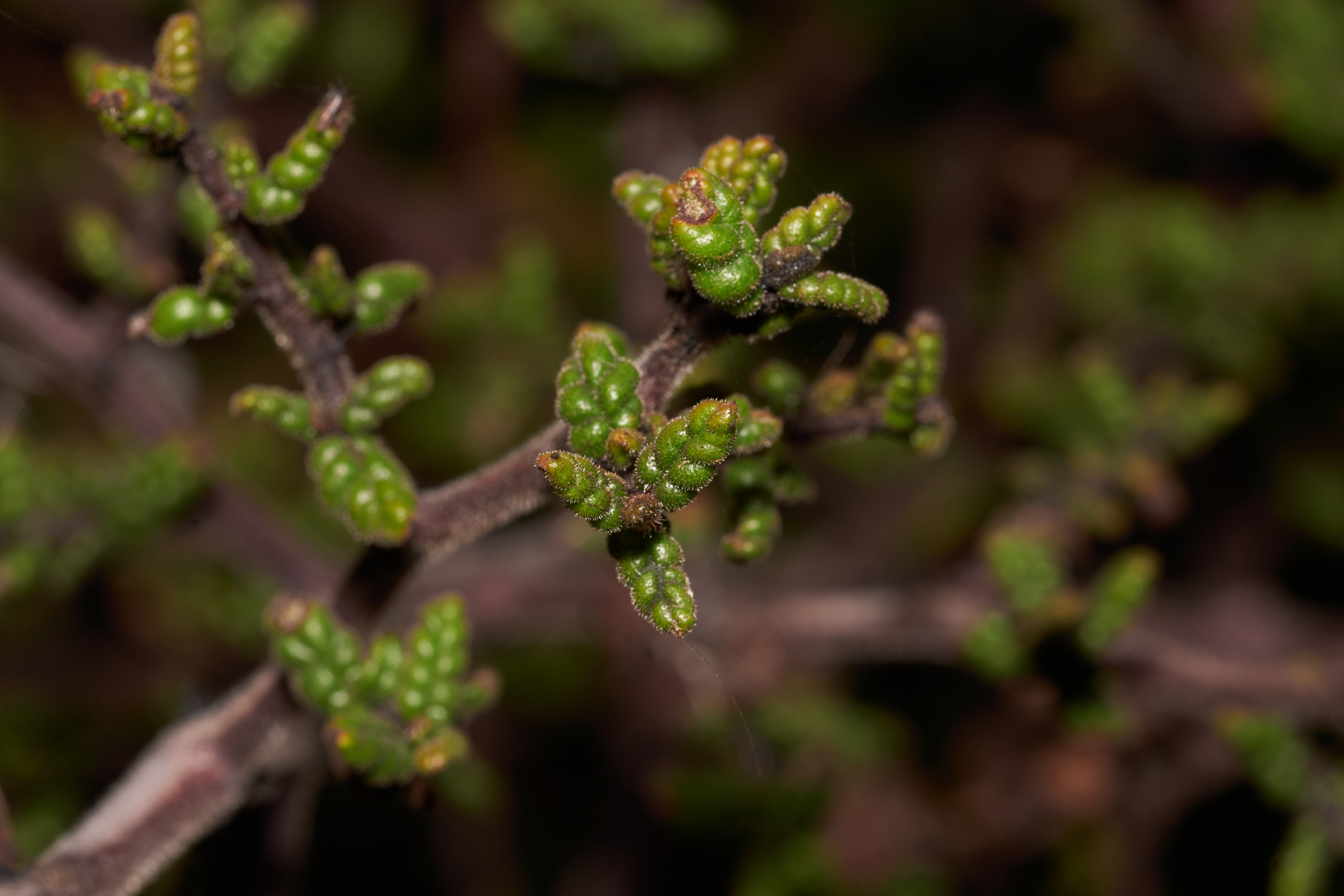
- var. impressus from Burton Mesa

Conservation status
- Vulnerable (IUCN 3.1)

- Vulnerable (NatureServe)

Scientific classification
- Kingdom: Plantae
- Clade: Tracheophytes
- Clade: Angiosperms
- Clade: Eudicots
- Clade: Rosids
- Order: Rosales
- Family: Rhamnaceae
- Genus: Ceanothus
- Species: C. impressus

Binomial name
- Ceanothus impressus Trel.

= Ceanothus impressus =

Species of flowering plant

Ceanothus impressus is a species of shrub in the family Rhamnaceae known by the common name Santa Barbara ceanothus. It is endemic to the Central Coast of California, where it is known from San Luis Obispo and Santa Barbara Counties. It occurs in chaparral habitat.

This is an upright shrub with a dense or open form, reaching up to 3 meters in height. The evergreen leaves are about 2 centimeters long and oval shaped, highly ridged and wrinkled and curling under along the edges. They may be gland-dotted and have grayish hairy undersides. The shrub flowers abundantly in inflorescences of small blue flowers. The fruit is a crested spherical capsule about 4 millimeters wide.

There are two varieties:

- C. impressus var. impressus – generally more compact with intricate branching and cupped leaves
- C. impressus var. nipomensis (Nipomo ceanothus) – a rare variety, more open in shape, known only from a region of San Luis Obispo County

== Gallery ==
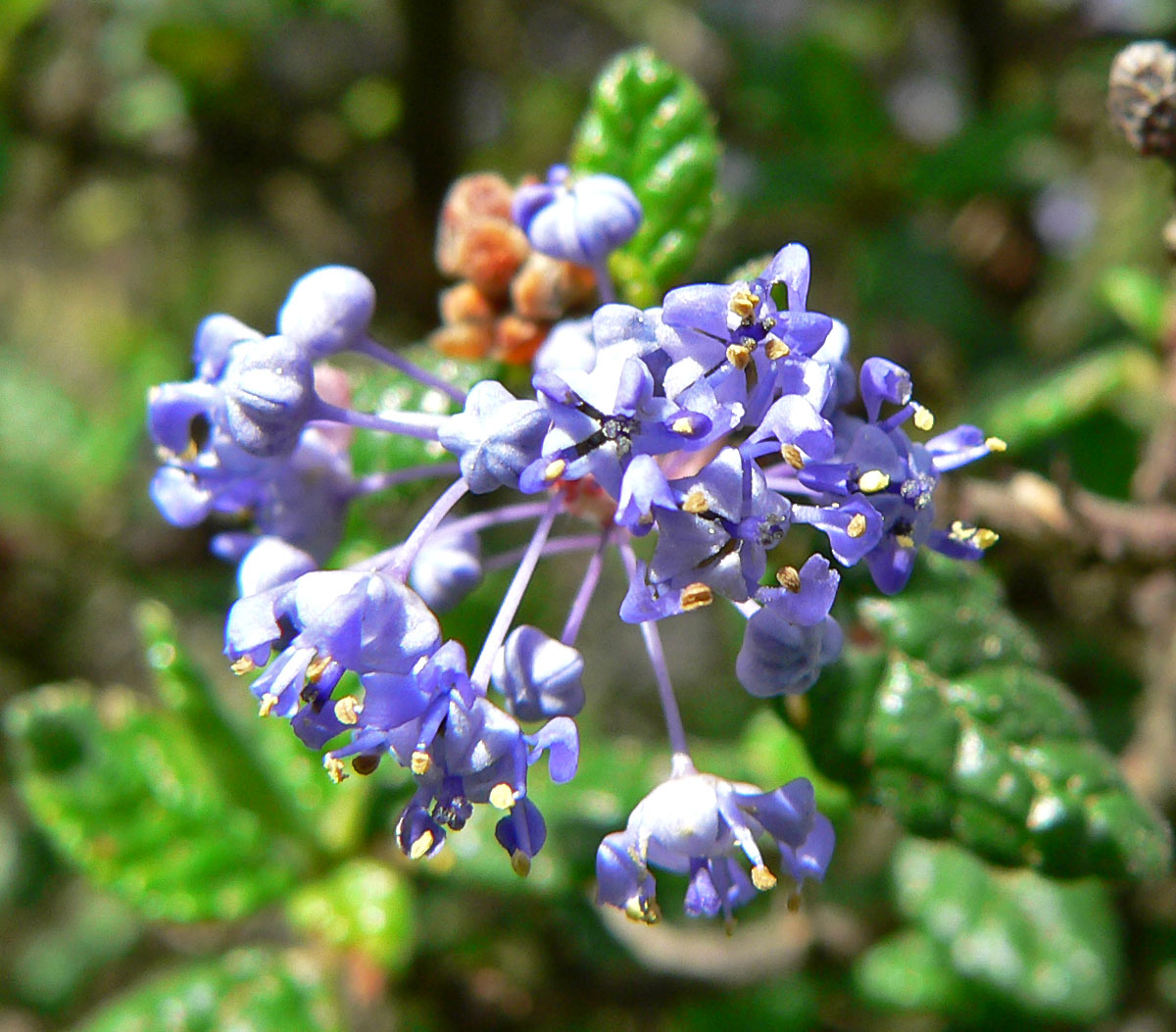
Ceanothus impressus

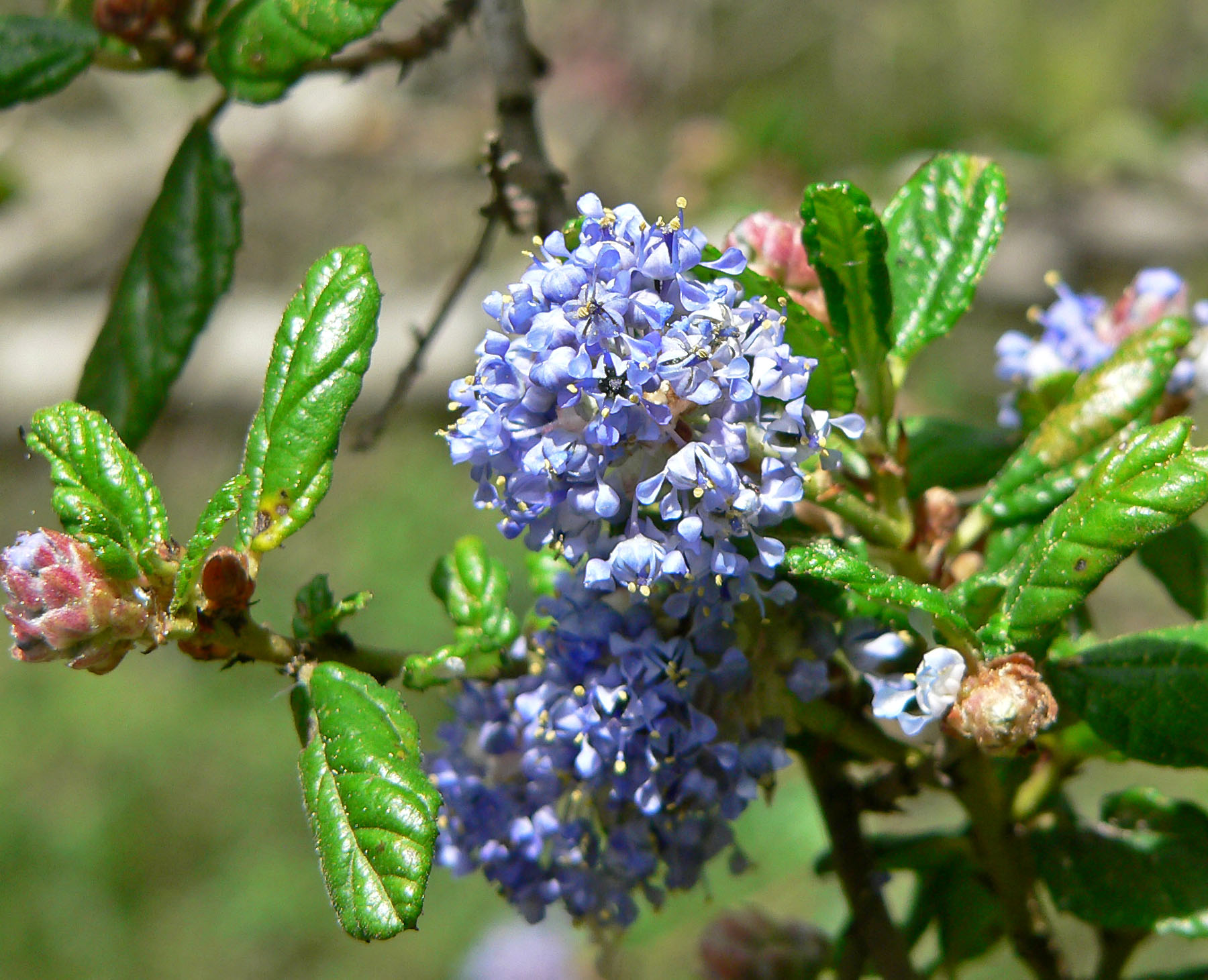
var. nipomensis

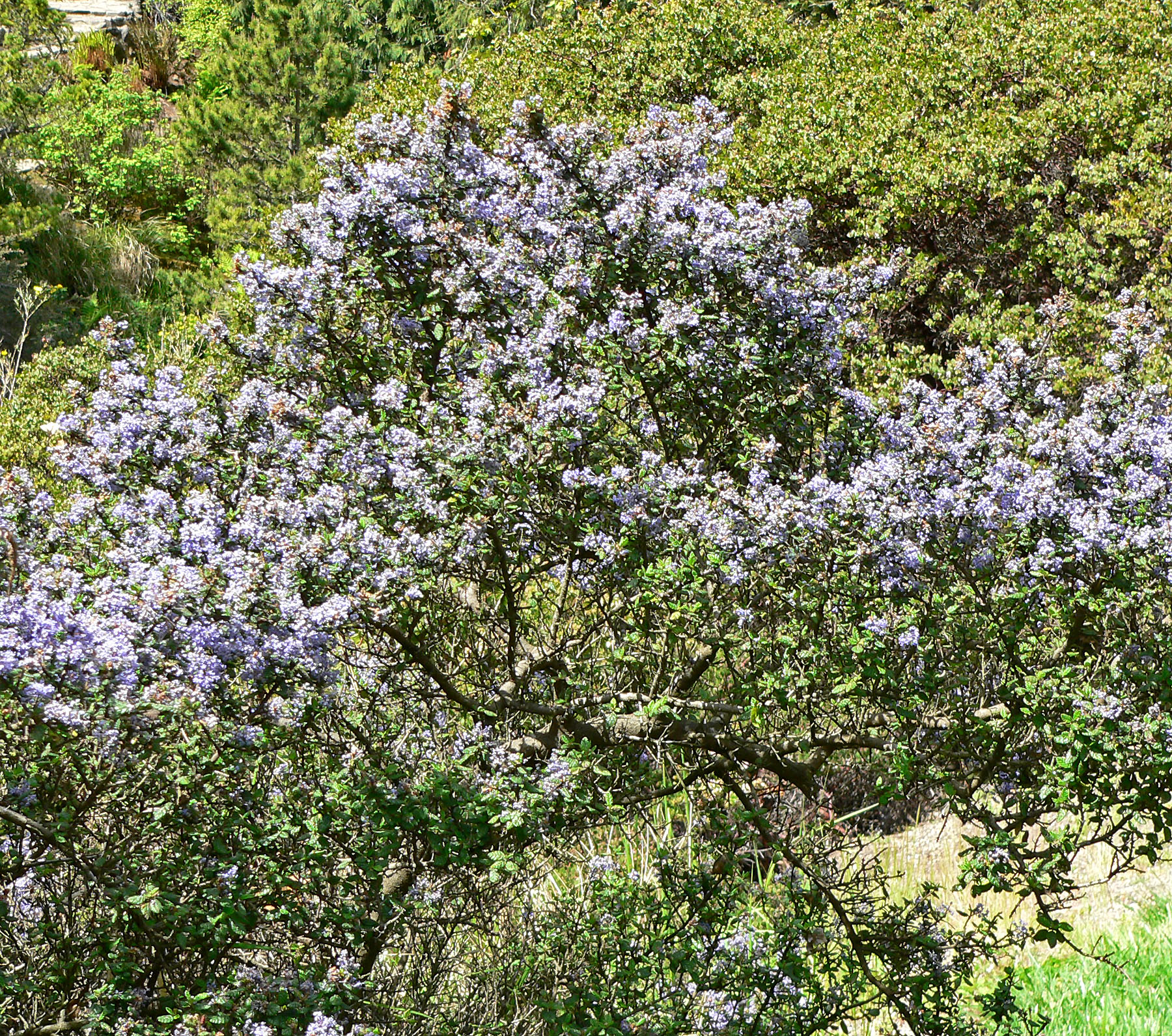
