= Bottle Rock Power Plant =

Power plant in California, United States

- Country: United States
- Location: Glenbrook area of Lake County, California
- Coordinates: 38.83490°N 122.76818°W
- Status: Standby
- Construction began: November 1980
- Commission date: February 1985
- Decommission date: 1 April 2015
- Owner: Baseload Clean Energy Partners

Geothermal power station
- Type: Steam
- Wells: 3
- Site area: 350 acres (140 ha)

Power generation
- Nameplate capacity: 55 MW

The Bottle Rock Power Plant (BRPP) is a geothermal power plant in the Glenbrook Area of Lake County, California, United States.

== Location ==
The Bottle Rock Power Plant is within a 350 acres (140 ha) leasehold near the town of Cobb on High Valley Road, Glenbrook Area, Lake County. It is in the Geyser Known Geothermal Resource Area (The Geysers). The Geysers is the world's largest geothermal field. The leasehold is about 3.4 miles (5.5 km) northwest of the village of Whispering Pines. Bottle Rock Road runs north–south less than 1 mile (1.6 km) east of the site. Small resort communities along the main access roads include Whispering Pines, Forest Lake, Cobb, Pine Grove, Hobergs and Loch Lomond. The steam supply field is on the Lake-Sonoma County Line. It is a few miles northwest of Cobb Mountain, southwest of Glenbrook and near the northern border of the Geysers KGRA.

== Plant ==
The power plant was built on a 5.9 acres (2.4 ha) multi-level pad at elevations of 2,690 to 2,700 feet (820 to 820 m). The turbine generator was housed in a 105 by 75 feet (32 by 23 m) rectangular concrete building about 65 feet (20 m) high. Power is delivered by a single 55 MW dry-steam geothermal turbine-generator from Fuji Electric. The plant includes a steam field with three well pads, a Stretford system designed by Peabody Energy to abate hydrogen sulfide, a cooling tower and condenser system.

== History ==
=== DWR (1980–2001) ===
The BRPP was first owned by the California Department of Water Resources (DWR). It was certified in November 1980 and after construction started operation in February 1985. DWR suspended operation in November 1990 because the steam field was only producing around 15 MW. The plant was put into cold stand-by status. DWR began efforts to sell the facility.

=== BRP (2001–2015) ===
In May 2001 the Bottle Rock Power Corporation (BRPC) took over ownership. US Renewables Group and Riverstone-Carlyle took over the project and funded BRP Holdco, which owned Bottle Rock Power (BRP). In December 2006 ownership was transferred from BRPC to BRP. The California Energy Commission approved restart of operations by BRP after various design changes at the facility. The power plant came online on 1 October 2007. In the period from 2008 to 2014 the steam turbine facility generated around 75,000 MWH annually. Cobb residents complained about the traffic, noise, grading and environmental management at the power plant during this period. On 1 April 2015 BRP announced the plant was being shut down and placed in standby mode.

=== BCEP (2015–present) ===
On 20 November 2015 Baseload Clean Energy Partners (BCEP) bought BRP Holdco from US Renewables Group and Riverstone-Carlyle. BCEP is owned and operated by AltaRock Energy. It planned to upgrade the plant to include energy storage so it could optimize energy delivery based on demand. In January 2019 AltaRock Energy said it planned to build and test a new thermoelectric generator exploiting the Seebeck effect at the Bottle Rock facility. The project was supported by the Electric Program Investment Charge (EPIC) program of the California Energy Commission. If successful, the approach would make smaller scale geothermal plants more economically viable.

== Sources ==
- "Bottle Rock Geothermal Power Plant". CEC California Energy Commission. 2007-10-01. Archived from the original on 2021-04-22.
- Draft environmental impact report. California Department of Water Resources, Bottle Rock geothermal power plant, Lake County, CA (Report). Sacramento: California Energy Commission. 1979-12-01. doi:10.2172/6887368. OSTI 6887368.
- Larson, Elizabeth (27 November 2015). "Bottle Rock Power sold to energy portfolio owned by AltaRock Energy". Lake County News.
- Net generation : Bottle Rock Power (902), U.S. Energy Information Administration, archived from the original on 2021-04-23
- Richter, Alexander (23 November 2015). "AltaRock Energy firm buys Bottle Rock geothermal plant in the Geysers". ThinkGeoEnergy (Press release).
- Richter, Alexander (1 January 2019). "AltaRock Energy to test new thermoelectric generator at Bottle Rock geothermal site". ThinkGeoenergy (Press release).
