= Forest Lake Resort =

Forest Lake
- Resort
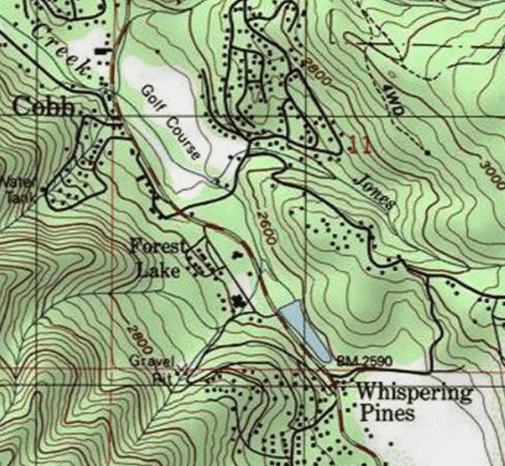
- Forest Lake between Cobb (NW) and Whispering Pines (SE). Buildings on the SW side of Hwy 175, golf course and lake on the NE side

- Location in California Forest Lake (the United States)
- Coordinates: 38°49′05″N 122°43′04″W
- Country: United States
- State: California
- County: Lake County
- Elevation: 2,631 ft (802 m)

Forest Lake Resort was a resort in the Cobb Mountain area of Lake County, California, in an area of wet meadows along Kelsey Creek. Originally a campground, it was developed into a resort in the 1930s to exploit the growing automobile-based recreation market. The resort was sold in 1963. By 1989 it was no longer operational, and was being considered for development as a community park site.

== Location ==
Forest Lake is 0.25 miles (0.4 km) northwest of Whispering Pines. It is at an elevation of 2,631 feet (802 m). Forest Lake is dominated by wet meadow and waterway features. Kelsey Creek, from Forest Lake downstream to around Glenbrook, is a federally designated flood boundary. That is, it is a floodplain that is expected to be inundated every 100 years.

== Early years ==
Originally the Forest Lake property was the home of James Hartford Smith, who bought the land in 1868. His son Nate turned it into a campground, which he ran with his wife, which passed in turn to his son Will in 1900. Will Smith sold the campground to Hugh Davey. Jim McCauley had operated a brewery in Vallejo, but Prohibition in 1920 forced him to look for new sources of revenue. He lent money to Davey with the campground and Boggs Mountain as collateral. Davey defaulted in 1922 and McCauley's Calso Company became the owner.

McCauley bottled "Calso Water" at the Camp Calso spring. It was thought to help relieve hangovers, and was popular between 1924 and 1942. (Note: In 1934 the Calso Co. was accused of misbranding and violation of the Food and Drugs Act with its Calso Water. The statements regarding the curative and therapeutic effects were found to be false and fraudulent. As noted by The New York Times in 1979, Calso water might come from the Sierra Nevado, but the company got it from a city tap.) In 1926 he created the Camp Calso residential subdivision as a speculation. Many of the lots were very small, and there was no provision for water, sewer or drainage. (Note: Roads in the Camp Calso subdivision include Edgewood Way, now partly in Whispering Pines to the south. Under the 1989 Cobb Mountain Area Plan, parts of the Camp Calso subdivision were transferred to the Substandard Older Subdivision Combining District.)

== Resort ==
McCauley decided to turn the campground into a resort, originally named Camp Calso. He put up the main building in 1930. The resort was among the new automobile-oriented vacation resorts developed in the 1930s, others being Whispering Pines and Pine Grove. Many of the older resorts did not make the transition to automobiles and had to close down. McCauley dammed a branch of Kelsey Creek to create Lake McCauley in 1935. He built cabins, and in 1937 made a swimming pool. Guests at the resort played a game named Calso after the bottled water. similar to Bingo. Dance music was provided by entertainers such as Jimmy Catalano and his Band.

McCauley renamed Camp Calso to Forest Lake Resort in 1938. He and his niece's husband Vince Emerson ran the resort successfully until 1939, when Emerson took full responsibility. McCauley died on 26 December 1942. His property was divided between seven nieces and nephews, one of whom was Vince Emerson's son Don, who lived near the resort in Cobb. (Note: The Boggs Mountain property was later purchased by the State of California for use as the Boggs Mountain Demonstration State Forest.) Husband and wife Vince and Marian Emerson ran the resort until Vince died in 1946, when the resort continued to be run by Marian and their son Don. Don in turn owned and ran it with his wife Dorothy from 1950 to 1963, creating the Hoberg's Forest Lake Golf Course in 1954. (Note: Donald and Dorothy Emerson bought the resort from other members of their family when Emerson was 21. Emerson was twice president of the Lake County Chamber of Commerce, and was twice president of the Redwood Empire Association.) (Note: The nine-hole Hoberg's Forest Lake Golf Course later became the Cobb Meadows Golf Course, then the Rob Roy Golf Club, then Cobb Mountain Golf, then Black Rock Golf Course.) Many family activities were available, including horseback riding. Supervised activities were provided for children, including swimming in the pool, games, hay rides and special meal times. The Emersons sold the resort to Joe Breen and Vic Tamera in 1963. Later Forest Lake became the property of Calistoga Mineral Water, a subsidiary of Nestlé.

== Later developments ==
As of 1989 7.8 acres (3.2 ha) of vacant land beside the Forest Lake area was zoned for of low-density residential planned development. Zoning allowed residential and commercial development along California State Route 175 north of the Forest Lake area to the Bottle Rock Road intersection, but half the commercial space was vacant or underutilized. Some planned development commercial zoning applied to open space at Forest Lake on land with sensitive environmental resources adjacent to previously approved planned development. Portions of Forest Lake were designated for resource conservation land uses.

A plan for the Cobb Mountain Area issued in 1989 discussed developing Forest Lake as a park facility. The 1989 Cobb Mountain Area plan recommended that its recreational development be limited to low-cost passive facilities such as picnic sites, trails and walkways, and should be improved for outdoors activities such as fishing and wildlife observation. It could be classified as a community park site. The Cobb Area Council held a public meeting on 18 April 2019 where it was reported that the county was still not looking at changing Forest Lake into a park, although there was local support for the idea.

== Sources ==
- Blackburn, Mark (11 April 1979), "A Mineral‐Water Rush Out West", The New York Times
- "Black Rock Golf Course", GolfCalifornia.com
- Dillon, Brian D. (1995), History and Prehistory of Boggs Mountain Demonstration State Forest, Lake County, California, State of California, California Department of Forestry and Fire Protection, Archaeology Office
- Durham, David L. (1998). California's Geographic Names: A Gazetteer of Historic and Modern Names of the State. Clovis, California: Word Dancer Press. p. 61. ISBN 1-884995-14-4.
- "Emerson remembered for community involvement, generosity", Lake County News, 20 June 2010
- "Forest Lake". Geographic Names Information System. United States Geological Survey, United States Department of the Interior.
- Hoberg, Donna (2007). Resorts of Lake County. Arcadia Publishing. ISBN 9780738547985.
- Lake County Planning Department (May 1989), Cobb Mountain Area Plan (PDF) (Preliminary Draft), archived from the original (PDF) on 2021-04-23
- Larson, Elizabeth (14 November 2012), "Former Rob Roy golf course reopens as Cobb Mountain Golf", Lake County News
- Larson, Elzabeth (19 January 2015), "County officials work on plan to address thousands of paper subdivision lots", Lake County News
- Parker, John (2015), Cultural Resource Evaluation of Hoberg's Resort, Lake County, California
- Pyska, Jessica (29 April 2019), Minutes- April 18, 2019, Cobb Area Council
- Turner, Judge (13 December 1951), Calso Co. v. Commissioner, 10 T.C.M. 1165 (Tax Ct. 1951), United States Tax Court
- United States. Food and Drug Administration (1935), Notices of Judgment Under the Food and Drugs Act, U.S. Government Printing Office
- "Way: Edgewood Way (10267574)", OpenStreetMap
