= Geothermal energy in the United States =

Overview of geothermal power in the United States of America

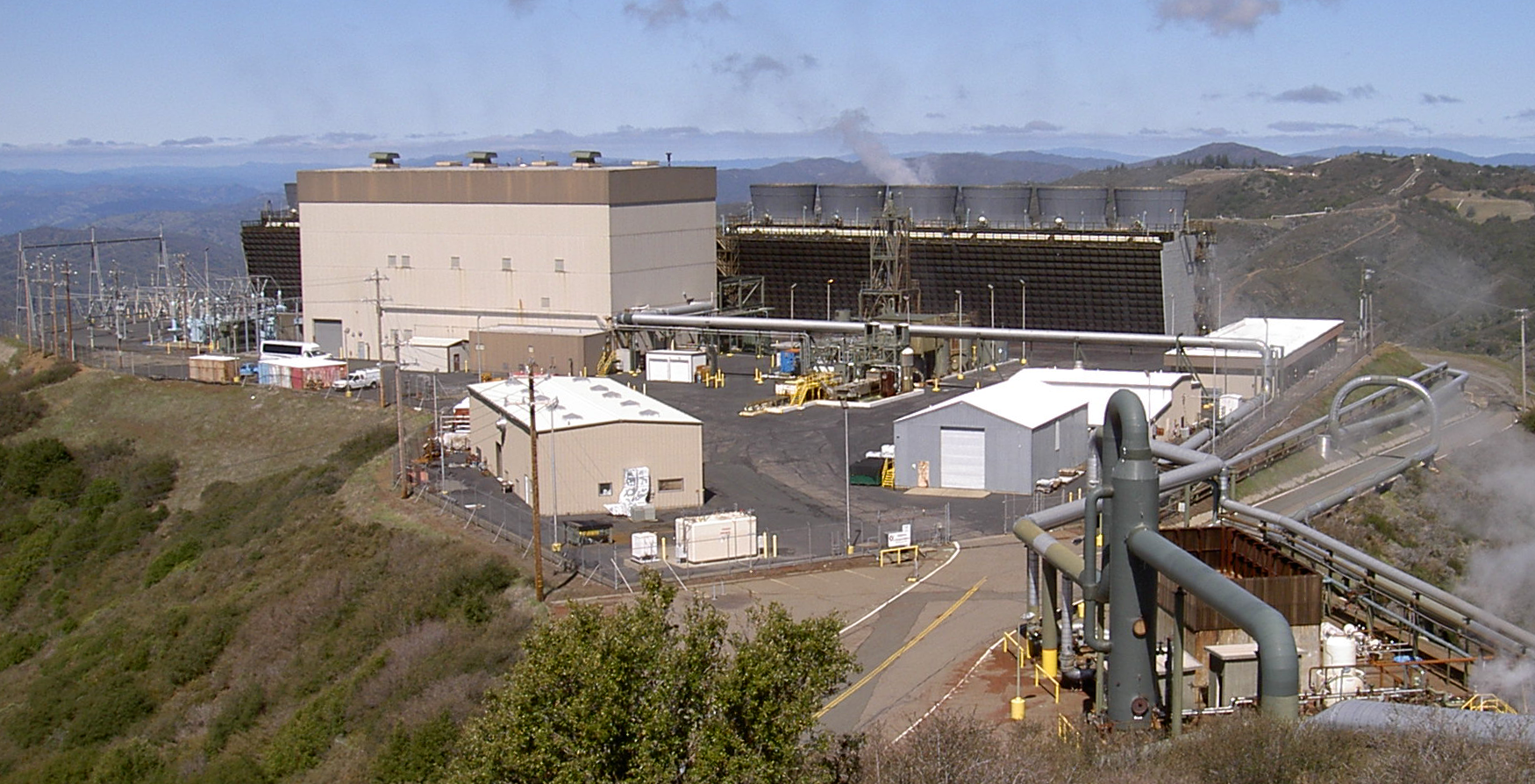
The Sonoma Calpine 3 geothermal power station of The Geysers

Geothermal energy in the United States was first used for electric power production in 1960. The Geysers in Sonoma and Lake counties, California was developed into what is now the largest geothermal steam electrical plant in the world, at 1,517 megawatts. Other geothermal steam fields are known in the western United States and Alaska. Geothermally generated electric power can be dispatchable to follow the demands of changing loads. Environmental impact of this energy source includes hydrogen sulfide emissions, corrosive or saline chemicals discharged in waste water, possible seismic effects from water injection into rock formations, waste heat and noise.

== History ==
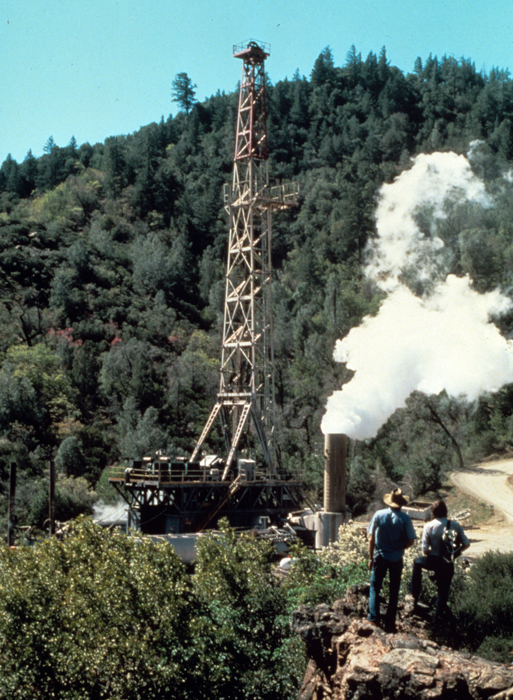
Geothermal drilling at The Geysers in California, 1977

Archaeological evidence documents that geothermal resources have been in use in the US for more than 10,000 years. Paleo-Indians first used geothermal hot springs for warmth, cleansing, and minerals.

Pacific Gas and Electric opened the US's first commercial geothermal power plant at The Geysers in California in September 1960, initially producing eleven megawatts of net power. The Geysers system grew into the world's largest, with an output of 750 MW. It exploits the largest dry steam field, 116 km (72 mi) north of San Francisco. The original turbine lasted for more than 30 years.

Near Several small power plants were built during the late 1980s in the Basin and Range geologic province in Nevada, southeastern Oregon, southwestern Idaho, Arizona and western Utah. is now an area of rapid geothermal development.

In the Salton Sea Geothermal Field, 11 commercial geothermal power plants are in operation. The Hudson Ranch I plant, a 50 MW facility, opened in May 2012. As of 2025, geothermal power plants operated in seven U.S. states and supplied about 0.4% of the country's utility-scale electricity, and the United States had a total summer capacity of 2.7 GW of conventional geothermal power.

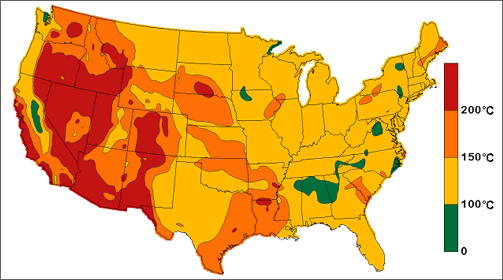
Estimated subterranean temperatures at a depth of 6 kilometers

The most significant development catalyst is the Energy Policy Act of 2005. This Act made new geothermal plants eligible for the full federal production tax credit, previously available only to wind power projects and certain kinds of biomass. It also authorized and directed increased funding for research by the Department of Energy, and enabled the Bureau of Land Management to address its backlog of geothermal leases and permits.

In April 2008, exploratory drilling began at Newberry Volcano in Oregon. As of August 2008, 103 new projects were under way in 13 US states. When developed, these projects could potentially supply up to 3,979 MW of power, meeting the needs of about 4 million homes. The DOE Geothermal Technologies Program (part of the American Recovery and Reinvestment Act of 2009) allowed the USDOE to fund research in Enhanced Geothermal Systems (EGS) to learn more about the fracture systems in geothermal reservoirs and better predict the results of reservoir stimulation.

In 2009, investment bank Credit Suisse calculated that geothermal power costs 3.6 cents per kilowatt-hour, versus 5.5 cents per kilowatt-hour for coal, if geothermal receives subsidized loans.

A report released in late May 2019 by the Department of Energy suggests that US geothermal power capacity could increase by more than twenty-six times by 2050, reaching a capacity of 60 GW, thanks to accelerated technological development and adoption. The report documented the benefits of geothermal power for residential and industrial heating. Energy Secretary Rick Perry announced his Department had provided funding for a $140-million research facility at the University of Utah on man-made geothermal energy.

In 2018 the Department of Energy (DOE), launched the Frontier Observatory for Research in Geothermal Energy (FORGE).

In 2018, due to volcanic activity the Puna Geothermal Venture in Hawaii had to be closed and was inundated by lava flows. It reopened in November 2020.

In 2023, Houston-based startup Fervo began sending electricity to the grid from its 3.5 MW enhanced geothermal system Project Red. The project used horizontal drilling to drill two wells and access additional thermal resources. The company began drilling for a 400 MW project involving 100 wells in Beaver County, Utah. In 2024 the company announced a 70% YoY reduction in drilling times, achieving 70 ft/hr in granite and >430 °F (221 °C).

Zanskar is developing an artificial intelligence to identify additional geothermal energy sources in North America. As of 2026, they had identified 40 gigawatts of new, accessible energy sources at relatively shallow depths. They estimate that drilling costs would be ~$2M/well, far less than deep well projects.

== Production ==
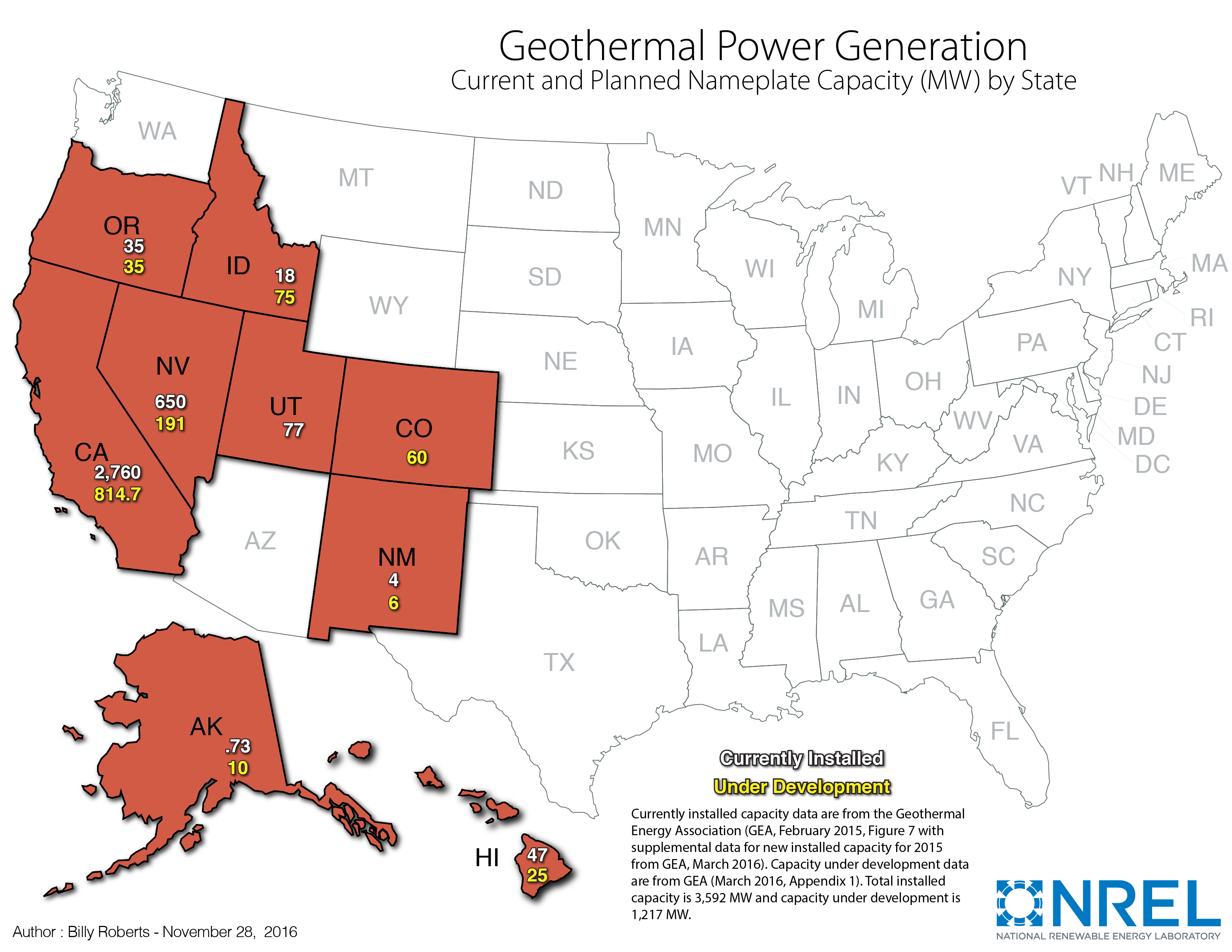
Existing and planned US geothermal power generation, April 2015

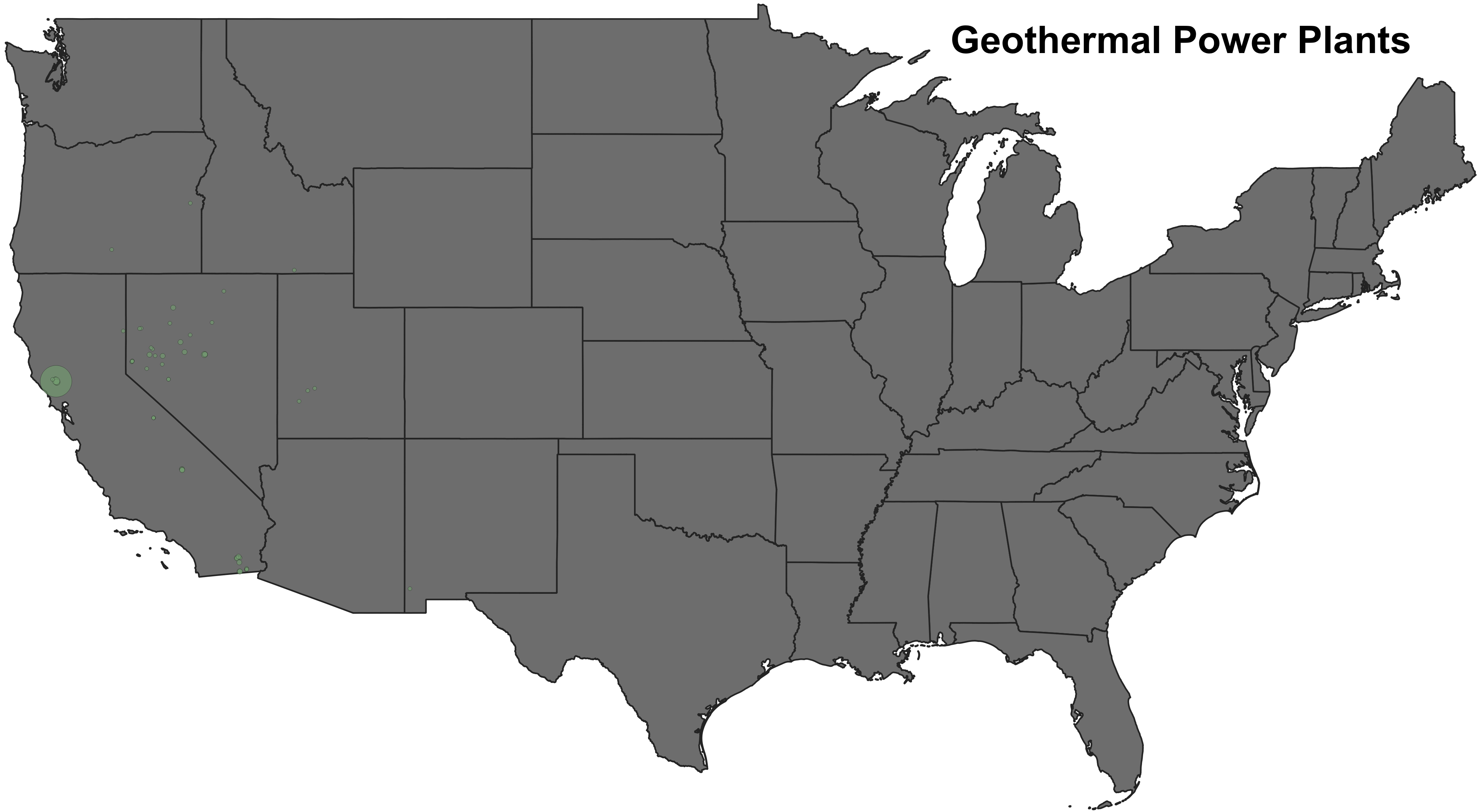
Geothermal power stations in the United States

With 3,900 MW of installed geothermal capacity as of 2023, the US remains the world leader with about 25% of the online capacity total. The future outlook for expanded production from conventional and enhanced geothermal systems is positive as new technologies promise increased growth in locations previously not considered.

Geothermal generation by year in the United States (TWhr)

=== By state ===
Geothermal production in terawatt hours (TWh) by state as of December 2023

| State | Production (TWh) | Share of U.S. total |
|---|---|---|
| California | 10,962 | 66.6% |
| Nevada | 4,296 | 26.1% |
| Utah | 521 | 3.2% |
| Hawaii | 348 | 2.1% |
| Oregon | 212 | 1.3% |
| Idaho | 86 | 0.5% |
| New Mexico | 36 | 0.2% |
| Total | 16,462 | 100% |

=== Geysers ===
The Geysers has 1517 megawatt (MW) of active installed capacity with an average capacity factor of 63%. Calpine Corporation owns 15 of the 18 active plants in the Geysers and is the US's largest producer of geothermal energy. Two other plants are owned jointly by the Northern California Power Agency and Silicon Valley Power. The remaining Bottle Rock Power Plant is owned by the US Renewables Group. A nineteenth plant is under development by Ram Power. The Geysers is recharged by injecting treated sewage effluent from the City of Santa Rosa and the Lake County sewage treatment plant. This effluent used to be dumped into rivers and streams and is now piped to the geothermal field where it replenishes the steam produced for power generation.

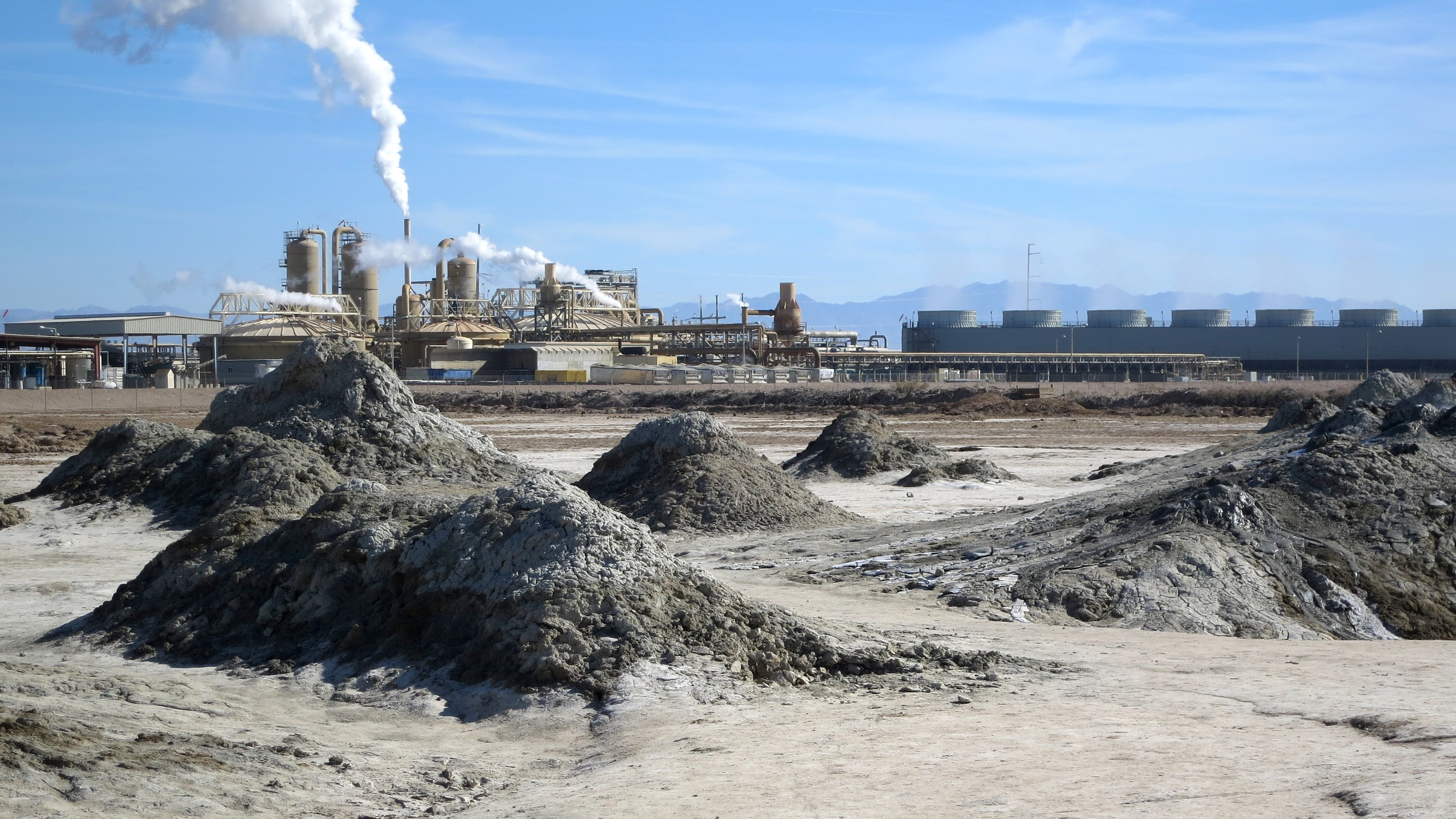
Naturally occurring mud volcanoes next to a modern geothermal plant near the Salton Sea

=== Salton Sea ===
Another major geothermal area is located in south central California, on the southeast side of the Salton Sea, near Niland and Calipatria, California. 15 geothermal plants combine for a capacity of about 570 MW. Cal Energy owns about half of them and the rest are owned by various companies.

=== Basin and Range ===
The Basin and Range geologic province in Nevada, southeastern Oregon, southwestern Idaho, Arizona and western Utah hosts 19 geothermal power plants in Nevada that produce more than 486 MW. The largest plant is the McGinnis Hills facility operated by Ormat with a capacity of 96 MW. Other geothermal plants in Nevada are at Steamboat Springs, Brady/Desert Peak, Dixie Valley, Soda Lake, Stillwater and Beowawe.

=== Hawaii ===
Puna Geothermal Venture operates a geothermal power plant in Puna, Hawaii. Its capacity is 25.7 MWe. The plant reopened in 2020 following Kilauea's 2018 eruption that destroyed part of the plant.

== Reliability ==
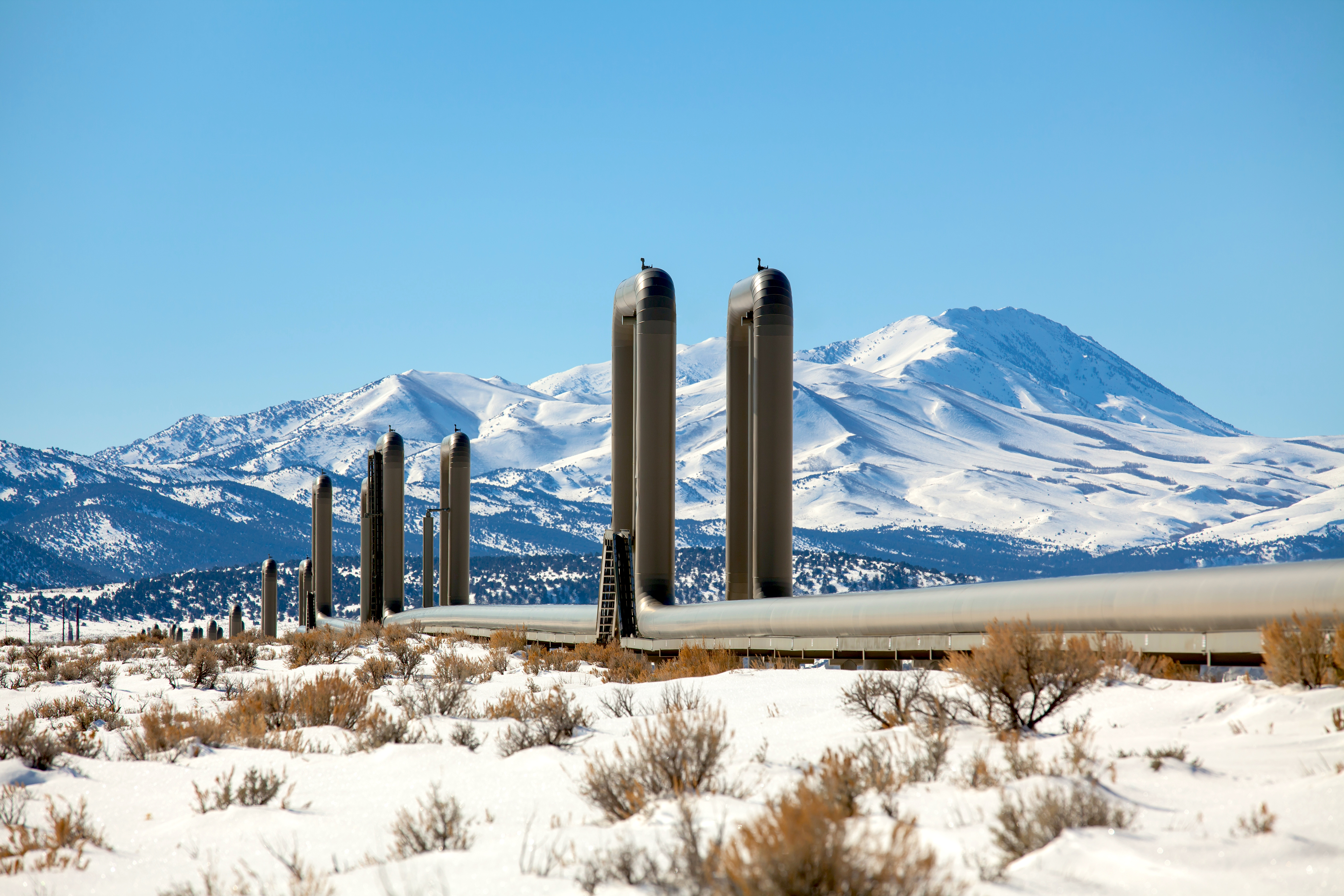
Pipelines of the McGinness Hills Geothermal Complex in Nevada

Unlike power sources such as wind and solar, geothermal energy is dispatchable, meaning that it is both available whenever needed, and can quickly adjust output to match demand. According to the US Energy Information Administration (EIA), of all types of new electrical generation plants, geothermal generators have the highest capacity factor, a measure of how much power a facility actually generates as a percent of its maximum capacity.

The EIA rates new geothermal plants as having a 92% capacity factor, comparable to those of nuclear (90%), and higher than gas (87%), or coal (85%), and much higher than those of intermittent sources such as onshore wind (34%) or solar photovoltaic (25%). While the carrier medium for geothermal electricity (water) must be properly managed, the source of geothermal energy, the Earth's heat, will be available, for most intents and purposes, indefinitely.

== National Geothermal Data System ==
The US operates the National Geothermal Data System (NGDS). Through the NGDS, many older paper archives and drill logs stored at state geological surveys are now being digitized and made available for free to the public.

== Cost ==
The initial cost for the field and power plant is around $2500 per installed kW in the U.S., probably $3000 to $5000/kWe for a small (<1Mwe) power plant. Operating and maintenance costs range from $0.01 to $0.03 per kWh.

— US Department of Energy, 2022

== Environmental effects ==
The underground hot water and steam used to generate geothermal power may contain chemical pollutants, such as hydrogen sulfide (H_{2}S).

H_{2}S is toxic in high concentrations, and is sometimes found in geothermal systems. Newer production methods separate the hot steam collected underground from the steam used to power turbines, and substantially reduce the risk of releasing contaminants.

The water mixed with the steam contains dissolved salts that can damage pipes and harm aquatic ecosystems. Some subsurface water associated with geothermal sources contains high concentrations of toxic elements such as boron, lead, and arsenic.

Injection of water in enhanced geothermal systems may induce seismicity. Earthquakes at the Geysers geothermal field in California, the largest being Richter magnitude 4.6, have been linked to injected water.

"Possible effects include scenery spoliation, drying out of hot springs, soil erosion, noise pollution, and chemical pollution of the atmosphere and of surface- and groundwaters."

== See also ==
- Geothermal desalination
- Geothermal Energy Association
- Geothermal Resources Council
- Commons: Category: Maps of geothermal resources of the United States
- List of hot springs in the United States
- New drilling technologies
- Quaise — company that does a millimeter-wave drilling system for converting existing power stations to use superdeep geothermal energy

US renewables:

- Renewable energy in the United States
- Biofuel in the United States
- Hydroelectric power in the United States
- List of renewable energy companies in the United States
- Solar power in the United States
- Wind power in the United States

International:

- List of renewable energy topics by country
