= Kelsey Creek, California =

Kelsey Creek, California may refer to:

- Kelsey Creek (Lake County), a tributary of Clear Lake in Lake County, California
- Kelseyville, California, a town formerly called Kelsey Creek, just south of Clear Lake in Lake County, California
