= Sustainable Energy Coalition =

American political advocacy group

The Sustainable Energy Coalition (SEC) is a political advocacy group that seeks to influence federal policies and funding related to energy policy.

== History ==
The group was founded in 1992, and represents 60 regional and national, environmental, political, consumer, business and energy policy organizations.

== Goals ==
The Coalition advocates increased federal support for energy efficiency and renewable energy technologies. They also recommend reducing federal support for non-sustainable energy resources (by virtue of their polluting qualities, or safety issues involved in their extraction or waste generation).

=== Membership ===
Membership includes advocates of renewable fuels, hydrogen, methanol, ethanol, and other biofuels. Also included in membership are companies selling products including energy conservation devices and controls. A few of the coalition member organizations are:

- American Wind Energy Association
- Austin Energy. a utility promoting wind power
- Bullitt Foundation
- Environmental and Energy Study Institute
- Geothermal Energy Association
- GE Wind Energy
- Global Green USA
- Greenpeace USA
- National Hydrogen Association
- National Hydropower Association
- Nuclear Information & Resource Service
- Ocean Renewable Energy Coalition, an advocate for wave farm technology
- Public Citizen
- Sacramento Municipal Utility District
- Union of Concerned Scientists

== See also ==
- Alliance to Save Energy - a group with similar energy conservation goals
