= Kelsey Creek (Lake County) =

Watercourse in Lake County, California, United States

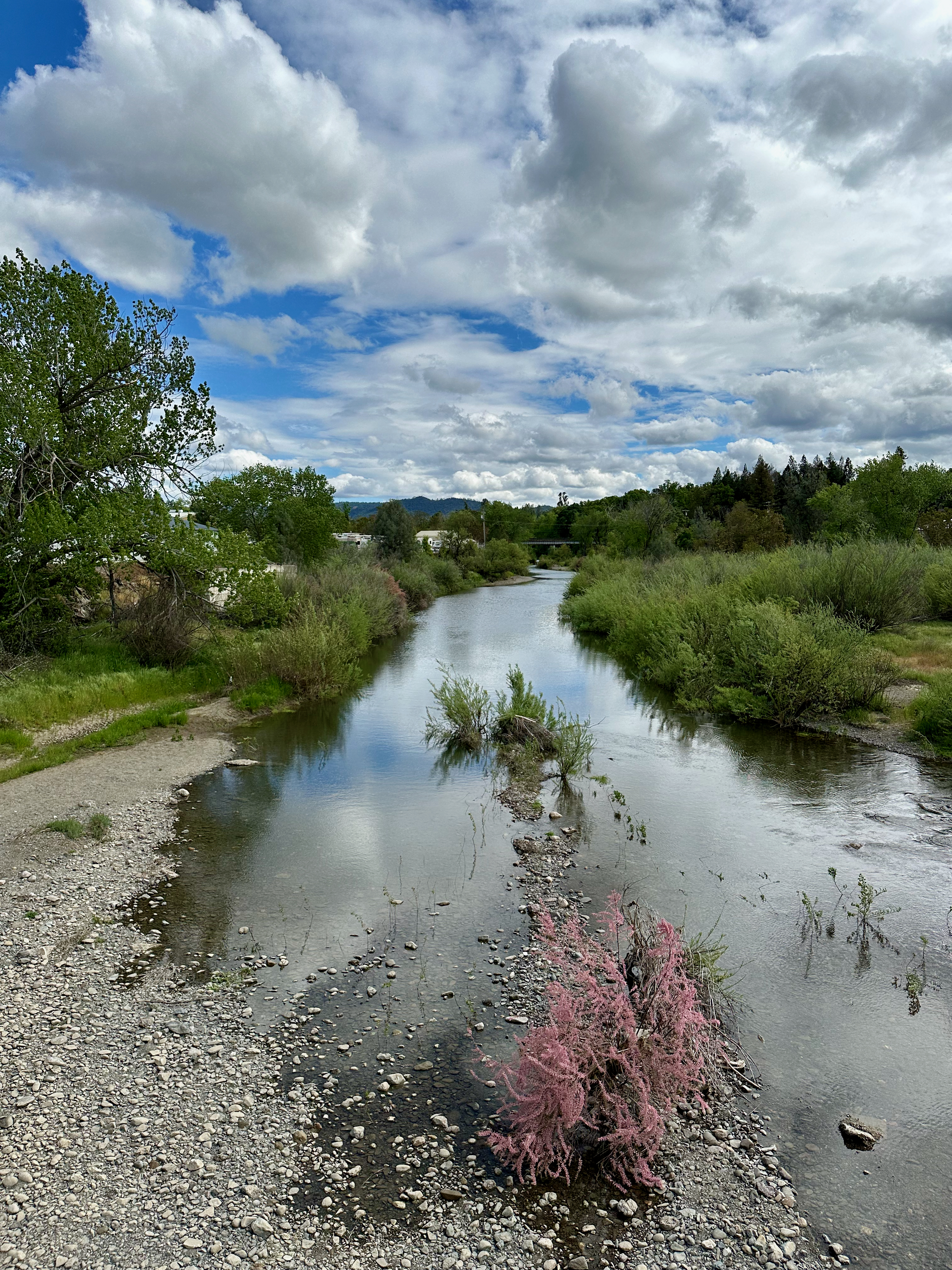
- Kelsey Creek, looking south from the Lake County Veterans Bridge in Kelseyville

- Location within California

Location
- Country: United States
- State: California
- County: Lake County

Physical characteristics
- Source: Cobb Mountain
  - coordinates: 38.810951°N 122.730355°W
  - elevation: 3,840 feet (1,170 m)
- Mouth: Clear Lake
  - location: Clear Lake State Park
  - coordinates: 39.021722°N 122.814972°W
  - elevation: 1,318 feet (402 m)
- Length: 22.5 miles (36.2 km)
- Basin size: 28,614 acres (11,580 ha)
- Discharge
  - location: Clear Lake
  - average: 81.9 cubic feet (2.32 m^{3}) per second

Basin features
- Tributaries
  - left: Alder Creek, High Valley Creek, Widow Creek
  - right: Jones Creek, Houghton Creek, Sulphur Creek, Sweetwater Creek

Kelsey Creek is a watercourse in Lake County, California, United States, that feeds Clear Lake from the south. Originally forest-covered, the watershed has been converted in the lower parts to farmland and for urban use. Higher up, the forests have been cleared, regrown, and cleared again. The northern part of the creek flows through a geothermal field that feeds power plants and hot springs. The wooded Cobb area in the higher part of the watershed was once home to resorts as early as the 1850s.

== Name ==
The creek takes its current name from Andrew Kelsey, one of the first Anglo-American settlers in Lake County. Kelsey was killed in 1849 in an uprising against him by Wappo and Eastern Pomo Indians he had enslaved. This episode led to the Bloody Island Massacre on an island in Clear Lake. Until the 1870s, "Kelsey Creek" was also commonly used to designate the general area that would eventually be officially become Kelseyville. It was also the name of a school district until 1920.

Its Pomo name is chi-bedame ("hitch creek"), after the Clear Lake hitch (chi in Pomoan language), a threatened cyprinid fish which still spawns in the creek (bedame is Pomo for "small stream").

== Course ==
Kelsey Creek is about 22.5 miles (36.2 km) long. It forms on Cobb Mountain at 3,840 feet (1,170 m) above sea level and drops to 1,318 feet (402 m) at Clear Lake. It flows in a northwest direction through the mountains to Big Valley, then flows north to the lake, which it enters through Clear Lake State Park. At its mouth it is called Kelsey Slough. Kelseyville is the largest community in the watershed, on the east side of Big Valley. The creek is the third largest watercourse flowing into Clear Lake. Between 1982 and 2005 stream flow near the creek's mouth averaged 81.9 cubic feet (2.32 m^{3}) per second.

The creek bed is fairly steep in the upper reaches and through the canyons, flattening out in the plains that open to Big Valley. Upstream Kelsey Creek and tributaries such as Lee Creek, Jones Creek and Alder Creek flow year round. Downstream, the section of Kelsey Creek from Main Street Bridge in Kelseyville to the lake is usually dry in mid-summer. There are 15 feet (4.6 m) falls about 3.5 miles (5.6 km) below Glenbrook, and lower down there are 20 feet (6.1 m) falls about 3.3 miles (5.3 km) above the confluence with Sweetwater Creek. Fish cannot pass these falls.

== Geology ==
The region holds greywacke sandstone, chert and serpentinite rocks of the Franciscan Assemblage that have been highly sheared and faulted with ridges and valleys trending northwest–southeast. The area is seismically very active, but the earthquakes are low intensity. Landslides are very common throughout the upper part of the watershed, The Geysers area. In this area the soils are shallow loams and gravelly loams over bedrock, and are relatively infertile with low levels of nitrogen. They are vulnerable to erosion if disturbed by construction.

The watershed of the creek covers 28,614 acres (11,580 ha) in Lake County. It is a narrow corridor that runs northwest through the Northern California Coast Ranges into Big Valley, a flat region south of the western part of Clear Lake. It is about 10% of the Clear Lake watershed, and contributes about 16% of the water flowing into the lake. The highest point is the summit of Cobb Mountain at 4,722 feet (1,439 m) above sea level, and the lowest area is the flat farmlands of Big Valley beside Clear Lake at 1,318 feet (402 m) above sea level.

=== Geothermal field ===
The Geysers geothermal field includes the upper Kelsey Creek Watershed, as well as parts of Lake and Sonoma counties to the south. From the 1850s hot spring resorts to the east of the upper Kelsey Creek began to attract visitors. The first viable geothermal power plant was developed in 1956. As of 2010 there were about sixty active geothermal wells in the watershed. A 1981 report noted that geothermal plants in the Kelsey Creek area were causing air quality problems through hydrogen sulfide emissions. Construction of roads and drill pads opens large areas of soil to erosion by heavy rains, washing into the creek's tributaries and degrading water quality. The power plants also interfere with activities such as hunting, fishing and general recreation.

== Ecology ==
Annual precipitation in the upper part ranges from 25 to 80 inches (640 to 2,030 mm), with highest rainfall along the crest of the Mayacamas Mountains. At one time valley oak woodlands may have covered most of Big Valley, and some remnants of these woodlands remain near the shores of the lake and along watercourses. Better roads in the early 20th century led to an increase in production of walnuts, pears and grapes, mainly in the flat part of Big Valley. Most of Big Valley is now used for agriculture or is urbanized.

South of Big Valley in the higher country, the main vegetation is blue oak woodlands, gray pines and annual grasslands. Above about 2,000 feet (610 m) the main land cover is chaparral, with patches of California live oak woodlands on the higher ridges. The upper end of the watershed has soils of volcanic materials, with conifer or hardwood-conifer forests. The Cobb area's resort and residential communities lie within these forests.

Kelsey Creek is host to the Clear Lake hitch, a threatened species which was once a staple of the local Native American populations and only found in Clear Lake in its tributaries. Invasive and introduced species such as catfish, bass and carp into Clear Lake, as well as historically low creek water levels and diversions are also believed to have contributed to the hitch's population decline.

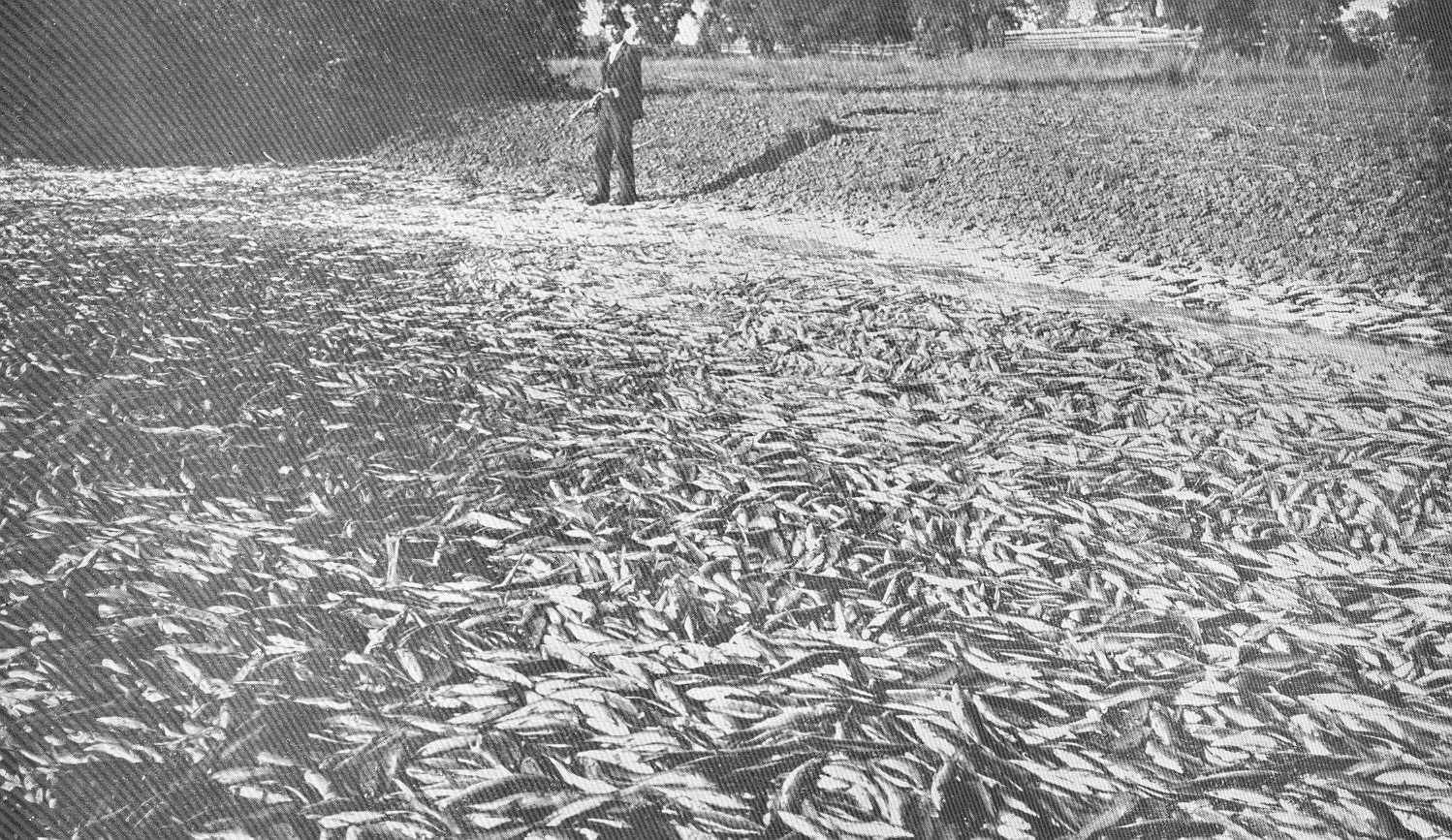
1907. Sacramento pikeminnow stranded after spawning in Kelsey Creek when the water level dropped after a rain.

As of March 2024, farming operations along the Big Valley Groundwater Basin watershed (which includes Kelsey Creek and its Cole Creek tributary) have been ordered to report of their water use by the California State Water Resources Control Board in order to study the effect of groundwater pumping and water diversions on the Clear Lake hitch spawning and migration.

The Clear Lake splittail (Pogonichthys ciscoides), which once also swam in Kelsey Creek, has not been observed since the 1970s. According to a Pomo elder, chi and hitch are both Pomo words, chi describing the hitch, and hitch was used to describe the Clear Lake splittail. The Sacramento pikeminnow (Ptychocheilus grandis) and the Sacramento sucker (Catostomus occidentalis), both native fish, were last observed in the 1970s.

The rainbow trout (Oncorhynchus mykiss), native to Clear Lake, seems to have been introduced in the upper section of Kelsey Creek after the arrival of white settlers, and several fisheries developed in the area. Before 1955, the Department of Fish and Game also introduced the non-native brown trout in the stream.

== Tributaries ==
Stream	GNIS id	Parent	Mouth			Length	
Stream	GNIS id	Parent	Coords	Elev ft	Elev m	mi	km
Kelsey Creek	262116	Clear Lake	39°01′14″N 122°48′58″W	1,329	405	22	35
←Jones Creek	226332	Kelsey Creek	38°49′16″N 122°43′04″W	2,529	771	1.5	2.4
←Houghton Creek	225685	Kelsey Creek	38°49′27″N 122°43′18″W	2,487	758	1.5	2.4
←Rush Creek	232020	Kelsey Creek	38°50′15″N 122°44′31″W	2,365	721	1	1.6
←Alder Creek (Kelsey Creek)	218088	Kelsey Creek	38°51′07″N 122°45′26″W	2,303	702	4	6.4
←←Lee Creek	226991	Alder Creek (Kelsey Creek)	38°49′51″N 122°45′33″W	2,582	787	2	3.2
←Sulphur Creek	235710	Kelsey Creek	38°51′22″N 122°45′45″W	2,277	694	2	3.2
←High Valley Creek	225284	Kelsey Creek	38°52′08″N 122°47′36″W	2,218	676	4.5	7.2
←Sweetwater Creek	235896	Kelsey Creek	38°54′19″N 122°51′10″W	1,535	468	4.25	6.84
←Widow Creek	237728	Kelsey Creek	38°54′30″N 122°51′28″W	1,526	465	1.5	2.4
←Cole Creek	258583	Kelsey Creek	39°01′04″N 122°48′55″W	1,332	406	1.5	2.4

== Lumber ==
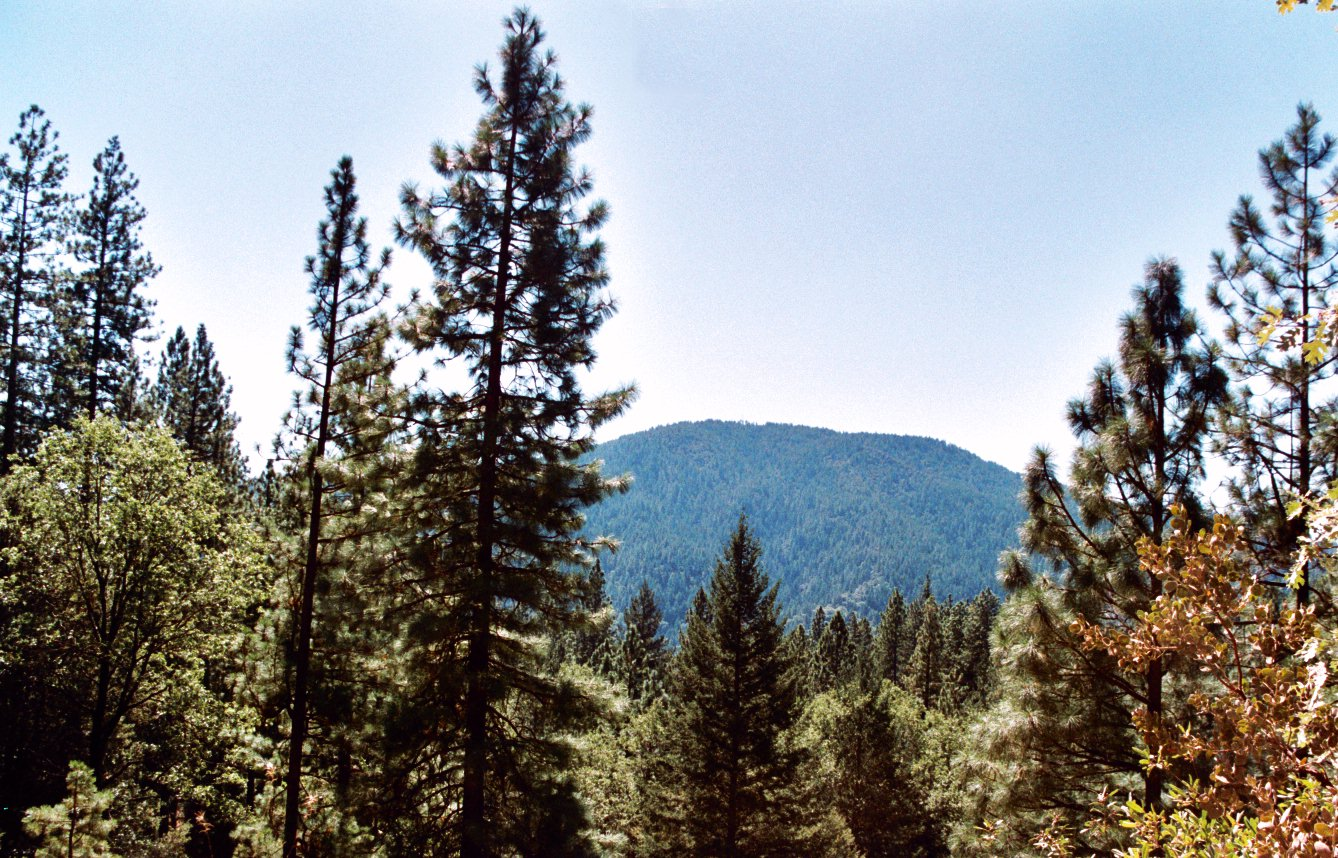
Cobb Mountain view from Boggs Mountain

In 1856 John Cobb opened the first sawmill along Kelsey Creek in Cobb Valley. Lumber was needed for underground supports in the borax mine at Borax Lake, north of Clearlake, and in the Sulphur Bank Mine. Wood was also needed for the mines' reducing furnaces. Most of this came from the volcanic uplands of Kelsey Creek and neighboring watersheds. By the end of the 19th century most of the prime timber in the Boggs Mountain area had been cleared, and the land was mainly being used for pasturage rather than timber. After World War II (1939–1945) there was a boom in construction, and all the usable old-growth and secondary forest was clear cut. The state bought the land for the Boggs Mountain Demonstration State Forest for just $38,700 because it held no timber of commercial value.

== Tourism ==
In the 1850s, people from the San Francisco Bay Area and the Central Valley began to vacation in resorts in the Kelsey Creek area. The Glenbrook Resort was a stage stop between the Bay Area and Clear Lake, with resorts both north and south of Glenbrook. Road improvements in the 1910s and 1920s resulted in new resorts being opened along the roads. In the early 1920s, Jim McCauley established a resort on the creek between Cobb and Whispering Pines, west of his Boggs Mountain property. It was originally named Camp Calso but renamed to Forest Lake Resort in 1938. McCauley dammed a tributary of Kelsey Creek to create Lake McCauley in 1935.

== See also ==
- Rivers of Lake County, California

== Sources ==
- Clear Lake State Park, State of California
- Key, Karen (24 September 2006), "Bloody Island (Bo-no-po-ti)", The Historical Marker Database, archived from the original on 7 November 2007
- 1870 Federal Census, Lake County, California - Kelsey Creek, 1870
- Durham, David L. (1998), California's Geographic Names: A Gazetteer of Historic and Modern Names of the State, Clovis, Calif.: Word Dancer Press, p. 87, ISBN 1-884995-14-4
- Barrett, Samuel Alfred (1908). The Ethno-Geography of the Pomo and Neighboring Indians (PDF). Vol. 36. University of California Publications in American Archeology and Ethnology.
- Kniffen, Fred B. (1939). Pomo Geography (PDF). Vol. 36. University of California Publications in American Archeology and Ethnology.
- De Palma-Dow, Angela (December 26, 2022). "Lady of the Lake: Merry Fishmas". Lake County News.
- Larson, Elizabeth (December 9, 2012). "Saving the Clear Lake hitch: Workshop explains complex factors affecting threatened native fish". Lake County News.
- Information Order and Reporting Requirements for the Clear Lake Watershed, California Water Resources Control Board
- Hoberg, Donna (2007). Resorts of Lake County. Arcadia Publishing. ISBN 9780738547985.
- Lundquist, Erica (February 2010), Kelsey Creek Watershed Assessment, Big Valley Watershed Council
- Ukiah District Office (1981), Draft Environmental Assessment, Kelsey Creek Proposed Geothermal Leasing, U.S. Department of the Interior, Bureau of Land Management
- "Way: Kelsey Creek (460390165)", OpenStreetMap
