= NCPA =

NCPA may refer to:

== Arts, entertainment, and media ==
- National Centre for the Performing Arts (China)
- National Centre for the Performing Arts (India)

== Other uses ==
- Northern California Power Agency
- National Center for Policy Analysis
- National Collegiate Pickleball Association
- National Conference of Police Associations, the precursor organization to the International Union of Police Associations
