= Glenbrook, Lake County, California =

Glenbrook
- former resort
- Location in California Glenbrook (the United States)
- Coordinates: 38°51′06″N 122°45′31″W
- Country: United States
- State: California
- County: Lake County
- Elevation: 2,293 ft (699 m)

Glenbrook (formerly Glenbrook Resort) was a resort in Lake County, California. It was located 10 miles (16 km) south-southeast of Kelseyville, at an elevation of 2293 feet (699 m).

== Resort history ==
Unlike many other such resorts, Glenbrook was not constructed around one of California's many hot springs, but rather grew up as a stage stop on the road between Middletown and Lakeport in the late 19th century. Glenbrook Resort was near the point where Bottle Rock Road crossed Kelsey Creek. It was a stage stop between the San Francisco Bay Area to the south and Clear Lake to the north. There were other resorts to the north and south of Glenbrook.

William Basset and Silas Broadwell built stock buildings, a stage station, and houses after buying the land in 1869, and a 200-strong community grew up around the stop that included a blacksmith, lumber dealers and manufacturers, a stock raiser, fruit growers, a meat market, and a hotel. Initially Basset was the proprietor of the resort, and also the local post master, a post office operating there from 1877 to 1911, when it moved to Cobb and the stage started taking another road to Lakeport. Basset had come to Lake County with his parents in July 1858, the family having been farmers in Sonoma County from 1856 and in Tehama County from October 1853, where they had first arrived in California from Ohio, the state of Basset's birth on 1842-02-04.

In 1900 the resort was operated by Orvis Tredway. An advertisement from 1899, when O.W.R. Tredway was owner, noted the main hotel and cottages were now lighted with acetylene gas. Amusements of all kinds included billiards, tennis and a new dancing pavilion. Another advertisement by Tredway called it "one of the most charming resorts in the State. Fine scenery, hunting and fishing; excellent table." Later the resort was operated by George and Sadie Farley.

== Later usage ==
The property, no longer a resort, was purchased in 1953 by husband and wife, Ralph and Anna Rumbaugh. They lived at the property with their two children and Ralph's uncle, Clarence Spornhauer, and enjoyed the beauty of the area. (Information added by a living member of the Rumbaugh family.) Then, in 1958 they sold the property to husband and wife Alfred J. and Opal R. Tantarelli. A February 1980 list of natural fumarole activity in The Geysers geothermal region listed Tantarelli Springs at Glenn Brook off Bottle Rock Road. A 2007 book said that Glenbrook's campgrounds and buildings had disappeared, the site now being the location of Pine Grove, a local business. As of 2021 Mandala Springs Wellness Retreat Center, at the junction of Glenbrook Road and Bottle Rock Road, appeared to claim Glenbrook Resort as the prior occupant of their site.

== Glenbrook area ==
Astorg Spring (also called Tunnel Spring) is located 1 mile (1.6 km) southeast of Glenbrook, and was discovered when digging a mine. Called "chemise water", because of a taste that people compared to chemise brush roots, water from this disused mining shaft was sent by tanker to San Francisco for carbonation and distribution to the public. The California Department of Water Resources originally owned the Bottle Rock Power Plant near Glenbrook. Sulphur Creek Spring is also near Glenbrook. The Glenbrook Cemetery District serves the Cobb Valley Region.

== Sources ==
- Durham, David L. (1998). California's Geographic Names: A Gazetteer of Historic and Modern Names of the State. Clovis, California: Word Dancer Press. p. 66. ISBN 1-884995-14-4.
- "Glenbrook". Geographic Names Information System. United States Geological Survey, United States Department of the Interior.
- GRIPS Commission (June 1980), Comprehansive Air Monitoring Plan for the Geysers Geothermal Region of California, California Energy Commission
- Hinds, Alex (May 1989), Cobb Mountain Area Plan (PDF) (draft), Lake County Planning Department, archived from the original (PDF) on 2021-04-23
- Hoberg, Donna (2007). Resorts of Lake County. Arcadia Publishing. ISBN 9780738547985.
- Mandala Springs History, Mandala Springs
- Lundquist, Erica (February 2010), Kelsey Creek Watershed Assessment (PDF), Big Valley Watershed Council, archived from the original (PDF) on 2021-04-22
- Palmer, Lyman L. (1881). "Bassett, William D.". History of Napa and Lake counties. San Francisco: Slocum, Bowen, and Company.
- Tredway, O.W.R. (21 Jun 1899), "Glenbrook, Lake County", San Francisco Chronicle, San Francisco, California
