= Clear Lake State Park (California) =

State park in California, United States

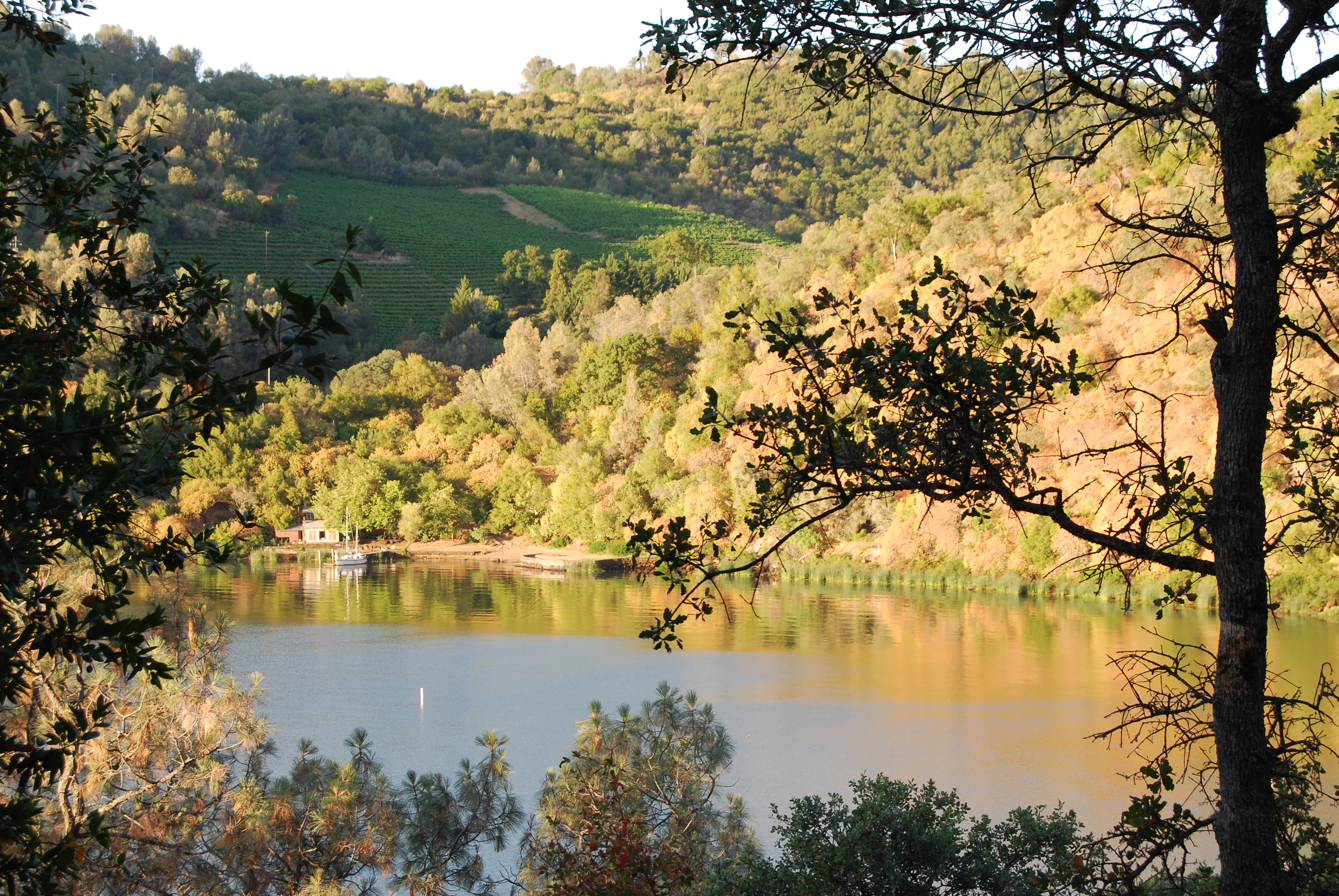
- Dorn Bay of Clear Lake as seen from Clear Lake State Park

- Location within California Location within the United States
- Location: Lake County, California, United States
- Nearest city: Kelseyville, California
- Coordinates: 39°0′36″N 122°48′32″W
- Area: 590 acres (240 ha)
- Established: 1949
- Governing body: California Department of Parks and Recreation

Clear Lake State Park is a state park of California, United States, on Clear Lake. The park is popular for water recreation. Amenities include 149 developed campsites spread across four campground areas, two group campsites, a swimming beach with showers, a boat launch, and a marina. Since the area is a major breeding ground for grebes, there's a broad "no wake" zone in the Cole Creek launch area and near the reedy shoreline, which is conducive to canoeing and kayaking. The 590-acre (240 ha) park was established in 1949.

== Proposed for closure ==
Clear Lake State Park was one of the 48 California state parks proposed for closure in January 2008 and again in Fall 2009, as part of a deficit reduction program. The state budget ultimately retained the parks as open, with austerity budgets.

== Campground ==
Clear Lake State Park has four campgrounds: Cole Creek, Kelsey Creek, Lower Bayview, and Upper Bayview. All sites can fit campers/trailers but offer no hookups. Each campsite has a fire ring, table, food storage box and restroom facilities with pay showers nearby, some sites feature water access to either Clear Lake, Kelsey Slough or Cole Creek. Clear Lake State Park also offers cabin rentals, hiking trails, and a visitor center with displays on the area’s natural and cultural history.

== See also ==
- List of California state parks
