= Loch Lomond, California =

Unincorporated community in California, United States

- Unincorporated community
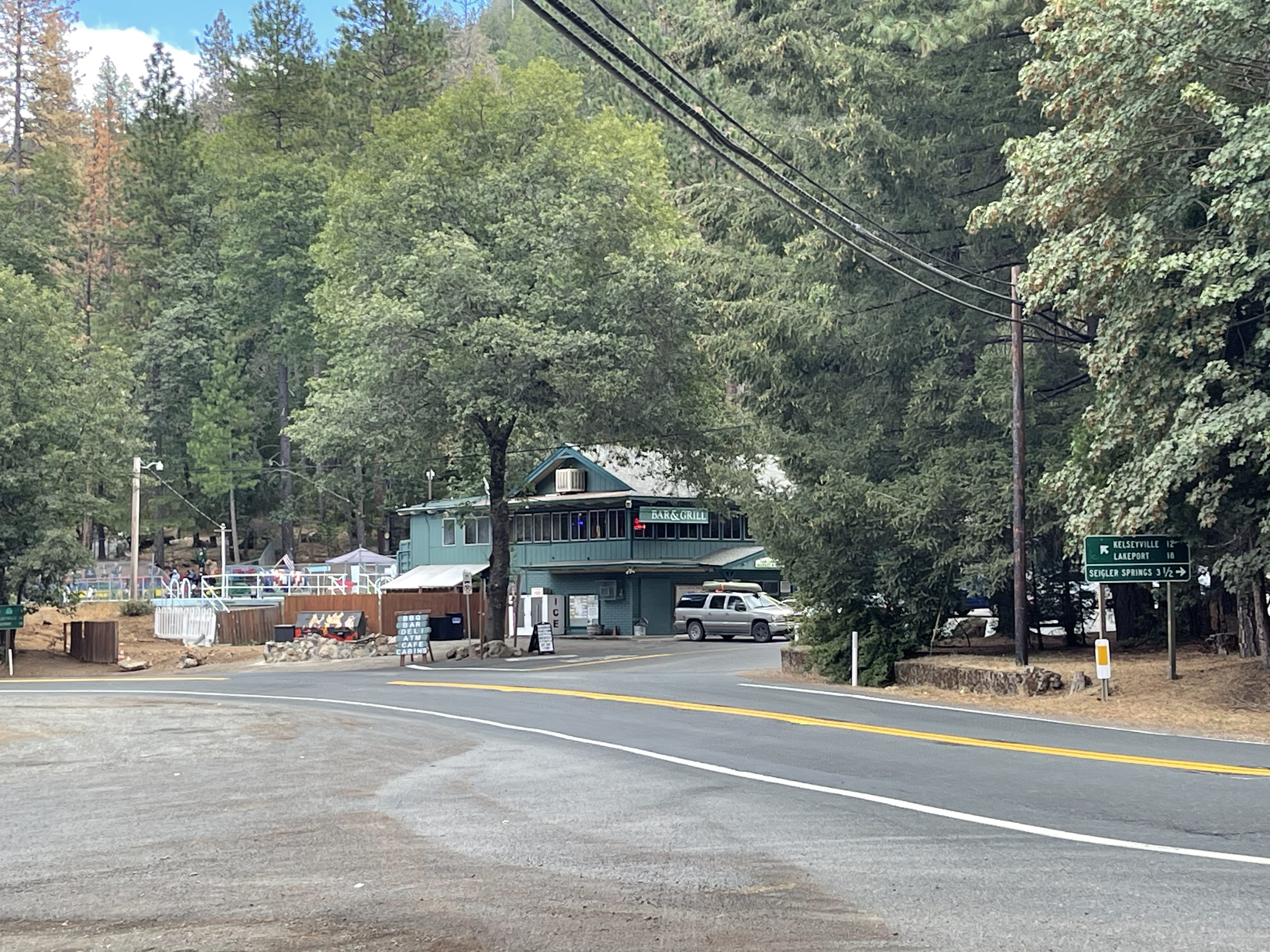
- Loch Lomond in September 2023.

- Location in California Loch Lomond, California (the United States)
- Coordinates: 38°51′48″N 122°43′10″W
- Country: United States
- State: California
- County: Lake
- Elevation: 2,818 ft (859 m)

Loch Lomond is an unincorporated community in Lake County, California, United States. It lies at an elevation of 2,818 feet (859 m). It is located on State Route 175, north of the village of Cobb; 3.5 miles (5.6 km) north of Whispering Pines. The ZIP code is 95461, which is shared with Middletown. Unofficially, and perhaps incorrectly, 95426, which belongs to neighboring Cobb, California is often used. The community is inside area code 707.

== Description ==
Loch Lomond is a small mountain resort with a population of 420 and was called "Little Italy" many years ago. Private resorts such as Italian Village and Biggi's Family Club still thrive with summer activities. Visitors will find lodging, a private campground, plus a grocery store with deli, mailing services, Roadhouse restaurant and bar as well as Giovanni's coffee shop nearby.

On the west side of the highway is the Loch Lomond Vernal Pool Ecological Reserve, a vernal pond managed by the California Fish and Game.

== Government ==
In the California State Legislature, Loch Lomond is in the 2nd senatorial district, represented by Democrat Mike McGuire, and in the 4th Assembly district, represented by Democrat Cecilia Aguiar-Curry.

In the United States House of Representatives, Loch Lomond is in California's 5th congressional district, represented by Republican Tom McClintock.
