= Geothermal Energy Association =

Logo of the Geothermal Energy Association

The Geothermal Energy Association (GEA) was a U.S. trade organization composed of U.S. companies who support the expanded use of geothermal energy and are developing geothermal resources worldwide for electrical power generation and direct-heat uses. GEA advocated for public policies that will promote the development and utilization of geothermal resources, provides a forum for the industry to discuss issues and problems, encourages research and development to improve geothermal technologies, presents industry views to governmental organizations, provides assistance for the export of geothermal goods and services, compiles statistical data about the geothermal industry, and conducts education and outreach projects.

Headquartered in Washington, D.C., GEA represented the U.S. geothermal energy industry in congressional lobbying efforts, compiled and published data relating to geothermal installations and the state of the industry, represents the industry to the media and the general public, and hosts conferences and workshops for its member companies.

In 2018, the GEA merged with the Geothermal Rising (formerly Geothermal Resources Council), and no longer exists as a separate entity.

== See also ==
- Geothermal Resources Council
- American Council on Renewable Energy
- Geothermal electricity
- Geothermal energy in the United States
- List of notable renewable energy organizations
- Renewable energy in the United States
