= Cobb Mountain =

Mountain in California

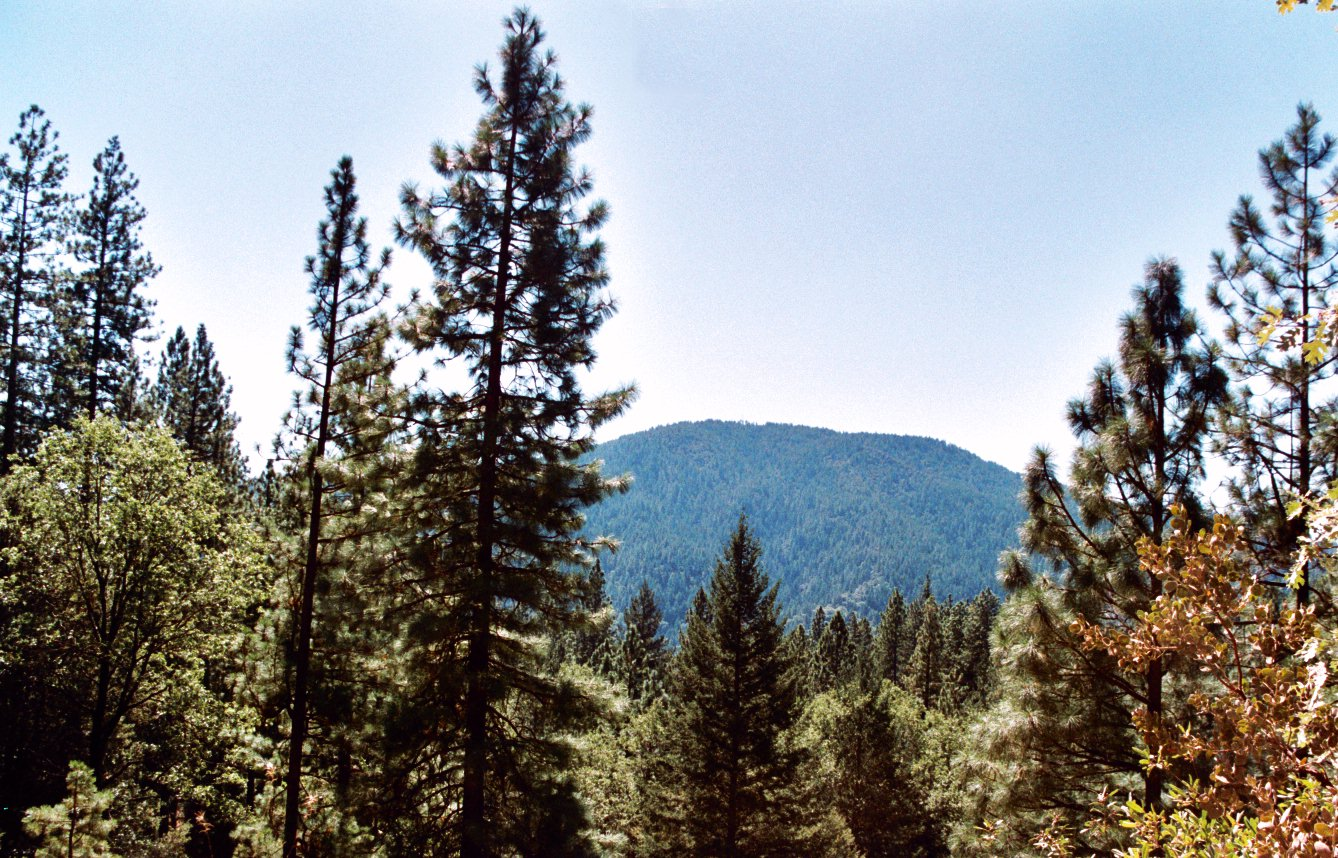

Highest point
- Elevation: 4723+ ft (1440+ m) NAVD 88
- Prominence: 3,160 ft (963 m)
- Parent peak: Crockett Peak
- Listing: California county high point 42nd
- Coordinates: 38°48′27″N 122°44′26″W

Geography
- Location within California Location within the United States
- Location: Lake County, California, U.S.
- Parent range: Mayacamas Mountains
- Topo map: USGS Whispering Pines

Geology
- Mountain type: Lava dome
- Volcanic field: Clear Lake volcanic field

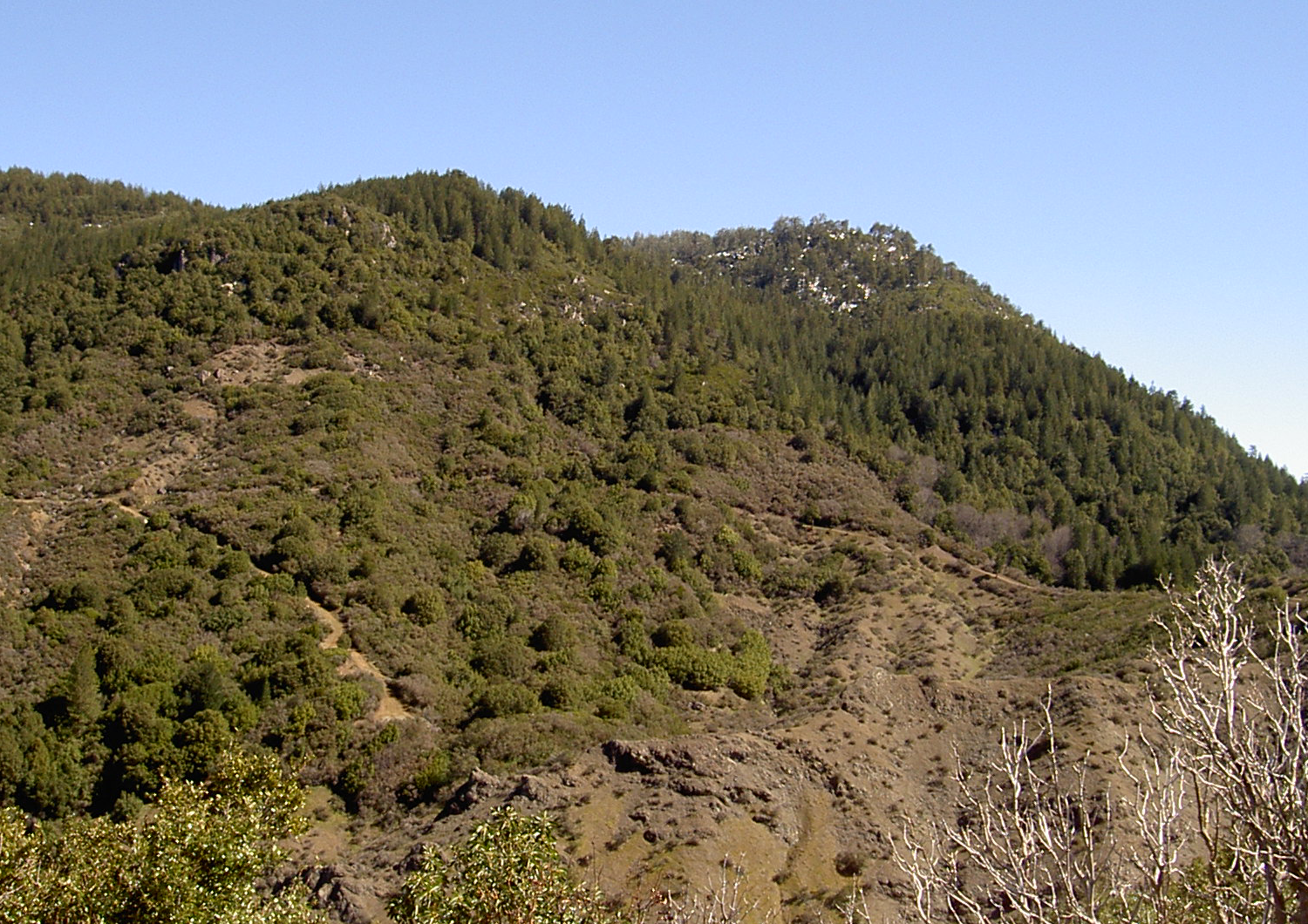
Southwest peak seen from the helipad to the south

Cobb Mountain is the tallest mountain in the Mayacamas Mountains of California.

== Location ==
Cobb Mountain's 4,723 feet (1,440 m) main summit is located in Lake County, west of the town of Cobb. Like nearby Mount Saint Helena, Cobb Mountain is tall enough to receive winter snowfall. The mountain has a sub-peak referred to as Cobb Mountain – Southwest Peak with an elevation of about 4483+ feet, (1367+ m) NAVD 88; Southwest Peak lies on the Sonoma-Lake county line and is the highest point in Sonoma County. Nearby taller peaks like Mount Saint Helena and Snow Mountain can be seen from this summit.

Cobb Mountain is one of the mountains in the Cobb Mountain Area, many of which have volcanic origin. Others are Boggs Mountain, Mount Hannah and Seigler Mountain. There are isolated small valleys and basins between the mountain peaks.

The east end of Cobb Mountain drains into the headwaters of Putah Creek, then into the Sacramento River, the San Francisco Bay, and the Pacific Ocean. The south slopes of Cobb Mountain drain into Anderson Creek, and thence into Putah Creek. The southwest slopes of Cobb Mountain drain into Cobb Creek, thence into Big Sulphur Creek, the Russian River, and into the Pacific. The northwest slopes of Cobb Mountain drain into Alder Creek, thence into Kelsey Creek, Clear Lake, Cache Creek, and the Sacramento River. The northeast slopes of Cobb Mountain drain into Kelsey Creek.

Much of Cobb Mountain lies within The Geysers Geothermal Field, and several geothermal plants are located on the mountain. Other areas on the mountain are owned by Cobb Mountain Spring Water (now sold as Mayacamas Mountain Spring Water) or are privately held timberlands. Because much of Cobb Mountain is privately owned, it is largely not accessible to the general public.

== History ==
The mountain is named after John Cobb, the first pioneer to settle in the area. Cobb was born in Henry County, Kentucky on May 19, 1814. In 1853 he arrived in California and homesteaded in Cobb Valley and went on to become the county assessor and the road overseer for the Clearlake District in 1855. He built a combined saw and gristmill in 1859, which was later destroyed by fire. He sold his interests and moved to Napa County around 1860.

The Cobb Mountain area was devastated in 2015 by the Valley Fire, including much of the town of Cobb, as well as several geothermal facilities. The catastrophic fire, the third-most destructive in California's history, started on Cobb Mountain as the result of faulty hot tub wiring according to Cal Fire. Four people died and a total 76,000 acres (31,000 ha) were burned over.

== Sources ==
- Lake County Planning Department (May 1989), Cobb Mountain Area Plan (PDF) (Preliminary Draft), archived from the original (PDF) on April 23, 2021
