= Pine Grove, Lake County, California =

Unincorporated community in California, United States

Pine Grove
- resort
- Location in California Pine Grove (the United States)
- Coordinates: 38°49′42″N 122°43′52″W
- Country: United States
- State: California
- County: Lake
- Elevation: 2,520 ft (768 m)

Pine Grove is a resort in Lake County, California, United States. It is located 1.5 miles (2.4 km) northwest of Whispering Pines, at an elevation of 2,520 feet (768 m).
