= Calpine =

Large energy company in the U.S.

Calpine Corporation

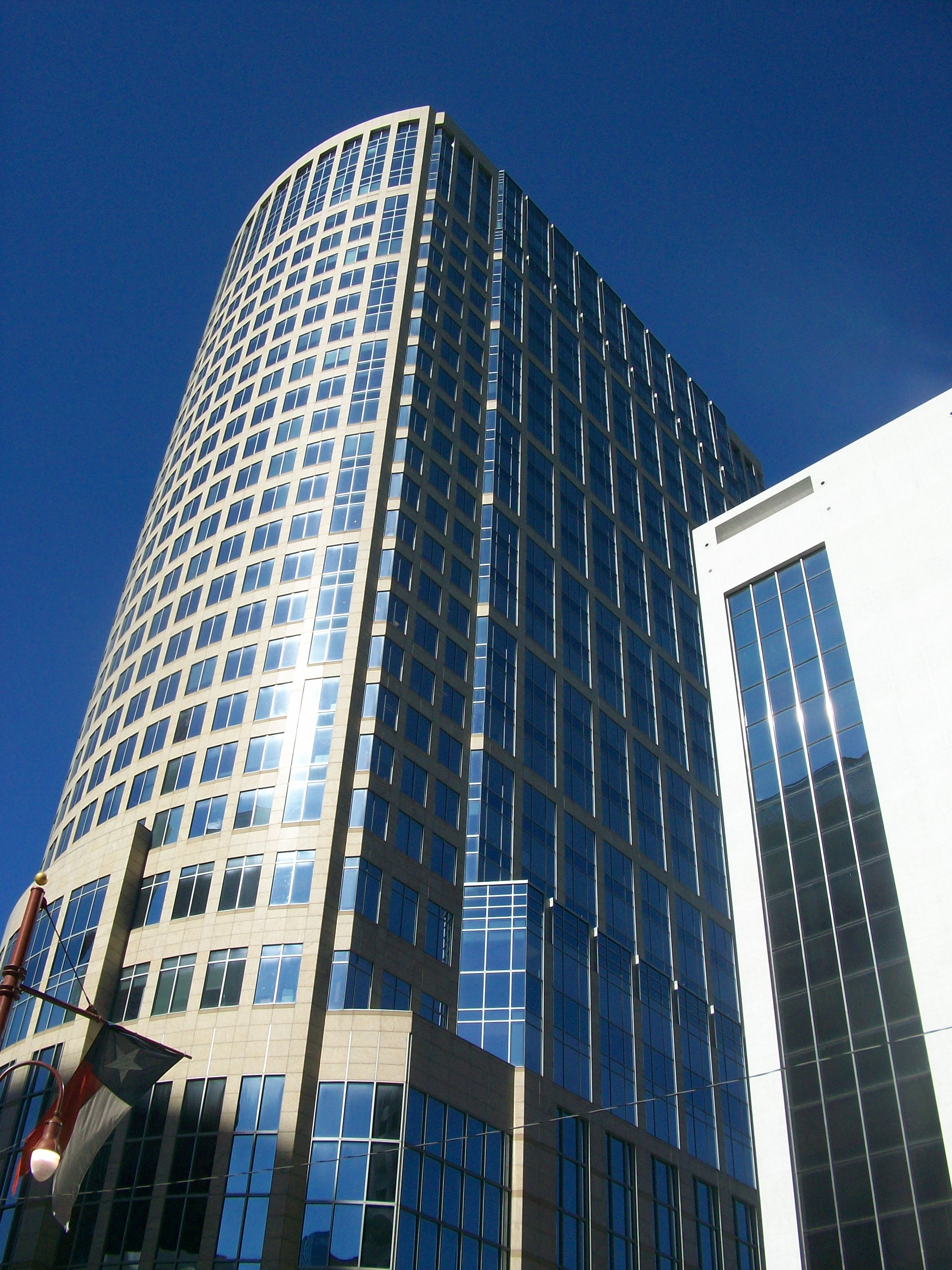
- Type: Private
- Industry: Energy
- Founded: 1984; 42 years ago
- Founder: Peter Cartwright
- Headquarters: Calpine Center; Houston, Texas, U.S.
- Key people: Andrew Novotny (CEO); Thad Miller (CFO)
- Revenue: ▲US$10.072 billion (2019)
- Net income: ▲US$770 million (2019)
- Total assets: US$16.062 billion (2018)
- Owner: Constellation Energy
- Number of employees: 2,256 (2019)
- Website: www.calpine.com

Calpine Corporation was a Fortune 500 company based in Houston, Texas. It was the largest generator of electricity from natural gas and geothermal energy in the United States, with operations in competitive power markets.

In January 2026, Constellation Energy announced it had completed its acquisition of Calpine for $16.4 billion and that Calpine would become a business unit of Constellation.

== Operations ==
Through wholesale power operations and its retail businesses, Calpine serves customers in 24 states, Canada, and Mexico. Its fleet of 80 power plants in operation or under construction has nearly 26,035 megawatts of generation capacity.

Having reported generating 100.8 million megawatt hours of electricity in 2019, the firm is the largest generator of electricity from natural gas and geothermal resources in the United States. In addition to its retail business, it is a merchant power plant operator that sells power to utilities at market rates.

=== Subsidiaries ===
==== Champion Energy ====
Champion Energy, a subsidiary of Calpine based in Houston, Texas, is a retail electricity provider that currently serves residential, governmental, commercial and industrial customers in deregulated electric energy markets in Texas, Illinois, Ohio, Pennsylvania, New Jersey and New York.

In addition, it also serves governmental, commercial and industrial customers in Delaware, Maryland and Washington, D.C.; and natural gas customers in Illinois.

=== Fleet ===
==== York Energy Center ====
York Energy Center is a 565-megawatt natural gas-fired power plant located in Peach Bottom Township, York County, Pennsylvania.

==== Metcalf Energy Center ====
The Metcalf Energy Center is a 605-megawatt combined cycle power plant located in Silicon Valley, in unincorporated Coyote Valley, south of San Jose, California and north of Morgan Hill, California. The plant is powered by natural gas. Some of the power generated by the plant is sent to far away places via Path 15, a major electrical power transmission corridor that is connected to the power plant.

==== The Geysers ====
The Geysers is the world's largest geothermal field, containing a complex of 15 geothermal power plants, drawing steam from more than 350 wells, located in the Mayacamas Mountains approximately 72 miles (116 km) north of San Francisco, California. Geysers produced about 20% of California's renewable energy in 2019.

Calpine owns 13 of the 15 geothermal plants at The Geysers. This group of 15 power plants is the largest producer of renewable geothermal power in North America, producing 725 megawatts of electricity, enough to power 725,000 homes or a city the size of San Francisco.

Despite the name of the steam field no natural geysers exist in or near The Geysers - Clear Lake area.

==== Los Medanos Energy Center ====
The Los Medanos Energy Center is a 561-megawatt natural gas fired co-generation power plant located in Pittsburg, California.

==== Edgemoor Power Generating Station ====
Edgemoor Power Generating Station in Wilmington, Delaware was acquired via the purchase of Connectiv from PEPCO in July 2010.

==== Russell City Energy Center ====
The Russell City Energy Center is a 619-megawatt natural gas-fired power station, which began operating in August 2013. It is located in Hayward, California.

The Russell City Energy Center is the nation’s first power plant to receive a federal air permit that includes a voluntary limit on greenhouse gas emissions.

== History ==
=== 1984–1999 ===
In 1984, Calpine was founded in Silicon Valley, California. Peter Cartwright and four of his co-workers, the Guy F. Atkinson Construction Company of South San Francisco, and the Electrowatt Corporation struck an investment arrangement. With initial capital of US$1 million, it was essentially a Silicon Valley startup company. In 1988, the first QF cogeneration plant was commissioned and power production began.

The name "Calpine" is derived from the company's original California location and alpine, a reference to the Zürich home base of Electrowatt. Electrowatt provided essential assistance when Calpine was a startup.

In 1988, the first QF cogeneration plant was commissioned and power production began. In 1992, the company's assets reached US$21 billion. In 1994, the company reached capacity output of 141 MegaWatts. In 1996, the company's initial public offering was the largest for an independent energy company.

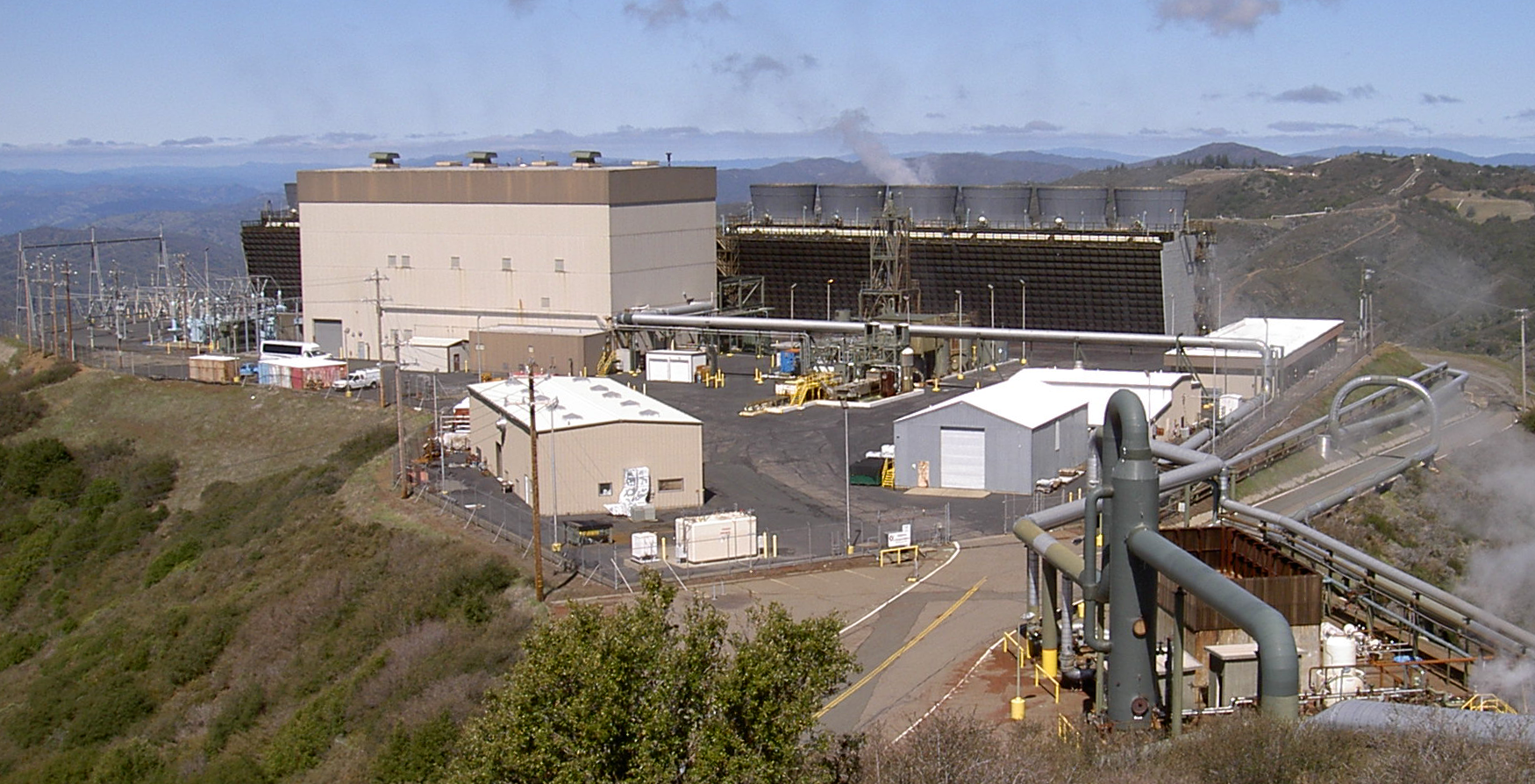
The Sonoma Calpine 3 geothermal power plant at The Geysers field in the Mayacamas Mountains of Sonoma County, California.

In 1999, Calpine bought PG&E's holdings at The Geysers, acquiring most of the geothermal complex. The Houston-based company operates 15 plants and produces about 725 megawatts.

=== 2000–2020 ===
In 2001, the California electric energy crisis occurred. In 2004, the investment bank Lehman Brothers begins shorting Calpine, with researcher Christine Daley lacking confidence in Calpine. This information spreads to clients of Lehman. By the time Calpine goes bankrupt in 2005, Lehman will profit roughly $100,000,000 from the short. In November 2005, CEO Peter Cartwright and CFO Bob Kelly resigned.

In 2004, Calpine purchased the Brazos Valley Power Plant in Texas for $175 million. At the time of sale, the natural gas combined cycle plant had a capacity of 570 megawatts.

In 2005, the founder and CEO of Calpine, Peter Cartwright, resigned amid severe financial problems for the company. Kenneth T. Derr was named acting CEO. Derr was a retired Chevron executive.

On January 31, 2008, Calpine emerged from bankruptcy protection. The company's previous stock was exchanged for warrants and new Calpine stock began trading on the NYSE under the ticker symbol "CPN". Later that year, a new management team, headed by president and CEO Jack Fusco, joined the company.

In 2010, Calpine bought the Conectiv Energy power plant fleet from Pepco for $1.65 billion. The deal included 18 operating plants and one plant that was under construction. The Conectiv acquisition provided access to markets in the Northeast.

In 2016, Calpine acquired Noble American Energy Solutions from Noble Group. Calpine paid roughly $800 million with an additional amount of roughly $100 million in net working capital paid at closing. The acquisition was funded with cash-on-hand and a one-year loan of about $550 million. The name of this business unit was changed to Calpine Energy Solutions.

In 2018, Calpine was acquired by an affiliate of Energy Capital Partners and a consortium of other investors including Access Industries and the Canada Pension Investment Board. A new board was appointed shortly after the acquisition. As Calpine became a private company its stock stopped trading prior to the opening of the New York Stock Exchange on March 9, 2018.

In 2019, Calpine sold its RockGen plant in Wisconsin to Starwood Energy.

=== 2021–present ===
In February 2023, Calpine released plans to begin development for a 425 MW natural gas-fired plant next to the Freestone Energy Center in Freestone County, Texas.

In July 2023, Calpine announced a $25 million carbon capture technology project. The technology could capture 95% of a plant’s carbon emissions, which would reduce greenhouse emissions. The technology was created by ION Clean Energy of Colorado.

In January 2025, Constellation Energy agreed to acquire Calpine for $16.4 billion ($26.6bn including debt) in a cash-and-stock deal. Exactly one year later, Constellation announced that it had completed the transaction.

In April 2025, ExxonMobil announced that it had reached an agreement with Calpine to carry away and store up to 2 million metric tons of carbon dioxide per year from Calpine's Baytown Energy Center near Houston. This agreement is part of a larger carbon capture and storage project at this site.

== See also ==
- Editors, World-Generation. Peter Cartwright. Retrieved February 10, 2006.
- Peters, Sara (2002). Calpine CEO shares wisdom, insight. Retrieved February 10, 2006.
- Schlager, Neil (2006). Peter Cartwright, 1930-. Retrieved February 10, 2006.
