= AltaRock Energy =

AltaRock Energy Inc. is a privately held corporation that focuses on the development of geothermal energy resources and enhanced geothermal systems (EGS). It is headquartered in Seattle, Washington and has a technology development office in Sausalito, California. AltaRock has filed patent applications and holds exclusive licenses for related intellectual property related to EGS. In 2008 it started its first project near The Geysers in California to demonstrate the ability of EGS to be a reliable, renewable, and clean source for the production of electric power.

AltaRock's efforts to expand EGS technologies have been encouraged by a 2006 Massachusetts Institute of Technology (MIT) report that concluded EGS has the potential to provide 100 GWe (gigawatts of electricity) or more for the U.S. by 2050.

Co-founded in 2007 by Andrew Perlman, Susan Petty, and other business partners, AltaRock has received backing from investors such as Google.org, Advanced Technology Ventures, and Vulcan Capital, as well as demonstration grant funding from the United States Department of Energy (DOE).

== Projects ==
=== The Newberry EGS Demonstration ===
The company currently has a demonstration project underway about 30 miles south of Bend, Oregon in the Deschutes National Forest. The Newberry EGS Demonstration is located on an existing Federal lease designated for geothermal use and is supported by a committee that includes representatives of the community, environmental groups, government, and the geothermal industry. AltaRock's Newberry EGS demonstration will create an EGS reservoir in the high-temperature, low-permeability rock present on the northwest flank of the Newberry Volcano. The demonstration will use hydraulic shearing (as opposed to hydraulic fracturing) and other drilling techniques to induce and sustain fluid flow and geothermal heat extraction, culminating in the conceptual design of a commercial-scale well field and power plant. Water usage and induced seismicity analyses for the demonstration site have been completed and conclude the project poses little risk to the area or to local communities.

=== The Geysers Demonstration ===
In 2008, AltaRock started a demonstration project at The Geysers geothermal field. The field has hundreds of megawatts of unused electric power generating capacity due to its lack of steam, caused by several decades of reservoir depletion. At The Geysers, AltaRock intended to re-drill a well originally drilled in 1988. Three attempts were made to re-drill the well from various depths, but the drilling assembly became stuck each time in an unstable serpentinite formation. Drilling at The Geysers demonstration site has been suspended while the company evaluates a number of alternative well locations at the Geysers and elsewhere for demonstrating this technology.

=== Blue Mountain ===
Opened in 2009, the under-performing Blue Mountain Faulkner 1 Geothermal Power Plant in the Black Rock Desert of Nevada was one of under 1,000 traditional geothermal energy sites remaining in the world in 2014. AltaRock Energy was originally hired by EIG Global Energy Partners in 2014 to help bring the site up to full capacity with its technology. In order to bring capacity at the site up to 50 megawatts, the company plans to first use hydroshearing possibly followed by drilling. Hydroshearing, a technology developed by AltaRock to improve the performance of existing geothermal wells, involves pumping cold water and particulate materials into an underground reservoir in order to block parts of the well and allow small cracks to form. The injected materials then degrade, allowing the new fractures to open up, which allow added water to flow and be used to generate steam, and thus energy. The Blue Mountain acquisition will test the viability of AltaRock's business model, which relies on raising revenue from upgrading existing geothermal sites in order to finance new EGS sites in the future. The company operated the site until 2025, when it was acquired by Ormat Technologies.
