= Northern California Power Agency =

The Northern California Power Agency, located in Roseville, California, is a joint powers agency formed in 1968 to provide its members with electrical energy purchasing, aggregation, scheduling and management. It coordinates with the California Independent System Operator.

As of 2022, the NCPA's 796 megawatt portfolio consisted of geothermal, hydroelectric, and natural gas power plants, which were 55% greenhouse gas emission-free.

In 2006, the NCPA began annual cloud seeding operations to increase precipitation, and as of 2022 was one of seven agencies in California that are running such programs.

== Members ==
As of September 2022:

- Alameda Municipal Power
- Bay Area Rapid Transit
- City of Biggs
- City of Gridley
- City of Healdsburg
- City of Lompoc
- City of Palo Alto
- City of Ukiah
- Lodi Electric Utility
- Port of Oakland
- Redding Electric Utility
- Roseville Electric
- Silicon Valley Power
- Truckee Donner PUD
- Plumas-Sierra Rural Electric Cooperative
- Shasta Lake
