= Geothermal Rising =

Non-profit association

- Abbreviation: GRC
- Predecessor: Geothermal Resources Council
- Formation: May 1971
- Founded at: Olympia, Washington, US
- Location: Palm Springs, California, US
- Members: 1,176 (2017)
- Official language: English, Spanish
- Executive Director: Bryant Jones
- Publication: GRC Bulletin
- Website: geothermal.org
- Formerly called: Geothermal Resources Council, Geothermal Energy Association

IMF25

Geothermal Rising (formally Geothermal Resources Council) is an international non-profit association of professionals in the field of geothermal energy. It is based in Davis, California. It was founded in Olympia in Washington state in May 1971, and its first conference was held in El Centro, California, in February 1972. It was incorporated in June of that year.

== See also ==
- Geothermal energy
- Geothermal exploration
- Geothermal power
