= Cobb, California =

- Census designated place
- Location within Lake County and the state of California
- Coordinates: 38°49′20″N 122°43′23″W
- Country: United States
- State: California
- County: Lake

Area
  - Total: 4.99 sq mi (12.92 km^{2})
  - Land: 4.98 sq mi (12.90 km^{2})
  - Water: 0.0077 sq mi (0.02 km^{2}) 0.17%
- Elevation: 2,631 ft (802 m)

Population (2020)
  - Total: 1,295
  - Density: 260.1/sq mi (100.41/km^{2})
- Time zone: UTC-8 (Pacific)
  - Summer (DST): UTC-7 (PDT)
- ZIP code: 95426
- Area code: 707
- FIPS code: 06-14302
- GNIS feature ID: 1658293

Cobb is a census designated place (CDP) in Lake County, California, United States. Cobb is located 1 mile (1.6 km) northwest of Whispering Pines, at an elevation of 2,631 feet (802 m). The population was 1,295 at the 2020 census, down from 1,778 at the 2010 census.

== History ==
The area is named for John Cobb, who settled in Cobb Valley in 1853. The first post office at Cobb opened in 1911.

=== 2015 fire ===
Many of the community's homes were destroyed in September 2015 by the Valley Fire.

== Geography ==
Cobb is located on State highway 175 at an elevation of 2,600 ft (790 m).

According to the United States Census Bureau, the CDP has a total area of 5.0 square miles (13 km^{2}), of which 99.83% is land and 0.17% is water. The ZIP code is 95426. Lake County borders Napa County to the southeast, Sonoma County to the southwest, Mendocino County to the west and northwest, Glenn County to the northeast and Colusa and Yolo counties to the east.

The Geysers Geothermal Field is located just south of Cobb.

=== Climate ===
This region experiences warm (but not hot) and dry summers, with no average monthly temperatures above 71.6 °F (22.0 °C). According to the Köppen Climate Classification system, Cobb has a warm-summer Mediterranean climate, abbreviated "Csb" on climate maps.

== Demographics ==
Historical population
Census	Pop.	Note	%±
1990	1,477		—
2000	1,638		10.9%
2010	1,778		8.5%
2020	1,295		−27.2%
U.S. Decennial Census; 1860–1870 1880-1890; 1900 1910 1920; 1930 1940 1950; 1960 1970 1980; 1990 2000 2010

=== 2020 census ===
As of the 2020 census, Cobb had a population of 1,295 and a population density of 260.0 inhabitants per square mile (100.4/km^{2}). The median age was 49.8 years. The age distribution was 255 people (19.7%) under the age of 18, 68 people (5.3%) aged 18 to 24, 269 people (20.8%) aged 25 to 44, 362 people (28.0%) aged 45 to 64, and 341 people (26.3%) who were 65 years of age or older. For every 100 females, there were 109.9 males, and for every 100 females age 18 and over, there were 114.4 males age 18 and over.

0.0% of residents lived in urban areas, while 100.0% lived in rural areas. The census reported that 1,284 people (99.2% of the population) lived in households, 11 (0.8%) lived in non-institutionalized group quarters, and no one was institutionalized.

There were 547 households, out of which 130 (23.8%) had children under the age of 18 living in them, 255 (46.6%) were married-couple households, 53 (9.7%) were cohabiting couple households, 113 (20.7%) had a female householder with no spouse or partner present, and 126 (23.0%) had a male householder with no spouse or partner present. Of all households, 159 (29.1%) were one person, and 76 (13.9%) were one person aged 65 or older. The average household size was 2.35. There were 343 families (62.7% of all households).

There were 689 housing units, of which 547 (79.4%) were occupied and 142 (20.6%) were vacant. Of the occupied units, 451 (82.4%) were owner-occupied and 96 (17.6%) were occupied by renters. The homeowner vacancy rate was 1.1% and the rental vacancy rate was 2.0%.

Racial composition as of the 2020 census
Race	Number	Percent
White	1,051	81.2%
Black or African American	6	0.5%
American Indian and Alaska Native	32	2.5%
Asian	9	0.7%
Native Hawaiian and Other Pacific Islander	0	0.0%
Some other race	36	2.8%
Two or more races	161	12.4%
Hispanic or Latino (of any race)	119	9.2%

=== Income and poverty ===
In 2023, the US Census Bureau estimated that the median household income was $113,375, and the per capita income was $47,930. About 0.0% of families and 6.7% of the population were below the poverty line.

=== 2010 census ===
The 2010 United States census reported that Cobb had a population of 1,778. The population density was 356.4 inhabitants per square mile (137.6/km^{2}). The racial makeup of Cobb was 1,625 (91.4%) White, 14 (0.8%) African American, 31 (1.7%) Native American, 13 (0.7%) Asian, 1 (0.1%) Pacific Islander, 26 (1.5%) from other races, and 68 (3.8%) from two or more races. Hispanic or Latino of any race were 113 persons (6.4%).

The Census reported that 1,778 people (100% of the population) lived in households, 0 (0%) lived in non-institutionalized group quarters, and 0 (0%) were institutionalized.

There were 789 households, out of which 179 (22.7%) had children under the age of 18 living in them, 422 (53.5%) were opposite-sex married couples living together, 65 (8.2%) had a female householder with no husband present, 39 (4.9%) had a male householder with no wife present. There were 46 (5.8%) unmarried opposite-sex partnerships, and 10 (1.3%) same-sex married couples or partnerships. 208 households (26.4%) were made up of individuals, and 70 (8.9%) had someone living alone who was 65 years of age or older. The average household size was 2.25. There were 526 families (66.7% of all households); the average family size was 2.68.

The population was spread out, with 305 people (17.2%) under the age of 18, 119 people (6.7%) aged 18 to 24, 337 people (19.0%) aged 25 to 44, 751 people (42.2%) aged 45 to 64, and 266 people (15.0%) who were 65 years of age or older. The median age was 50.1 years. For every 100 females, there were 105.1 males. For every 100 females age 18 and over, there were 106.9 males.

There were 1,064 housing units at an average density of 213.3 per square mile (82.4/km^{2}), of which 616 (78.1%) were owner-occupied, and 173 (21.9%) were occupied by renters. The homeowner vacancy rate was 3.4%; the rental vacancy rate was 8.9%. 1,369 people (77.0% of the population) lived in owner-occupied housing units and 409 people (23.0%) lived in rental housing units.

== Education ==
On November 20, 2009, Cobb School achieved a rare and coveted California State Award, "Cobb Mountain Elementary wins Governor’s Challenge Competition Award". Cobb Mountain Elementary has an Academic Performance Index score of 881, the county's highest API score for a school, according to state records. That most recent test was a 30-point improvement over the previous year. The award brings a $100k first prize for school for enrichment.

== Recreation ==
Cobb Mountain was a popular recreation area from the 1870s to 1970s. It is currently home to a handful of spiritual retreat centers, including The Mountain of Attention Meditation sanctuary of Adidam, and The Heart Consciousness Church Harbin Hot Springs. In 1971 Maharishi Mahesh Yogi (January 12, 1918 – February 5, 2008) introduced Transcendental Meditation (also known as TM) at a former popular resort called Hobergs. He renamed it The Capital of the Age of Enlightenment of Northern California and later The Maharishi Vedic School. Hobergs reopened in 2014 as Hoberg's Resort & Spa.

Cobb has two golf courses of 9 holes each: Cobb Mountain Golf and Adams Springs. The local Boggs Mountain Demonstration State Forest has almost 4,000 acres (16 km^{2}) for mountain biking, hunting, and hiking. There are several Inns, resorts, and Bed and Breakfast establishments, as well as a small shopping center with a grocery store, gas station, pizza restaurant, and coffee house.

== In popular culture ==
Highway 175 was mentioned as the next-to-last highway ridden in the classic book Zen and the Art of Motorcycle Maintenance by Robert Pirsig.

== Government ==
In the California State Legislature, Cobb is in the 2nd senatorial district, represented by Democrat Mike McGuire, and in the 4th Assembly district, represented by Democrat Cecilia Aguiar-Curry.

Federally, Cobb is in California's 4th congressional district, represented by Democrat Mike Thompson.

In the Lake County Board of Supervisors, Cobb is in District 5, represented by Jessica Pyska.
