= Whispering Pines, California =

Unincorporated community in California, United States

- Unincorporated community
- Location in California Whispering Pines, California (the United States)
- Coordinates: 38°48′49″N 122°42′45″W
- Country: United States
- State: California
- County: Lake
- Elevation: 2,667 ft (813 m)

Whispering Pines is an unincorporated community in Lake County, California, United States. It is located 8.5 miles (14 km) southwest of Lower Lake, at an elevation of 2641 feet (805 m). It is located south of Loch Lomond. The ZIP Code is 95461. The community is served by area code 707.

== History ==
Whispering Pines was established as a resort by the Strickler family in the 1930s. The family built most of the accommodations by themselves, including a spring-fed swimming pool and a store. A post office operated from the store from 1935 until 1962. Much of the community was destroyed by the Valley Fire in September, 2015.

== Government ==
In the California State Legislature, Whispering Pines is in the 2nd senatorial district, represented by Democrat Mike McGuire, and in the 4th Assembly district, represented by Democrat Cecilia Aguiar-Curry.

In the United States House of Representatives, Whispering Pines is in California's 5th congressional district, represented by Republican Tom McClintock.
