= New drilling technologies =

The study of Massachusetts Institute of Technology "The Future of Geothermal Energy – Impact of Enhanced Geothermal Systems (EGS) on the United States in the 21st Century" (2006) points out the essential importance of developing an economical deep geothermal boring technology. With old boring technologies, bore price rises exponentially with depth. Thus, finding a boring technology with which the bore price rise would be approximately linear with increasing bore depth is an important challenge.

== New drilling technologies requirements ==
This MIT study characterizes the requirements on new fast and ultra-deep boring technology as follows:

- the price of boring rises linearly with depth
- bore axis with neutral floating
- the possibility to make vertical or inclined bores up to 10 km deep
- the possibility to make large diameter bores – even 5 times larger than on the ground compared to today drilling technologies
- casing formed on site in the borehole

== Examples ==
There are more than 20 innovative drilling technology such as: laser, spallation, plasma, electron beam, pallets, enhanced rotary, electric spark and discharge, electric arc, water jet erosion, ultrasonic, chemical, induction, nuclear, forced flame explosive, turbine, high frequency, microwave, heating/cooling stress, electric current and several other. The most promising solutions are mentioned below:

1. Hydrothermal spallation – Thermal spallation drilling uses a large, downhole burner, much like a jet engine, to apply a high heat flux to the rock face. This drilling technology is based on thermal processes of rock spallation and fusion.
2. Chemical plasma – is based on crushing by high-speed combustion, but nitric acid as oxidizing agent instead of oxygen.
3. Erosion – most patents refer to water jet rock cutting. Different modification variants are described, e.g. utilization of cavitation, turbulent processes, combination with mechanical processes, etc.
4. Laser drilling – during the recent decade intense research has been made into utilization of high energy laser beams for rock disintegration. Primarily conversion of military equipment is concerned. Laser energy is used for the process of thermal spallation, melting, or evaporation of rock.
5. Electric discharge – The methods utilizing electric discharge are based on long-term experience gained in other application areas.
6. Electrical plasma – is based on crushing by irradiation of plasma with high temperature up to 20 000°C
7. Direct transfer of heat – This technology is based on electrically melting rock at 1400°C; lava gravel will float to top; bore hole walls are of glass of surrounding rock. Cost decreases with depth, with no limit on depth of bore hole. Bore diameters from 1m to 10m.
8. Gyrotron – Millimeter-wave microwaves are channeled using a waveguide to vaporize rock.

== High-energetic electrical plasma ==
One of the most promising approaches in deep drilling field is utilization of electrical plasma. It has lower energy efficiency than some other technologies, but it has several other advantages. Producing boreholes with wide range of diameters or drilling in water environment can be mentioned. The research team from Slovakia has developed drilling concept based on utilization of electrical plasma. The core of the research is held in Research Centre for Deep Drilling which was opened in the premises of Slovak Academy of Sciences. Only a very small number of companies have embraced this method, e.g. GA Drilling, headquartered in Bratislava, Slovakia.

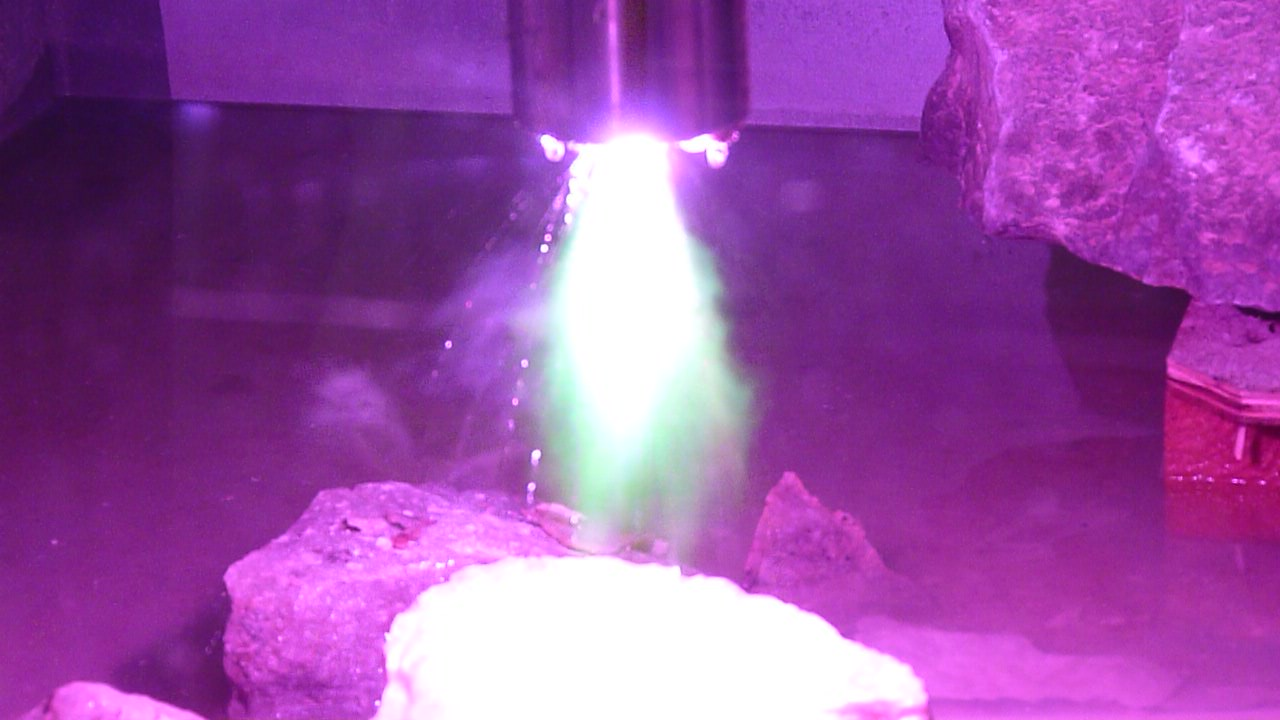
Plasmatorch using water steam as plasma-creation gas

=== Advantages of Plasma deep drilling technology ===
1. Higher drilling energy efficiency
2. Continuous drilling process without replacement of mechanical parts
3. Constant casing diameter
4. Effective transport of disintegrated rock

== State of the art ==
No one as of yet has proved the effective use of these techniques in severe conditions. Other complications including on site energy and material transport from 5 to 10 km bores also require refinement to become both technically and economically feasible.

== See also ==
- Plasma deep drilling technology
- Drilling rig
- Enhanced geothermal system
- Geothermal energy
- Oil well
- Geothermal Anywhere
- Quaise
