= Nabors Industries =

American oil and gas drilling contractor

Nabors Industries Limited
- Formerly: Anglo Company Limited
- Type: Public
- Traded as: NYSE: NBR
- Industry: Oil & Gas Drilling
- Founded: 1972; 54 years ago
- Headquarters: Hamilton, Bermuda (incorporation); Houston, Texas, U.S. (operational)
- Key people: Anthony G. Petrello, President & CEO; Miguel Rodriguez, CFO
- Revenue: ▲US $3.184 billion (2025)
- Net income: ▲US $287 million (2025)
- Total assets: ▲US $4.789 billion (2025)
- Total equity: ▲US $0.955 billion (2025)
- Number of employees: 13,900 (2025)
- Subsidiaries: Canrig Drilling Technology; Saudi Aramco Nabors Drilling Company (50%)
- Website: http://www.nabors.com

Nabors Industries Limited is an American global oil and gas drilling contractor based in Houston, Texas. Nabors owns the world's second largest land drilling rig fleet, with over 250 rigs operating in 20 countries.

== Predecessor companies ==
=== Anglo-Lautaro ===
Nabors Industries traces its history to the early 20th century and the Guggenheim family's business interests in South America. In 1924, the Guggenheims used the profits from the sale of their Chuquicamata copper properties to purchase the Anglo-Chilean Nitrate and Railways Company, a British business. They then formed a new Delaware corporation on 22 December 1924, the Anglo-Chilean Consolidated Nitrate Corporation Limited, which acquired all the assets of ACNRC. In 1929, they acquired another British nitrate business, the Lautaro Nitrate Company Limited, which had been founded in 1889. The family ran the companies separately until 1950, when they merged them into then Anglo-Lautaro Nitrate Corporation Limited. During the presidency of Salvador Allende, Chile nationalised its nitrate industry and the Guggenheims were forced to sell the assets of Anglo-Lautaro.

In 1971, the government paid $7,885,590 for Anglo-Lautaro, which resulted in a $25,912,956 loss for the company. Historian Irwin Unger summarised the family's nitrate operations, saying, "All told, the nitrate venture had been a disappointment, and it diminished the family's role in the world of business. The Guggenheims soon ceased to be industrial movers and shakers and became known to the public primarily as patrons of the arts and sciences."

=== Nabors Drilling ===
Nabors Drilling, based in Calgary, was founded as an Alberta corporation in May 1952 as the Parker Drilling Company of Canada Limited, a wholly owned subsidiary of the Parker Drilling Company. The American parent had been founded in Tulsa in 1934 by Gifford Cleveland Parker (1897–1967). By 1966 Clair Alson Nabors (1912–1993), originally of Texas, acquired control of the Canadian company and renamed it Nabors Drilling Limited.

== History of the company ==
=== Formation of the Anglo Company, 1972–1982 ===
After the demise of Anglo-Lautaro in 1971, the remnants of the business were reorganised into a new company, the Anglo Company Limited, incorporated in the Bahamas. Through the 1970s, Anglo's chairman Peter Lawson-Johnston (the son of Barbara Josephine Guggenheim) and president Albert C. Van de Maele (the husband of Joan Guggenheim) pursued an aggressive acquisitions program which included in 1974 a 52.4 percent stake in Nabors Drilling Limited. By 1978 Anglo had a 99 percent stake in Nabors. Other companies Anglo acquired included Minerec Corporation, Printex Corporation, Robert Garrett & Sons, and Motor Parts Industries. To finance the acquisition of the R. L. Manning Company, in May 1978 Anglo made a public offering of a new holding company, the Anglo Company Incorporated, a Delaware corporation. In 1981, Anglo Company Limited (Bahamas) and Anglo Company Incorporated (Delaware) became, respectively, Anglo Energy Limited and Anglo Energy Incorporated. Also, in 1981, Anglo sold Printex and entered the oil and gas exploration and production business via a partnership with the National Utilities and Industries Corporation. That year, Van de Maele retired and the William J. Johnson was appointed president.

=== Financial troubles, 1982–1988 ===
Shortly after Anglo had begun work in oil exploration, the 1980s oil glut began. In 1982 the company reduced its staff from 2,500 to 1,000, reported a quarterly loss of $7.8 million in September, and at year-end showed earnings of only $444,000 compared to $27 million the previous year. In 1983 the share value hit $6 after a 1981 high of $35, and in the first quarter lost $41 million. Only two years after he had assumed the presidency, Johnson stepped down and was replaced by Allen F. Rhodes. During 1983 Anglo abandoned its exploration and production activities and sold two-thirds of its oil field supply equipment. In November of that year the company filed for Chapter 11 bankruptcy. During its bankruptcy, Anglo's subsidiaries continued to operate. In August 1986 the company was restructured, Richard A. Stratton was appointed president, and in 1987 Eugene M. Isenberg was elected chairman. Anglo continued to lose heavily and in 1987 reported losses of $85.9 million against profits of $28.6 million. In February 1988 the company again filed for Chapter 11 protection. That March it sold the assets of the R. L. Manning Company and in May restructured and emerged from bankruptcy.

=== Emergence as a drilling power, 1988–2014 ===
After emerging in May 1988 from Chapter 11, that November it purchased the Westburne Group, a major Canadian drilling and supply company. To reflect the centrality of its drilling operations, on 9 March 1989 Anglo Energy Limited and Anglo Energy Incorporated became Nabors Industries Limited (Bahamas) and Nabors Industries Incorporated (Delaware).

In 1990, Nabors acquired Loffland Brothers Drilling for $58 million. This provided Nabors a further 53 rigs. Same year, company opened its corporate headquarters building in Houston, Texas.

On October 1, 1991, Anthony G. Petrello was hired and became deputy chairman, President and Chief Operating Officer of Nabors Industries. Previously, he had the role of Managing Partner of the New York Office of law firm Baker & McKenzie.

In 1993, Nabors performed the acquisition of Grace Drilling, the largest drilling rig fleet in the world at that time, for $32 million, adding 167 rigs to the company fleet. In 1997, Nabors performed multiple acquisitions that expanded the company - Canrig acquisition put Nabors into drilling equipment business, Sundowner purchase exposed company presence in offshore drilling and Epoch Well Services acquisition expanded Nabors to the instrumentation market. During the late 1990s, Nabors Industries continued to grow its domestic and international operations, and was added to the S&P 500 Index of the largest publicly traded companies in the United States. The stock moved from the AMEX to the NYSE.

In 2007, Nabors Industries sold its Sea Mar Fleet for US$189 million in cash to Hornbeck Offshore Services, including 20 offshore supply vessels (OSVs). The deal closed in early August 2007.

In 2010, Nabors purchased Superior Well Services company in a $736 million deal and entered the completion & production services market.

In October 2011, Nabors CEO Eugene M. Isenberg stepped down from his position and was replaced by Anthony G. Petrello. In June 2012, Petrello became the CEO and chairman of the board of directors of the company.

In 2013, Nabors deployed a new generation of pad-optimal rigs for the U.S. land market, including the PACE®-X800 Nabors SmartRig with advanced walking capabilities for multi-well pad drilling.

=== Modern history, 2015-present ===
In 2015, Nabors exited the completions & production business the following year to focus on drilling & technology. Following that, Nabors created a new division called Nabors Drilling Solutions (NDS) with focus on automation of managed pressure drilling, casing running and directional drilling.

In 2015, Nabors created a joint venture with KazMunayGas in Kazakhstan to transfer drilling operations performed at the Tengiz Field from Tengizchevroil to the joint venture, "KMG Nabors Drilling Company".

On October 31, 2016, Nabors Industries signed a contract with Saudi Aramco, largest oil company in the world, to form a joint venture named SANAD (Saudi Aramco Nabors Drilling Company). SANAD commenced operations on December 1, 2017.

On August 14, 2017, Nabors agreed to acquire Tesco Corporation in an all-stock transaction for $216 million. The acquisition was completed on December 15, 2017.

In August 2017, Nabors announced the acquisition of Robotic Drilling Systems (RDS) from a Norway-based drilling company, Odfjell Drilling.

In October 2018, Nabors acquired PetroMar Technologies, a company that offers a pipeline of innovative products strategically positioned to address the needs of unconventional oil and gas exploration.

Since 2021, Nabors has been engaged in energy transition ventures, primarily through its investments in various startup companies in geothermal, energy storage and concentrated solar thermal power industries. Some of the notable investments include GA Drilling, Quaise and Natron Energy.

In October 2024, Nabors announced an acquisition of Parker Wellbore, the leading rental provider for downhole tubulars in the US market. Nabors acquired all of Parker's issued and outstanding common shares in exchange for 4.8 million shares of Nabors common stock. Acquisition was completed in March 2025.

In August 2025, Nabors Industries announced the sale of Quail Tools to Superior Energy Services for $600 million, which generated an after-tax gain of $314 million. As a result, Nabors Industries returned to profitability in 2025, reporting an annual net income of $287 million.

== Leadership ==
=== President ===
1. Albert C. Van de Maele, 1972–1981
2. William J. Johnson, 1981–1983
3. Allen F. Rhodes, 1983–1986
4. Richard A. Stratton, 1986–1992
5. Anthony G. Petrello, 1992–present

=== Chairman of the board ===
1. Peter Lawson-Johnston, 1972–1986
2. Eugene M. Isenberg, 1987–2011
3. Anthony G. Petrello, 2011–present

== See also ==
- List of oilfield service companies
