= Underground rocket =

An underground rocket or rocket drill is a device for rapidly drilling holes through soil and rock of varying composition at rates up to 1 metre per second by utilising supersonic jets of hot gases. It was developed by Russian engineer Mikhail Tsiferov in 1948.

Proposed uses for the device included drilling shallow holes for mineral exploration, construction, underground gasification of coal, water and methane drainage.

The initial design called for an autonomous device equipped with a drill head that would be rotated by expanding gases generated by a propellant burning inside a combustion chamber, in a manner similar to a Segner wheel. As the hot gases escaped the slits in the drill head at high speeds, they would break down the ground in front of the device. Experiments have shown the device could achieve drilling speed of 5 metres per minute through solid rock and up to 100 metres per minute in soil. In 1970, Soviet geologist Vladimir Smirnov said, the device "may well bring about a revolution in the facilities for penetrating the interior of the earth". While a number of experimental prototypes were made and tested, the device has not seen production.

== Prototype ==
Further development led to the first prototype, built in 1968. The device consisted of a cylindrical shell filled with solid propellant, with a number of de Laval nozzles installed in the nose cone. The rocket was positioned nose down and the propellant ignited; hot gases escaped through the nozzles at supersonic speeds. Nozzles aimed downwards were responsible for demolition of the ground underneath the rocket; the next series of nozzles, aimed sideways, expanded the drilled well. Gas escaped between the device's shell and the walls of the well at speeds of up to 100 m/s, carrying along chunks of pulverized rock up to 15 cm across. In the process, the gas significantly cooled down through contact with the shaft's walls. Most of the energy contained in the propellant (5 to 100 thousand hp) was spent on the actual digging, while the device lowered itself deeper into the well under its own weight. Tsiferov's device was capable of drilling the well tens of metres deep and 250–1000 mm in diameter, depending on the type of soil. Experiments have demonstrated that the device is able to drill holes not only in regular soil, but through solid rock, permafrost, ice and aquifers.

== Fuels ==
=== Solid ===
The solid fuel version of the device was limited by the volume of propellant it could carry, which was sufficient for 5 to 20 seconds of operation, enough to create a well up to 20 metres deep. The inventor saw further progress in moving on to liquid fuel rockets, expecting their operational time to be measured in tens of minutes, with potential to be eventually increased to a few hours.

Tsiferov's device was exhibited at VDNKh-USSR; the inventor was promoted to receive the exhibition's gold medal. The device and drilling method were patented in a number of countries, including US (1975–1976) and Canada (1977–1978).

One of the disadvantages of the rocket drill was poor control, as the fluctuations in the ground composition along its way could severely affect its trajectory. Eventually, a device to control the underground rocket's trajectory was patented. In addition, an auxiliary device for collection of core samples was patented.

=== Liquid ===
In 1980s, under the supervision of the original inventor's son, Vladimir Tsiferov, the liquid-fuel version of the underground rocket was developed, fueled by gasoline-water mixture and oxygen. The most notable feature of this design was its simplicity and ease of manufacturing; except for the drilling head with nozzles, it mostly used off-the-shelf parts. This rocket was capable of drilling a well 10 m deep and 1/2 m in diameter within one minute. According to Soviet geologist Lev Derbenev, this version of the rocket, "jet drilling device", weighs 17 times less than a comparable drilling rig, requires 3 times less fuel, and has 6 to 9 times greater productivity; a single device would provide cost savings of up to 42,000 roubles (53,000 US dollars) in 1984 prices.

== See also ==
- Plasma deep drilling technology
- Subterrene

== Sources ==
- Жолондковский, О. (1966). Подземный рейс огненной фрезы [Underground voyage of fiery endmill]. Техника – молодёжи (in Russian) (12).
- "Rocket to drill into the Earth?". New Scientist. 33. IPC Magazines: 130. 1967.
- "Rocket Drill – for fast deep drilling". Machinery Lloyd. 42. Continental and Overseas Organisation Limited: 59. 1970.
- "Rocket Goes Underground". Petroleum Press Service. 37–38. Petroleum Press Bureau, London: 267. 1970.
- "Self-guided rocket drill". Control & Instrumentation. 2. Morgan-Grampian: 12. 1970.
- "'Rocket Drill' For Deep Holes". The Chartered Mechanical Engineer. 17. Institution of Mechanical Engineers: 67. 1970.
- "Soviets Claim Rocket Burrows Thru Ground". Chicago Tribune: 4:15. 31 May 1970.
- "Unattached Rocket Drills Deep Wells". Machine Design. 42 (1–5). Penton/IPC: 734. 1970.
- Жолондковский, О. (1971). "Землекопы XX века" [Diggers of the 20th Century]. Юный техник (in Russian) (5): 19. Archived from the original on 2019-05-06.
- "Гиперболоид инженера Циферова". Молодая гвардия (7). ЦК ВЛКСМ: 181–182. 1971.
- Милиничев Г. (January 10, 1973). "Огненный смерч, пробивающий землю (подземная ракета инженера Циферова)" [Fiery tornado penetrating earth (Engineer Tsiferov's underground rocket)]. Московская правда.
- Anon. (1973). "New soviet rocket sinks wells". Industrial Research (October): 35.
- "Water and Water Engineering". Water and Water Engineering. 77. Fuel & Metallurgical Journals Ltd.: 343 1973.
- "Rockets for Drilling". The Chartered Mechanical Engineer. 20. Fuel & Metallurgical Journals Ltd.: 23 1973.
- "Soviet method of well drilling". New Civil Engineer. No. 5 July 1973. T. Telford. 1973.
- "Rocket goes underground". Sputnik Monthly Digest. Novosti Printing House. 1973.
- "High speed drilling – 17 m in 18 sec". Highways & Road Construction. 41. IPC Building & Contract Journals Ltd.: 41 1973.
- Грошев, Валерий; Циферов, Владимир (1978). Быть подземной ракете! [Let there be underground rocket!]. Техника – молодёжи (in Russian) (7).
- Друянов, В. А. (1980). "Подземные ракеты, лодки, плазмотроны..." [Underground rockets, subterrinas, plasmatrons...]. Недра – цех под землёй [The bowels of the Earth: the underground workshop] (in Russian). Знание.
- Maurer, William C. (1980). Advanced drilling techniques. Petroleum Publishing Co. pp. 500–507. ISBN 978-0878141173.
- Максимович, Геннадий (1984). История талантливой разработки [The history of a talented design]. Техника – молодёжи (in Russian) (2). Archived from the original on 2013-01-31.
- Oparin V.N.; Danilov B.B.; Smolyanitsky B.N. (2010). "'Underground rocket' design principles". Journal of Mining Science. 46 (5). Springer New York Consultants Bureau: 536–545. doi:10.1007/s10913-010-0067-9. ISSN 1062-7391. S2CID 109585459.
- SU patent 212908, Циферов М. И., "Термогазодинамический способ", issued 1965
- SU patent 522759, Циферов М. И., "Способ М. И. Циферова образования выработок в земной поверхности.", issued 1973-06-07
- Зигуненко, Станислав (2006). Ушел в поход… подземоход: глубоко копаем [Underground vehicle off to a journey: digging deep]. Popular Mechanics Russian Edition (in Russian). 4 (42). Archived from the original on 2012-06-09.
