= List of The Ultraman characters =

This is a character list for the 1979 anime The Ultraman, a joint collaboration of Tsuburaya Production's Ultra Series with the anime studio Sunrise. In contrast to the Showa Era Ultra Series (from Ultra Q to Ultraman Leo), The Ultraman took place in an alternate universe wherein the main Ultraman Joneus was the first to arrive on Earth, as well as his point of origin not being Land of Light in M78, but rather the planet Ultra U-40.

== Earth Defense Army ==
The Earth Defense Army (地球防衛軍, Chikyū Bōei-gun) is a United Nations organization established for the purpose of Earth's defense, space development and observations around the world. There are bases located in the United States, Europe, Africa, and the Far East. Each branch had its own group of Science Defense Squad (科学警備隊, Kagaku Keibitai), (Note: Depending on the material, "科学警備隊" can either be translated as Science Guard Party by Tsuburaya Productions or "Science Defense Squad"/Science Defense Army" by Mill Creek Entertainment's DVD release of The Ultraman.) abbreviated as SDS, an elite squad of soldiers and scientists formed in the wake of mysterious phenomenon across the globe.

=== Science Defense Squad ===
The series focuses mainly on the Far East branch of the SDS; the Earth Defense Army members led by Captain Akiyama, who later on was promoted in episode 26 with Gondo replacing him in episode 28. In the event of Empire of Heller's full-scale invasion on Earth, the SDS disobey orders from Earth and joined the U-40 Fleet to attack the Titan Base and made their invasion on Heller City of U-40. During their raid on the main tower, they were captured and almost executed by Mac Datar before Joneus interfered while Pig released them from their restrains. With the victory of the U-40 Fleet over the war, the SDS were sent back to Earth and bid farewell to Joneus and Amia months later.

Tetsuo Akiyama (アキヤマ 徹男, Akiyama Tetsuo; 1-26)/Captain Adams
Voiced by: Kinya Morikawa (Japanese); Tom Wyner (English)
The original captain of the SDS, who hand picked his Far East branch members on his own. Back in his days as a normal officer, he was a dear friend of Ogawara, who quit his job to build his anti-monster weapon Hector. In addition to his calm behavior, Akiyama is also observant towards his members. In aftermath of Gibaruga's fight, he was transferred to the monster observation team in the USA branch.
Daisuke Gondo (ゴンドウ 大助, Gondō Daisuke; 28-50)/General Steel
Voiced by: Hidekatsu Shibata (Japanese); Sam Reily (English)
The succeeding captain, after replacing Akiyama in episode 28. He is known for wearing a scarlet coat over his uniform. Because of his harsh regiment, the SDS members were insecure with him at first until Gondo managed to save them by instructing the Super Maddock to repair at an emergency rate. Despite his boisterous attitude, he approached his members as an older brother-like figure in contrast to Akiyama's fatherly figure. He had a great intuition towards a monster's movements, such as being able to predict Gamiba's presence on Maroi Island after knowing such place had no record of earthquake by natural means but is also fearful of supernatural existence (such as the rumored sightings of Yuki-onna). When the Empire of Heller's invasion on Earth increased, Gondo rebelled against the high authorities of Earth Defense Army by sending the entire SDS on a mission to join the resistance movement from U-40 to stop the Empire of Heller on their home planet.
Kei Marume (マルメ 敬, Marume Kei; 1-19, 21-50)/Lieutenant Marconi
Voiced by: Shingo Kanemoto (Japanese); Michael Dobson and Joe Perry (English)
Compared to other SDS members, Kei was enlisted after he persuaded Captain Akiyama for the membership. He is the team's sharpshooter and is always cautious on Hikari's constant absence during monster attacks. Despite his boastful antics, Marume is also a thoughtful person and has soft spot for children.
Hiroaki Tobe (トベ 博明, Tobe Hiroaki; 1-19, 21-50)/Lieutenant Glenn
Voiced by: Masanari Nihei (Japanese); Joe Perry (English)
The designer of the Super Maddock, whose recruitment into the team is due to his experience with the aforementioned aircraft. Even before the formation of SDS, Tobe had met Mutsumi earlier as they discussed their interest on the recent mysterious phenomenon that plagued the Earth. He is the team's weapons developer and was the acting captain in-between Akiyama's departure and Gondo's introduction into the SDS. In most missions, Tobe would plan any modifications made on the Super Maddock to better fit in selected mission. In the final episodes, Tobe and Marume managed to figure out Hikari's connection to Joneus by his constant absence during missions, as well as their computer saying there is virtually no difference between the two.
Mutsumi Hoshikawa (星川ムツミ 隊員, Hoshikawa Mutsumi; 1-19, 21-50)/Lieutenant Anne Johnson
Voiced by: Sumi Shimamoto (Japanese); Susan Harry Sprang and Barbara Goodson (English)
An 18 year old medical officer that joined the team due to making researches on the recent mysterious phenomenon. She hated being given a special treatment and strives to keep up with her male members.
Chouichirou Hikari (ヒカリ 超一郎, Hikari Chōichirō)/Scotty Harrison (Note: In the official Tsuburaya material, his name is spelt as "Choichiro".)
Voiced by: Kei Tomiyama (Japanese); Gary Morgan and Steve Kramer (English)
A worker of the Space Satellite EGG3, who encountered Joneus while on his way to join the SDS and had since join forces to fight against monster and alien attacks resulted from a string of mysterious phenomenon on Earth. Because of their merger, Hikari trains daily to keep up with Joneus's performances. In the past, Hikari had once saved the entire Space Satellite EGG3 despite his declining oxygen level by killing a caterpillar-state Goglan from chewing the generator. Additionally, his act of keeping his heroic deeds a secret allows Joneus to choose him as a suitable host, having observe the incident from afar. At one point, Hikari and Joneus lost their lives in fighting the Devil Spirit and were brought to U-40 to be treated. There, he learned of his planet and U-40's connection to each other, fighting against invaders from Badel Star and bonded with Joneus again to save both U-40 and Earth. In the final episodes of the series, Hikari's constant absence has caught the attention of the rest of the SDS members, deducing his connection to Joneus. The two separated as Hikari joined the SDS in raiding Heller City's main tower but merged with Joneus during a fall from the tower.

=== Other members of Earth Defense Army ===
Pig (ピグ, Pigu)/PDQ
Voiced by: Junpei Takiguchi (Japanese); Barbara Goodson (English)
One of the 100 robots who served the Earth Defense Army, Pig, or known by his actual name Computer Robot 78 (コンピュータロボット・78, Konpyūta Robotto Nana-jū Hachi) is chosen to aid the SDS as an analyzer. When Robot 101 was sent on a test run in the SDS's base, Pig felt itself outdated with constant ringing of monster presence (due to Compugon's activity) and ran away from the base with a malfunctioned Badei in order to commit suicide until Compugon's appearance restore his self confidence. In the event of Invader People's invasion on Earth, Pig becomes a stand-in pilot after Tobe and Marume stuck in monster containment planet Prison while Hikari (and later Mutsumi) was hospitalized from his injuries.
Monchi (モンキ, Monki)
Voiced by: Shigeru Chiba
SDS's monkey mascot and Pig's companion.
In episode 43, Monchi entered the Heller Army's electron transmitter by accident and fused with their Dostony A into Monchi-Dostony (モンキ・ドストニー, Monki Dosutonī; 43) until the Heller Fleet split them back to normal. (Note: Depending on the magazine, its name in romanization could either be "Monkey-Dostney" or "Monki-Dostony".) As a result, the Dostony it bonded to had its consciousness suppressed and was brought back to the Heller Army's Titan Base. Monchi was separated shortly after and escaped the base through said transmitter to return to Earth.
Robot 101 (ロボット101号, Robotto Ichi Maru Ichi-go; 7)
Voiced by: Ichirō Nagai
Earth Defense Army's latest robot manufactured by the Far East Zone Robot Factory (極東ゾーンロボット工場, Kyokutō Zōn Robotto Kōjō). It was sent to SDS for its training and demonstrate an apathetic behavior to its senior Pig due to the latter being an outdated model. After Compugon's destruction, 101 passed its test run with a 98% and was transferred to the Japan Alps.
Ulook (ウルック, Urukku; 38-42, 45-50)
Voiced by: Yukari Nozawa
A series of assistant robots found on the Battle Ship "Ultria." One particular model, 2001, was activated by Pig and served the SDS since then. The miniature robot is constantly at odds with Pig due to their same positions. Although it exited the Ultria before its destruction, what happened to it in the events after the Heller Empire's collapse are unknown.
Yuriko Nojima (野島 ユリ子, Nojima Yuriko; 12, 13, 18)
Voiced by: Mari Okamoto
Nicknamed "Yuri," a female worker in the Earth Defense Army's coffee shop, who previously failed in an entry exam for the enlistment of SDS. Being a fan of monsters, her room has several pictures of them, including those from Return of Ultraman, such as Woo and Chameleking. She initially left her home at South Ukigo Island and lied about her membership to her father until the Islanda incident. However, the two reconciled as her father encouraged her on her job.
General Sakurada (桜田長官, Sakurada Chōkan; 1, 7, 14, 19, 26, 28, 29, 35, 36, 38, 45, and 47)
Voiced by: Ryūsuke Shiomi
The chief of Earth Defense Army in the Far East branch, he recruited Captain Akiyama as the first leader of the SDS.
Mr. Miyai (宮井副官, Miyai Fukkan; 19, 26, 28, 38 and 45)
Voiced by: Toshiya Ueda (26, 28, 38), Toshirō Ishii (19), Minoru Midorikawa (45)
Doctor Henry Nishiki (ヘンリー・ニシキ教授, Henrī Nishiki Kyōju; 5, 17, 32, 44)
Voiced by: Kazuo Kumakura
A rude London-born professor of Japanese descendant from the Africa Branch of the Earth Defense Army. Henry had been studying the disappearance of forests in Africa for a year and discover its cause to be the Toughguilar family of monsters. He gained custody of the two monsters cubs, Tafugirao and Tafugirako, and brought them along to Africa. He is least favored by the members of SDS due to his behavior and the inability to remember others' names properly but at the same time was revealed to have feigned his carelessness to observe others' behavior properly. In episode 44, Henry was given the permission from the Earth Defense Army to study the Ultria as he found a second control room and allowing the ship to split into two components during battle.
Paburo (パブロ; 17)
Voiced by: Shigeru Chiba
An African member of Earth Defense Army whose helicopter crashed in a desert.

=== Mechs and vehicles ===
- Super Maddock (スーパーマードック号, Sūpā Mādokku-gō)/Super Star: A multipurpose aircraft designed by Tobe. It was originally made for the Far East branch of Earth Defense Army before Captain Akiyama demanded the ship in exchange for leading the SDS. During long distance missions, it can act as a mobile base and has a room for scientific analysis. In episode 6, Tobe modified the Super Maddock with harpoon ammunition and an outer shell for underwater combat. It was destroyed in episode 37.
  - Badei (バーディ, Bādi)/Mini Rocket: A red fighter jet of Earth Defense Army used for reconnaissance purposes. It has canard wings and laser guns on each side. Pig once rode a malfunctioning gray-colored Badei before the others talked him out of his suicidal thoughts. In episode 47, space variants of the Badei units were introduced to fight against the invading fleet.
  - Beatamy (ベータミー, Bētamī): An orange-colored prototype VTOL which usually stored on the left side of Super Maddock. It is equipped with a rotating cannon on its back. Episode 48 saw the development of a space variant of the Beatamy for outer space combat purposes.
- Passenger (パッセージャー号, Passējā-gō): A subterrene first used for investigating forest disappearances in episode 5. In episode 33, a second unit called the Passenger II (パッセージャー2号, Passējā Nigō) was built as its successor with twin drills and used in the underground exploration of Maroi Island.
- Shooter ASS (シューターASS, Shūtā Ē Esu Esu): Six-wheeled patrol cars with butterfly doors.
- Space Craft N3 (ステーションホークN3, Sutēshon Hōku Enu Surī): An aircraft used by Tobe and Marume to explore the monster containment planet Prison in episode 34, but was destroyed by a rampaging monster.
- Spacecraft "Ultria" (巨大戦闘艦ウルトリア, Kyodai Sentō-kan Urutoria): A 300 meter long space combat ship which was created by the people of U40 and buried underneath the South Pole for safekeeping. In the height of the Empire of Heller's invasion on U-40, Amia escaped to Earth and reactivated the ship, giving it to the SDS in countering Heller's attack on Earth, as well as replacing the destroyed Super Maddock. Being made by the Ultras, the ship is powered by a nuclear fusion energy that is not of Earth properties and can sustain itself for at least 100 years. In episode 44, the Ultria was shown capable of splitting into two different components, Ultria A (ウルトリアα号, Urutoria Arufa-gō) and Ultria B (ウルトリアβ号, Urutoria Bēta-gō) respectively.

== Ultra People ==
In The Ultraman, the Ultra People (ウルトラ人, Urutora-jin) are human-like residents of planet Ultra U-40 (ウルトラの星U40(ユーフォーティー), Urutora no Hoshi Yū Fōtī), demonstrating a similar culture to Ancient Greece, wearing garments such as the Himation and Toga. Despite their initially primitive appearance, they possess advance science and technology, with an underground city which was hidden beneath the planet's surface.

A long time ago, the citizens of U-40 were human-like beings who wished to expand their race further to the outer space. Earth was one of the stars they visited and established the very first human civilization with Neanderthals. To combat against the evil forces in space, they created the Ultra-mind (ウルトラマインド, Urutora Maindo) and became Ultra-Humanoids (ウルトラヒューマノイド, Urutora Hyūmanoido). They would soon discard the Ultra-mind within a black hole to prevent any misuse from outside forces.

When the Earth was plagued by mysterious phenomenon, the Ultras sent their message and strongest warrior Joneus to guard the planet from monster attacks. One of these nefarious forces, called the Badel People invaded U-40 as their Devil Spirits were acting on Earth. With Joneus still in recuperation, Elec, Loto and the other five warriors would fight the invading forces while Hikari and Amia tried to invade the Badel Star. A fully healed Joneus participated in the battle again to save his kind while the other seven warriors contain the stolen Ultra-mind. However, not long after that, the Empire of Heller, a renegade faction of the Ultra People, invaded the U-40 in retaliation of their banishment in the past. The surviving Ultra People were led by Elec and Loto as the U-Fleet (U(ウルトラ)艦隊, Urutora Kantai; the "U" stands for "Ultra"), with the SDS joined them in a campaign to reclaim U-40. With the Empire of Heller defeated and Heller killed, U-40 citizens that previously scattered in outer space returned to their home world and celebrated Joneus's victory.

Although still in human size, eight chosen warriors of U-40 have Star Symbols (スターシンボル, Sutā Shinboru) on their chest allowing them to change their sizes into giants and travel to any planets in short distances and measure their energy levels. As the Earth's atmosphere quickly drains their energies, they can only sustain their giant forms for 4 minutes as the Star Symbol changes color from blue to yellow, and finally to red after 30 seconds. When bonded with an Earthling or to transform into giant sizes, they used the beam-Flasher (ビームフラッシャー, Bīmu Furasshā), a star-like pendant by placing it on their forehead to transform. Starting from episode 20, later appearances had the transformation style added with the phrase "Ultrachange!" (ウルトラチェンジ!, Urutora Chenji!). According to Elec and Loto, regular people of U-40 can submit themselves into suspended animation to survive for a longer period, though this required the Ultra-mind to reverse the process altogether.

Ultraman Joneus (ウルトラマンジョーニアス, Urutoraman Jōniasu) (Note: His name can be shortened as Ultraman Joe (ウルトラマンJ（ジョー）, Urutoraman Jō). Depending on the material, the Katakana for ジョーニアス (Jōniasu) can either be written as "Joneus" in Tsuburaya's official websites and materials, or "Jonias"/"Joe"/"J" in Mill Creek's DVD subtitles.)
Voiced by: Masatō Ibu (Japanese); Gary Morgan and Tom Wyner (English) (Note: In the past, Masatō worked under the pseudonym Masayuki.)

Ultraman Joneus (front) with the episode 8 monster Mosmanda (back).

The eponymous Ultraman, Joneus is the strongest warrior of his kind who was dispatched to Earth in the height of unnatural phenomenon that caused monsters to appear. He bonded with SDS member, Chouichirou Hikari, during the youth's return to Earth and had been helping his team in defending Earth from monster attacks. During Badel's invasion on Earth and U-40, Joneus and Hikari lost their lives in the ensuing battle and were carried to his home world for recuperation. The recently healed Joneus bonded with Hikari once more to reverse the tide of the battle, therefore saving both their planets. During the U-40's Fleet's raid on Heller City, Joneus separated with Hikari to join his brethren in space in fighting against Empire of Heller's combat ships. Once his deed was done, he would fuse with the youth in one final time to save the SDS and Amia. Once peace has returned to Earth, Joneus revealed his human form to Hikari as he and Amia stayed on Earth to help repair the damages done from the ensuing war. Months later, the two bid farewell to the SDS but promised to return should Earth's safety be threatened again.
Since Joneus was the initial sole Ultraman in the series, he was only named as "Ultraman" from Pig's analysis and is referred to this by the Earthlings as well. Starting from episode 20, his original name Joneus was revealed and Hikari started calling his Ultraman partner by his real name in episode 46. Although his height is averagely 70 meters like his kind, Joneus can shift his size freely into microscopic and even enlarging to 120 meters after absorbing enough sunlight. His favored attack is Planium Ray (プラニウム光線, Puraniumu Kōsen), which can be presented in two versions; A Type (shooting a ball of light) or B Type (conventional hand beams like M78 Ultramen).
Elec (エレク, Ereku; 19-21, 27, 29, 31, 34, 35, 48-50)/Maral
Voiced by: Masaru Ikeda
The first Ultra Warrior aside from Joneus to appear. Having received the distressed beacon from his fellow brethren, Elec came to Earth with a space saucer and brought Hikari's lifeless body to U-40 for a resuscitation operation. He would join Loto and five other chosen warriors to defend their home world and reclaim the Ultra Mind when Badel tried to expel them from their planet.
His human form is known for his blonde hair. In his transformed state, Elec can use Elekrium Beam (エレクリウムビーム, Erekuriumu Bīmu) and Elec Barrier (エレクバリヤー, Ereku Bariyā) energy shield.
Loto (ロト, Roto; 20, 21, 27, 29, 34, 35, 48-50)/Jedal
Voiced by: Yoshito Miyamura
Elec's comrade during their war with the Badel People, who return to combat despite his injuries. Alongside Loto, they founded the U-Fleet from U-40 residents that fled from Heller's tyrannical regime.
His human form is distinctively known for his brown hair. As an Ultra Humanoid, he can fire the Lotolaria Ray (ロトラリア光線, Rotoraria Kōsen) as his finisher.
Amia (アミア; 20, 21, 31, 37, 38, 47-50)/Anya
Voiced by: Kumiko Takizawa (Japanese); Gladys Enright (English)
Joneus's younger sister. After healing Hikari during the Ultra People's fight with Badel, the two would pilot a spacecraft to attack the alien forces but separated from a stray beam as Joneus bonded with the youth again and saved his little sister. At some point of time, Amia developed an affection for Hikari and decided to go to Earth by stealing a Star Symbol, bonded with an ill girl named Kyoko Kodaka (小高 京子, Kodaka Kyōko), and even helped Joneus in fighting against Garubados. She arrived on Earth again to uncover the battleship Ultria in the height of the Empire of Heller's invasion but was forced to rejoin the surviving Ultra People. Hearing that the army would send a full scale invasion on Earth, Amia posed as one of the soldiers and slipped into an invading ship to contact the SDS. When the Ultria was dispatched to space, Amia joined the SDS and later her own kind but was kidnapped by the Empire of Heller and put on trial by Heller. When Joneus and the other seven warriors foiled Heller's attempt to escape, Amia resurrected the President and escaped. Amia would later on join Joneus in observing Earth for months before returning to their home world.
As an Ultra Humanoid, Amia can unleash the Amiassher (アミアッシャー, Amiasshā) energy beam and use the Amia Eye (アミア・アイ, Amia Ai) technique to see in the dark.
President (大賢者, Dai Kenja; 20, 21, 27, 31, 34, 37, 49, 50)
Voiced by: Kōhei Miyauchi
The main leading figure of U-40 and its residents. He issued the war against Badel People when their forces threatened the safety of his home world. During Heller Empire's invasion, the President instructed Amia to find her brother before he was captured and imprisoned by Heller. Heller reduced the President to atoms and kept his atomic makeup on a computer card before Amia restored him when Joneus ravaged through the throne room. Once peace returned to U-40, the President congratulated Joneus, Hikari and the SDS for their contribution in reclaiming their home world.
Five Warriors (5人の戦士, Gonin no Senshi; 20, 21, 29, 48-50)
A group of five other chosen warriors of U-40, three of them were named Noah (ノア, Noa), Mige (ミゲル, Migeru) and Meleg (メレグ, Meregu). They were first seen participating in the campaign against Badel People to defend their home world and later on joined Joneus destroy Baradon's saucer in episode 27.
By themselves, they can fire Ultra Warrior Hand Beam (ウルトラ戦士ハンドビーム, Urutora Senshi Hando Bīmu) or combine with three others (Joneus, Elec and Loto) to form Ultra Super Laser (ウルトラスーパーレーザー, Urutora Sūpā Rēzā) and Ultra Warriors Joint Barrier (ウルトラ戦士合同バリヤー, Urutora Senshi Gōdō Bariyā).
Zamius (ザミアス, Zamiasu; 21)
Voiced by: Osamu Kato
The U-40 Fleet Commander who lead his people in the war against Badel People. As revealed in the Ultraman Taiga Voice Drama The Ultraman Titas, he has a son named Matia and adopted Titas, losing his the former during Heller Empire's invasion.

== Antagonists ==
=== Badel People ===
Evil Aliens Badel People (凶悪星人 バデル族, Kyōaku Seijin Baderu-zoku; 20, 21) (Note: Depending on the magazine, romanization can either be "Badel" or "Bader".)
A barbaric tribe born from a race of reptiles that evolved into humanoid-like bodies. A long time ago, the Badel People raged war upon the citizens of U-40 when the Ultra People failed to develop communication with them. They managed to fight back by creating the Ultra-mind that transform them into Ultramen. In the present day, the Badel People had become advanced enough that they managed to retrieve the Ultra-mind from a black hole and created the Devil Spirit to attack the Earth, all while using their home planet-turned planetary scale battle station Badel Star (バデルスター, Baderu Sutā) to resume their campaign on U-40. With the Ultra-mind reclaimed and Bagon defeated, the Badel forces were eliminated.

- Devil Spirit (精神寄生体, Seishin Kiseitai; 19, 21): By using the Ultra-mind stolen from the depths of a black hole, they created the Devil Spirit, a malevolent spiritual entity that would assimilate with any reptile turning them into monsters. On Earth, the Parasite have been known to use the bodies of Guerad, Janur and Bedoran before finally destroyed in Janur III. Assimilated monsters have the Reptile Monster (は虫怪獣, Hachū Kaijū) prefix on their name: (Note: Subtitle is also read as Hachūrui Kaijū (は虫類怪獣), although retaining the same meaning in English nonetheless.)
  - Guerad (ゲラド, Gerado; 19): Born from the Devil Spirit possessing a monitor lizard, it rampaged across three major cities in African continent and fought Joneus to the point of exhaustion before exploding from the latter's Planium Ray. This form is known for the ability to exhale flames.
  - Janur (ジャニュール, Janyūru; 19): (Note: Depending on the magazine, its name in romanization could either be "Janur" or "Jyanur".) Once Guerad had been destroyed, the Devil Spirit would assimilate with a king cobra, fighting the severely weakened Joneus with its electricity-induced constriction before the Ultra retreated.
  - Bedorun (ベドラン, Bedoran; 19): (Note: Depending on the magazine, its name in romanization could either be "Bedlan" or "Bedorun".) A stegosaurus monster that served as the Devil Spirit's new body, rampaging in North America. With its 900,000° fire breath and horns, it managed to beat the weakened Joneus to death.
  - Janur III (ジャニュールIII世, Janyūru Sansei; 21): (Note: Depending on the magazine, its name in romanization could either be "Janur III" or "Jyanur-III".) A three headed variant of Janur which the SDS fought against. When the Ultra-mind was sealed by seven chosen warriors, Janur III and the Devil Spirit lost their strength as they were destroyed by Super Maddock and Badei units.
- Dark Monster Bagon (暗黒怪獣 バゴン, Ankoku Kaijū Bagon; 21): A gigantic monster that Badel sent to attack U-40, who is capable of exhaling white flames for offensive means. It originated from the deepest part of the space and was originally uncontrollable until the Badel get their hands on the Ultra-mind. While the rest of the chosen Ultra People sealed the Ultra-mind, Joneus fought against Bagon on his home world and successfully destroy it with Rocking Spark while being thrown into the frictional heat during its atmospheric fall into U40.
- Space Star Beast Garubados (宇宙星獣 ガルバドス, Uchū Seijū Garubadosu; 31): (Note: Depending on the magazine, romanization can either be "Galbados" or "Garbados".) A nautilus space monster that is remnant of Badel's fighting forces, it went to Earth after tailing Amia's energy sphere. Because Joneus used up most of his energies to heal Kyoko, he was partially drained in the battle and almost defeated until Amia transformed and destroy it when both siblings combine their energy beam.

=== Empire of Heller ===
The Empire of Heller (ヘラー帝国, Herā Teikoku) is an empire established by Heller and other 3,000 like-minded Ultra family who became Heller People after abusing the Ultra-mind for immortality instead of an Ultraman form. (Note: In the 2013 Tsuburaya All Monsters Photobook, the race that Heller and his followers turn into are known as Anti Ultra Humanoids (反ウルトラヒューマノイド, Han Urutora Hyūmanoido).) 10,000 years later, the Empire invaded U-40 and attempted to target Earth for Ultraman Joneus and the battleship Ultria. Aside from his fellow U-40 brethren, the Empire also had membership of aliens from other races and different kinds of monsters. When planning attacks on Earth, a portion of the fleet were led by Roigar resided on one of Saturn's moons and set up the Titan Base (タイターン基地, Taitān Kichi).

Following the death of Gedon, the Empire of Heller sent an all out attack on Earth to destroy any remaining humans. This caused the SDS to disobey the Earth Self Defense Army in joining the U-Fleet to destroy the Titan Base and made their way to U-40, delivering a counterattack on Heller City (ヘラーシティ, Herā Shiti). The death of Heller and resurrection of the President cemented the group's defeat as the U-Fleet regained their home world.

Heller (ヘラー, Herā; 37, 38, 49, 50)
Voiced by: Tamio Ōki
The major antagonist of The Ultraman. Heller's wish for immortality caused him and his followers to be banished from U-40 towards the dark nebula, in which he established his fleet and invaded his former home world 10,000 years later. Fearing that the surviving Ultra family would cooperate with humans, Heller ordered the full scale invasion on Earth to wipe any surviving humans left. When the U-Fleet and SDS eliminated most of his fleet, Heller try to escape with the Ultra-mind and the President's data by ejecting the entire Heller City from U-40 but Joneus intruded at the last minute to save Amia and the President while Heller died in the ensuing explosion of Heller City.
Roigar (ロイガー, Roigā; 37-44, 48)
Voiced by: Ryūzaburō Ōtomo
The de jure leader of the Empire of Heller, overseeing the invasion of Earth from one of Saturn's moons. He was also responsible for sending various monsters to Earth, including deceiving other aliens to do Heller's bidding. When Amia was captured during the SDS and Ultra family's assault on the Titan Base, Roigar arranged Amia to be sent on a rocket and allow himself to die in his base's self destruction.
Soldiers of Heller (ヘラー軍兵士, Herā-gun Heishi; 37-43, 45-50) (Note: Written as "Heller's Soldier" in the magazine.)
Voiced by: Shigeru Chiba, Minoru Inaba, Ken Yamaguchi, Masashi Hirose, Yusaku Yara, Tōru Shinagawa, Hajime Koseki, Satoshi Ōgiya, Toshimasa Ueda
Armored soldiers of the Empire of Heller with horned helmets. Regular soldiers are known for their grey armor whereas high ranking personnel wear red versions.
The Empire of Heller Earth Attack Commander (ヘラー軍地球攻撃司令官, Herā-gun Chikyū Kōgeki Shirei-kan; 47)
Voiced by: Tetsuo Mizutori
A leading officer that ordered the capture of Hikari and Amia when the two snuck into their ship. He was killed in the resulting explosion when Joneus commenced his attack.
Space Soldier Giro Space-men (宇宙兵士 ギロ星人, Uchū Heishi Giro Seijin; 41) (Note: Depending on the magazine, its name in romanization could also be either "Alien Guillo" or "Alien Giro".)
Voiced by: Yasuo Tanaka, Shigeru Chiba
An alien race whose planet was among those ravaged by the Empire of Heller and demanded a third of the Earth should they successfully helped overthrowing Ultraman Joneus and the Earth Self-Defense Army. They sent their monster Giros for their fake Ultraman Joneus to fight while studying the underground passage for invasion purposes. Once testing completed, they sent both Giros and the fake Joneus on a rampage to fight against Ultria but once both their forces defeated, they try to attack the defenseless Ultraman on their own until Ultria opened fire on their saucer.
Space Demon Army Alien Sien (宇宙魔軍 サイエン星人, Uchū Magun Saien Seijin; 44) (Note: Depending on the magazine, its name in romanization could either be "Sciene" or "Sien".)
Voiced by: Yoshito Miyamura, Minoru Inaba and Shigeru Chiba
An alien race under the Empire of Heller's servitude. From their Sciender, they launched Capsule Monster Capera Don to Earth as invasion forces. As the Sciender was destroyed by Joneus, several of them try to flee in their space fighter, only to be killed by the Ultria ships' laser beams and Joneus's Premium Beam.
Flying Saucer "Sciender" (隕石円盤サイエンダー, Inseki Enban Saiendā) is a 10 km diameter meteorite which was modified into their space saucer and base of operations. It houses a large number of missiles and space vessels of the Empire, as well as a Saucer Monster Spader to guard their base. From the Sciender, they also launched the Capera Don monsters to Earth. The Ultria ships would attack the base and was destroyed with the help of Joneus.
Android Soldier "Android Unit 201" (アンドロイド兵士 アンドロイド201部隊, Andoroido Heishi Andoroido Ni Maru ichi Butai; 45)
Voiced by: Shojiro Kihara (Jinda), Minoru Inaba, Ken Yamaguchi and Shigeru Chiba
A team of androids who posed as Captain Zinda (ジンダ隊長, Jinda Taichō) and a squadron of Unit 201 (201部隊, Ni Maru ichi Butai) from the Earth Self Defense Army Far East Zone. After slipping into the SDS's base, they first bomb the main generator and try to sabotage the Ultria battleship. A portion of their squadron faced against Tobe and Marume's team of guards. The Captain Zinda impostor placed a bomb on Pig but was killed by Hikari upon transforming into Joneus.
Empire of Heller's fighting forces

- Capsule Monster Gumons (カプセル怪獣 グモンス, Kapuseru Kaijū Gumonsu; 37, 38): A monster from dark nebula that was sent to uncover the battleship Ultria on Earth. Joneus fought against it as Gumons was killed by the firepower of Ultria, boarded by Amia.
- Giant Strange Cat Hell Cat (巨大怪猫 ヘルキャット, Kyodai Kaibyō Herukyatto; 39): The first assassin sent by Roigar to Earth, it is a space life form from dark nebula that drains its target of energy to grow in size. The Hell Cat targeted a space shuttle and killed its crew members as it returned to Earth one year ahead from its intended schedule. Posing as a harmless domestic cat, it slipped into the space station EGG-3 and killed a patrolling guard on duty, forcing the Ultria to leave but the Hell Cat managed to enter it undetected. After attacking Pig and Mutsumi in her shower, Joneus appeared as he lured Hell Cat to an empty room as Pig detonated the wall for both of them to be ejected to outer space. With the sunlight, a fully charged Joneus continued his battle and destroy the Hell Cat with the Premium Beam with the help of the Ultra's anti-proton beam.
- Fake Ultraman Joneus (にせウルトラマンジョーニアス, Nise Urutoraman Jōniasu; 41): (Note: Also read as "Imit-Ultraman Joenias". Its full name in Japanese is Ultraman X Fake Ultraman Joneus (ウルトラマンX にせウルトラマンジョーニアス, Urutoraman Ekkusu Nise Urutoraman Jōniasu) but certain sources would even proclaim his true name as Ultraman X (ウルトラマンX, Urutoraman Ekkusu), which would later given to the titular character in 2015.) A robotic knock-off of Ultraman Joneus which the Giro Space-men first used in a staged fight against their own monster Giros on three occasions. After the Giro Space-men succeeded in their plan, the fake Joneus would join forces with Giros to attack the battleship Ultria. The real Joneus fought against him and caught in a beam struggle. When the fake Joneus loses, his body turned blue and exploded. Being a copy of Joneus, his grunts is on a lower pitch and shoots planium X-beam (プラニウムX光線, Puraniumu Ekkusu Kōsen).
- Rotating Monster Giros (回転怪獣 ギロス, Kaiten Kaijū Girosu; 41): (Note: Depending on the magazine, its name in romanization could either be "Guillos" or "Giros".) A monster that Giros Space-men used as part of their invasion forces. It participated in a mock fight against fake Joneus three times before they were called to help the Empire of Heller in rampaging at an urban area. After defeating the fake Joneus, the Ultra switched his focus to Giros and defeated it with Premium Beam. Giros can unveil a set of blades on its torso which rotates to create a tornado to shield itself or tearing apart any objects in its path.
- Electric Monster Neo Dostony (電送怪獣 ネオドストニー, Densō Kaijū Neo Dosutonī; 43): (Note: Depending on the magazine, its name in romanization could either be "Dostney" or "Dostony". Additionally, units 1 and 2 are named as "A" and "B" in the magazines, respectively.) A fusion of both dark nebula Dostony monsters, A and B when their particles fused through the electron transmitter in the Titan Base. Once deployed to Earth, Neo Dostony fought the army with its fire breath as Joneus appeared and threw the monster to its electron transmitter, destroying both machine and monster with Premium Beam.
  - Dostony A (ドストニーA, Dosutonī Ē; 43): The first of the Empire of Heller's Dostony units to be sent to Earth through their electron transmitter, unfortunately, it fused with Monchi into Monchi-Dostony and had its consciousness suppressed. The fusion was kept imprisoned by Earth Self Defense Army until Dostony B captured it to be brought back to the Titan Base. Upon return, Dostony A was separated from Monchi and fused with its brother unit into Neo Dostony.
  - Dostony B (ドストニーB, Dosutonī Bī; 43): The second Dostony to be created and sent to retrieve its brother unit that was fused with Monchi. Once they returned to the Titan Base, they were simultaneously fused into Neo Dostony.
- Saucer Monster Spader (円盤怪獣 スペーダー, Enban Kaijū Supēdā; 44): (Note: Depending on the magazine, its name in romanization could either be "Svader" or "Spader".) The Siender's guardian, deployed to attack the Ultria Alpha. As the Beta half joined the fray, Joneus dragged Spader away from it the Ultria and destroy it with Premium Beam.
- Capsule Monster Capera Don (カプセル怪獣 カペラドン, Kapuseru Kaijū Kaperadon; 44): (Note: Depending on the magazine, its name in romanization could either be "Capera Don" or "Kaperadon".) A herd of monsters which deployed by Alien Sien in containment pods. Nine of them were descended to attack Earth on various continents of the planet before worldwide forces of Earth Self Defense Army taken care of them. A second wave were destroyed by the firepower of Ultria Alpha in space, but one managed to slip into Earth, forcing the ship's Beta half to go after it. Joneus defeated the monster before the Ultria Beta resume its journey with warp drive.
- Cumulus Monster Golding (積雲怪獣 ゴルディング, Sekiun Kaijū Gorudingu; 45): (Note: Depending on the magazine, its name in romanization could either be "Golding" or "Gording".) A space monster deployed to attack an urban area. From its mouth, it can form the Rock Chain Attack (岩石チェーン攻撃, Ganseki Chēn Kōgeki) to whip its opponents with and can shroud itself with energy to counter beam attacks. With the Zinda Android's bomb removed from Pig, Joneus threw it into Golding's mouth as it exploded upon detonation.
- Mecha Monster Gedon (メカ怪獣 ゲドン, Meka Kaijū Gedon; 46): (Note: Depending on the magazine, its name in romanization could either be "Guedon" or "Gedon".) A giant robot which moves about in a caterpillar thread with its weapon being three Vulcan Cannons on its hands and fires Beam Eye (ビームアイ, Bīmu Ai) from its singular optic. A saucer from the Empire of Heller controlled it from the sky. While rampaging in an urban area, Joneus's presence forced it to retreat until the monster return at night to attack the SDS base. Through the transmitter that Tobe made, Hikari fine tuned it for Mutsumi to tell him as Joneus of the Heller Saucer's location. This allows Joneus to destroy the Empire members on board, causing Gedon to go haywire and destroyed from Joneus's Premium Beam.
- Combination Monster Heleumeya (合成獣 ヘラ・ウマーヤ, Gōsei-jū Hera Umāya; 48): (Note: Depending on the magazine, its name in romanization could also be either "Hela Umaya" or "Hela=Umaaya".) A monster that guarded the Titan Base and was deployed when Amia, Hikari and Marume invaded their base. With the ability to breathe fire, Heleumeya weakened Joneus until Elec and Loto arrived, defeating the monster off-screen.
- Heller's Pet "Panther" (ヘラーのペット パンサー, Herā no Petto Pansā; 49, 50): A horned space panther which helped in capturing Amia during her attempt to escape custody. Before Panther could execute Amia under Heller's orders, it was attacked by Joneus and killed in Heller City's destruction.
- Execution Monster Macdater (処刑怪獣 マクダター, Shokei Kaijū name is written in the magazines as "Makdatar".) The last monster of the series, Macdater was a carnivorous monster from the dark nebula and kept underneath Heller City. It was released to kill the captured SDS members before Hikari transform into Joneus and joined with Elec and Loto to destroy it.

== Other monsters and aliens ==
- Freezing Monster Seagla (冷凍怪獣 シーグラ, Reitō Kaijū Shīgura; 1): The first monster to be awakened, it was originally frozen in the Antarctic iceberg which splits and flowed into the equator while remaining frozen until Seagla broke free from it. Three other Seaglas were awakened when the first one brought their iceberg to the Tokyo Bay as Joneus debuted during their attack. Two of them were tricked by Joneus to freeze each other as he killed the remaining duo with Premium Beam.
- Tornado Monster Spiral (竜巻怪獣 スパイラル, Tatsumaki Kaijū Supairaru; 2): A gigantic sentient tornado of 480 meters and beyond, whose true form is a beating heart with five tentacles. It attacked several power stations to consume their energy and accidentally caught Mutsumi in one of its hunts. The SDS lured Spiral to their headquarters as Marume went into the tornado and had Mutsumi activated a signal flare, allowing Joneus to save them after killing its heart with Astro Beam.
- Division Monster Wanigodon (分裂怪獣 ワニゴドン, Bunretsu Kaijū Wanigodon; 3): Coming from Mt. Jūgō (十合山, Jūgō-yama), Wanigodon faced against the attacks from army forces as Marume delivers a killing blow that took down the monster. Investigations conducted by the scientists revealed that Wanigodon's regenerative factor allowed it to create more clones of itself should any of its fragment survived. One of them was Pero as two other joined it to fight against Joneus at the seaside. Through Pero's sensitivity to the sea water, Joneus threw all three monsters into the lake.
  - Division Monster Pero (分裂怪獣 ペロ, Bunretsu Kaijū Pero; 3): A smaller division of Wanigodon which was taken care by Takashi. Within a single night, Pero grew into the size of a domestic pet as it became a fully grown Wanigodon by the next day. Pero was killed by Joneus's Premium Beam after being thrown into the sea.
- Cloud Monster Red Smogy (雲怪獣 レッドスモーギ, Kumo Kaijū Reddo Sumōgi; 4): (Note: Depending on the magazine, its name in romanization could also either be "Red Smogy" or "Red Smogi".) A sentient red cloud from space that suddenly appeared above the Japan Alps. During the SDS's attempt to neutralize it, the cloud reacted from the heavy rain into a giant monster whose screaming in pain. To prevent Red Smogy from endangering the dam, Joneus scattered the rain clouds with Premium Beam, allowing it to revert into a red cloud from the sunlight's radiation as he brought it away from Earth.
- Underground Monster Toughguilian (地底怪獣 タフギラン, Chitei Kaijū Tafugiran; 5): (Note: Depending on the magazine, its name in romanization could also either be "Thoughgilan" or "Taffgiran".) A green-colored undersea monster from Africa continent that ate forests before moving to Japan a year later to do the same. It was named by Dr. Henry Nishiki. When Toughguilas was attacked by the SDS, Toughguilan resurfaced to defend its mate but both were decimated by Joneus's Premium Beam.
- Underground Monster Toughguilas (地底怪獣 タフギラス, Chitei Kaijū Tafugirasu; 5): (Note: Depending on the magazine, its name in romanization could also either be "Thoughgilas" or "Taffgiras".) The brown-colored counterpart/mate of Toughguilar whose also from Africa continent and set up a nest underground the Japan Alps for its children Tafugirao and Tafugirako. Thoughguilas made it to surface after their nest was invaded by the Passenger and killed alongside its male counterpart by Joneus's Premium Beam.
- Underground Monsters Tafugirao and Tafugirako (地底子怪獣 タフギラオとタフギラコ, Chitei-ko Kaijū Tafugirao to Tafugirako; 5, 17): (Note: Depending on the magazine, its name in romanization could also either be "Thoughgilaco" or "Taffgirako".) The children of Toughguilar and Toughguilas, Tafugirao is the male with horns to differentiate its sister Tafugirako. When Joneus killed both parents, he shrunk the children to harmless size as Dr. Henry Nishiki brought them to his home in Africa.
- Lava Monster Firebadon (溶岩怪獣 ファイヤバドン, Yōgan Kaijū Faiyabadon; 6): A bat-like monster from beneath the volcanic area of Pacific Oceans, having its history recorded since the ancient times by literature. During its second attack on several ships, Firebadon retreated to the depths of the ocean due to its inability to sustain for five minutes without any source of magma. The Super Maddock was modified to attack Firebadon in a volcanic area of the ocean before Joneus took matters to his own, firing a beam of energy on the same area which Super Mardock shot its harpoon, reducing the monster to pieces. Firebadon is capable of flying at the speed of Mach 7 and exhales fire from its mouth.
- Electronic Monster Compugon (電子怪獣 コンビューゴン, Denshi Kaijū Konbyūgon; 7): (Note: Spelled as Combugon in the magazines.) A space monster which attacked a space station five years prior and absorbed its main computer, crash landed on the Earth and went slumber underground since then. In the present day, Compugon was awakened from the electric waves resulted by Planet Ziora (惑星ジオラ, Wakusei Jiora) as Pig detected its presence but the latter deemed it as a malfunction in its system. During Compugon's rise, Pig used the old Badei to open fire on the monster's back as Joneus rip apart said computer, reverting the monster to its original form to be brought away towards outer space.
- Space Ninja Baltan (宇宙忍者 バルタン星人, Uchū Ninja Barutan Seijin; 8): (Note: Spelled as Combugon in the magazines.) An alien who attempted to dispose Joneus in order to continue his invasion project unopposed. In his human form, Baltan captured photos of Ultraman Joneus's fight with Mosmanda as a phony attempt to deceive the television stations as if it contained the Ultraman's secret. By luring Hikari to a Western house, Baltan had the former in a trap until the SDS members freed him. After freezing the rescuing party, Baltan grew to giant size and fought against Joneus until he was detonated from the Premium Beam. From its claws, Baltan can fire S Flash (S電光, Esu Senkō) to freeze his opponents in suspended animation until his own death. He was voiced by Mikio Terashima and first appeared in episode 2 of Ultraman.
- Mon-star Monster Mosmanda (モンスター怪獣 ミコノス, Monsutā Kaijū Mikonosu; 8): (Note: Written as Mikonos in the magazines.) A space monster brought from Planet Abott (アボット星, Abotto Sei) to Earth by Alien Baltan's saucer. (Note: According to the 2001 magazine, its true origin is "unknown".) Its true purpose was to act as a bait for Hikari to transform into Joneus and had their fight recorded under Alien Baltan in human form. Once Mosmanda's deed was done, it received Joneus's Premium Beam.
- Brain Monster Dolfiego (頭脳怪獣 ドルフィーゴ, Zunō Kaijū Dorufīgo; 9): The endling of a monster species from 12 million years, who was respected by the ancient people of Tamara Island (タマラ島, Tamara-jima), situated next to the Easter Island in South Pacific. 6,000 years later, Dolfiego awakened when its resting place was intruded by a group of archaeologists and brainwashed three members into its personal slave. Due to being disturbed by human activities on the surface, it sent the brainwashed victims to destroy the excavation site, a ship and a power station. Hikari managed to negotiate with the monster, but his efforts went in vain when Science Guard detonated the temple to save the brainwashed victims, who were returned to normal. Dolfiego surfaced as it fought against Joneus and was killed with the Tamara Island sank into the ocean.
- Teleport Monster Zarrom (テレポート怪獣 ザローム, Terepōto Kaijū Zarōmu; 10): (Note: Depending on the magazine, its name in romanization could either be "Xalome" or "Zaromu".) A quadrupedal monster from Zarrom Desert (ザローム砂漠, Zarōmu Sabaku), it obtain the ability to pseudo-teleport its illusion after merging with George Satake and materialized at the magician's own stage in Japan. The next day, Zarrom went to Satake's household and used the illusion again to lure the SDS somewhere else until Joneus shrank himself to put Zarrom into suspended animation and used the Ultra Barrier Case to decompose it to cellular levels to save Satake before bringing the monster somewhere else.
- Liquid life-form Amoeba (液状生命体 液体怪獣, Ekijō Seimei-tai Ekitai Kaijū; 11): (Note: Depending on the magazine, its name in romanization could also either be "Liquid M." or "Liquid Monster". The subtitle Liquid life-form (液状生命体, Ekijō Seimei-tai) is written on the 2001 Ultraman Dictionary, whereas the "Tsuburaya All Monster Photobook" described said subtitle as its true name.) Liquid-like life forms from the cave beneath the Himalayas which could hijack machines. When Ogawara try to attack them, they hijacked Hector to attack the nearby village as a portion of them possessed Pig before Ogawara and Marume purged them out. After removing them from Hector by heating the mech itself, Joneus incinerate them with Premium Beam.
  - Machine Monster Hector (機械怪獣 ヘクトール, Kikai Kaijū Hekutōru; 11): (Note: Depending on the magazine, its name in romanization could also be "Hectole" or "Hectall".) Originally Bulldozer Weapon Hector (ブルドーザー兵器 ヘクトール, Burudōzā Heiki Hekutōru) that was built by former Earth Self-Defense Army member Daisuke Ogawara after it was denied by said group due to the inactivity of monster attacks at the time. Ogawara built it in the Himalayas as an anti monster mech but was possessed by the amoeba into attacking the nearby village. It was destroyed by Super Maddock when it heated the giant bulldozer to purge the amoeba out.
- Cohabitation Monster Oputo (同居怪獣 オプト, Dōkyo Kaijū Oputo; 12): (Note: Depending on the magazine, its name in romanization could either be "Opt" or "Oputo".) A trio of sibling monsters Chou (チョウ, Chō), Jin (ジン) and San (サン) living under the same hermit shell from West Pacific. (Note: Chou and Jin's names are written as "Cho" and "Zin".) Originally peaceful sea creatures, they were mutated into monsters when human activities invaded their territory and caused them to be cut off from available food supplies. Chou and Jin became five-horned flame breathing and twin-horned solution spraying monsters while San relatively remain its original face due to its grief over the elder brothers. The two would attack various tanker ships to feed oil before marching their way to Tokyo Bay and sleep during the night. San managed to negotiate with Pig and the SDS to give the former a chance in convincing its brothers to left Earth but was knocked down when Chou and Jin contempt to continue marching towards metropolis. As Joneus was forced to kill the elder Oputo brothers, San grew his horns and try to avenge them but died from his injuries. Its body was brought to the depths Antarctic ocean as San's final resting place.
- Sonic Monster Garadoras (音波怪獣 ガラドラス, Onpa Kaijū Garadorasu; 13): (Note: Depending on the magazine, its name in romanization could either be "Garadras" or "Garadoras".) An ancient monster who had once attack both forces of combatants nearby the Lake Ryūjin (龍神湖, Ryūjinko) after grieving for the losses of a pair of star-crossed lovers. Ever since then, the nearby villagers would perform an annual fete to quell Garadoras's anger. In the present day, Earth Self Defense Army mechanic Kinoshita asked Marume and Hikari's help in his village's fete when news of petrified fishes reached him. Unfortunately a group of researchers who operated at that lake were instantly petrified and so did Kinoshita, his grandmother and Marume when the helicopter's noise interrupted Garadoras. Joneus fought and destroy Garadoras with Premium Beam before returning its victims to normal. Befitting its subtitle, Garadoras can spew a petrifying sonic that turned its victims' flesh into stone.
- Flame Monster Geron (火焔怪獣 ゲロン, Kaen Kaijū Geron; 14): (Note: Depending on the magazine, its name in romanization could either be "Guellon" or "Geron".) A giraffe-like monster that resembles the Ultraman monster Dodongo and can exhale flames. Originally a benevolent monster, Geron was among the worldwide creatures influenced by the living fossil's presence that caused them to run amok. While rampaging in an oil refinery, Geron was killed by the firepower of Badei and Super Maddock.
- Volcano Monster Gadon (火山怪獣 ガドン, Kazan Kaijū Gadon; 14): One of the monsters that went berserk from the living fossil's presence. Gadon emerged from a volcano and attacked the Super Maddock during its journey to outer space before Joneus threw the monster into an active volcano. Gadon's main ability is to fly at the speed of Mach 5.
- Living Fossil (岩石生物, Ganseki Seibutsu; 14): (Note: "岩石生物" is the in-series term called by Marume, the creature itself lacking an official name. In the magazine, it is either called as "Asteroid Creature" (小惑星生物, Shōwakusei Seibutsu) or the Devil Planet (悪魔の星, Akuma no Hoshi).) A sentient celestial body that flew past the Earth in its route, but its sole presence emits radioactive waves that can cause reptiles and monsters to become aggressive. When Earth Self-Defense Army try to destroy it with several missile, the living fossil created Zaikuron from surplus energy source as its guardian. After Zaikuron's defeat, the living fossil was killed by Joneus's Ultra Body Screw and Super Maddock's missiles.
  - Space Monster Zaikuron (宇宙怪獣 ザイクロン, Uchū Kaijū Zaikuron; 14): (Note: Depending on the magazine, its name in romanization could either be "Zyclon" or "Zaikuron".) A monster created by the living fossil as its guardian to defend from incoming missile attacks. Aside from eye beams, it can also exhale 800 million lava and unleash 700 million volts of electricity discharges. Joneus fought the monster but the living fossil severely drained his energy, forcing him to recharge with the sunlight and grew 120 meters. Using this opportunity, Joneus used the Ultra Body Screw to destroy Zaikuron and penetrate across the core of the living fossil.
- Meteorite Beast Goglan (いん石獣 ゴグラン, Inseki-jū Goguran; 15): (Note: Depending on the magazine, its name in romanization could either be "Goglan" or "Goguran".) Small space insects whose eggs were among the asteroid showers that hit the Space Station EGG3. A caterpillar-state Goglan was slipped into the space station and destroyed by Hikari when it try to eat the generator, which would have claimed the lives of all crew members. This act of heroism was observed by Joneus from afar, and since then chose Hikari as his host. In the present day, another Goglan egg made its way to Tsukuba Plant Research Institute. Mistaken as a plant seed, they radiate it with radioactive and it quickly grew to monstrous size even in its caterpillar state. After accidentally detonating an oil tank, Goglan transformed into a giant butterfly as Joneus killed it with Premium Beam.
- Young Bird More (幼鳥 モア, Yōchō Moa; 16): A strange-looking Moa bird with smaller wings on its chest, More was about the size of a chicken and flew alongside a flock of birds at the sea. It accidentally crashed a luxury cruise and was taken care by a vet per Mutsumi's wish.
  - Ancient Strange Bird Kingmore (古代怪鳥 キングモア, Kodai Kaichō Kingumoa; 16): (Note: Written as King More in the magazines.) As a result of a veterinarian treating More with defibrillation, it grew to the size exceeding giant moa and flew from the cruise ship. The Kingmore would attack an oil tanker and chase the Super Maddock to catch Mutsumi, having infatuated to her. After a brief fight, Joneus shrunk the Kingmore to its original size as it went back to find a new home.
- Insect Beast Badan (こん虫獣 バダン, Konchū-jū Badan; 17): A giant grasshopper from African desert area. It flew with a swarm of grasshoppers, creating a typhoon that struck Japan and later on Egypt. During that moment, Badan attacked Tobe's Betamy and later on try to eat the Super Maddock until Joneus came to their aid. The ship itself blow freezing wind to save Joneus from the grasshoppers and him killing Badan with Premium Beam.
- Reef Monster Islanda (岩礁怪獣 アイランダ, Ganshō Kaijū Airanda; 18): A monster whose true form is part of the South Ukigo Island (南浮子島, Minami Uki-jima), Yuriko's hometown. Due to the mining activity, Islanda was provoked and attacked its inhabitants. Super Mardock fired a narcotic that caused Islanda to halt its attacks. With part of the South Ukigo Island removed, Islanda try to escape but was killed by Joneus's Premium Beam Cross Shoot.
- Another Dimension Monster Zamos (異次元怪獣 ザーモス, Ijigen Kaijū Zāmosu; 22): (Note: Depending on the magazine, its name in romanization could also either be "Saamoth" or "Zarmus".) A young bipedal monster from another dimension who accidentally arrived on Earth. Zamos's body possesses natural magnetic properties, causing him to use a barrier to contain it but said power leaked whenever he try to take a glimpse outside his barrier, causing ships to be accidentally absorbed into his barrier. After getting sucked into Zamos's barrier, Marume got to meet the monster in person and helped building a dimensional-compass to send the former back home. Unfortunately as the rest of the SDS felt suspicious of Marume's secretive behavior, they attacked the barrier with missiles and caused it to broke. Now exposed to the real world, Zamos rampaged in the coastal area before Joneus interfered, using the compass Marume created to send it back to its home dimension. He is voiced by Kenichi Ogata.
- High Speed Monster Zamba (高速怪獣 ザンバ, Kōsoku Kaijū Zanba; 23): An aerial monster from Andes that was the last of its five brethren left. Flying at the speed of Mach 6 to 8, it attacked multiple locations with light-reflecting surfaces. The monster targeted a refinery but an attempt by pilot Aoki and Hikari to intercept the beast went in failure as their jet are incapable of sustaining greater speed. Sometime later, their jet managed to intercept Zamba with a modified missile, as Joneus took over the battle by first drilling it with Ultra Body Screw and ended it with two shots of Premium Beam.
- Super-evolved Alien Princess of Alpha Kentauli First Planet (超進化宇宙人 アルファ・ケンタウリ第1惑星王女, Chō Shinka Uchūjin Arufa Kentauri Dai-ichi Wakusei Ōjo; 24): A rebellious princess who was tired of her job of visiting planets. Her race is a liquefied alien being who would take the appearance of the native of a planet they visited as their physical forms. During a visit to planet 427, her ship was attacked by assassins from the planet 5s. As their ship approaching the Solar System, she took an escape saucer and assumed the form of Mutsumi during her patrol. The princess would soon found herself followed by her loyal servant and the very same assassins that came after her. After being rescued by Joneus, the princess and her servant thanked the SDS as they left Earth. Due to copying Mutsumi's form, she is also voiced by Sumi Shimamoto.
  - Servant: The unnamed servant of said princess also arrived on Earth and took the form of a mountain climber. After a brief misunderstanding, the servant explained everything to the SDS but realized that the real princess (due to having copied Mutsumi) escaped with Hikari. He wielded a gun that spray sleeping gas. He was voiced by Masanobu Okubo.
- Planet Alpha Kentauli 5 Assassins (アルファ・ケンタウリ第5惑星の暗殺者, Arufa Kentauri Dai-go Wakusei no Asashin; 24): Unseen criminals from the fifth planet who try to assassinate the princess using Dragodos. The assassin themselves were killed in the ensuing destruction of their mechanical dragon.
- Space Dragon Dragodos (宇宙竜 ドラゴドス, Uchū Ryū Doragodosu; 24): (Note: Depending on the magazine, its name in romanization could also be either "Doragodos" or "Doragodus".) A spaceship that served as the fifth planet assassin's transportation. Its true form is a mechanical dragon which it transformed into once abducting the princess. With Joneus constricted, the Super Maddock saved him as the mechanical dragon exploded with its pilots by Joneus's Premium Beams. As its space dragon form, Dragodos can exhale 1.2 million°C flames and has a rotating buzzsaw at the end of its tail. It was designed by Minoru Kujirai under the impression of Space Dragon Nurse from Ultraseven.
- Poisonous Flower Monster Death-Baran (毒花怪獣 デスバラン, Doku Hana Kaijū Desu Baran; 25): (Note: Depending on the magazine, its name in romanization could also be either "Death-Balan" or "Dessbarun".) A green dinosaur monster with the legendary flower Death-Flower (デスフラワー, Desu Furawā) on the abdomen. Hiding in an ancient underground ruins, it secreted hallucinogenic pollen to several cities and lured its inhabitants to be eaten. Death-Baran was exposed when the SDS intruded its hideout and was defeated by Joneus's Premium Beam.
- Evil Monster Gibruga (凶悪怪獣 ギバルーガ, Kyōaku Kaijū Gibarūga; 26): (Note: On certain document, its name is also pronounced as Gilburga (ギルバーガ, Girubāga).) A malevolent parasite from the Earth's cavity that caused worldwide catastrophes by posing as the Earth's own will, all while using its vines to drain the planet for its nutrients. However, once its ruse was exposed, it went towards the surface and was killed by Joneus's Premium Beam. He is voiced by Shōzō Iizuka.
- Space Demon Baradon (宇宙悪魔 バラドン星人, Uchū Akuma Baradon Seijin; 27): (Note: In the magazine, their name is also Romanized as "Alien Baladon".) A team of green dwarf aliens that operated in the Baradon (小惑星バラドン, Shōwakusei Baradon; lit. 'Baladon Asteroid') and destroy multiple planets. While on its way to U-40, the seven Ultras' assault forced them to invade Earth instead and revive monsters as their advance guards. With their entire plan foiled by SDS, they escaped in a saucer to outer space but was intercepted by Joneus and seven other Ultras as they concentrate their beam on the ship, killing all known Baradon. They are voiced by Shōzō Iizuka and Shigeru Chiba.
- Monster Island residents (27): Since the Baradon had robbed and revived the deceased monsters from the Monster Graveyard, they were notable for being enemies of past Ultramen from previous live action Ultra Series. Despite this, neither of them participated in the Baradon's invasion campaign and fought among themselves.
  - Skull Monster Red King (どくろ怪獣 レッドキング, Dokuro Kaijū Reddo Kingu): The last monster to be released, who killed Ghostron and chased both Hikari and Marume when the two activated a bomb to destroy the Baradon asteroid's base. Joneus killed Red King by throwing it to the sky and sliced it with Boomerang Guillotine. Although first appeared in episode 8 of Ultraman, this Red King demonstrated the ability to exhale red rays (怪光線, Kaikōsen).
  - Blue Foam Monster Aboras (青色発泡怪獣 アボラス, Seishoku Happō Kaijū Aborasu) and Red Flame Monster Banila (赤色火焔怪獣 バニラ, Sekishoku Kaen Kaijū Banira): A pair monsters from episodes 19 of Ultraman. Although fighting each other due to being natural enemies, they teamed up with Red King and Gokinezura in against Joneus before being destroyed by his Premium Beam.
  - Berserk Monster Arstron (凶暴怪獣 アーストロン, Kyōbō Kaijū Āsutoron): A monster from episode 1 of Return of Ultraman, killed by Marume's bazooka.
  - Bomb Monster Ghostron (爆弾怪獣 ゴーストロン, Bakudan Kaijū Gōsutoron): From episode 8 of Return of Ultraman, it fought against two other monsters from its home season and was killed by Red King. In addition to its original Magma Ray (マグマ光線, Maguma Kōsen), this Ghostron can also unleash electrical discharge from its body.
  - Plastic Monster Gokinezura (プラスチック怪獣 ゴキネズラ, Purasuchikku Kaijū Gokinezura): From episode 22 of Return of Ultraman, it fought against other monsters of its home season but was killed in an attempt to fight Joneus while teaming up with Red King, Aboras and Banila. Different from its original counterpart, this Gokinezura has a morning star-like feature at the end of its tail.
- Combined Monster Dabaran (合体怪獣 ダバラン, Gattai Kaijū Dabaran; 28): A pair of space monsters, Fundus and Quaillas, crash-landed on Earth and combined into Dabaran. It managed to take down the Super Maddock and try to attack the vulnerable ship but Gondō managed to instruct the Science Guard members to get it work again. Joneus defeated it with Premium Beam as Dabaran exploded in the mid air.
  - Elephant Monster Fundus (象怪獣 ファンダス, Zō Kaijū Fandasu; 28): (Note: It was never named in-series and was called in the magazines as "Monster Elephant" or "Elephant Monster".) A three-legged mammoth monster that first appeared at the industrial site as the Science Guard froze it, however the monster was brought to a nearby forest than their base due to the new captain Gondō assumed it to be still alive. The next day, his intuition proves right as Fundus struggled to escape. When Quillas appeared, Tobe thawed Fundus from its ice prison in hopes for both monsters to fight each other but they combined into Dabaran.
  - Ptera Monster Quaillas (翼竜怪獣 クワァイラス, Yokuryū Kaijū Kuwāirasu; 28): (Note: Quaillas was never named in-series and referred to the magazines as either "Pterosaurs" (翼竜, Yokuryū) or "Putera Monster" (翼竜怪獣, Yokuryū Kaijū).) A flying monster that approached the melting Fundus as they combined into Dabaran.
- Invader Shadan (侵略星人 ジャダン, Shinryaku Seijin Jadan; 29): (Note: Depending on the magazine, its name in romanization could also be either "Jadan" or "Jyadan". Alternatively, they are also named as Alien Jadan (ジャダン星人, Jadan Seijin).) An army of invaders that targeted Earth and try to attack Ultraman Joneus, first by crippling the Far East Zone military base through their agents. Once the pair became Jagon and fought Joneus on Osaka, numerous Combat Saucer KILL (戦闘円盤キル, Sentō Enban Kiru) commanded by Commander Bore (ボア, Boa) launch their attack on Tokyo and tricked Joneus into exhausting himself over to defend both faraway cities at once. The arrival of Elec and Loto managed to even the odds as the Shadan forces try to escape Earth but was intercepted by all three Ultramen. Commander Bore is voiced by Shōzō Iizuka as the navigation operative in the Combat Saucer KILL is voiced by Ikuo Nishikawa.
  - Twin-Headed Monster Jagon (双頭怪獣 ジャゴン, Sōtō Kaijū Jagon; 29): (Note: Depending on the magazine, its name in romanization could either be "Jagon" or "Jugon".) A pair of Shadan agents Alpha and Beta escaped the Far East Zone base after sabotaging the main computer and combined into the twin headed monster Jagon. They proceed to lure Joneus into Osaka as their main leader attacked Tokyo to exhaust the Ultraman over saving both places until Elec and Loto joined the fray, forcing both Shadan and Jagon to escape until the trio of Ultra-Warriors destroyed their ship. They are voiced by Yumiko Sato and Shigeharu Matsuda.
- Bone Monster Skelldon (骨怪獣 スケルドン, Hone Kaijū Sukerudon; 30): (Note: Depending on the magazine, its name in romanization could either be "Skelldon" or "Sukerudon".) Originally the 600 million year old skeleton of an unknown species, having existed long before the dinosaur era. Its bones were assembled in a nearby museum but Skelldon gains sentience and rampaged across the city with its toxic breath, as well as reformatting itself upon receiving damages. It would retreat that night and hide into a nearby sewer as the Science Guard were investigating its actual origin. The day after that, Skelldon reappeared but the Science Guard managed to counter its use of poison gas. This time, the monster gained an additional ability to use its rib cage as makeshift boomerangs. Joneus appeared and froze the monster to detect its main weak point and strike it with two shots of Premium Beam before exhausting most of his energy supply.
- Dark Barberar Aliens (暗黒星人 バビラー, Ankoku Seijin Babirā; 32): (Note: Depending on the magazine, its name in romanization could also be eather "Babilar" or "Bavire". They are also named as Alien Babilar (バビラー星人, Babirā Seijin).) A race of nocturnal aliens who attempted to invade the Earth with their robot Megasauler. After losing Part No. 13 to Professor Nishiki, they tracked it to the SGS's base and reclaim it. Any notable Barberar was killed as they piloted the incomplete Megasauler through its activation period. They are voiced by Shigeru Chiba and Hiroshi Ōtake.
- Robo Monster Megasauler (ロボ怪獣 メガザウラ, Robo Kaijū Megazaura; 32): (Note: Depending on the magazine, its name in romanization could also be either "Megasaura" or "Megazaura".) The Barberar's invasion weapon, which scattered into several pieces upon atmospheric entry on Earth. They managed to obtain all pieces, save for the Part No. 13 which was in Professor Nishiki's possession while in his way to the Earth Self Defense Force's Far East headquarters. (Note: In the magazine, the "Part No. 13" is labelled as Parts Number 13: Emotional Circuit (パーツナンバー13・感情回路, Pātsu Nanbā Jūsan Kanjō Kairo).) This part was later reclaimed as Megasauler was activated and proceed to make its way towards the city. Guided by Nishiki's discovery, the SGS and Joneus were able to target its weak point as it blown into pieces from two shots of Premium Beams.
- Gathering Monster Gameba (集結怪獣 ガミバ, Shūketsu Kaijū Gamiba; 33): (Note: Its name in romanization is read as "Gamiba" in the magazines.) Slug-like creatures from underneath Maroi Island (マロイ島, Maroi-to), feeding on rocks which caused earthquakes on the surface. When the SGS boarded the Passenger II to investigate, they encountered these creatures and open fire, causing all of them to combine into a single mother monster, Gameba. Joneus fought and burned its left hand off in the magma, as both escaped and Gameba detonated as a result of swallowing the Ultra's Premium Beam.
- Space Pirate Invader People (宇宙海賊 インベド人, Uchū Kaizoku Inbedo-jin; 34, 35): (Note: Depending on the magazine, its name in romanization could also be either "Inbedian" or "Inved".) A team of aliens from dark nebula that had invaded Prison and caused it to go on a move towards Earth in 10 hours to invade it with the monster prisoners were used as their invasion forces. All of their forces were killed by Joneus, Elec and Loto.
- Monster prisoners: The prisoners of Prison (怪獣収容星プリズン, Kaijū Shūyō Boshi Purizun) held by U-40 until the Invader People released them as their army as invasion forces on Earth. Due to their invasion, Prison had activated its self destruct mode that would detonate half of the Earth until Elec and Loto arrived as they fix the planet's navigation system, allowing the artificial planet to explode somewhere else safely. The inhabitants reach a total of more than 50 monsters and each had the Space Monster (宇宙怪獣, Uchū Kaijū) prefix in their names:
  - Death Power (デスパワー, Desu Pawā), Groll (グロル, Guroru) and Zuuma (ズーマ, Zūma) (34): Background monster characters in the prison.
  - Putogoria (プトゴリア) and Idodzunos (イドヅノス, Idodzunosu) (35): A pair of monsters who chased after Tobe, Marume and two other astronauts on Prison. Putogoria was killed by their cannon whereas Idodzunos was taken care by Joneus.
  - Goadlian (ゴードリアン, Gōdorian; 34): (Note: Depending on the magazine, its name in romanization could either be "Goadlian" or "Godlian".) A dark blue bat monster from Planet Gordon (ゴードン星, Gōdon Sei) of the Dark Nebula. It was the first of Prison's inmates that escaped to Earth and defeated by Joneus, which caused the latter's energy to be exhausted.
  - Plazoon (プラズーン, Purazūn; 34, 35): (Note: Depending on the magazine, its name in romanization could either be "Plazoon" or "Prazoon".) A purplish monster with the ability to fire electromagnetic waves. It destroyed Tobe and Marume's Space Craft N3 and caused them to be stranded on Prison. Alongside Genario and Groteng, they were sent by the Invader People to attack Earth. Plazoon was sent back to Prison and were among the inhabitants to be killed in the resulting explosion.
  - Agjon (アグジョン, Agujon; 34, 35): (Note: Depending on the magazine, its name in romanization could either be "Agjon" or "Agjion".) A green frilled monster that was first seen fighting Groteng on Prison's surface and destroyed by Marume with a leftover cannon from N3's wreckage. Another one were among the Invader People's invasion monsters on Earth to be killed by Elec and Loto.
  - Genario (ジナリオ, Jinario; 34, 35): (Note: Depending on the magazine, its name in romanization could either be "Genario" or "Jinario".) A purple-horned monster that was first seen fighting Agjon on Prison's surface. Alongside Plazoon and Groteng, they were sent by the Invader People to attack Earth and defeated by Elec and Loto.
  - Groteng (グロテング, Gurotengu; 34, 35): A brown monster that was deployed alongside Genario and Plazoon by the Invader People to attack Earth and defeated by Elec and Loto.
- Swan Constellation Star 82 Alien (白鳥座82番星人, Shiratori-za Hachijū-Niban Seijin; 36):
  - Dr. Yunk (ユンク博士, Yunku Hakase): Noah's father, who was the head of the Space Energy Development Department. After their planet's sun, Star 32, begin to increase, the people of Star 82 of the Swan Constellation try to stabilize their hot environment. Yunk created the Freezer G energy rays, but it resulted in the creation of Darancheraous by accident. To counter the monster, he gave the Super Magma Capsule (スーパーマグマカプセル, Sūpā Maguma Kapuseru) to his daughter in his final breath. He was voiced by Takeo Ono.
  - Noah (ノア): The daughter of late Dr. Yunk, she try to search for Ultraman Joneus on Earth, due to the Super Magma Capsule requiring his energy to be activated. As Darancheraous chased her to Earth, she desperately try to search for any human but was mistaken for a Snow-queen until she came across Hikari. With Darancheraous defeated, Noah thanked Hikari and Joneus as she returns to her home planet. She is voiced by Mari Okamoto.
- Freezing Monster Darancheraous (氷結怪獣 ダランチュラス, Hyōketsu Kaijū Daranchurasu; 36): (Note: Depending on the magazine, its name in romanization could also be either "Darantulas" or "Tarantulas".) Originally a normal spider residing on Star 82 of the Swan Constellation, it was radiated with the Freezer G (フリーザーG, Furīzā Jī) energy rays which turned it into a giant monster with the ability to change the climate towards that of snowstorm through the Chilling Freezer (氷結フリーザー, Hyōketsu Furīzā) breath. It chased Noah to Earth due to her possession of Super Magma Capsule and subjugate almost the entire Japan with a snowstorm. Joneus was almost frozen by Darancheraous until the sun shines, allowing him to use the Super Magma Capsule onto himself and defeated the monster with his supercharged Premium Beam.
- Peaceful Alien Alien Oparenix Fedeligo (平和宇宙人 オペルニクス星人 フェデリコ, Heiwa Uchūbito Operunikusu Seijin Federiko; 40): (Note: His name is read in the magazine as "Fedelico".) A young boy who lost his parents to the Empire of Heller and was tricked by Roigar to command his monster Oloran on attacking Earth under the pretense that his planet Oparenix would be destroyed. After being tended by Mutsumi, Fedeligo was shocked to discover his Oloran being modified into an Empire of Heller monster weapon. After sustaining a shot from the Heller Soldiers and barely returning to Earth in a weakened state, Fedeligo told Hikari of Oloran's weak point in his dying breath. His funeral was made by the SDS as they eject his body to the outer space. He is voiced by Yōko Kuri.
- Pet Monster Oloran (ペット怪獣 オロラーン, Petto Kaijū Ororān; 40): (Note: Depending on the magazine, its name in romanization could also be either "Eurolan" or "Orolaan".) Fedeligo's pet monster with the ability to elongate itself, exhaling Freezing Gas (冷凍ガス, Reitō Gasu) and turn into a spherical saucer for transportation. It was kidnapped by the Empire of Heller after fleeing from Joneus from attacking the city.
  - Pet Monster Re-Oloran (ペット怪獣 改造オロラーン, Petto Kaijū Kaizō Ororān; 40): By placing a specialized machine that linked to its brain, Oloran was reconfigured into a monster weapon for the Empire of Heller's use and disobey Fedeligo. From the alien boy's guidance, Joneus destroyed Oloran by targeting the monster's leg, causing the machine to be ejected and dissipate into light.
- Space Hunter Hatari (宇宙ハンター ハタリ, Uchū Hantā Hatari; 42): An old man from Planet Maron (惑星マロン, Wakusei Maron) who made his reputation as a monster hunter in Andromeda. Roigar and the rest of the Empire of Heller deceive him into capturing Ultraman Joneus. Hatari rides an old space battleship which resembles a moving island on the equator. Unaware to him, his "crew members" were in fact soldiers of the Empire of Heller who obey his orders until they kill him should Joneus be captured. He saved Mutsumi after accidentally crashing into a nearby ship, the latter trying to warn him of Roigar's trap. When Joneus was trapped by the ship, the Empire of Heller try to kill both Hatari and the former until Mutsumi saved them as they escaped with a smaller jet. After the army was killed by Joneus, Hatari decides to retire from his monster hunting career and bids farewell to the SDS as he returns to space. He was voiced by Tarō Sagami II.
