= Konstantin Mikhailovich Kuzginov =

Soviet painter and designer (born 1913)

Konstantin Mikhailovich Kuzginov, born 22 December 1913 near Saransk, is a Soviet painter and designer.

His most famous works were for the 1957 6th World Festival of Youth and Students held in Moscow.

== Life ==
Kuzginov's father, Mikhail Vasilievich Kuzginov, was a provincial Russian teacher. Upon his death, Kuzginov's family moved to Moscow. In the pre–World War II years, Kuzginov completed a training course with the Factory and Plant Vocational School and worked as a smith. He maintained an interest in the arts, further finishing a course with the fine-arts studio at the Zuev Club, a course affiliated with the Malyutin Factory for admission to university, and then the Moscow Art College.

In 1941, Kuzginov was drafted into the Soviet Army. Kuzginov was athletic and had a history of wrestling, and so he joined the Stalin Institute's sports department, and later the Arzamas Machine Gun and Mortar Cadet College, where he taught physical training. Serving later with the Second Byelorussian Army, he ended the war in Stettin as a lieutenant.

Post-war, he collaborated with many Moscow publishing houses, also joining the Moscow Union of Artists. In 1948, Kuzginov started working with the All-Union Chamber of Commerce, producing many panels for international exhibitions in Germany, France, Italy, Finland, and India. Kuzginov designed brochures, catalogues, and worked with the monthly magazines Znanie-Sila and Murzilka.

He also designed posters, with six of them sent to the 4th and 6th World Festivals of Youth and Students. In particular, he is noted as the designer of the logo for the latter event, known as the Festival Daisy, which was approved by the Vienna Congress of the World Federation for Democratic Youth for all later forums.

Kuzginov was elected in 1958 as a People's Deputy from the Sverdlovsk District Council of Moscow.

One of his daughters, Lyubov Konstantinovna Azhaeva-Borisova, is also an artist working with painting and graphic media.
