= Plasma deep drilling technology =

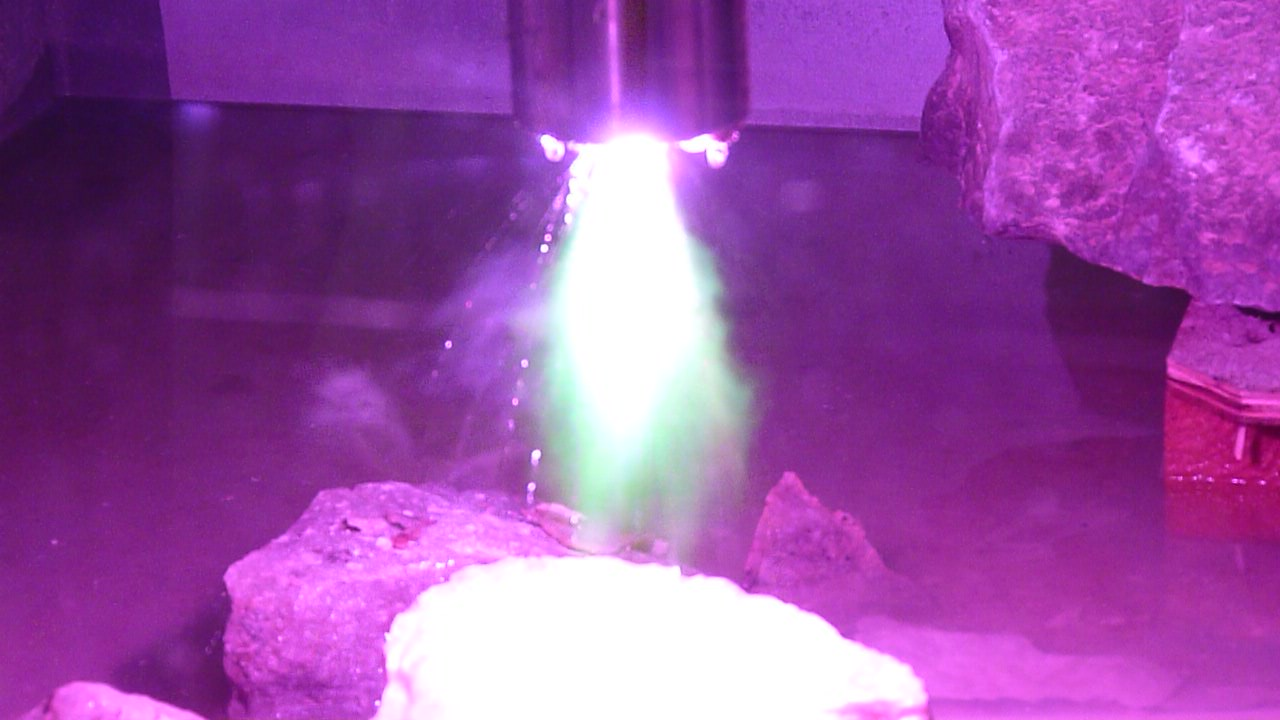
Plasmatorch using water steam as plasma-creation gas

Plasma deep drilling technology is one of several drilling technologies that may be able to replace conventional, contact-based rotary systems. These new technologies include plasma deep drilling, water jet, hydrothermal spallation and laser. Companies that embrace plasma-drilling method include GA Drilling, headquartered in Bratislava, Slovakia.

== High-energy plasma ==
High-energy plasma is a technology that targets deep drilling applications. It addresses issues related to drilling in water environments or boreholes with varying diameters.

== Physical principle of electrical plasma ==
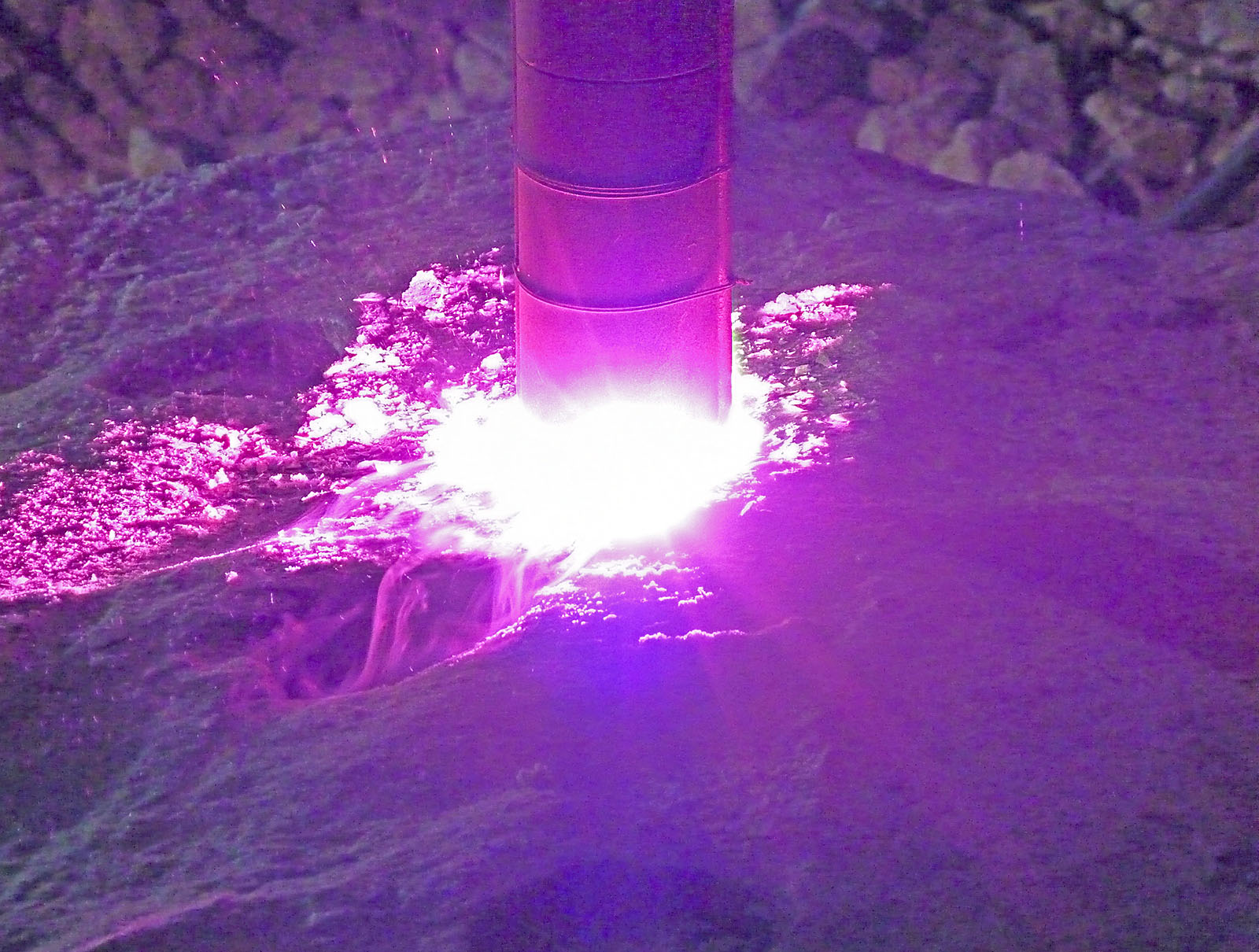
Drilling using electrical plasma

An electric arc is a breakdown of a gas that produces a plasma discharge, resulting from a current flowing through normally nonconductive media such as air or another gas. An arc discharge is characterized by a lower voltage than a glow discharge, and relies on thermionic emission of electrons from the electrodes supporting the arc. The electric arc is influenced by factors such as: the gas flow, inner and outer magnetic fields, and construction elements of the chamber that confines the arc. The development of plasma torches to be used as a source of the thermal plasma demands a deep understanding of the discharge chamber processes.

== Advantages ==
1. Higher drilling energy efficiency
2. Continuous drilling without replacement of mechanical parts
3. Constant casing diameter
4. Effective transport of disintegrated rock

== See also ==
- GA Drilling
- New drilling technologies
- Drilling rig
- List of geological modelling software
- List of mining journals
- List of plasma physics software
- Underground rocket
- Quaise
- Oil well
- Research Centre for Deep Drilling
