= Science and Life =

Science and Life may refer to:

- Science and Life (Russian) (Nauka i Zhizn), a Russian science magazine
- Science & Vie, a French science magazine
- Science and Life (book), a 1920 book by Frederick Soddy
