= Okhotnikov =

Okhotnikov, feminine: Okhotnikov is a Russian patronymic surname derived from the nickname Okhotnik, hunter, volunteer/military volunteer. Notable people with the surname include:

- Aleksey Okhotnikov (1780–1807), Russian cavalry guards officer, secret lover of Russian Empress Elizabeth Alexeievna
- Nikolay Okhotnikov (1937–2017), Soviet operatic singer and musical teacher
- Vadim Okhotnikov (1905–1964), Soviet science fiction writer, engineer and inventor
