= Research Centre for Deep Drilling =

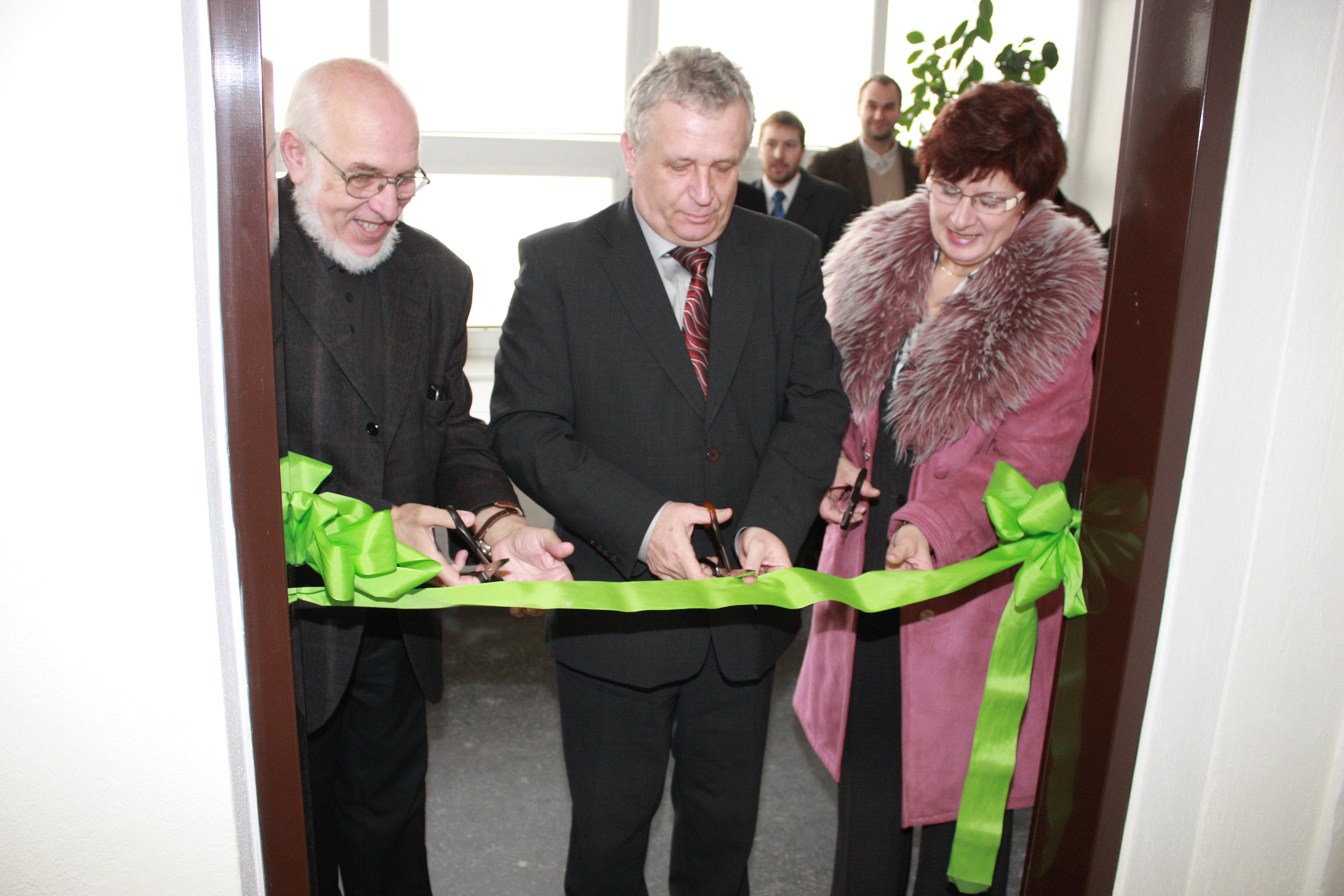
Official opening of Research Centre, from left to right: Ivan Kocis (Chief scientist at Geothermal Anywhere, Jaromir Pastorek (President of SAS) and Marta Cimbakova (deputy General Director of S&T Department, Ministry of Education of Slovak Republic)

Research Centre for Deep Drilling is high-tech laboratory focused on research and development of new deep drilling concept based on electrical plasma. It was established by GA Drilling, former Geothermal Anywhere company in the premises of Slovak Academy of Sciences in Bratislava, Slovakia. The Research centre was officially opened on 10 October 2010 as a result of long-term activities whose aim is to support the geothermal technology research and development in Slovakia. In October 2012, GA Drilling officially moved from Research Center for Deep Drilling to newly founded GA Drilling Technology Center.

== High-energetic electrical plasma ==
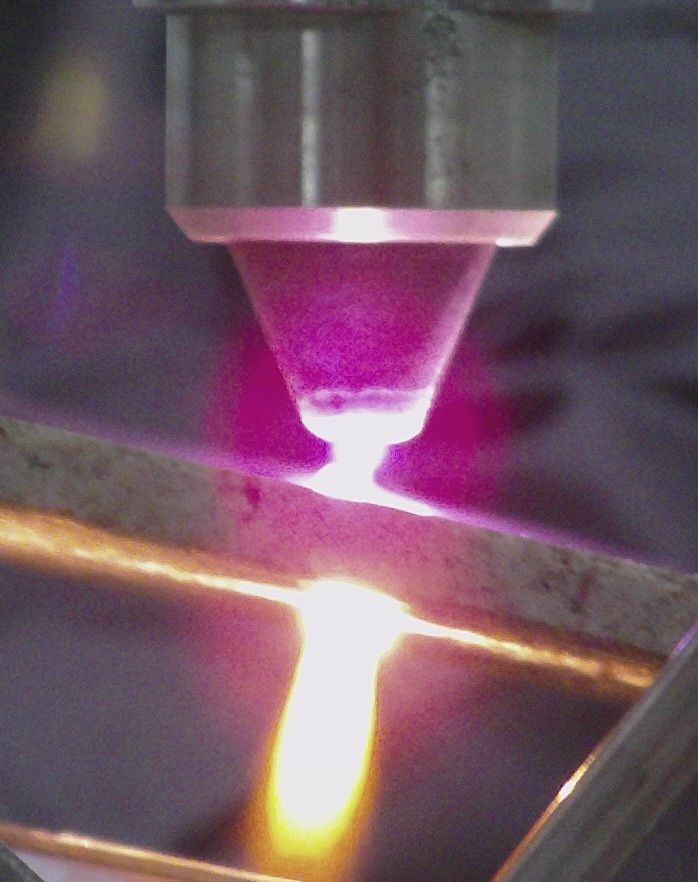
Drilling using high energetic electrical plasma in Research Centre for Deep Drilling in Bratislava

High-energetic electrical plasma is a promising technology which is currently being developed in deep drilling applications. It has lower energy efficiency than some of the other technologies, but has several other advantages. The most important are utilization in water environment or producing boreholes with wide range of diameters. The research team from Slovakia is developing drilling concept based on electrical plasma principle suitable for several drilling applications. The core of the research is held in Research Centre for Deep Drilling.

== See also ==
- Plasma (physics)
- Enhanced geothermal system
- Plasma deep drilling technology
- Geothermal Anywhere
- New drilling technologies
- Plasma deep drilling technology
