= Vadim Okhotnikov =

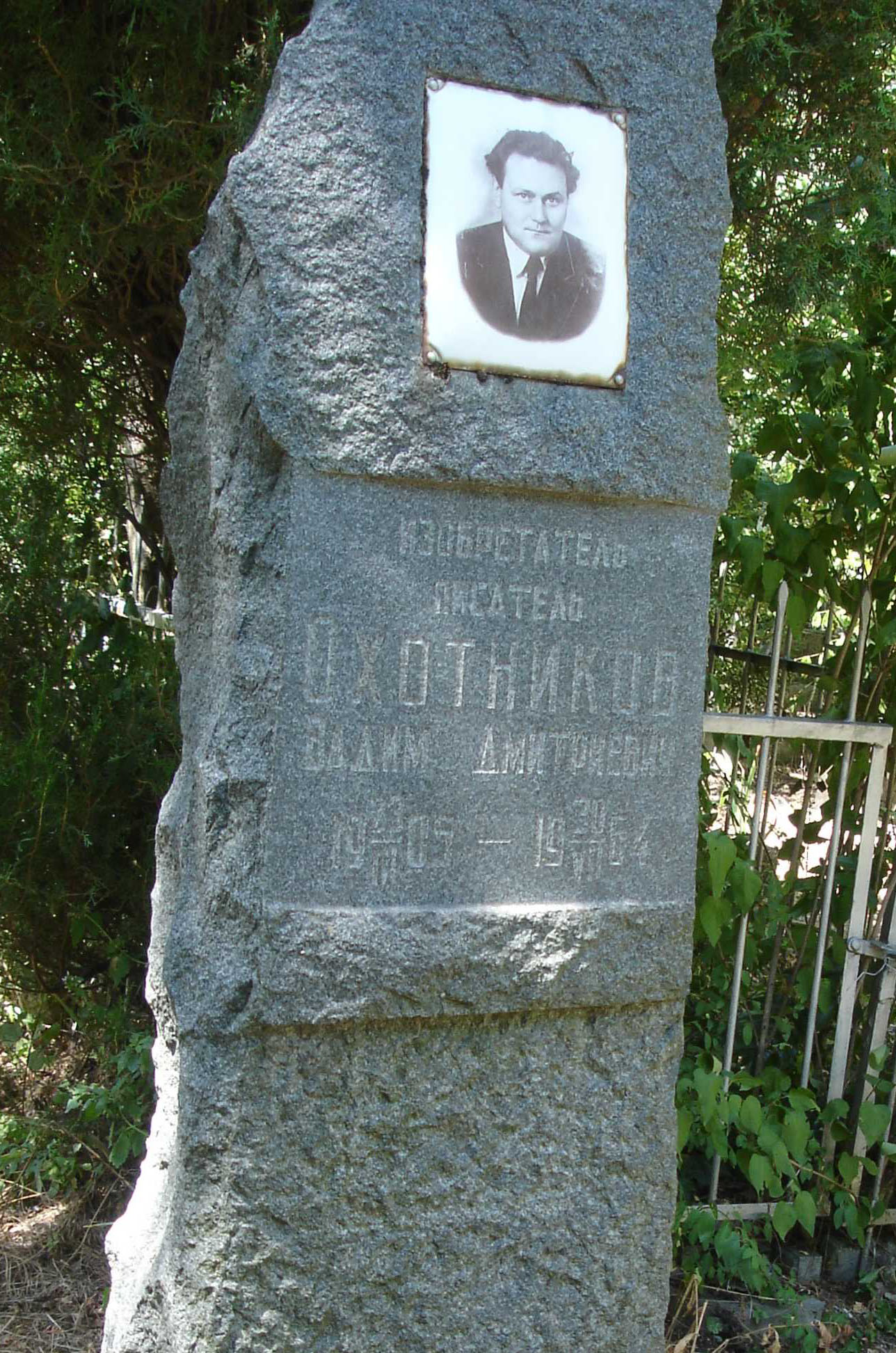
A monument at the Stary Krym cemetery

Vadim Dmitrievich Okhotnikov (March 23, 1905 – July 31, 1964) was a Soviet science fiction and popular science writer, engineer, and inventor.

== Biography ==
He was born in the town of Yelets, then in Oryol Governorate, Russian Empire.

Among his inventions is the development of a Soviet system of optical sound recording.

He was awarded the honorary title of Honored Worker in Science and Engineering

In 1946 he was appointed scientific editor of the popular science magazine for youth Tekhnika Molodezhi.

He was married to the children's writer Valentina Oseyeva.

== Works of fiction ==
In his works of hard science fiction he popularized of his own scientific and engineering ideas.

=== Novels ===
- 1947: В глубь земли, Vokrug Sveta, 1947. No. 8. pp. 45–51; No. 9. pp. 38–44; No. 10. pp. 53–57; No. 11. pp. 55–60.
- 1949: Пути-дороги
- 1949: Тайна карстовой пещеры
- 1950: Дороги вглубь, М.ː Molodaya Gvardiya, 1950. — 187 p.
- 1953: Первые дерзания
- 1957: Наследники лаборанта Синявина

=== Stories and collections ===
- В мире исканий, novels and short stories. — М.ː Detgiz, 1949. — 336 p.
- История одного взрыва, short story //На грани возможного: Сб. НФ. — Горький: Кн. изд-во, 1950. pp. 301–330.
- Покорители земных недр, short story // Znanie - Sila, 1948. No. 10. pp. 23–26.
- Разговор по существу, short story // Tekhnika Molodezhi, 1946. No. 4. pp. 22–24.
- Шорохи под землёй, short story // Vokrug Sveta, 1947. No. 1. С. 36–40.
- Электрические снаряды, short story // Tekhnika Molodezhi, 1946. No. 5-6. pp. 30–32; No. 7. pp. 25–27.
