= Tesco Corporation =

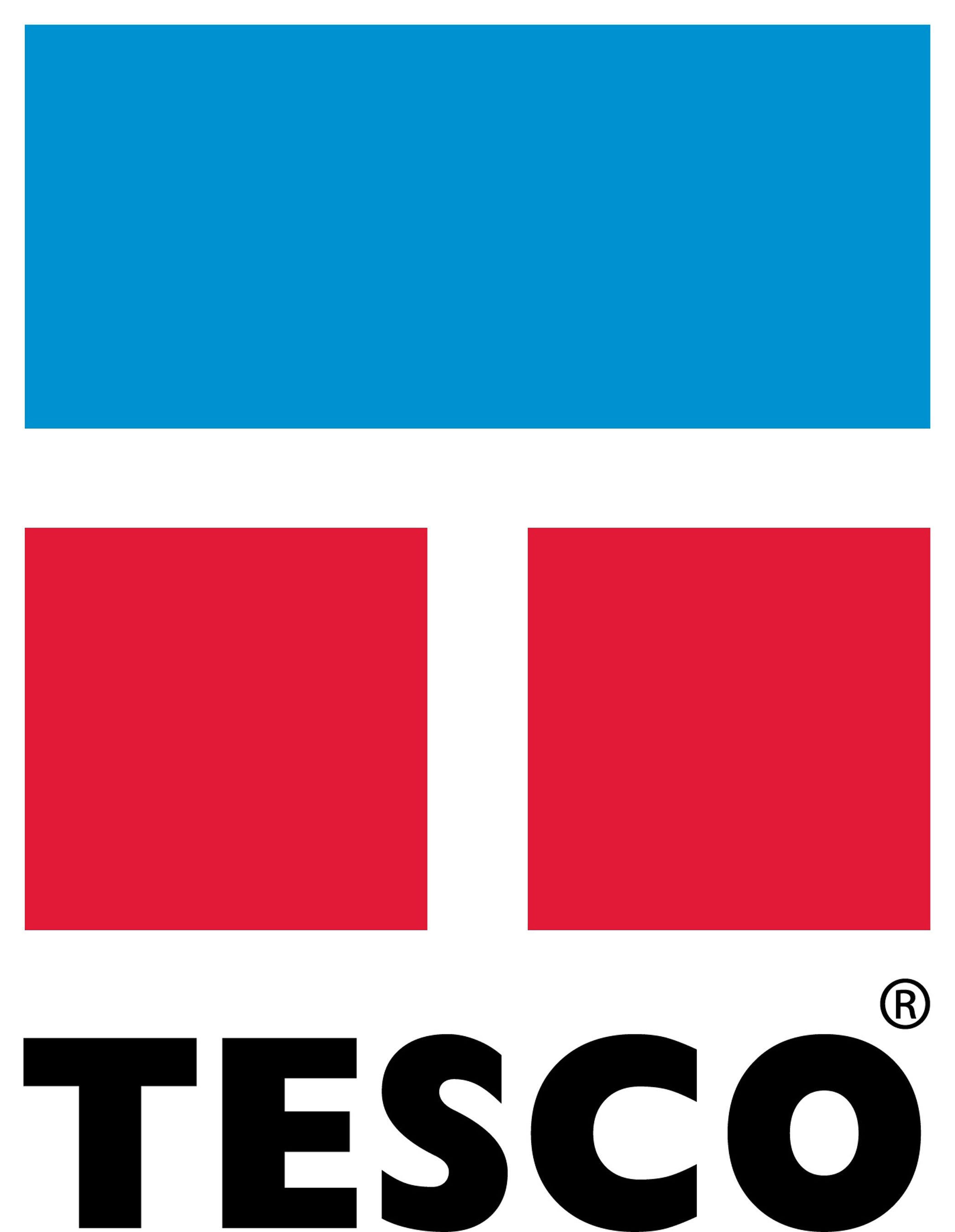
- Company type: Defunct
- Industry: Oilfield Services
- Founded: December 1, 1993; 32 years ago, Calgary, Alberta, Canada
- Founder: Robert Tessari
- Defunct: December 15, 2017; 8 years ago
- Fate: Acquired by Nabors Industries
- Headquarters: Houston, Texas, United States
- Key people: Fernando R. Assing, President & CEO
- Revenue: ▼$134 million (2016)
- Net income: ▲ -$117 million (2016)
- Total assets: ▼$344 million (2016)
- Total equity: ▼$309 million (2016)
- Number of employees: 1,215 (2016)

Tesco Corporation was an oilfield services company that provided top drive rental services on a day-rate basis for land and oil platforms as well as casing running. It was headquartered in Spring Branch, Houston. In December 2017, the company was acquired by Nabors Industries.

== History ==
The company traces its routes to a company founded in 1986 by Robert Tessari.

On December 1, 1993, Tesco Corporation was formed through the amalgamation of Shelter Oil and Gas Ltd., Coexco Petroleum Inc., Forewest Industries Ltd. and Tesco Corporation. The company also became a public company.

In 1994, Tesco's portable land top drive won a Special Meritorious Award for Engineering at the Offshore Technology Conference show.

In 1995, the company opened a sales office in Beijing.

In 2002, the company acquired Bo Gray Casing Co. and A&M Tubular Maintenance for $10.5 million.

In 2006, the company moved its headquarters from Calgary to Houston, while continuing to manufacture in Calgary.

In 2011, the company acquired Premiere Casing Services - Egypt S.A.E.

In 2012, Tesco sold its CASING DRILLING™ division to Schlumberger for $45 million.

In 2013, the company acquired automated catwalk technology from Custom Pipe Handlers Canada.

In 2014, the company acquired Tech Field Services.

In August 2014, Judge Keith P. Ellison of Houston Texas dismissed with prejudice a lawsuit in which Tesco had been suing several competitors for infringement of US patent 7140443, "Pipe Handling Device, Method and System". Glenn A. Ballard Jr. of global law firm Bracewell & Giuliani was rebuked for lying to the court.

In December 2014, Fernando Assing was appointed President and CEO of the company.

In December 2017, the company was acquired by Nabors Industries.
