= Subterrene =

Vehicle that moves through solid rock or soil

Trebelev subterrene (Soviet Union)

A subterrene (Latin: subterrina, Russian: Подземная лодка), alternatively subterrine, is a vehicle that travels underground (through solid rock or soil) much as a submarine travels underwater, either by mechanical drilling, or by melting its way forward. Subterrenes existed first in fiction as mechanical drillers, with real-world thermal designs and examples following in the second half of the 20th century.

Fictional subterrenes are often depicted as cylindrical in shape with conical drill heads at one or both ends, sometimes with some kind of tank-tread for propulsion, and described either as leaving an empty tunnel behind them, or as filling the space behind it with mining debris, as is the case with the Mole from the British puppet TV series Thunderbirds. The plausibility of such machines has declined with the advent of the real-world tunnel boring machines, which demonstrate the reality of the boring task. Tunnel boring machine themselves are not usually considered to be subterrenes, possibly because they lack the secondary attributes – mobility and independence – that are normally applied to vehicles.

A real-world, mobile subterrene must work thermally, using very high temperature and immense pressure to melt and push through rock. The front of the machine is equipped with a stationary drill tip which is kept at 700–930 °C (1,300–1,700 °F). The molten rock is pushed around the edges as the vehicle is forced forward, and cools to a glass-like lining of the tunnel. Massive amounts of energy are required to heat the drill head, supplied via nuclear power or electricity. Patents issued in the 1970s indicate that U.S. scientists had planned to use nuclear power to liquefy lithium metal and circulate it to the front of the machine (drill). An onboard nuclear reactor can permit a truly independent subterrene, but cooling the reactor is a difficult problem.

Online information presents research that was funded by the United States Government for the Los Alamos Scientific Laboratories University of California, Los Alamos, New Mexico for a project Camelot under the heading Systems and Cost Analysis for a Nuclear Subterrene Tunneling Machine. A patent was subsequently issued under number 3,693,731 on 26 September 1972.

The design concepts fall into similar designs of current technology of the nuclear submarine fleet and existing tunnel boring technology as used in the Channel Tunnel between England and France, but with the added feature of melting rock for the tunnel wall lining.

== Advantages ==
- In theory, tunnels can be built much more cheaply and quickly because of their reduced complexity, equipment costs and operational overhead.
- A smooth glass-lined tunnel wall is created as a result of the process. This can further reduce costs and provides an insulating barrier and basic support structure.

== Disadvantages ==
- These machines inherently use a very large amount of energy.
- Unknown safety and performance records
- The soil still has to be removed from the tunnel.

== See also ==
- Cultivator No. 6
- The Mole (Thunderbirds)
- Underground rocket
- Tunnel boring machine
