= Nauka i Zhizn =

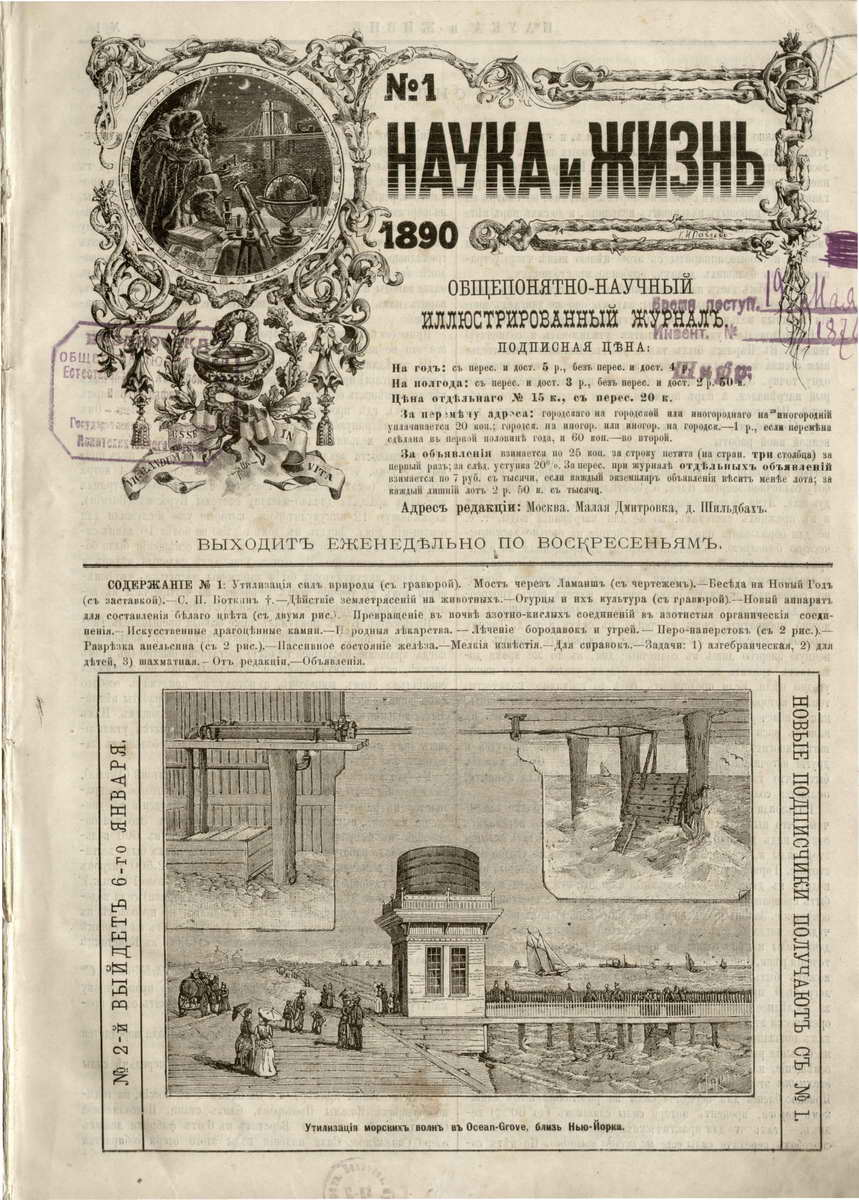
- First issue (1890)
- Categories: Popular science
- Founded: 1890
- Country: Russia
- Based in: Moscow
- Language: Russian
- Website: http://www.nkj.ru
- ISSN: 0028-1263
- OCLC: 145394638

Nauka i Zhizn (Science and Life, Russian: Наука и жизнь) is a science magazine first issued during the years 1890–1900 in Russian Empire, and then since 1934 in the Soviet Union (and continued in the Russian Federation today).

== See also ==
- Tekhnika Molodezhi "Technology for the Youth"
- Znanie — Sila "Knowledge is Power"
