= Quaise =

Millimeter-wave drilling technology to access geothermal energy

Quaise, Inc
- Industry: Geothermal power
- Founded: 2018
- Founder: Carlos Araque, Matt Houde, Aaron Mandell
- Headquarters: Cambridge, Massachusetts, United States
- Key people: Carlos Araque, chief executive officer
- Products: Millimeter-wave drilling
- Number of employees: 20+
- Website: quaise.energy

Quaise, Inc is developing a millimeter-wave drilling system for converting existing power stations to use superdeep geothermal energy. The system would repurpose existing gyrotron technology to drill 20 kilometers beneath the surface, where temperatures exceed 400 °C. No fracking would be required, avoiding the potential for earthquakes that have occurred in other geothermal systems. Drilling using this technique is hoped to be fast, with boreholes aimed to be completed in 100 days using existing 1MW gyrotrons. To reduce costs and delays, the company planned to establish its wells on the sites of existing power plants.

By 2026, the company hopes to have achieved 100MW of geothermal power output. By 2028, Quaise aims to have converted an existing fossil-fueled power plant to run on geothermal steam.

== History ==
Quaise was founded in 2018. In October 2021, Quaise began initial testing of gyrotron boring at Oak Ridge National Laboratory and planned to have a full-scale drilling rig completed by 2024. It closed a $21 million in Series A1 financing in 2024. In 2025, it announced the completion of a test well that reached a depth of 100 metres (330 ft).

== Technology ==
Existing geothermal power stations can only be deployed in rare locations where adequate heat is located within 3 km of the surface. These resources are of a comparatively low temperature, and require seismically risky stimulation techniques. Further, drilling at these depths is expensive and slow.

Instead, Quaise plans to drill quickly using a gyrotron and waveguide, vaporizing the rock by heating it. Temperatures at 20 km depth are above the supercritical point of water, which allows ten times more energy to be transferred given the same volumetric flow. The supercritical water is then used in a supercritical steam generator which may previously have been powered with fossil fuels.

== Comparison with other power sources ==
The approach proposes advantages compared with other power sources:

- Constant 24-hour generation – Maximum output always available. Does not require storage. Wind and Solar are intermittent generators.
- Small land footprint – Consumes less than 1% of the land area of wind or solar for the same maximum output.

== See also ==
- Plasma deep drilling technology
- Geothermal energy in the United States
- GA Drilling
- Eavor Technologies
- Fervo Energy
- AltaRock Energy
