= Znanie – Sila =

Soviet and Russian popular science magazine

- Frequency: Monthly
- Circulation: 3000 (2022)
- First issue: January 1926
- Country: Soviet Union; Russia
- Based in: Moscow
- Language: Russian
- ISSN: 0130-1640

Fonts of the title Знание-сила in various years

Znanie — Sila (Russian: Знание-сила, Knowledge is Power) is a monthly illustrated popular science magazine for youth. It publishes popular articles in various areas of science and science fiction stories.

The title is the aphorism Scientia potentia est in Russian.

== History ==
Circulation chart of the magazine

It was established in January 1926, targeting teenagers. The first issue of this magazine was published by "Molodaya Gvardiya" publishing house in Moscow.

In 1928, the coverage of life sciences was transferred to the new magazine Young Naturalist, while the rest of the sciences continued to be covered by Knowledge is Power.

On June 22, 1941, the Axis invasion of the USSR began. The number of newspapers and magazines in the country was reduced, and in 1942-1945 the magazine was on hiatus. Since January 1946, the target audience also included young adults.

It circulation reached its peak of 700,000 in 1967.

In 1968 the magazine was transferred to the "Znanie" society. In 1972, the magazine's circulation was 500,000 per month. This magazine was printed by a printing plant in the town Chekhov. The circulation of this magazine in 1983 was 620,000 copies.

After the collapse of the Soviet Union and the loss of state patronage the staff of the magazine and its circulation were severely trimmed.

== See also ==
- Nauka i Zhizn (Science and Life)
- Tekhnika Molodezhi (Technology for the Youth)
- Юный техник (Young Technician)
