= Tekhnika Molodezhi =

Russian popular engineering magazine

Техника — молодёжи
- Categories: Popular science and technology
- First issue: 1933
- Country: Russia
- Language: Russian

Tekhnika Molodezhi (Russian: Техника — молодёжи, "Technology for the Youth") is a Soviet, and eventually Russian popular science magazine that also included literary works, in particular, science fiction. It has been published monthly since 1933.

== History and profile ==
Tekhnika Molodezhi was established in 1933. During the Soviet era, it was often the first publisher of foreign science fiction authors in the USSR. The magazine had a science fiction section.

== See also ==
- Nauka i Zhizn (Science and Life)
- Znanie – Sila "Knowledge is Power"
