= GA Drilling =

Drilling technology company

- Type: Private
- Industry: Geothermal energy, oil and gas drilling
- Founded: 2008
- Founder: Igor Kocis, Tomas Kristofic (CTO), Dusan Kocis (COO), Ivan Kocis (Chief Scientist)
- Headquarters: Bratislava, Slovakia
- Area served: Global
- Key people: Antony Branch (CEO); Liam Lines (Chief Engineering Officer); Matus Gajdos (Head of Product); Michal Novovesky (Chief Growth Officer)
- Products: NexTitan
- Website: www.gadrilling.com

GA Drilling (formerly Geothermal Anywhere) is a drilling technology company founded in 2008. The company develops hard-rock drilling tools for geothermal energy and oil and gas well construction. Its flagship product, NexTitan, is an autonomous downhole drilling system designed to improve drilling performance in hard rock formations.

GA Drilling has offices in Houston, Texas, Gloucester, UK, Bratislava, Slovakia, and Rio de Janeiro, Brazil.

== Technology ==
GA Drilling develops downhole drilling tools for hard rock formations, with applications in geothermal energy and oil and gas well construction.

NexTitan

NexTitan is an autonomous Downhole Drive System that operates close to the drill bit. It grips against the wellbore and produces its own downhole thrust rated at up to 30,000 pounds-force per unit. Onboard sensors monitor vibrations and drilling dynamics to adjust force as needed. By reducing vibrations and maintaining smooth and consistent weight on bit, the system is designed to extend drill bit life and improve rate of penetration in hard rock formations or long laterals. It is designed as a plug-and-play solution compatible with other downhole tools.

NexTitan Pulse

NexTitan Pulse is a drilling system that combines rock fracturing with mechanical drilling. It uses high-energy electrical discharges to pre-fracture and weaken rock ahead of the drill bit cutters.

== Notable projects and developments ==
NexTitan field tests

NexTitan has undergone field testing at the NORCE Ullrigg test facility in Stavanger, Norway, where the system was tested in an 8.5-inch wellbore drilled through hard rock. Testing validated the system's grip-and-thrust functionality in both casing and open-hole conditions, with a measured output of 32,000 lbf. In a subsequent phase, testing demonstrated continuous drilling using two coordinated Downhole Drive Units operating in a synchronized sequence. A prototype downhole turbine generator was also trialed during this period as an alternative to battery power.

Partnership with Petrobras

In 2024, GA Drilling entered a technical cooperation agreement with Petrobras and its R&D division Cenpes to develop an autonomous reeled drilling system for offshore well construction. The proposed system is designed for deployment from light well intervention vessels as a lower-cost alternative to drillships and semisubmersibles. GA Drilling and Petrobras have projected potential well construction cost reductions of up to 30%.

Alberta low-emission drilling project

GA Drilling is developing NexTitan for extended-reach, low-emission well construction, with funding support from Emissions Reduction Alberta (ERA). The project includes field testing across multiple locations and rock formations, with a final phase planned to demonstrate drilling on coiled tubing for oil, gas, and geothermal applications.

== Patents ==
GA Drilling holds granted patents in the United Kingdom and Europe covering its drilling and rock disintegration technologies with further applications pending in markets including the United States, Canada, and Brazil.

== History ==
Founding

GA Drilling was founded in 2008 in Bratislava, Slovakia, under the name Geothermal Anywhere. The company rebranded as GA Drilling in 2013.

PLASMABIT®

GA Drilling's earliest technology was PLASMABIT®, a plasma-based drilling system that used high-energy electrical discharges to fracture hard rock without mechanical contact between the tool and the rock surface. The system was initially developed for plug and abandonment of oil wells before being adapted for deep geothermal applications.

In 2019, GA Drilling signed a service agreement with MOL Group to test PLASMABIT® technology on onshore production wells. MOL Group, through its investment arm Lead Ventures, is also a shareholder in GA Drilling.

In 2020, GA Drilling received funding from Innovate UK for a collaborative research project with the University of Brighton, MTECH-UK Associates, and Advanced Analysis Limited to develop a combustion-based system for PLASMABIT® drilling.

In 2021, PLASMABIT® received the Solar Impulse Efficient Solution Label, a recognition awarded to solutions assessed by independent experts against feasibility, environmental, and profitability criteria.

GA Drilling's plasma technology is currently applied in NexTitan Pulse, which uses electrical discharges to pre-fracture rock ahead of mechanical drill bit cutters.

=== ANCHORBIT ® ===
GA Drilling developed ANCHORBIT®, a downhole tool designed to mitigate stick-slip during drilling in hard rock formations. The tool uses two sets of extendable pistons that alternately grip the borehole wall and absorb the reactive torque generated by the drill bit, preventing it from building up in the drillstring.

In 2022, Nabors Industries invested $8 million in GA Drilling as a strategic partner, supporting the development and commercialization of its downhole drilling tools.

In April 2023, GA Drilling and Nabors Industries publicly demonstrated ANCHORBIT® at Nabors' technology center in Houston, Texas where the tool successfully gripped the wellbore wall during drilling in a test well. GA Drilling later described these tests as validation of the anchoring system used in NexTitan, the successor to ANCHORBIT®.

=== Commercialization funding ===
In 2024, GA Drilling closed a $15 million financing round with investors including Nabors, former EQT CEO Thomas von Koch, and geothermal fund Underground Ventures.

In March 2026, the company raised $44.1 million to fund commercial deployment of NexTitan, its downhole anchoring and drive system. The round was led by TomEnterprise, the investment platform founded by Thomas von Koch, with participation from Underground Ventures and Nabors.
