= Seigler Springs, California =

Unincorporated community in California, United States

Seigler Springs
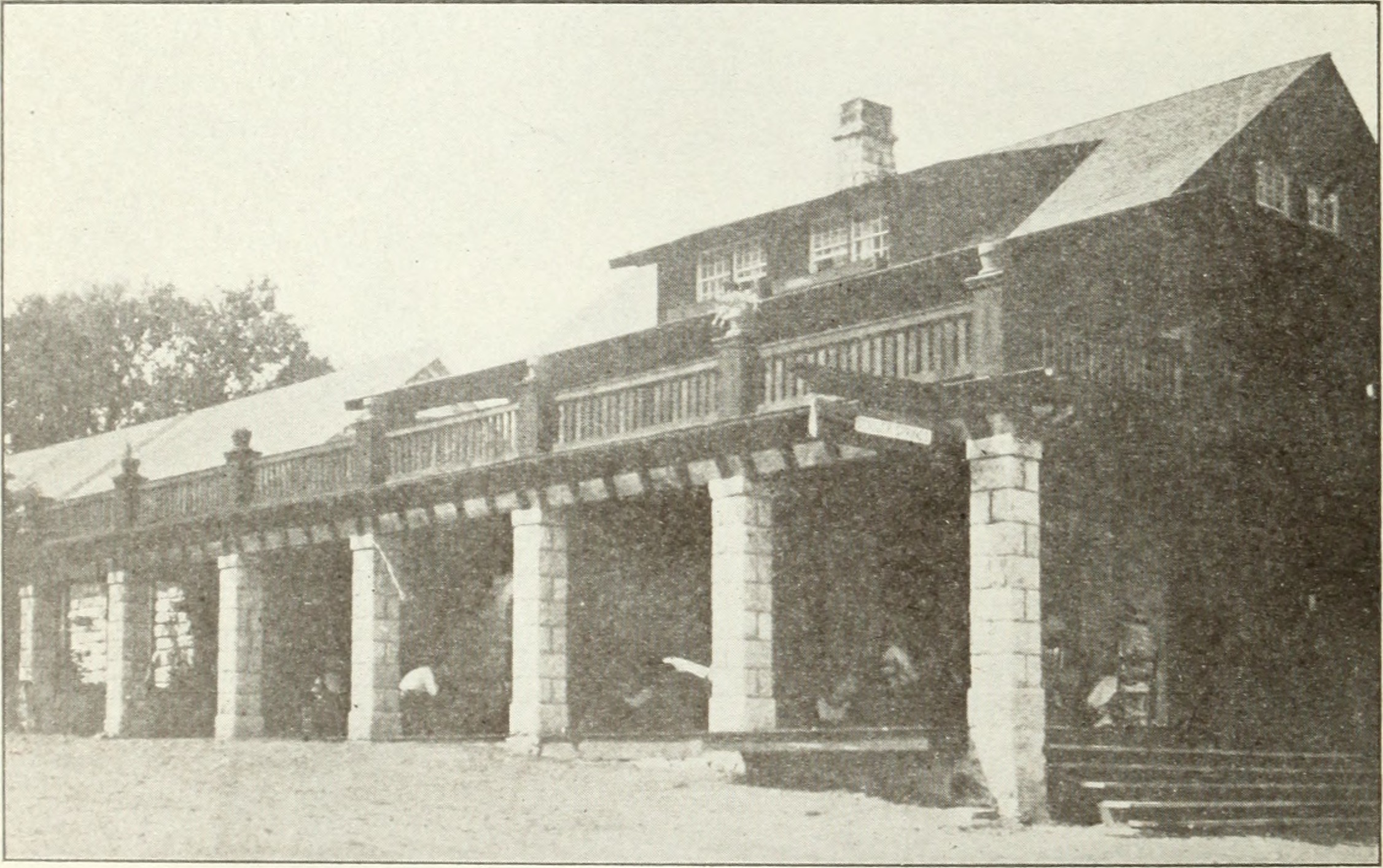
- Seigler Springs Resort hotel c. 1914

- Location in California Seigler Springs (the United States)
- Coordinates: 38°52′28″N 122°41′19″W
- Country: United States
- State: California
- County: Lake
- Elevation: 2,251 ft (686 m)

Seigler Springs is a set of springs in Lake County, California, United States around which a resort developed in the 19th century. In the 1930s the resort was expanded, and in 1947 an airport opened nearby. The resort declined in the 1960s. Part of it was separated out and became a residential subdivision, while part became a religious retreat. The 2015 Valley Fire caused great damage.

== Location ==
The unincorporated community of Seigler Springs is 1 mile (1.6 km) east of Seigler Mountain, 5 miles (8.0 km) south of Clear Lake and 20 miles (32 km) northeast of Healdsburg, at an elevation of 2,251 feet (686 m).

The thermal springs are about 2 miles (3.2 km) northwest of Howard Springs. They are on a gentle slope on the south side of Seigler Canyon Creek. The higher slopes are covered in lava, and crushed sediments appear below the springs. Below the springs the creek runs east through Seigler Canyon, which is about 3 miles (4.8 km) long, with its head about 0.6 miles (0.97 km) east of Seigler Springs and its mouth about 1.5 miles (2.4 km) west of the village of Lower Lake.

== Springs ==
Thirteen of the springs had been improved to some extent by 1909. Six of the improved springs had low volumes, with temperatures from 68 to 107 °F (20 to 42 °C), and were used for drinking. The Magnesia spring gave about 1/8 US gallon (0.47 L; 0.10 imp gal) of water per minute at 64 °F (18 °C). The Hot Geyser spring was developed by sinking a 3 inches (76 mm) pipe 90 feet (27 m) deep, and gave 2 US gallons (7.6 L; 1.7 imp gal) of water per minute. Before the earthquake of 18 April 1906 it usually spouted daily, but since then it had rarely spouted. Its water tasted and smelled slightly oily.

The Arensic Spring yielded about 5 US gallons (19 L; 4.2 imp gal) of water per minute at 96 °F (36 °C), used for both drinking and bathing. Two slightly warmer springs with about the same flow fed the Hot Iron baths. The two hottest springs were at the edge of Seigler Creek and fed nearby tub baths. One supplied about 4 US gallons (15 L; 3.3 imp gal) per minute as 119 °F (48 °C) and the other about 13 US gallons (49 L; 11 imp gal) per minute at 126 °F (52 °C).

The principal springs listed in 1914 were Hot Iron 107 °F (42 °C); Hot Sulphur 107 °F (42 °C); Small Sulphur 118.5 °F (48.1 °C); Big Sulphur 126 °F (52 °C); Lithia 67 °F (19 °C); Soda 64 °F (18 °C); Magnesia' 72 °F (22 °C); Arsenic 94 °F (34 °C) and one not named 97 °F (36 °C). Geyser' was blocked up. There was considerable excess gas escaping at the "Big Sulphur" spring, and beside it there was a large sinter deposit. Despite their names, the waters from the springs are almost identical except for Soda Spring, which has more magnesium.

== History ==
Thomas Seigler discovered the springs, and a resort grew up by the 1870s. In 1909 there was accommodation for about 150 guests in four or five cottages and a frame hotel with a large stone dining room. As well as the tub and plunge baths of mineral water, the creek had been dammed to make a swimming pool. Stone for the main dining room and part of the hotel had been quarried from a nearby body of light-colored volcanic tuff.

As of 1914 the resort was owned by the Seigler Springs Company, with chairman A.J. McGill and manager W.H. Roberts. The hotel was supplied with farm and dairy products from the ranch maintained as a part of the resort, comprising a total of 700 acres (280 ha). There were accommodations for 230 people. No water had been bottled for sale, but they were considering doing so. The Big Sulphur spring was the main one supplying the swimming pool, which was 30 by 200 feet (9.1 by 61.0 m) and 3 to 10 feet (0.91 to 3.05 m) deep. The pool had been made by damming the small ravine at the upper end of which several springs issue. Besides this, several of the other springs had stone bathhouses built over them, large enough for swimming.

The Seigler post office opened in 1904, closed in 1907, reopened in 1909, and closed for good in 1911. It was replaced by the Seigler Springs post office, which operated from 1915 to 1969.

In 1934 the Hoberg brothers, (Note: George Hoberg and his brothers Paul and Frank had taken took over operation of Hoberg's Resort in 1934.) Captain Olsen (Note: Captain Olsen was a former steam schooner captain on the Pacific Coast, nicknamed "Midnight Olsen" from a wager that he would return before midnight Christmas eve on a trip from Eureka to San Francisco and back. Despite heavy weather, he returned just in time to win the bet. He later became a pilot, guiding large freighters into and out of all the ports in California, before leaving the sea and buying into the resort.) and his son Ernie Olsen bought Seigler Springs Resort. They restored and modernized the resort, and it became so popular it could not provide room for all the would-be visitors. One cabin was named S.S. Acme in honor of Captain Gudmund Olsen. In 1943–1944 the Hoberg Brothers bought most of Seigler Valley. A runway was built in Seigler Valley in 1946. The Paul Hoberg Airport opened in 1947, half a mile from Seigler Springs, to serve Hoberg's Resort. At this time the resort had a coffee shop and dining rooms. There were mineral baths, a heated indoor mineral plunge and an outdoor freshwater pool. Activities included dancing, hiking, badminton, ping pong, tennis and shuffleboard. There were riding stables and golf courses nearby.

The Hoberg brothers sold their interest in Seigler Spring to the Olsens in 1948. As of 1953 Captain Olsen still owned and operated the resort with his son and family. They ran it as a family resort, and did not particularly encourage custom from the fliers from the nearby airport. Later Dorothy and Ernest Olsen took over and were more welcoming. In 1965 Paul Pieri and Bill Hecomovich, who had married the two daughters of Dorothy and Ernest, were managers and actively encouraged business from the pilots.

The Seigler Springs Subdivision was created from part of the resort property in 1966, with 52 lots.

The property was purchased for the Integral Yoga Institute and Swami Satchidananda in 1972, and it was called Yogaville West. It was a fairly strict community. Numerous single women were having discomforting experiences, and one day, in the kitchen, compared notes. They all had a similar feeling of someone sitting on their chest in the middle of the night. Satchidananda said it was a ghost, left over from the more "swinging" days, and that we should keep our rooms clean and burn lots of incense.

In 1974 the resort became the main Ruchira Sannyasin Sanctuary in the United States, where Adi Da taught until the early 1980s. The Seigler Springs resort as of 1989 was still being used as a private retreat. It contained historic buildings representative of early Twentieth Century resort-styled architecture. As of 2015 there were single family homes on 48 of the lots in the Seigler Springs Subdivision, mostly owned by Adidam devotees. The Valley Fire of 12 September 2015 destroyed 38 of the homes.

== Sources ==
- California Senate (1972), Senate Bills, California Legislature
- Durham, David L. (1998). California's Geographic Names: A Gazetteer of Historic and Modern Names of the State. Clovis, California: Word Dancer Press. p. 140. ISBN 1-884995-14-4.
- Feltman, Erving R (January 1, 1993), California's Lake County: Places and postal history, The Depot, ISBN 978-0943645285
- Hamilton, Fletcher (July 1915), "Report of State Mineralogist, 1913-1914", Appendix to the Journals of the Senate and Assembly of the forty-second session of the Legislature of the State of California, vol. VII
- Hoberg, Donna (2007), Resorts of Lake County, Arcadia Publishing, ISBN 978-0-7385-4798-5
- Hurwitz, Eliot (June 14, 2019), Bright Village at Seigler Springs (PDF)
- Jackson, Howard W. (March 1965), "Hot Springs", Flying Magazine, ISSN 0015-4806
- Lake County Planning Department (May 1989), Cobb Mountain Area Plan (PDF) (draft), archived from the original (PDF) on April 23, 2021
- Larson, John W. (March 1953), Oral History Interview with Caspar Hexberg, San Francisco, California (PDF), St. Paul, Minnesota: Forest History Foundation, Inc.
- Seigler Springs, USGS: U.S. Geological Survey Geographic Names Information System
- The Hermitages and Sanctuaries of Adidam: The Mountain Of Attention, Avataric Samrajya of Adidam
- The Road to Fame, Hoberg's Historical Association, 2017
- US Board on Geographic Names (1962), Decisions on Names in the United States, Department of the Interior
- Waring, Gerald Ashley (1915). Springs of California. U.S. Geological Survey Water Supply Paper. Vol. 338. U.S. Government Printing Office. doi:10.3133/wsp338.
