= Hoberg's Resort =

- resort
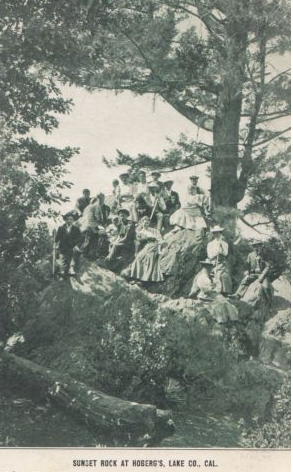
- 1908 postcard of visitors on Sunset Rock at Hoberg's

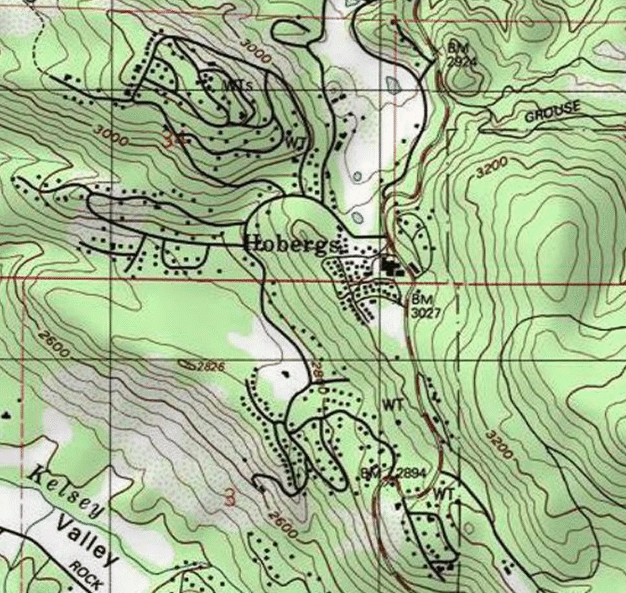
- Hobergs on State Hwy 175 north of Pine Grove and Cobb. Vertical dashed line to the east is the boundary of Boggs Mountain Demonstration State Forest.

- Location in California Hoberg's Resort (the United States)
- Coordinates: 38°50′37″N 122°43′28″W
- Country: United States
- State: California
- County: Lake
- Elevation: 3,015 ft (919 m)

Hoberg's Resort was a holiday resort in Lake County, California, United States. The unincorporated community of Hobergs grew up around it. The resort started out in the 1890s as a sideline where a farmer's wife offered meals to travelers, and it then became an economical place for campers and hunters to stay. It expanded, and after the founder's grandsons took over in 1934 it grew into a large and fashionable resort catering to weekend visitors who motored up from the San Francisco Bay Area. There was a swimming pool, dining hall, bar and outdoors dance floor, as well as amenities like hairdressers, a barber, resident physician, coffee shop and general store. Hollywood celebrities, politicians and businessmen stayed at the resort and were entertained by big-name musicians. By the 1960s, the resort had gone into decline, and it closed in 1971. The main building was destroyed by the 2015 Valley Fire.

== Location ==
Hoberg's Resort was located 2.25 miles (3.6 km) north-northwest of Whispering Pines. It is at an elevation of 3015 feet (919 m).

== Foundation ==
Gustav Hoberg was born in Westphalia, Germany, in 1845 and emigrated to the United States in 1860. His future wife Matilda Slotzenwall was born in Schleswig-Holstein, Germany, in 1848 and also moved to the United States. They married in Chicago in 1871, and moved to Wisconsin. In 1885 Gustav and Matilda Hoberg brought their four children to settle on a 160 acres (65 ha) property near Boggs Mountain. The property was owned by George Krammerer, a brother-in-law. Gustav paid $200 to buy another 80 acres (32 ha) beside the property.

Gustav built a house, and between 1893 and 1894 he and his oldest son Max built a road from the ranch to Cobb. Matilda began offering meals to travellers who stopped by the ranch to rest their horses. The first paying guests stayed at Hoberg's in 1894. Gustav died in 1895, but Matilda and Max continued to expand the resort to earn extra income. They built several rooms where guests could receive room and board for $7 a week. George Krammerer sent friends from San Francisco, and until 1914 it mainly catered to German immigrants from the San Francisco Bay Area. Most of the visitors were hunters or campers.

== Growth ==
Max and Matilda bought out George Krammerer in 1902. That year Max married Teresa Bleus. The resort gained a telephone connection in 1914. By this time there was accommodation for 100 guests in six buildings and tents on platforms. The resort had a dining room that could sit 80, a social hall, concrete swimming pool and bowling alley. The ranch also included 25 acres (10 ha) of grain and hay, gardens, 200 chicken, cattle and an apple orchard. A post office operated at Hoberg's from 1929 to 1970.

In 1934 George Hoberg and his brothers Paul and Frank took over operation of the resort from their parents. Also that year the Hoberg brothers, Captain Olsen (Note: Captain Olsen was a former steam schooner captain on the Pacific Coast, nicknamed "Midnight Olsen" from a wager that he would return before midnight Christmas eve on a trip from Eureka to San Francisco and back. Despite heavy weather, he returned just in time to win the bet. He later became a pilot, guiding large freighters into and out of all the ports in California, before leaving the sea and buying into the resort.) and his son Ernie Olsen bought Seigler Springs Resort. In the 1930s new resorts oriented towards the weekend automobile crowds were developed in the region, such as Whispering Pines, Forest Lake, and Pine Grove. Many of the older resorts based on curative mineral springs did not adapt and had to close. Hoberg's and Adams Springs were exceptions.

The Hoberg brothers restored and modernized Seigler Springs, and it became so popular it could not provide room for all the would-be visitors. Additions to the main Hoberg's resort in the 1930s included a large dining hall, a general store and a large tiled pool. A fire in 1936 burned 80 cottages. Hoberg's became what was probably the largest Lake County resort that did not contain mineral springs. Well known visitors included Luther Burbank, Clark Gable, Max Baer, politicians and businessmen.

== Peak years ==
Hoberg's became California's largest privately owned resort. Big name bands played there in the 1940s and 1950s, and it was frequented by celebrities. It was capable of serving dinner to 1,000 guests. 46 cottages were built on Spanish Row in 1945-1946. Paul Hoberg died in 1946. The Paul Hoberg Airport was dedicated in 1947, 5 miles (8.0 km) southeast of Hoberg's, just below Seigler Springs. Frank and George Hoberg both owned four small passenger planes, and both flew guests of Hoberg's resort to and from the resort.

The Pine Bowl dance floor was open air, so the music could be heard throughout the resort grounds. From 1945 Sal Carson and his orchestra played at Hoberg's for many years. In 1946 Tommy Dorsey played there. Other big-name entertainers included Xavier Cugat and Harry James. In 1947 the Freddy Martin Band played at the Pine Bowl dance floor with the singer Merv Griffin. Walt Tolleson and his band played at the resort in the late 1950s. At its peak in the 1950s the resort employed almost 100 people including waitresses, maids, coffee shop workers, bartenders and hairdressers. There was a physician in residence, a swimming instructor, a barber and a 12-piece orchestra. In 1956 a new auditorium was opened that could seat 1,000.

== Decline and sale ==
During the 1960s business slowly declined at Hoberg's, as it did at other Lake County resorts. Vacationers were starting to travel to more distant locations that offered more activities, and conventions started to use custom-built facilities in the large cities.George Hoberg died in 1970; the family ran the property as a boarding school for two years after his death.

In 1974, the Maharishi International University bought the property. As of 1989 the historic buildings of the old Hoberg resort were being used as a private retreat. In July 2010, the resort was purchased by a group of investors and renovations on the building occurred two years later. The resort building was destroyed by the Valley Fire in September 2015, with only the foundations and chimneys remaining intact.

== Sources ==
- California Senate (1972), Senate Bills, California Legislature
- Durham, David L. (1998). California's Geographic Names: A Gazetteer of Historic and Modern Names of the State. Clovis, California: Word Dancer Press. p. 77. ISBN 1-884995-14-4.
- Feltman, Erving R (1 January 1993), California's Lake County: Places and postal history, The Depot, ISBN 978-0943645285
- Freeman, Paul (16 December 2020), "Paul Hoberg Airport, Siegler Springs, CA", Abandoned & Little-Known Airfields: California: Santa Rosa Area
- Hoberg, Donna (2007). Resorts of Lake County. Arcadia Publishing. ISBN 9780738547985.
- "Hobergs", Geographic Names Information System, United States Geological Survey, United States Department of the Interior
- Lake County Planning Department (May 1989), Cobb Mountain Area Plan (PDF) (draft), Lake County Board of Supervisors, archived from the original (PDF) on 2021-04-23
- Larson, John W. (March 1953), Oral History Interview with Caspar Hexberg, San Francisco, California (PDF), St. Paul, Minnesota: Forest History Foundation, Inc.
- Larson, Elizabeth (29 June 2012), "Hobergs Resort prepares for renovations; seeks crew to carry out work", Lake County News
- Rossman, Randi; Payne, Paul (September 13, 2015). "Valley Fire: Devastation during the night as fire destroys homes". Santa Rosa Press Democrat.
- The Beginning..., Hoberg's Historical Association
- The Road to Fame, Hoberg's Historical Association
