= Harbin Mountain =

Mountain in Lake County, California, US

- Location within California

Highest point
- Elevation: 2,585 ft (788 m)
- Prominence: 25 ft (7.6 m)
- Parent peak: Boggs Mountain
- Isolation: 0.37 mi (0.60 km)
- Coordinates: 38.7919°N 122.646129°W

Geography
- Country: United States
- State: California
- County: Lake County
- Parent range: Mayacamas Mountains
- Topo map: Whispering Pines O38122g6 1:24,000

Harbin Mountain is a mountain in Lake County, California. It may be seen as a high point on a spur of Boggs Mountain or as a connected mountain to the southeast of Boggs Mountain.

== Location ==
Harbin Mountain is in Lake County, California. It is in the Mayacamas Mountains in the northern California Coast Ranges. The mountain is a high point above Harbin Hot Springs on a ridge that comes down from Boggs Mountain. It is accessible from Harbin Hot Springs, from Boggs Mountain, or from Big Canyon Creek. The hike from Big Canyon gives a fine view to the southeast over Long Valley and Collayomi Valley to Mount Saint Helena. The mountain is best climbed in spring or fall, when there is no snow but it is not too hot.

The Köppen climate classification is Csb : Warm-summer Mediterranean climate. In 1890 the crest was densely timbered, while the slopes lower down had scattered oaks and were partly covered with chamise. The trees were badly damaged in 2015 by the Valley Fire.

== Name ==
Around 1856 a settler named James M. Harbin took control of the land occupied by the Harbin Hot Springs, and gave his name to the springs and the mountain.

== Physical ==
Harbin Mountain has an elevation of 2,585 feet (788 m). (Note: The U.S. Board on Geographic Names gives an elevation of 2,572 feet (784 m).) It has a clean prominence of 25 feet (7.6 m) and isolation of 0.37 miles (0.60 km). The nearest higher neighbor is Boggs Mountain. (Note: Boggs mountain is named after Henry C. Boggs, an early settler in Lake County who was active in ranching, property, timber and banking in the late 19th century. The name "Harbin Mountain" once applied to the whole of Boggs Mountain.)

The mountain takes the form of a simple ridge crest from which long spurs run southeast to Putah Creek. As of 1890 the higher crest of the mountain was volcanic. Lower down the spurs were unaltered or slightly altered sandstone and shales. The serpentine belt in the vicinity of Boggs Mountain and Harbin Mountain probably takes the form of a folded sheet or bed rather than a more massive tabular dipping mass.

== Sources ==
- Chapman, Rodger H. (1975), Geophysical Study of the Clear Lake Region, California, California Division of Mines and Geology
- Draft Environmental Impact Report for Geothermal Exploration Permit, Boggs Mountain State Forest, Lake County, Ca, The Commission, 1976
- Goodyear, W.A. (1890), "Lake County", Report of the State Mineralogist, San Francisco: California Department of Conservation, Division of Mines and Geology
- "Harbin Mountain, California", Peakbagger
- "Harbin Mountain, Lake County, California, United States", Mindat
- "Harbin Mountain", Summitpost
- "Harbin Mountain", Geographic Names Information System, United States Geological Survey, United States Department of the Interior, 19 January 1991
- History of the Springs, Harbin Hot Springs
