= Hoberg (surname) =

Hoberg is a surname. Notable people with the surname include:

- Christine Hoberg, American singer, songwriter and electronic music producer
- Dwaine Hoberg (1925–1984), American football coach and politician
- George Hoberg (1904–1970), Californian businessman
- Margaret Hoberg Turrell (1890–1948), American composer
- Pat Hoberg (born 1986), American baseball umpire
- Rick Hoberg (born 1952), American comics artist and animator

== See also ==
- Hochberg (noble family), once known as Hoberg
