= Seigler Mountain =

Mountain in California, United States

- Location within California

Highest point
- Elevation: 3,692 feet (1,125 m)
- Prominence: 800 feet (240 m)
- Isolation: 3.1 kilometres (1.9 mi) to Mount Hannah
- Coordinates: 38.873808°N 122.70976°W

Geography
- Country: United States
- State: California
- County: Lake County

Geology
- Mountain type: Lava dome
- Volcanic field: Clear Lake volcanic field

Seigler Mountain is a mountain in the Mayacamas Mountains of the Northern California Coast Ranges. It is in Lake County, California.

== Name ==
The mountain is named after Thomas Seigler, who discovered the Seigler Springs to the east of the mountain, where a resort grew up by the 1870s.

== Physical ==
The mountain is in Lake County, California. It has an elevation of 3,692 feet (1,125 m). Clean prominence is 800 feet (240 m). Isolation is 3.1 kilometres (1.9 mi). The nearest higher neighbor is Mount Hannah to the WNW.

== Location ==
Seigler Mountain is one of the mountains in the Cobb Mountain Area, which have a volcanic origin. Others are Cobb Mountain, the most dominant, Mount Hannah and Boggs Mountain. There are isolated small valleys and basins between the mountain peaks. Seigler Mountain is separated from Mount Hannah by Salminas Basin, a large mountain meadow with an unusual complex of wetlands that feeds Cole Creek. Flows of porphyritic lavas from Mount Hannah and Seigler Mountain cover about 7 square miles (18 km^{2}). The mountain was volcanically active 600,000 years ago, and flows from the mountain overlaid white bedded tuff to the north of Howard Springs.

== Ecology ==
A delimitation survey published in 2020 found that Seigler Mountain was infested by Mediterranean oak borers (Xyleborus monographus), a type of non-native invasive beetle that mainly attacks oak species. In California it most often attacks valley oak, and less often attacks blue oak.

== Sources ==
- Durham, David L. (1998). California's Geographic Names: A Gazetteer of Historic and Modern Names of the State. Clovis, California: Word Dancer Press. p. 140. ISBN 1-884995-14-4.
- Goff, Fraser; Guthrie, George (June 1999), Field Trip Guide to Serpentinite, Silica-Carbonate Alteration, and Related Hydrothermal Activity in the Clear Lake Rep-on, California, Los Alamos National Laboratory
- Lake County Planning Department (May 1989), Cobb Mountain Area Plan (PDF) (Preliminary Draft), archived from the original (PDF) on 2021-04-23
- Lyle, Steve (4 August 2020), Mediterranean Oak Borer Detected in Lake, Napa, and Sonoma Counties, Sacramento: California Department of Food and Agriculture Office of Public Affairs
- Sanger, David, "Seigler Mountain, California", Peakbagger
