= Henry C. Boggs =

Henry Carroll Boggs
- Born: 1 June 1830; Jackson County, Missouri
- Died: 27 September 1898 (aged 68); Lakeport, California
- Occupations: Farmer, businessman, banker
- Known for: Boggs Mountain

Henry Carroll Boggs (1 June 1820 – 27 September 1898) was a farmer, businessman and banker who was prominent in Lake County, California in the late 19th century. His name was given to Boggs Mountain and Boggs Lake.

== Early years (1820–1850) ==
Henry C. Boggs was born in Jackson County, Missouri on 1 June 1820, the second son of Lilburn Boggs. His mother died in the year of his birth. His father remarried in 1823, and had seven more children between 1824 and 1841. His father would be governor of Missouri from 1836 to 1840. (Note: Lilburn Boggs was born in Lexington, Kentucky, on 14 December 1792. He sold goods in different towns along the Missouri River before settling in Independence, Missouri. Around 1832–1833 he was engaged in the Santa Fe trade. He was elected Governor of Missouri, holding office from 1836 to 1840. During his term of office he called out the State Militia to expel the Mormons from Missouri. In revenge, the Mormons attempted to kill him in 1842. He emigrated to California in 1846 with his family, where he was appointed alcade of the Northern District of California in the aftermath of the Mexican–American War. He died at his farm in Napa Valley, California, on 4 March 1860.) Henry Boggs was educated in Missouri, and became a farmer there. On 13 October 1840 he married Martha J. Young. Their children were Lew Ann (1841–1864), James William (1843–1920) and Lilburn Henry (1850–1923). His father emigrated to California in 1846.

== Napa County (1850–1870) ==
Henry C. Boggs left for to California in May 1850, reached Sacramento, California on 20 August 1850 and went on to Napa County. He began farming about 6 miles (9.7 km) northwest of Napa. His son Lilburn H. Boggs, who was three months old when the family travelled to California in a covered wagon, was educated at McClure's Academy (Note: McClure's Academy was a military college where boys were boarded and trained as infantry soldiers.) in Oakland and Heald's Business College in San Francisco. In 1864 Henry Boggs visited Lake County, California and bought land in Big Valley. From 1864 to 1869 he divided his time between Napa and Lake counties, since he had interests in both.

The first sawmill in Lake County had been built by "Dobe" Boyd on Mount Hannah, and began operation in 1858. It was steam-driven, and was a grist mill as well as sawmill. It burned to the ground in 1860, but was quickly rebuilt beside what later was called Boggs Lake. After various changes of ownership, Boggs bought the mill in the fall of 1866. In 1869 he returned to Missouri, where he spent the summer, and also visited New York. He returned to California in the fall of 1869.

== Lake County (1870–1898) ==
In the spring of 1870 Boggs moved to Lakeport in Lake County. The Farmers Savings Bank-Lakeport was incorporated on 14 December 1874. In 1875 or 1876, his son Lilburn joined the bank as an assistant cashier. In 1878, Henry C. Boggs became president of the bank. Lilburn Boggs became Sheriff of Lake County, and held this office until he retired in 1895.

By the late 1870s, Boggs was a leading financier in Lake County. He was elected a delegate to the California Constitutional Convention in 1878. That year he bought timberland tracts within what is now Boggs Mountain Demonstration State Forest. He and his partners began logging the Boggs Mountain in the early 1880s, the first known use by Europeans. From 1880 to 1885, one of his sons ran two sawmills on the northeast of the mountain.

In 1893, Boggs was still president of the Farmer's Savings Bank and held 501 of the 1,000 shares, valued at $73.40 per share. The bank had assets of $236,748. In 1894, Boggs deeded 2,761 acres (1,117 ha) of mountain timberland to his son Lilburn. Boggs died in Lakeport at the age of 78 on 27 September 1898, about two months after his wife. He had extensive interests in livestock, land and timber in Lake County. He was buried in Tulocay Cemetery, Napa, California. He was survived by his two sons. James Boggs succeeded him as president of the Farmers Saving Bank. Boggs Mountain was named after him.

== Sources ==
- "Boggs, Henry C.", History of Napa and Lake Counties, California, San Francisco, California: Slocum, Bowen & Co., 1881
- Boggs, William M. (3 April 1909), A Short Biographical Sketch Of Lilburn W. Boggs, By His Son, Napa, California, archived from the original on 2006-07-07
- Boggs-Burt, Carolyn, "Henry Carroll Boggs", Find a Grave
- Commissioners, California. Board of Bank (1893), Report of the Board of Bank Commissioners of the State of California, Office of the Board of Bank Commissioners
- Dillon, Brian D. (1995), History and Prehistory of Boggs Mountain Demonstration State Forest, Lake County, California, State of California, California Department of Forestry and Fire Protection, Archaeology Office
- Draft Environmental Impact Report for Geothermal Exploration Permit, Boggs Mountain State Forest, Lake County, Ca, The Commission, 1976
- Fragnoli, Delaine; Stuart, Robin (1995), Mountain Biking Northern California's Best 100 Trails, Fine Edge Productions, ISBN 978-0-938665-31-1
- Gerike, Christian; Stewart, Suzanne Bestor (1988), Boggs Mountain Demonstration State Forest: Prehistoric Archaeological Overview, The Department, ISBN 978-1-55567-628-5
- Haight, H.H. (1872), "Report of military proceedings", Appendix to the Journals of the Senate and Assembly, California. Legislature
- "Henry Boggs Dead", Napa Journal, Napa, California: 3, 28 September 1898 – via Newspapers.com
