= Anderson Springs, California =

Unincorporated community in California, United States

Anderson Springs
- Unincorporated community
- Location in California Anderson Springs (the United States)
- Coordinates: 38°46′30″N 122°41′35″W
- Country: United States
- State: California
- County: Lake
- Elevation: 1,410 ft (430 m)

Anderson Springs is an unincorporated community in Lake County, California, United States. It is located at an elevation of 1411 feet (430 m).

== Location ==
The community is located approximately four miles north of Middletown, in southwestern Lake County, 24 miles (39 km) from Calistoga. It lies at 1,525 feet (465 m) above sea level.

According to the Anderson Valley Homeowners Association, the permanent population in 2004 was 403, with a seasonal population high of 986.

== History ==
Anderson Springs were discovered in 1873, when the Anderson family took possession. They became a popular resort. As of 1914 they were owned by Miss Barbara Anderson, who had a hotel that could accommodate more than 100 people. Eight of the springs were in active use. Cold Sulphur was below the hotel and had a temperature of 63 °F (17 °C). The others were mostly above the hotel: Iron, 103 °F (39 °C); Sour, 65 °F (18 °C); Bellmer, 65 °F (18 °C); Magnesia (or Father Joseph), 70 °F (21 °C); Hot Sulphur and Iron, 145 °F (63 °C); Iron and Magnesia, 103 °F (39 °C); Steam Bath, 138 °F (59 °C). A considerable amount of hydrogen sulfide gas escapes from the last two.

== 2015 Valley Fire ==
In September 2015, Anderson Springs was devastated in the Valley Fire, which caused two fatalities and destroyed 90% of the town's homes, leaving most community members homeless. More than 1,000 people were living in shelters.

A video that was widely disseminated on the internet shows a man and his family escaping the area in his car, with fires burning on either side of the road. The man had been driving a diesel van at the head of his family's 3-car convoy to escape from a house built in the 1930s by his great-grandfather. His mother, Sally Wolf, part of the escape party, said that they had never received the evacuation order, and had not seen flames from their house until "we rounded one last corner and then it was completely engulfed in flames and there was nothing we could do".

The community has started to organize cleanup and rebuild soon after the fire and numerous fundraisers have been created on platforms like GoFundMe to help finance the works.

== Sources ==
- Hamilton, Fletcher (July 1915), "Report of State Mineralogist, 1913-1914", Appendix to the Journals of the Senate and Assembly of the forty-second session of the Legislature of the State of California, vol. VII
- Waring, Gerald Ashley (1915). Springs of California. U.S. Geological Survey Water Supply Paper. Vol. 338. U.S. Government Printing Office. doi:10.3133/wsp338.
