= Boggs Mountain =

Mountain in the state of California

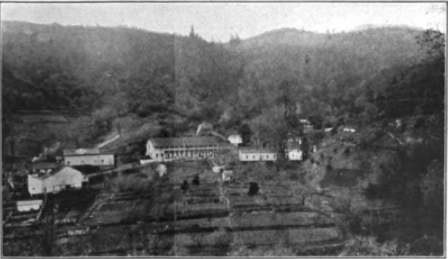
- Harbin Hot Springs c. 1910

Highest point
- Elevation: 1,140 m (3,740 ft)
- Parent peak: Cobb Mountain
- Coordinates: 38.815507°N 122.682183°W

Geography
- Location within California
- Country: United States
- State: California
- County: Lake County
- Parent range: Mayacamas Mountains, California Coast Ranges

Geology
- Mountain type: Lava dome
- Volcanic field: Clear Lake volcanic field

Boggs Mountain is a mountain the Mayacamas Mountains in Lake County, California. Part of the mountain holds the Boggs Mountain Demonstration State Forest. About 80% of the trees were burned in the September 2015 Valley Fire.

== Name ==
In the early days of settlement of Lake County, the mountain was called Harbin Mountain after a settler named James M. Harbin who around 1856 took control of the land occupied by the Harbin Hot Springs, and gave his name to the springs and the mountain. An 1890 description by the State Mineralogist used this name to refer to the mountain. Later the mountain took the name Boggs Mountain. This name honors Henry C. Boggs (1820–1898), an early settler and entrepreneur in Lake County. The name Harbin Mountain survives, referring to a high point above Harbin Hot Springs on a ridge that comes down to the south from Boggs Mountain. (Note: The 1890 description says Harbin's Spring are in a little valley immediately south of Mount Esther, a small peak on one of the spurs of the mountain. Possibly Mount Esther is what is called Harbin Mountain today)

== Location ==
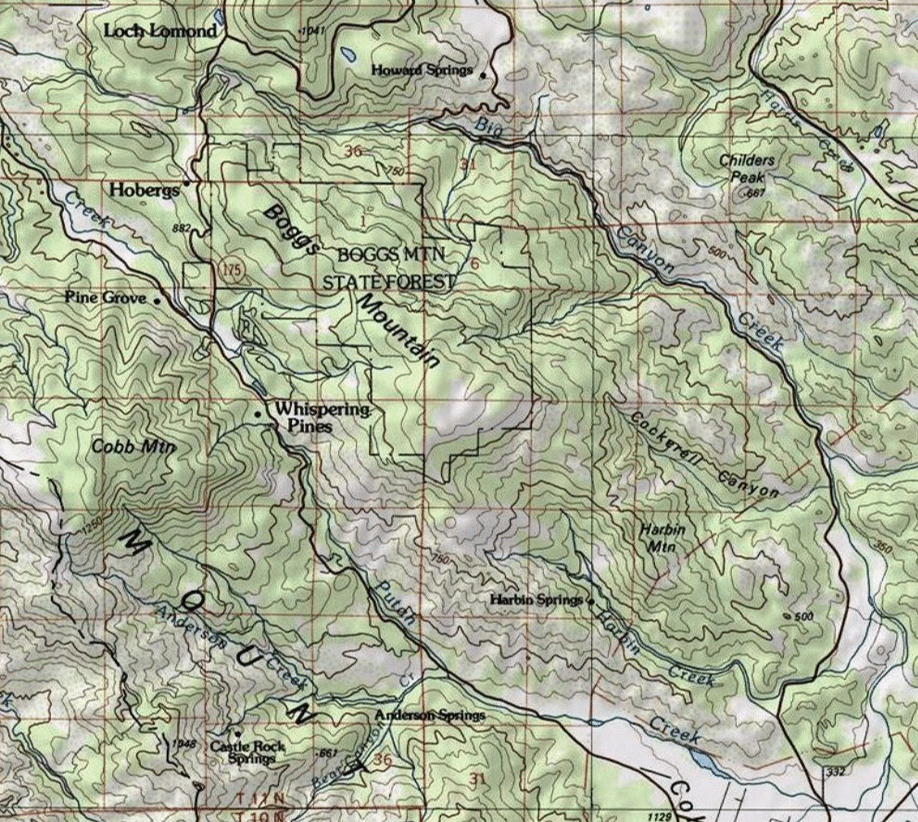
Topo map showing Boggs Mountain between Kelsey Creek and Putah Creek to the southwest, and Big Canton Creek to the northeast

Boggs Mountain is located in Lake County, California. It is 3,740 feet (1,140 m) high, in the heart of the Mayacamas Mountains, facing the 4,728 feet (1,441 m) Cobb Mountain across Cobb Valley. The mountains are in the California Coast Ranges. Boggs Mountain is one of the mountains in the Cobb Mountain Area, many of which have volcanic origin. Others are Cobb Mountain, the most dominant, Mount Hannah and Seigler Mountain. There are isolated small valleys and basins between the mountain peaks.

A deep gap more than 1,500 feet (460 m) deep separates Boggs Mountain from the taller Cobb Mountain to the west. A ridge runs southeast from Mount Hannah to Boggs Mountain, separating Seigler Creek from Kelsey Creek. Boggs Mountain forms a topographical divide separating Big Canyon Creek to the east from Kelsey Creek to the west.

== Description ==
Boggs Mountain is an elongated rolling highland. The mountain takes the form of a simple ridge crest from which long spurs run southeast to Putah Creek. It is a prominent feature at the southeast end of the Clear Lake Volcanic Field. Around 3,000 feet (910 m) above sea level the topography levels out. The upper part of the mountain is similar to a plateau cut by several drainage channels.

The mountain is capped with andesitic lavas covering about 5 square miles (13 km^{2}). The well-drained soils have been formed from volcanic materials that overlay the Franciscan assemblage, which include sandstone, shale, chert, greenstone and igneous and metamorphics, including serpentinite.

== Forestry ==
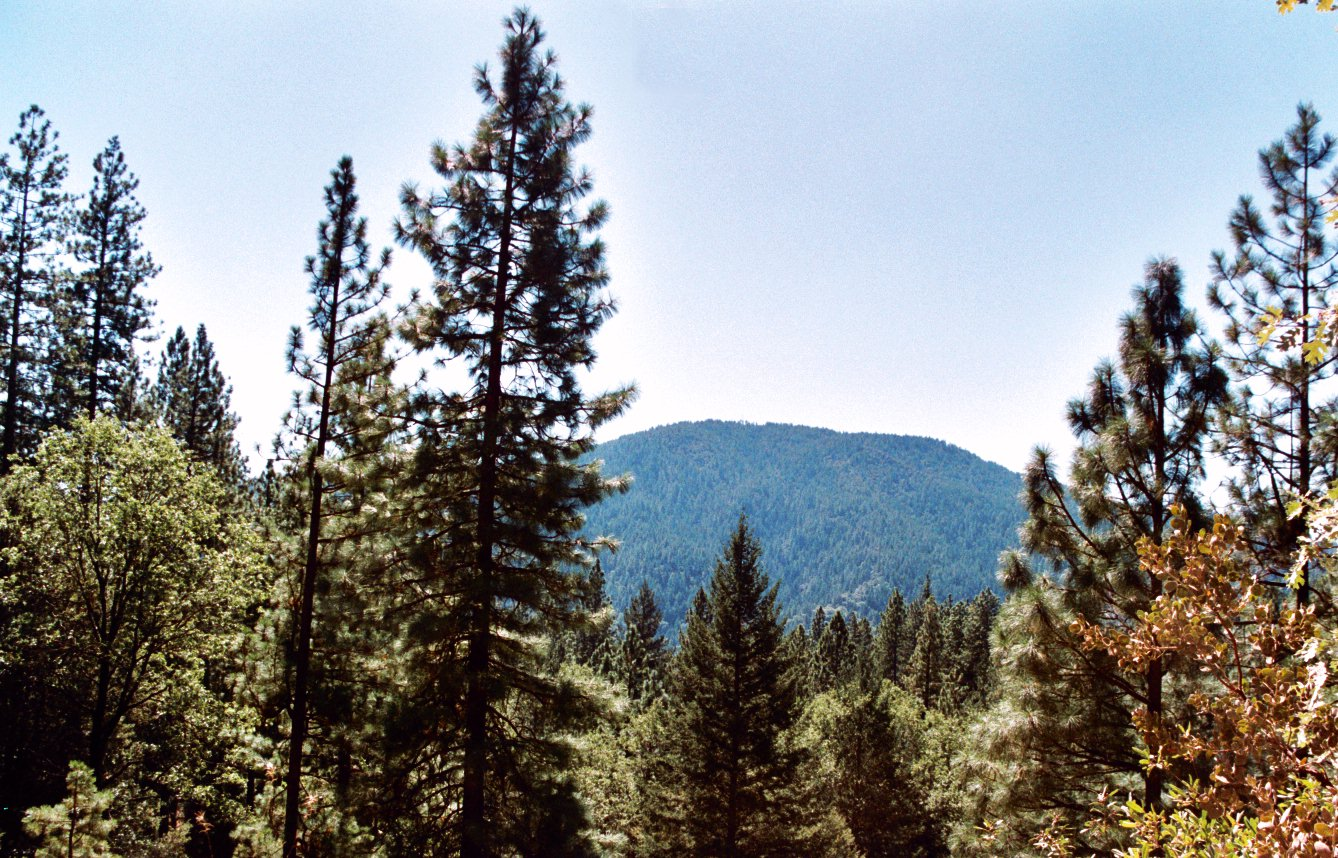
Bogg Mountain State Forest, Cobb Mountain in background

Henry C. Boggs was an early settler in Lake County who was active in ranching, property, timber and banking in the late 19th century. In 1878 he bought timberland tracts within what is now Boggs Mountain Demonstration State Forest. He and his partners began logging the Boggs Mountain in the early 1880s, the first known use by Europeans. From 1880 to 1885 one of his sons ran two sawmills on the northeast of the mountain. Lumber was need for underground supports in the borax mine at Borax Lake, north of Clearlake, and in the Sulphur Bank Mine. Wood was also needed for the mines' reducing furnaces. Most of this came from the volcanic uplands of Kelsey Creek and neighboring watersheds.

By the end of the 19th century most of the prime timber in the Boggs Mountain area had been cleared, and the land was mainly being used for pasturage rather than timber. As of 1890 the higher crest of the mountain was volcanic and still densely timbered. Lower down the spurs were unaltered or slightly altered sandstone and shales, with scattered oaks, partly covered with chamise.

Jim McCauley became the owner of the mountain in the 1920s. In the 1920s and 1930s he limited logging in the forest to scattered, over-mature trees, with no clear cutting. When McCauley died in 1941 his property was divided between seven nieces and nephews. In the mid-1940s a major fire swept through the northwestern part of the Boggs Mountain forest. In 1944 MCauley's Calso Company sold the timber rights of almost 3,000 acres (1,200 ha) of the Boggs Mountain forest to Setzer Forest Products Inc. Setzer Forest Products did not start logging until 1947. After World War II (1939–1945) there was a boom in construction, and all the usable old-growth and secondary forest was clear cut.

The 3,453 acres (1,397 ha) Boggs Mountain Demonstration State Forest covers the relatively flat top of Boggs Mountain. The California Department of Forestry and Fire Protection (CAL FIRE) purchased the land in 1949. The state bought the land for just $38,700 because it held no timber of commercial value. The 200 acres (81 ha) Boggs Mountain Inner Coast Range Reserve has steeper slopes that have virtually undisturbed vegetation. It is under a conservation easement with the Napa County Land Trust. The Valley Fire of 6 October 2015 burned many of the trees on the mountain.

== Sources ==
- Boggs Demonstration Forest, CAL FIRE, archived from the original on July 31, 2019
- "Boggs Mountain", summitpost.org
- Cobb, F.W.; Parmeter, J.R.; Wood, D.L.; Stark, R.W. (1974), "Root pathogens as agents predisposing ponderosa pine and white fir to bark beetles", in E. G. Kuhlman (ed.), Fomes Annosus: Proceedings ..., Southeastern Forest Experiment Station, Forest Service, USDA
- Dillon, Brian D. (1995), History and Prehistory of Boggs Mountain Demonstration State Forest, Lake County, California, State of California, California Department of Forestry and Fire Protection, Archaeology Office
- Draft Environmental Impact Report for Geothermal Exploration Permit, Boggs Mountain State Forest, Lake County, Ca, The Commission, 1976
- Fragnoli, Delaine; Stuart, Robin (1995), Mountain Biking Northern California's Best 100 Trails, Fine Edge Productions, ISBN 978-0-938665-31-1
- Gerike, Christian; Stewart, Suzanne Bestor (1988), Boggs Mountain Demonstration State Forest: Prehistoric Archaeological Overview, The Department, ISBN 978-1-55567-628-5
- Goodyear, W.A. (1890), "Lake County", Report of the State Mineralogist, San Francisco: California Department of Conservation, Division of Mines and Geology
- "Harbin Mountain", Summitpost
- History of the Springs, Harbin Hot Springs
- Lake County Planning Department (May 1989), Cobb Mountain Area Plan (PDF) (Preliminary Draft)
- Lundquist, Erica (February 2010), Kelsey Creek Watershed Assessment (PDF), Big Valley Watershed Council, archived from the original (PDF) on 2021-04-22
