= Sal Carson =

American trumpet player (1920–2007)

- Carson from his 78 rpm Honey Dear
- Born: Salvator Carcione; 2 November 1920; San Francisco, California, USA
- Died: 19 October 2007 (aged 86); San Francisco, California, USA
- Occupations: Trumpeter, band leader

Salvator Carcione (2 November 1920 – 19 October 2007) was a San Francisco-based American trumpeter and big band leader.

== Life ==
Salvator Carcione was born on 2 November 1920, son of Joseph and Sivia Carcione. He was born in San Francisco and spent his childhood in Oakland, California, where he attended University High School. He began playing the banjo at the age of 15, but soon switched to the trumpet. He formed his first band when he was aged 15. He married and had three daughters. The Sal Carson Orchestra ranged in size from a trio to a 40-piece band. Carson played with Vic Damone, Duke Ellington, Frankie Laine, Helen O'Connell, Phyllis Diller and Barbara Eden. He played for presidents John F. Kennedy and Gerald Ford, and often played at fundraisers for local politicians.

For many years Carson performed with his Big Band at all the home games for the San Francisco 49ers in Candlestick Park. He composed the song 49ers So Proud and Bold. He often stood on the 50-yard line and gave a solo rendition of The Star-Spangled Banner on his trumpet. For over 30 years his band played at the Columbus Day Parade in North Beach, San Francisco. His orchestra was the resident band at Hoberg's Resort in Lake County from the 1940s to 1960s. In 1946 Tommy Dorsey played there. A picture survives of Sal Carson playing catcher for the Hoberg team at a softball game, while Tommy Dorsey was at bat. In the 1950s he played at the St. Francis Hotel in the Battle of the Bands.

Carson was involved in the Special Olympics and the Godfather Club for the Saint Vincent School for Boys. He died on 19 October 2007 in San Francisco of a heart attack, at the age of 86.

== Discography ==
- Sal Carson Big Band Honey Dear (LP) Astro Records
- Sal Carson Big Band So Beats My Heart For You (7", Styrene) Astro Records 1975
- Sal Carson Big Band 49ers So Proud And Bold / Hello Dolly (7") Astro Records

== Sources ==
- Hamlin, Jesse (30 October 2007), "Sal Carson - Bay Area trumpeter and bandleader", Sfgate
- Hoberg, Donna (2007), Resorts of Lake County, Arcadia Publishing, ISBN 978-0-7385-4798-5, OCLC 1065557907
- "Sal Carson", San Francisco Chronicle, 26 October 2007
- "Salvator "Sal" Carson-Carcione", Findagrave
