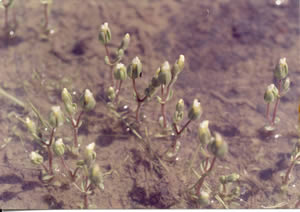

Conservation status
- Imperiled (NatureServe)

Scientific classification
- Kingdom: Plantae
- Clade: Tracheophytes
- Clade: Angiosperms
- Clade: Eudicots
- Clade: Asterids
- Order: Lamiales
- Family: Plantaginaceae
- Genus: Gratiola
- Species: G. heterosepala

Binomial name
- Gratiola heterosepala H.Mason & Bacig.

= Gratiola heterosepala =

Species of flowering plant

Gratiola heterosepala is a species of flowering plant known by the common name Boggs Lake hedgehyssop.

It is native to northern California, where it grows in mud and very shallow water, such as the edges of vernal pools. One occurrence of the plant has been noted in Oregon.

== Description ==
Gratiola heterosepala is a small annual herb with reddish-green stems, a few centimeters tall. The thin stems and small leaves are dotted with hairlike glands.

The top of the stem is occupied by an inflorescence that produces centimeter long tubular flowers. Flowers are yellow with white tips and bloom April to September. The plant is threatened by grazing, development, agriculture, recreational activities, and vernal pool loss.

== Boggs Lake Ecological Reserve ==
The plant is found and protected at the Boggs Lake Ecological Reserve in Lake County, California.
