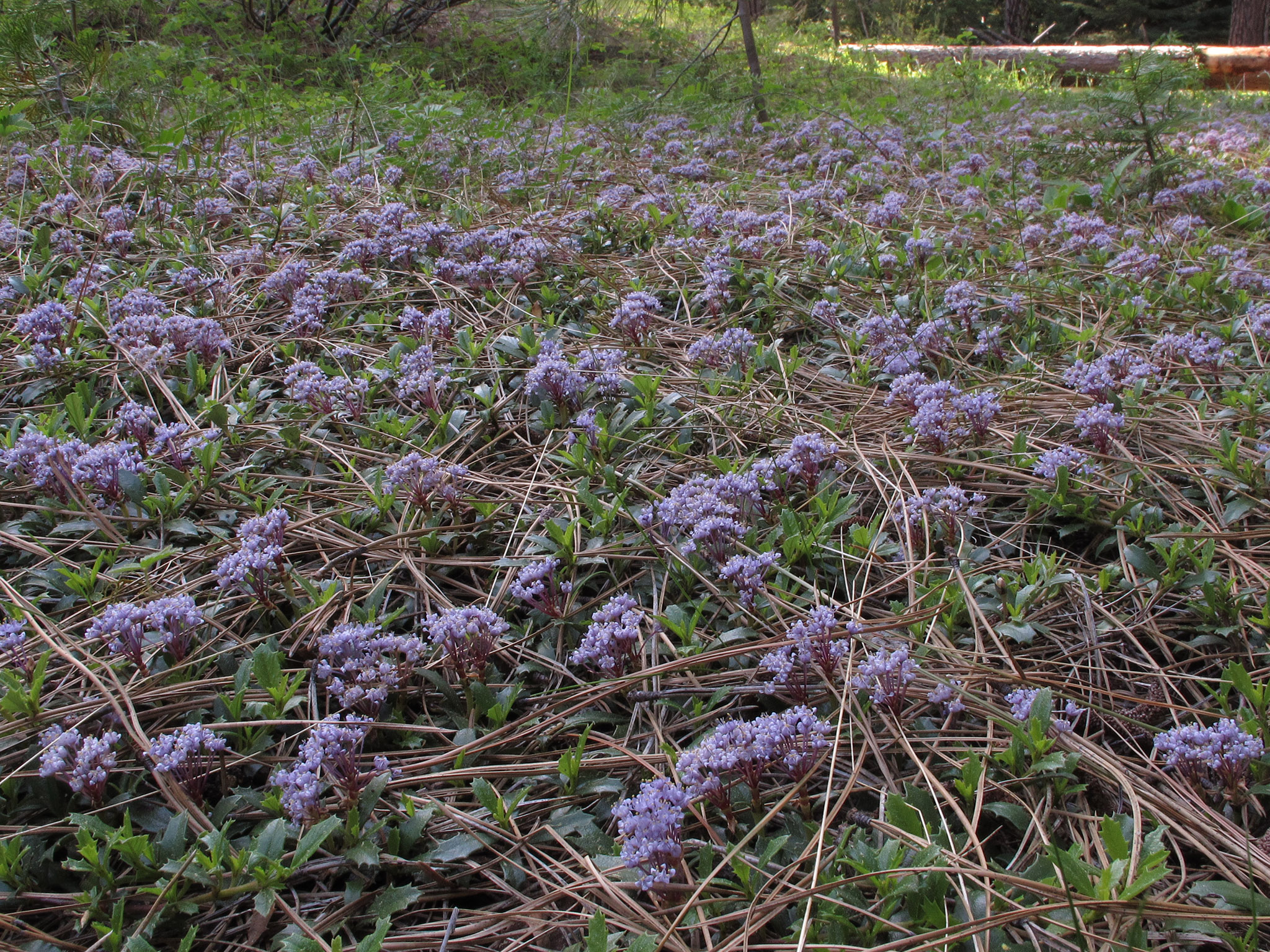

Scientific classification
- Kingdom: Plantae
- Clade: Tracheophytes
- Clade: Angiosperms
- Clade: Eudicots
- Clade: Rosids
- Order: Rosales
- Family: Rhamnaceae
- Genus: Ceanothus
- Species: C. prostratus

Binomial name
- Ceanothus prostratus Benth.

= Ceanothus prostratus =

Species of flowering plant

Ceanothus prostratus is a species of shrub in the family Rhamnaceae. Common names include prostrate ceanothus, pinemat, and mahala mat. It is native to the Pacific Northwest of the United States where it grows in coniferous forests and open plateaus.

== Description ==
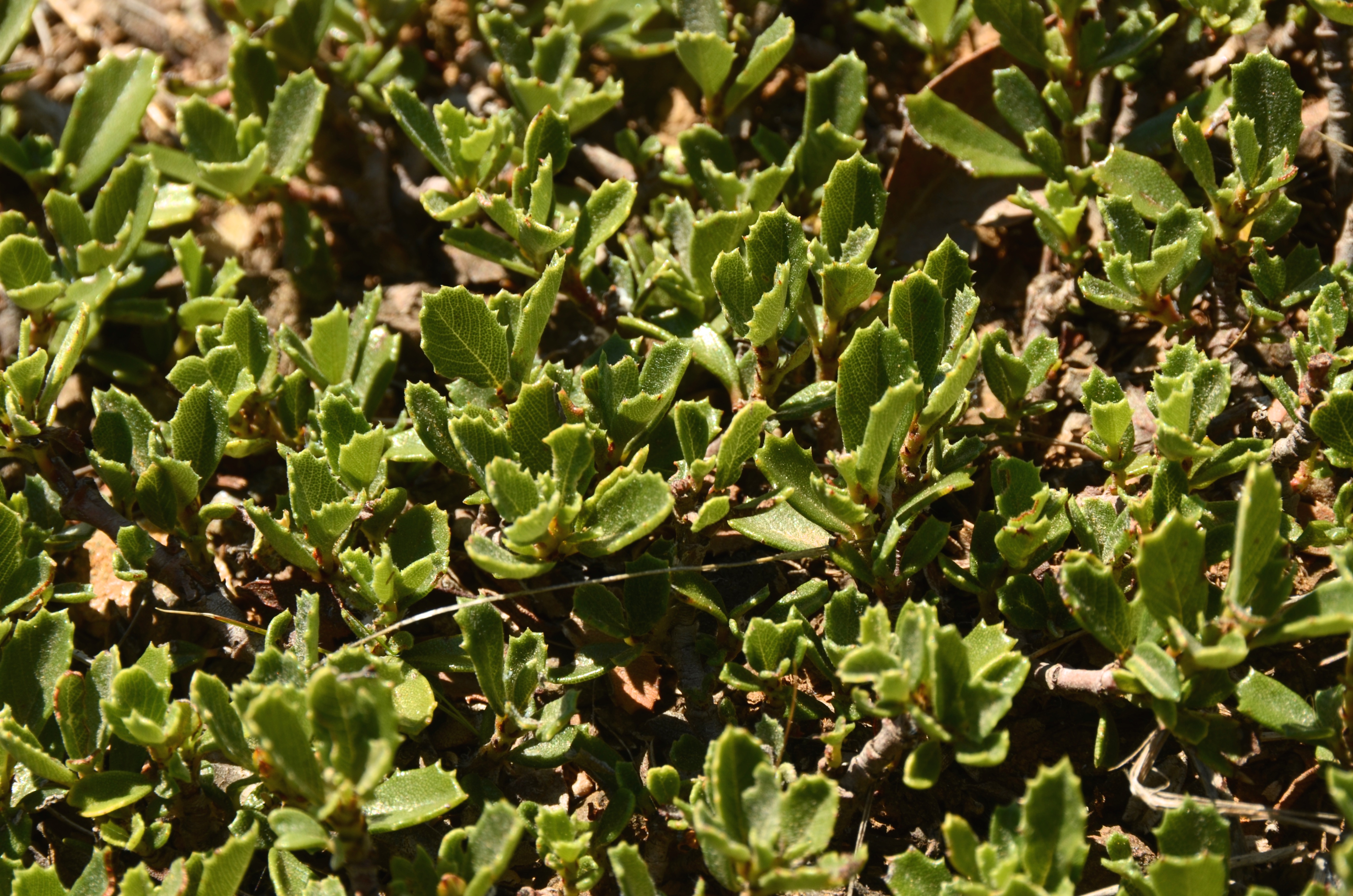
In Siskiyou County, California

Ceanothus prostratus is a decumbent (or "mat-forming") shrub, generally less than 0.3 metres (1 foot) tall and spreading laterally to up to 3 metres (10 feet). Its evergreen leaves are oppositely arranged and generally oval in shape with 3–9 sharp teeth along the margins. The inflorescence is umbel-like, with flowers of blue, purple, or lavender that bloom between April and June. Its fruit is small and rounded with horned lobes.

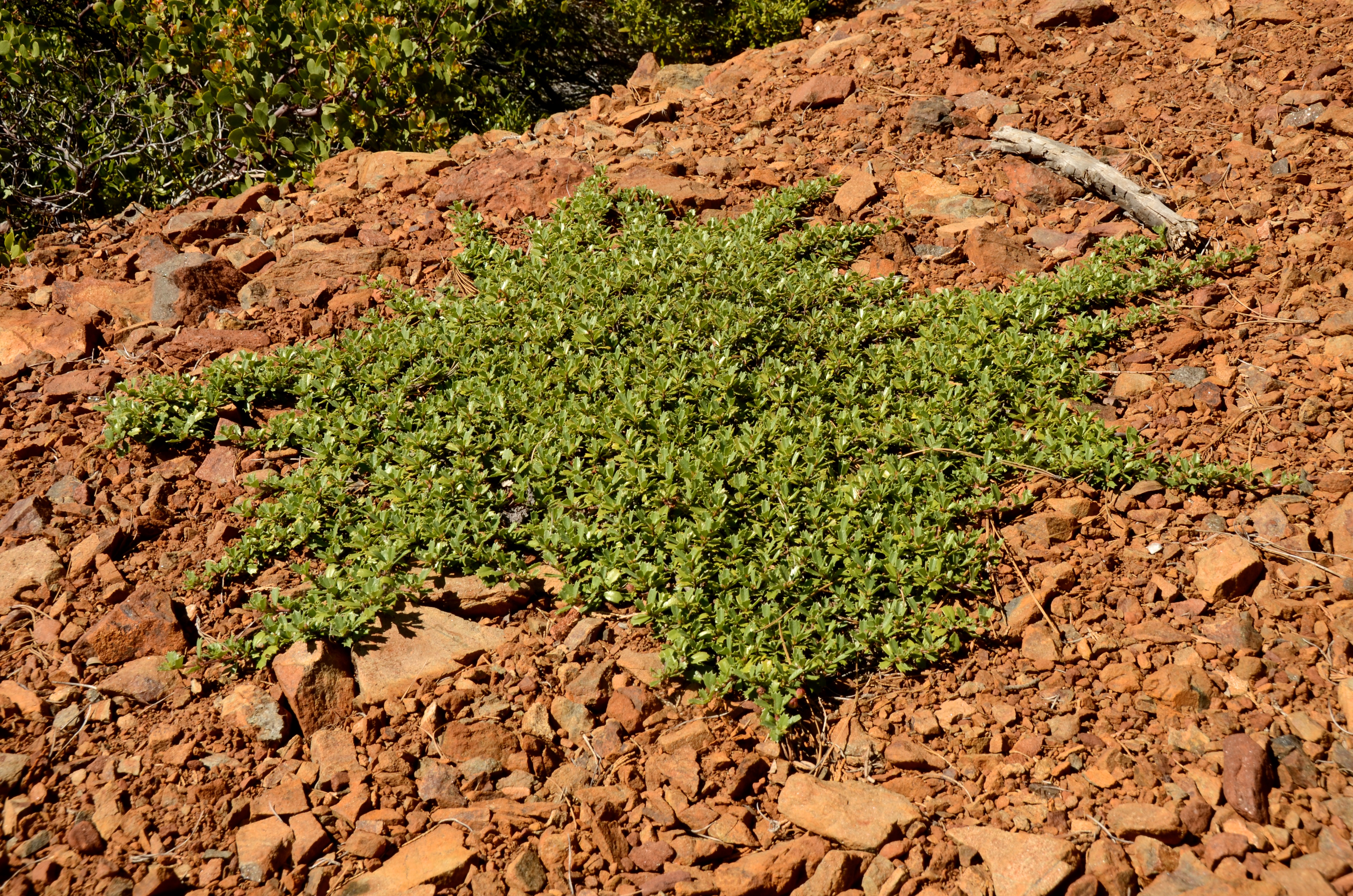
Ceanothus prostratus in Siskiyou County, California

== Varieties ==
There are two varieties of Ceanothus prostratus.

C. prostratus var. occidentalis (McMinn) occurs in the Coast Ranges and Klamath Mountains of northern California, ranging in elevation from 270 to 1400 m. It forms as more of a low mound than a mat, exhibits a leaf blade folded lengthwise, and has fruit with spreading horns.

C. prostratus var. prostratus is the more widespread of the two subspecies, covering the majority of the range of C. prostratus. It ranges in elevation from 800 to 2700 m throughout the Klamath Mountains, Coast Ranges, High Cascades, High Sierra Nevada, and the Modoc Plateau. C. prostratus var. prostratus forms as a mat, has a generally unfolded leaf, and produces fruit with erect horns.

== Distribution and habitat ==
Ceanothus prostratus is found throughout the Pacific Northwest, ranging through Washington, Oregon, western Idaho, western Nevada, and south into northern California. The southern extent of its natural range is the central Sierra Nevada mountains. Given its elevational range, this plant is also native to many of the other mountain ranges of the Pacific Northwest, including the Klamaths, Siskiyous, Cascades, and Warner Mountains.

Ceanothus prostratus grows in the understory of mixed conifer forests, from foothills to subalpine areas. It also inhabits open flats and ridges in areas of low chaparral as well as dry interior forest ecosystems. It can be found from elevations ranging between 270 and 2700 meters above sea level.

== Ecology ==
Ceanothus prostratus is part of the subgenus Cerastes, a clade of Ceanothus that is generally characterized by traits like opposite leaves, persistent corky stipules, and horned fruits (hence the name "Cerastes" which comes from the Greek for "having horns"). This subgenus likely began diversifying at the beginning of the Pliocene roughly 6 million years ago, when cool, dry conditions combined with the uplift of the Coast Ranges to create new and diverse habitats. The closest relatives of C. prostratus within the subgenus Cerastes are Ceanothus pinetorum and C. purpureus, based on a phylogeny produced in a 2011 paper.

Ceanothus prostratus is a common nitrogen-fixing shrub, often found with Purshia tridentata. Together, their combined nitrogen additions to the soil of their habitats may account for 10-60% of annual nitrogen input in those ecosystems. It is also one of only two plants (along with Ceanothus diversifolius) known to be a host for the parasitic plant Cuscuta jepsonii, a dodder which until recently was thought to be extinct but could still be surviving and parasitizing C. prostratus in northern California.

Ceanothus prostratus is one of many plants in the region that colonize logged areas, forming brushfields in the wake of timber harvests when more light reaches the ground.

Ceanothus prostratus is present in plant communities alongside species such as Abies magnifica, Arctostaphylos nevadensis, A. patula, Pinus albicaulis, Pinus contorta, P. jeffreyi, Pinus ponderosa, Quercus vaccinifolia, and Tsuga mertensiana.
