= Boggs Lake Ecological Reserve =

Nature reserve in Lake County, California

- IUCN category Ia (strict nature reserve)
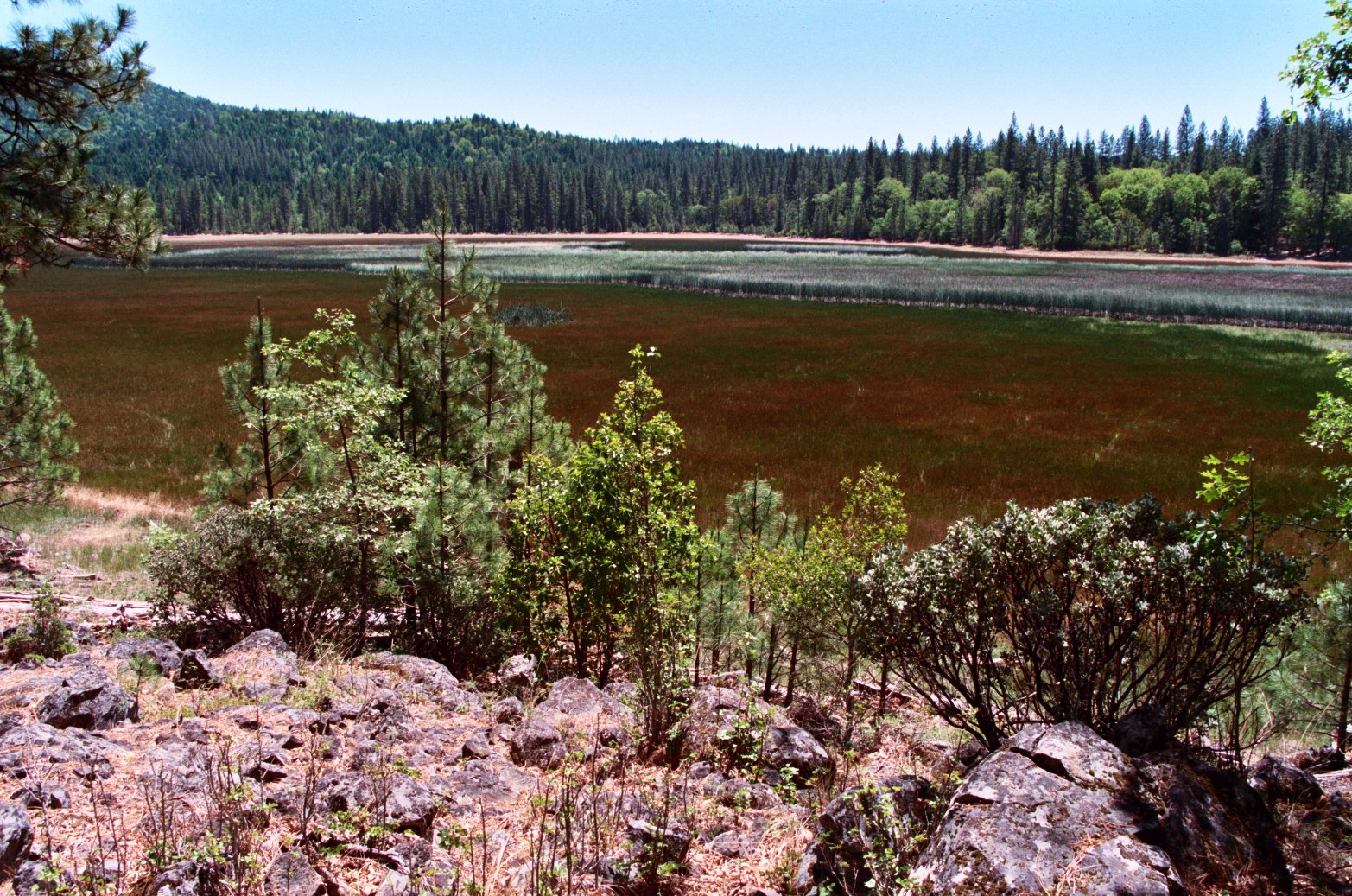
- Boggs Lake / vernal pool

- Location within California
- Location: Lake County, California
- Nearest city: Clearlake, California
- Coordinates: 38°53′12″N 122°46′36″W
- Established: 1973
- Governing body: The Nature Conservancy

The Boggs Lake Ecological Reserve is a nature reserve in Lake County, California. The land area is about one quarter of a square mile and contains a large vernal pool as well as endangered plants such as the Boggs Lake hedge-hyssop.

Boggs Lake is managed by the Nature Conservancy and the California Department of Fish and Game. It is 8 miles (13 km) south of Clear Lake and has a small parking area and hiking trail loop. The protective fence and interpretive signs were installed by the Nature Conservancy.

The lake lies in a volcanic depression lined with a very fine covering of volcanic ash a few feet deep that has compacted to become impervious to water. The lake surface covers about 90 acres (360,000 m^{2}) when it is full.

Originally a plant preserve of 101 acres (0.41 km^{2}) that resulted from the California Native Plant Society's (CNPS) efforts to save the land from development in 1973, it is today a protected area of sensitive habitat for several endangered plants and animals.

== History of Boggs Lake ==
The lake is named after Henry C. Boggs, who bought a combination grist mill and sawmill on the edge of the lake in the fall of 1866.

The area was formerly owned by the Fibreboard Corporation until the early 1970s when a group of California Native Plant Society (CNPS) members, botanists from the University of California and local residents asked the company to consider setting aside the vernal pool and an adjacent forest. Although an undisturbed area, there were logging operations in the forest as well as geothermal and recreational activities that posed a threat to the fragile ecosystem. Fibreboard agreed to the offer, donated the land in 1973 and CNPS contacted The Nature Conservancy to assist with stewardship and legal matters. Named the Boggs Lake Preserve, it was a little more than 100 acres (0.40 km^{2}) in size, included most of the lake and was immediately added to the portfolio of preserves managed by The Nature Conservancy.

The Boggs Lake Preserve Committee was created soon afterwards and spent the next 10 years mapping and monitoring rare plants of the preserve. The result of these scientific observations over a decade showed that the boundaries of the preserve were inadequate and did not protect some unique plant species growing outside the preserve. Off-road vehicle activity was increasing, both inside the preserve and in the surrounding area. Also, a housing development proposed near one side of the lake could cause algae growth from septic tank runoff infiltration. Logging and geothermal resource extraction were still possible impacts to the area.

In 1984 a new design for the preserve was drafted by the staff of The Nature Conservancy to address these issues. Based on the previous efforts of studying and managing the site, the expanded area added two major and six small parcels of the lake edge and a large meadow west of the lake to the original boundaries. These additions were obtained with donations from individuals, and the Dean Witter Foundation and the Goodhill Foundation. Another benefit from this purchase was connecting the preserve to the county road to providepublic access to the area.

The history of the Boggs Lake Ecological Reserve became a model for understanding what needs to be accomplished when the goal is to preserve lands having biological significance and diversity. In its early days, the Conservancy chose sites for protection based on opportunity rather than scientific analysis of the environment. Today, the information gathered and analysed is the driving force for selection of areas for preservation by the Conservancy.

== Flora and fauna ==
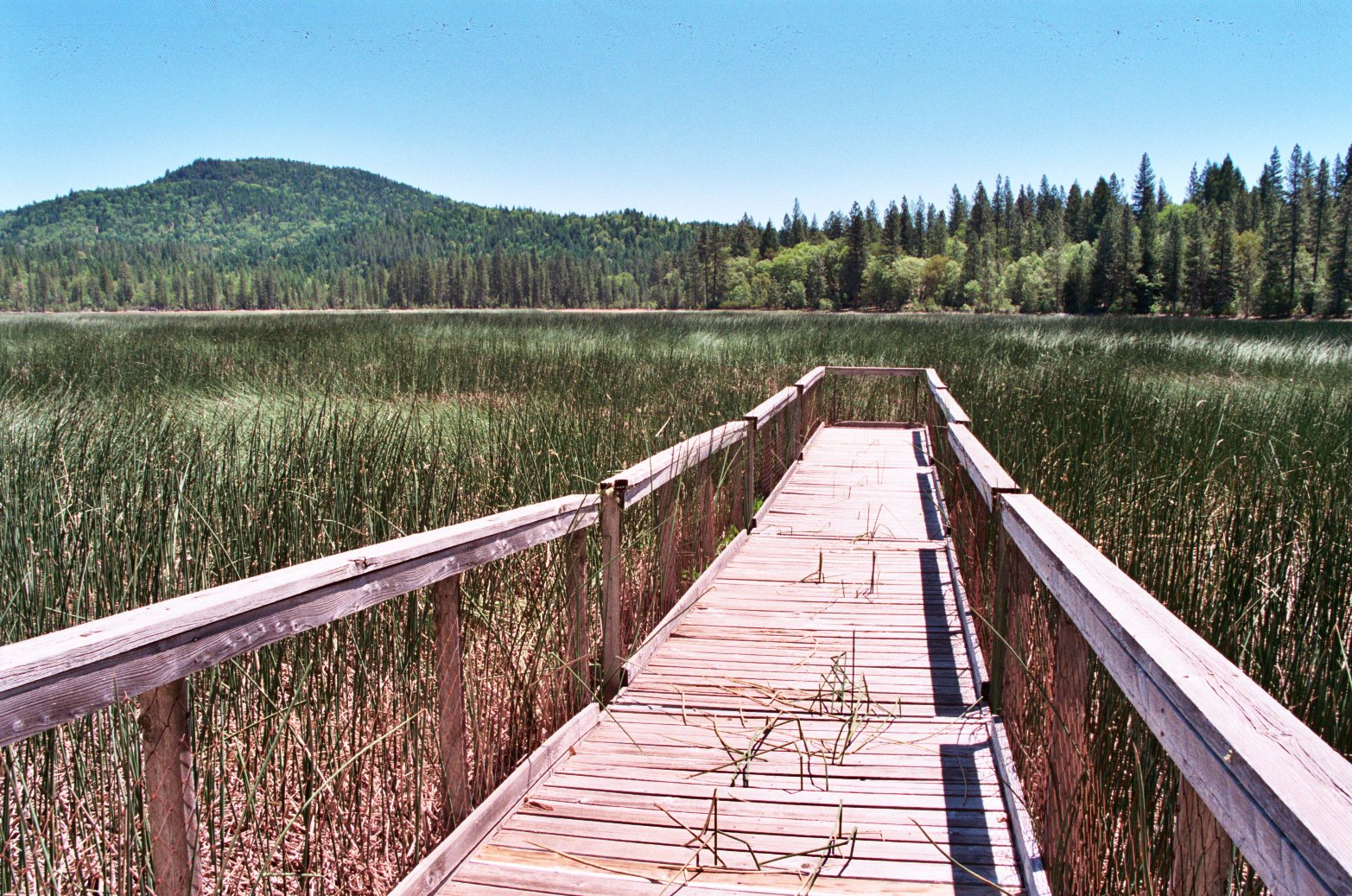
Boggs Lake boardwalk

The forest includes softwoods such as ponderosa pine and Douglas-fir and hardwoods such as black, canyon, and live oak trees, as well as madrone trees.

Other plants at Boggs Lake include poison oak, manzanita, wild pea, bracken fern, coyote thistle, wild mustard, and California or ground rose.

Wildlife include deer, coyote, jackrabbit, chipmunk, gray squirrel, raccoon, skunk, bobcat, and fox. Birds use the vernal pool as a rest stop on migration flights as well as year-round habitat. During a five-year period from 1982 to 1987, 139 species of birds were observed at Boggs Lake, including both bald and golden eagles. Other bird species seen are the pygmy nuthatch, pileated woodpecker, hermit warbler, purple martin, red-winged blackbird, ruddy duck, marsh wren, mallard, and California quail.

=== Endangered plants ===
The Boggs Lake hedge-hyssop was discovered in 1923 in Lake County. It grows to a height of about four inches and has lance-shaped leaves and small yellowish-white flowers that bloom from April to August. It is found in vernal pools, marshy areas, and at the edges of lakes and cattle ponds and can bloom in as many as two inches of water.

The few-flowered Navarretia is a member of the Phlox family and was first collected northwest of the town of Lower Lake in 1945. It is an annual herb with lobed leaves, grows to a height of almost two inches, and has tubular white or purple flower clusters. It germinates under water like many vernal pool species. May and June are when the plants bloom after the pool has dried.

=== Western pond turtle ===
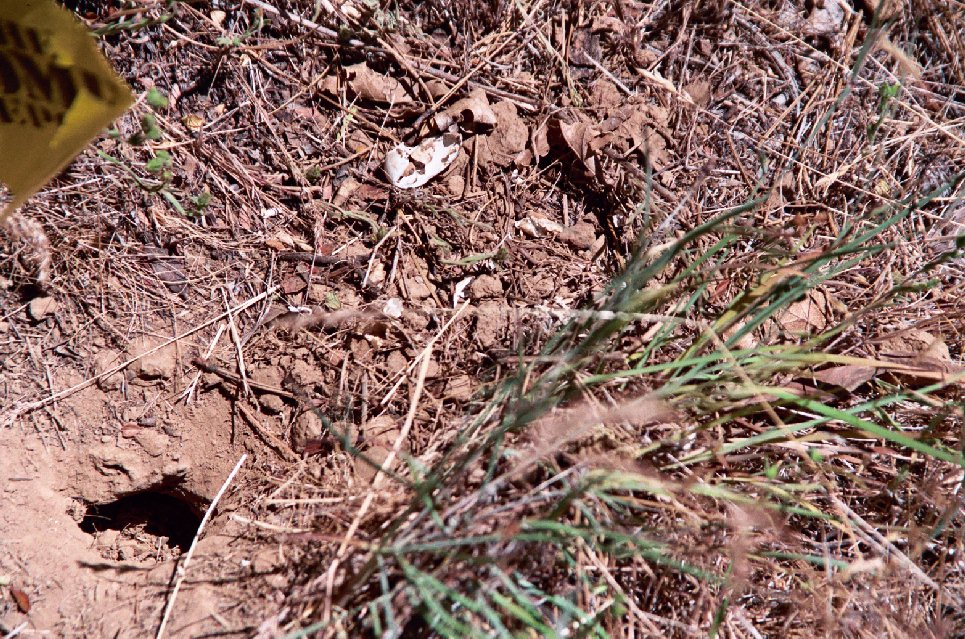
Depredated turtle nest showing broken egg in upper center of photo.

The western pond turtle (Clemmys marmorata also Actinemys marmorata) is one of several reptiles at Boggs Lake and is listed as a species of special concern by the California Department of Fish and Game (CDFG). Boggs Lake provides habitat for the western pond turtle. The preserve has water for feeding and body temperature regulation, as well as a nearby upland environment, which allows laying of eggs in areas not subject to submersion and basking areas (again, for regulation of body temperature).

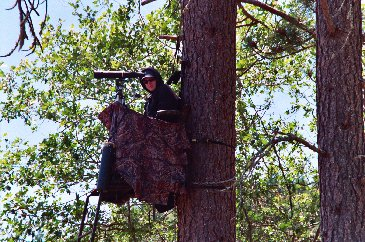
Sonoma State University student observing the western pond turtle at Boggs Lake Ecological Reserve.

In June 2008, Sonoma State University (SSU) began a study project at Boggs Lake with funds from SSU and the Sonoma County Fish and Wildlife Commission. The project goals are to prevent extinction and solve the temperature-sex mystery. Turtle eggs from Boggs Lake are being hatched at different temperatures to find out what temperature determines male or female. The turtles will eventually be released back to Boggs Lake. The western pond turtle has been impacted by destruction of habitat, where once they were common from Washington state to Baja California, now only can be found in isolated areas in Southern California and the Central Valley.

"Western Pond Turtles are a snapshot of what is happening to turtles in general. Turtles are in decline on a global basis." said Nick Geist, associate professor of Biology at SSU.

== See also ==
List of California Department of Fish and Game protected areas
