= Boggs Mountain Demonstration State Forest =

State forest in California

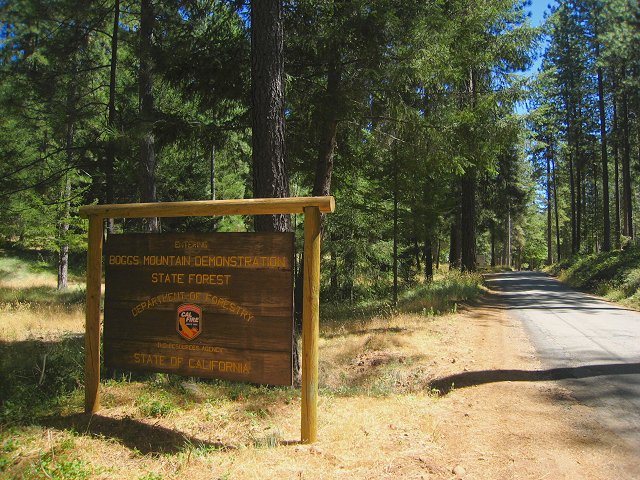
- Entrance to Boggs Mountain Demonstration State Forest on Forestry Rd., Cobb, CA

- Location within California Location within the United States
- Location: Lake County, California
- Nearest city: Cobb, California
- Coordinates: 38.82°N 122.69°W
- Area: 3,433 acres (14 km^{2})
- Established: 1949
- Governing body: Calfire

Boggs Mountain Demonstration State Forest is a state forest in Lake County, California that covers the northwest of Boggs Mountain. It was founded in 1949, and came into operation in 1950 when most of the site had been clear cut. The purpose was to demonstrate good practices in restoring and managing a forest. The state forest was open for recreational use, including camping, hiking, mountain biking etc. The 2015 Valley Fire destroyed 80% of the trees. The state forest as of 2021 was replanting saplings.

== Location ==
The forest is roughly halfway between Clear Lake and Calistoga. It is near the town of Cobb, about 10 miles (16 km) north of Middletown on Highway 175. It is about 50 miles (80 km) from the Pacific Ocean to the west, and about 75 miles (121 km) as the crow flies from San Francisco to the south.

Boggs Mountain is a prominent feature at the southeast end of the Clear Lake Volcanic Field. It is an elongated rolling highland. The mountain takes the form of a simple ridge crest from which long spurs run southeast to Putah Creek. Around 3,000 feet (910 m) above sea level the topography levels out. The upper part of the mountain is similar to a plateau cut by several drainage channels. The terrain of the state forest is gently rolling, with peaks at the north and south ends. It covers almost 3,500 acres (1,400 ha) of the mountain. Volcanic rock is visible in most parts of the forest.

== Vegetation ==
Lower down, most of the vegetation is chaparral, and manzanita is the most common species. Higher up there is (or was) a mixed forest of coast range Douglas fir (Pseudotsuga menziesii), ponderosa pine (Pinus ponderosa) and sugar pine (Pinus lambertiana). There are also small quantities of incense cedar (Calocedrus) and MacNab cypress (Cupressus macnabiana). Deciduous trees include canyon live oak (Quercus chrysolepis), black oak (Quercus kelloggii), dogwood (Cornus), and madrone (Arbutus).

== History ==
In December 1949 the California Division of Forestry (CDF), now officially renamed Cal-Fire, purchased 3,432 acres (13.89 km^{2}) of land and timber on the mountain for $38,000. The price was so low because the land held no timber of commercial value. The state bought the land from the Calso Company for $20,600, and bought most of the timber between 16 and 29 inches (410 and 740 mm) diameter at breast height from the Setzer Forest Products Company for $18,100.

Setzer completed cutting the remaining timber in 1950, and In 1954 all timber interests and titles were conveyed to the state. In the early years the state undertook limited inventory and mapping, but no timber was harvested. Cliff Fago became the first permanent forest manager in 1965, and completed the inventory. Between 1966 and 1976 the remaining old growth timber was removed.

The Valley Fire of 6 October 2015 burned many of the trees. The fire killed about 80% of the mature trees on the mountain and 95% of the regeneration growth in the understory. Cal-Fire undertook a reforestation plan of 3,100 acres (1,300 ha) of the state park. Thousands of dead trees were logged. Those with lumber value were sold, and the others piled up for burning in the future when conditions were safe. Natural regeneration included bracken, coffeeberry (Frangula californica), wild rose (Rosa californica), squaw carpet (Ceanothus prostratus), yerba buena, wild iris, dogwood (Cornus), madrone (Arbutus), and non-native, invasive Scotch broom (Cytisus scoparius).

In March 2017 about 312,000 eight-inch (200 mm) seedlings of Douglas fir, ponderosa pine and sugar pine had been planted, spaced at 13 feet (4.0 m) intervals. This was about one third of the planned plantings for the next two years. It would take ten years before the trees reached heights of 10 feet (3.0 m). In all, Cal-Fire planted almost 703,000 tree seedlings. including ponderosa pine, Douglas fir, sugar pine, incense cedar, and giant sequoia (Sequoiadendron giganteum).

== Operations ==
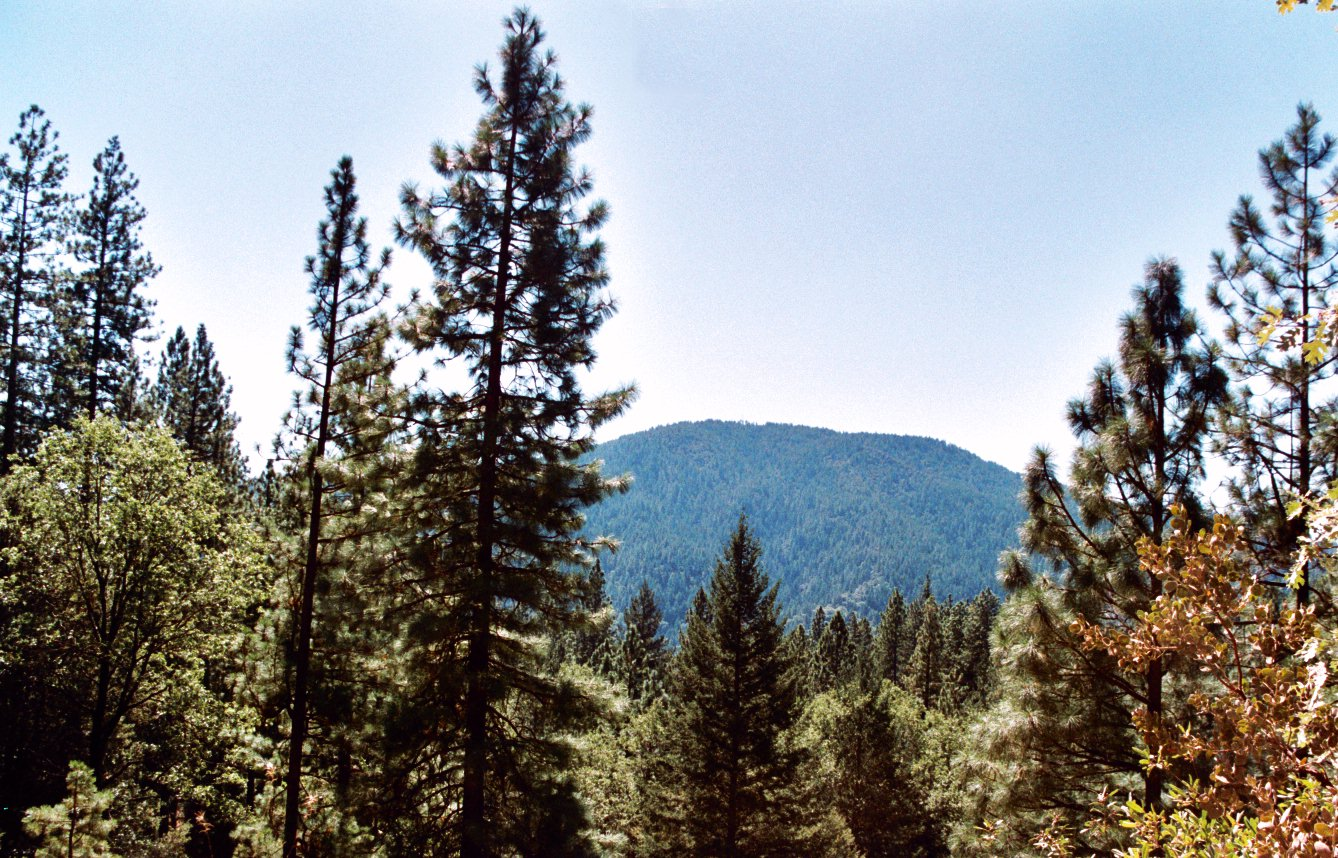
Bogg Mountain State Forest, Cobb Mountain in background

The California Department of Forestry (CDF) uses Boggs Mountain Demonstration State Forest to experiment with forest management techniques, which include firefighting and logging. The forest management program has aimed for a managed all-age forest, and has included studies of disease control, fertilization and reforestation. The state forest has an active timber sale program, and is managed so as to yield timber sustainably.

As of 1993 there was an interpretive nature trail beside the Cobb Elementary School. Group tours of the forest could be arranged with the forest manager. CDF also maintains a helicopter base at Boggs Mountain which was established in 1972 for fire and rescue operations and provides coverage for Mendocino National Forest to the north, San Francisco Bay Area to the south and the Sacramento Valley to the east.

== Research ==
Between 1952 and 2005 ten 2.5 hectares (6.2 acres) plots had each been measured ten times, with all trees more than 11 inches (280 mm) diameter at breast height being mapped. Tree heights were sampled. There were also four continuous forest inventory (CFI) measurements of these plots at five year intervals from 1991 to 2006. As of 1993 two harvests had used horses to skid logs so as to minimize damage to the remaining trees. Horse logging was also in part used to monitor how timber harvesting affects the spread of black stain root disease. Studies have been made of the occurrence, spread and control of annosus root disease. Research has been conducted into precommercial thinning, including use of machinery to thin and release ponderosa pine.

Bark beetles (Dendroctonus brevicomis and Dendroctonus ponderosae) mostly breed in unhealthy trees. Vulnerability to infection may be caused by drought, flooding, fire and air pollution, and possibly by needle casts, dwarf mistletoe (Arceuthobium), true mistletoe (Phoradendron) and root pathogens. A 1965 study showed that Boggs Mountain had moderate but chronic mortality from bark beetles in ponderosa pine. 71.2% of beetle-infested trees had root diseases, but few trees with root diseases died until they became infested by bark beetles. The fungus Heterobasidion annosum was the only fungus found at Boggs Mountain is association with bark beetles.

Sugar pine scale (Matsucoccus paucicicatrices) has been found on two sugar pine saplings in the state forest. It was causing twig- and top-kill of the saplings that resembled white pine blister rust (Cronartium ribicola) cankers. The disease may predispose trees to bark beetle attack.

Obsidian hydration occurs when the surface of a piece of obsidian is exposed, and obsidian hydration dating is often used in archaeology. In the spring of 1998 experiments were made to find the effect of forest fires on obsidian hydration bands. Samples of obsidian with measured hydration bands were placed on the ground in the path of small broadcast burns and a slash pile burn. The experiments showed that hydration bands were indeed damaged, and that the severity of the fire might be a more important factor than its intensity.

== Recreation ==
As of 2021 the mountain was open for day use, with limited overnight camping at Calso Camp. The other group campgrounds were closed. Pets must be leashed and under control. Boggs Mountain is open all year for hiking, and is accessible through a system of easy roads and trails. The 14.8 kilometres (9.2 mi) Boggs Mountain Loop is rated moderate, with an elevation gain of 439 metres (1,440 ft). It is not heavily used, and is open to dogs and horses. For mountain bikers the forest's single-track trails are moderately difficult and moderately aerobic. Most of the biking terrain is at an elevation of 3,000 feet (910 m), and the trails run through open woods and meadows, with some short, steep hills.

== Sources ==
- Anderson, Glenda (May 4, 2017), "Restoration inches forward at Boggs Mountain forest burned by Valley fire", The Press Democrat
- BMDSF Draft Management Plan, 2008
- Bohns, Michael; Rice, Jesse (2005), California Forest Pest Conditions, California Forest Pest Council
- Boggs Demonstration Forest, CAL FIRE
- Boggs Mountain Loop, AllTrails, LLC
- "Boggs Mountain", summitpost.org
- Brown, Ann Marie (April 10, 2012), Moon Northern California Biking: More Than 160 of the Best Rides for Road and Mountain Biking, Avalon Publishing, ISBN 978-1-61238-313-2
- Cobb, F.W.; Parmeter, J.R.; Wood, D.L.; Stark, R.W. (1974), "Root pathogens as agents predisposing ponderosa pine and white fir to bark beetles", in E. G. Kuhlman (ed.), Fomes Annosus: Proceedings ..., Southeastern Forest Experiment Station, Forest Service, USDA
- Draft Environmental Impact Report for Geothermal Exploration Permit, Boggs Mountain State Forest, Lake County, Ca, The Commission, 1976
- Forest Service (1994), Final Supplemental Environmental Impact Statement on Management of Habitat for Late-successional and Old-growth Forest Related Species Within the Range of the Northern Spotted Owl, vol. II–Appendices, Interagency SEIS Team
- Goodyear, W.A. (1890), "Lake County", Report of the State Mineralogist, San Francisco: California Department of Conservation, Division of Mines and Geology
- Kinloch, Bohun B. Jr.; Scheuner, William H., Sugar Pine: Pinaceae -- Pine family, USDA
- Lake County Planning Department (May 1989a), Cobb Mountain Area Plan (PDF) (Preliminary Draft)
- Loyd, Janine M.; Origer, Thomas M.; Fredrickson, David Allen (2002), The Effects of Fire and Heat on Obsidian, U.S. Department of the Interior, Bureau of Land Management
- Lundquist, Erica (February 2010), Kelsey Creek Watershed Assessment (PDF), Big Valley Watershed Council, archived from the original (PDF) on April 22, 2021
- Mauldin, Henry (1995), Mountains & Pioneers of Lake County, Earthen Vessels Productions, Inc, pp. 11–13
- Rabin, Lawrence A.; Oliver, William W.; Powers, Robert F.; Ritchie, Martin W.; Busse, Matt D.; Knapp, Eric E (2009), Historical Growth Plots in the Pacific Southwest, U.S. Department of Agriculture, Forest Service, Pacific Southwest Research Station
- USDA (1993), Demonstration Forests in California: A Directory, U.S. Department of Agriculture, Forest Service, Pacific Southwest Research Station
