= Howard Springs, California =

Howard Springs
- Resort
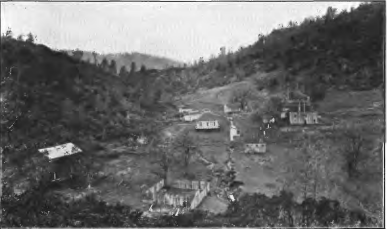
- The resort c. 1910

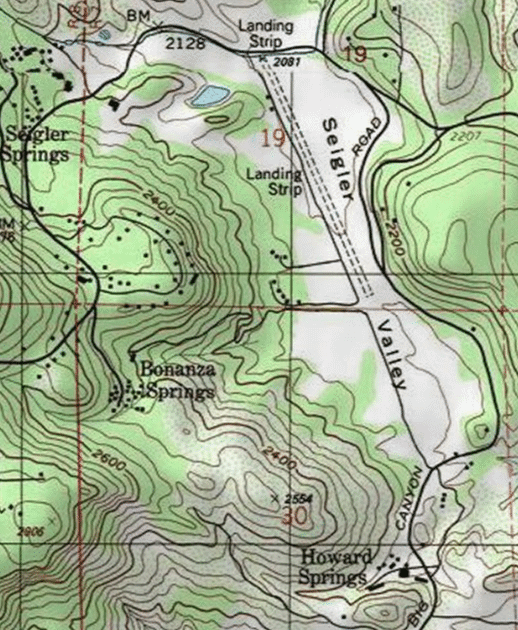
- Howard Springs (bottom left) below the Paul Hoberg Airport

- Location in California Howard Springs (the United States)
- Coordinates: 38.8582°N 122.6746°W
- Country: United States
- State: California
- County: Lake County
- Elevation: 2,170 ft (660 m)

Howard Springs is a set of springs turned into a resort in the 1870s in Lake County, California. The resort catered primarily to people interested in the curative powers of the mineral waters. Guests were accommodated in cabins or tents. At one time it had an official post office. The resort changed hands many times over the years, with various changes to the lodge, accommodations and bathhouses, until closing in 1970. For a period it was leased for geothermal exploration. Today it has reopened as a health resort.

== Location ==
Howard Springs is located 3.5 miles (5.6 km) north-northeast of Whispering Pines. They are 7 miles (11 km) southwest of Lower Lake and 14 miles (23 km) northwest of Middletown. It is at an elevation of 2165 feet (660 m).

== Springs ==
The springs are in a line about 50 yards (46 m) long at the foot of a slope along the south side of a drainage course. They are on the edge of a small basin, surrounded by rolling hills. There are about 40 separate flows, with temperatures that range from 65 to 110 °F (18 to 43 °C). The springs all rise in an area of serpentinite within the shales and sandstones of which the hills in the vicinity are composed.

As of 1909 about 26 springs had been dug out and cemented to form drinking basins. The most important for drinking, with their temperatures, were: Bohemia, 66 °F (19 °C); Neptune, 70 °F (21 °C); Lithia, 73 °F (23 °C) and Magnesia Twins, 71 and 100 °F (22 and 38 °C). Bohemia discharged about 1 US gallon (3.8 L; 0.83 imp gal) per minute. The three largest springs were mainly used for bathing. Hot Soda or Hot Sulphur Spring had a temperature of 110 °F (43 °C) and discharged about 125 US gallons (470 L; 104 imp gal) per minute into a plunge bath. Excelsior or Borax Spring had a temperature of 95 °F (35 °C) and discharged about 5 US gallons (19 L; 4.2 imp gal) per minute into a plunge bath. Eureka Spring had a temperature of 107 °F (42 °C) and was piped to tub baths.

== History ==
The first settler at what became Howard Springs seems to have been J.M. Collins, who arrived in 1863 and stayed for a year. James W. Howard bought the Cushman Farm in Seigler valley on 4 December 1869, excluding the springs. He later acquired the springs, which are shown as "Howard's Springs" on an 1875 map, and published his first advertisement for Howard Springs on 13 March 1876. In 1877 C.W. Howard opened the springs to the public. He provided camping space and built a lodge, cabins and bathing pools. Early in 1878 Howard sold the springs resort to August Heisch. Heisch had died by August 1882, and his widow Caroline Heisch became owner. In October 1887 she sold the resort to Philip and Margaretha Sieben.

On 30 April 1891 Charles Louis Adolph Scott bought the property. In 1892 it became home to the Putah Post Office and Scott was appointed postmaster. Mrs. R.J. Beeby bought the resort in 1896, and took over as postmaster. At this time there was an L-shaped lodge and a 2-story annex. The post office closed in 1900.

There is a gap in the ownership records, but on 29 October 1907 Minnie W. and Edgar E. Laymance sold the resort to the Howard Springs Company, partly owned by the Laymance fsmily. The resort by 1909 had a stable, two large lodge buildings, cabins, tent platforms and bathhouses. Sale of bottled water from Lithia, Bohemia and Eureka springs had been discontinued some years before 1909. In 1909 there was a hotel building with a large annex, the baths and four or five small cottages. As of 1914 only 14 springs were in active use. They were owned by W.J. Laymance of Oakland and leased by R.J. Yates. There were accommodations for 80, mostly in cottages. Water from the Hot Iron & Sulphur spring was fed to the bath house.

On 11 May 1921 Harold W. Jewett bought the resort. By 1926 Jesse P. Francisco was the owner, and ran it with his wife Cora. In November 1929 the lodge and other buildings burned down, apart from two cabins and two bathhouses. The Franciscos built a large new 2-story lodge in a new location, and several small cabins. The pools and bathhouses were rebuilt in concrete. Francisco sold the resort to the Pappas brothers in October 1945. They made various renovations and additions to the buildings, and by 1948 had 64 cabin units, some in multi-unit buildings. They ran the resort until after the 1970 season, when it was finally closed.

From 1975 to 1983 Republic Geothermal had leases for exploration on 1,300 acres (530 ha), including Howard Springs. They made two 500 feet (150 m) test wells on the property. Today the property is called Avalon Springs. It is described as an "experiential learning environment, anchored by a healing hot springs retreat center and eco-village."

== Reference bibliography ==
- Avalon Springs Healing Retreat & Eco-Village, Arkin Tilt Architects
- Durham, David L. (1998). California's Geographic Names: A Gazetteer of Historic and Modern Names of the State. Clovis, California: Word Dancer Press. p. 81. ISBN 1-884995-14-4.
- Hamilton, Fletcher (July 1915), "Report of State Mineralogist, 1913-1914", Appendix to the Journals of the Senate and Assembly of the forty-second session of the Legislature of the State of California, vol. VII
- "Howard Springs", Geographic Names Information System, United States Geological Survey, United States Department of the Interior
- Mobley, Charles M. (23 January 2013), The History of Howard Springs [the land now known as Avalon Springs, South Lake County Historical Society
- Waring, Gerald Ashley (1915). Springs of California. U.S. Geological Survey Water Supply Paper. Vol. 338. U.S. Government Printing Office. doi:10.3133/wsp338.
