= Mount Hannah =

Mountain in California, United States

- Location within California

Highest point
- Elevation: 3,978 feet (1,212 m)
- Prominence: 1,338 feet (408 m)
- Isolation: 7.94 kilometres (4.93 mi) to Cobb Mountain
- Coordinates: 38.887258°N 122.746296°W

Geography
- Country: United States
- State: California
- County: Lake County

Geology
- Mountain type: Lava dome
- Volcanic zone: Clear Lake volcanic field

Mount Hannah is a mountain in the Mayacamas Mountains of the Northern California Coast Ranges. It is in Lake County, California.

== Location ==
Mount Hannah is in Lake County, California. It is one of the mountains in the Cobb Mountain Area, many of which have volcanic origin. Others are Cobb Mountain, the most dominant, Seigler Mountain and Boggs Mountain. There are isolated small valleys and basins between the mountain peaks.

Mount Hannah has an elevation of 3,692 feet (1,125 m). Clean prominence is 1,338 feet (408 m). Isolation is 7.94 kilometres (4.93 mi). The nearest higher neighbor is Cobb Mountain to the south.

== Geology ==
Mount Hannah formed quite quickly during a polarity transition. It was built up by a number of closely-spaced eruptions. Three of the dacites in the Mount Hannah sequence have been dated to between 0.90 and 0.92 million years ago. There are indications that there may be a crustal magma chamber about 10–15 kilometres (6.2–9.3 mi) in diameter and a depth of 15 kilometres (9.3 mi) below Mount Hannah, with a temperature above 550 °C (1,022 °F).

== Sources ==
- Iyer, H.M.; Oppenheimer, David H; Hitchcock, Tim; Roloff, Jeffrey N.; Coakley, John M. (1980), "Large Teleseismic P-Wave Delays in the Geysers-Clear Lake Geothermal Area", U.S. Geological Survey Professional Paper, U.S. Government Printing Office
- Kirmse, Andrew, "Mount Hannah, California", Peakbagger
- Lake County Planning Department (May 1989), Cobb Mountain Area Plan (PDF) (Preliminary Draft)
