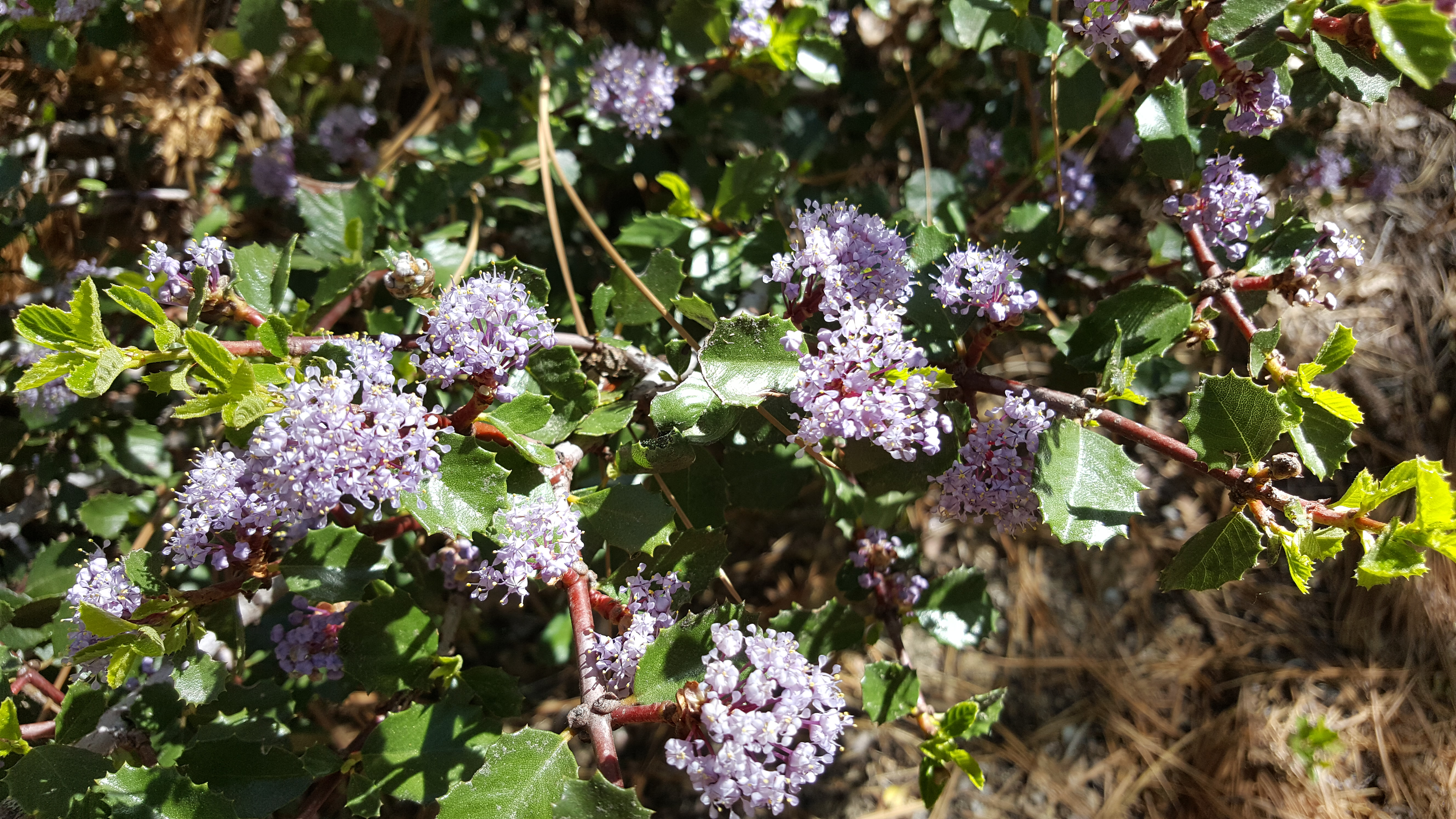

Conservation status
- Vulnerable (NatureServe)

Scientific classification
- Kingdom: Plantae
- Clade: Tracheophytes
- Clade: Angiosperms
- Clade: Eudicots
- Clade: Rosids
- Order: Rosales
- Family: Rhamnaceae
- Genus: Ceanothus
- Species: C. pinetorum

Binomial name
- Ceanothus pinetorum Coville

= Ceanothus pinetorum =

Species of flowering plant

Ceanothus pinetorum is a species of shrub in the family Rhamnaceae known by the common names Kern ceanothus and Coville ceanothus. It is endemic to California. Its common name reflects that it was originally known only from the Kern Plateau, a section of the southern Sierra Nevada featuring wide meadows and ridges. A disjunct population is known from the Trinity Mountains.

== Description ==
This is a low-lying shrub forming a bush or mat under a meter tall but up to about 8 meters in spreading width. The evergreen leaves are oppositely arranged and generally under 2 centimeters long, each firm and hairless with a toothed edge. The inflorescence is a small cluster of blue to off-white flowers yielding horned, wrinkled fruits just under a centimeter long.
