= Paul Hoberg Airport =

Former airport in Lake County, California

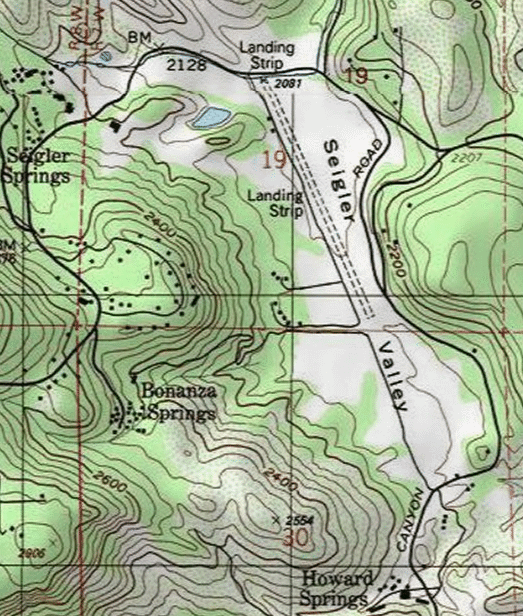
- IATA: none; ICAO: none

Summary
- Opened: 1947
- Closed: by 1982
- Elevation AMSL: 635 m (2,083 ft)
- Coordinates: 38.86959°N 122.67621°W

Map
- Location within California Location within the United States

Runways
Direction	Length		Surface
Direction	ft	m	Surface
34	5,000	1,524	paved

The Paul Hoberg Airport, or simply Hobergs Airport is an abandoned airport in Lake County, California, United States. It was opened in 1947 for use by guests of the nearby Hoberg's Resort, and was busy until the 1960s. By 1982 it had been abandoned.

== Location ==
The Paul Hoberg Airport was just below Seigler Springs Resort, 5 miles (8.0 km) southeast of Hoberg's Resort. It was 3 miles (4.8 km) east of Loch Lomond. The airport is at an elevation of 635 metres (2,083 ft). The region has a Köppen climate classification of Csb: Warm-summer Mediterranean climate.

== Runway ==
The airport had a fully paved 5,000 feet (1,500 m) runway, 125 feet (38 m) wide, and was capable of landing commercial aircraft. According to George Harper, who flew there in 1948 and 1949, "The runway went up about 5 degrees, tree-lined, you landed up & took off down. In the summer you had best arrive & depart before 10 am hot thermals." There was one small hangar on the northwest side.

== History ==
Hoberg's Resort in the Cobb Mountain area was founded in 1885 and became California's largest privately owned resort. Big name bands played there in the 1940s and 1950s, and it was frequented by celebrities. It was capable of serving dinner to 1,000 guests.

The Paul Hoberg Airport was dedicated in 1947. 2,250 people attended the dedication, and there were 102 aircraft. A Western Airlines Douglas DC-3 cargo carrier flew out on the dedication flight with a cargo of Bartlett pears grown in Lake County. Frank and George Hoberg both owned four small passenger planes. They both flew guests of Hoberg's resort to and from the resort.

Airmen frequented the nearby Seigler springs resort for mineral baths, swimming, gold or meals, though they were not particularly welcome at the family-oriented establishment. After ownership passed to Dorothy and Ernest Olsen, airmen were encouraged to visit, and as many as 125 aircraft could be seen at the airport at once. In 1963 the California Council Airmen's Association selected Seigler Springs for a State fly-in.

In the mid 1950s the airport supported air tankers for aerial firefighting. George Hoberg's wife donated the airport to Lake County because she was concerned about liability if there were an accident. The Hoberg family sold Hoberg's resort in 1971, but apparently the airport was not included in the sale. A 1982 road atlas labelled it "Hobergs Airport (Abandoned)".

== Sources ==
- Freeman, Paul (16 December 2020), "Paul Hoberg Airport, Siegler Springs, CA", Abandoned & Little-Known Airfields: California: Santa Rosa Area
- Hoberg, Donna (2007), Resorts of Lake County, Arcadia Publishing, ISBN 978-0-7385-4798-5
- Jackson, Howard W. (March 1965), "Hot Springs", Flying Magazine, ISSN 0015-4806
- "Paul Hoberg Airport (historical), Lake County, California, United States", mindat
- "Paul Hoberg Airport", Geographic Names Information System, United States Geological Survey, United States Department of the Interior, 1 March 1994
