= George Hoberg =

George Gustave Hoberg
- Born: 29 January 1904; Hoberg's Resort, Lake County, California, US
- Died: 29 January 1970 (aged 66); Hoberg's Resort, Lake County, California, US
- Occupation: Businessman

George Gustave Hoberg (29 January 1904 – 19 July 1970) was a Californian businessman. With his brothers he ran Hoberg's Resort in Lake County, California for many years.

== Life ==
George Hoberg was born at Hoberg's Resort on 29 January 1904. His grandfather had started the resort in 1885. Hoberg graduated from Cogswell College in San Francisco. In 1927 he married Gertrude Azalea Suhr (1908–1984). In 1934 George and his brothers Paul and Frank took over operation of the resort. Hoberg's became California's largest privately owned resort. Big name bands played there in the 1940s and 1950s, and it was frequented by celebrities. It was capable of serving dinner to 1,000 guests.

The Paul Hoberg Airport was dedicated in 1947, 5 miles (8.0 km) southeast of Hoberg's Resort. Frank and George Hoberg both owned four small passenger planes, and both flew guests of Hoberg's resort to and from the resort. George Hoberg earned the title of "Mr. Lake County" for the persistent energy he put into promoting Lake County. On 14 January 1958 in San Francisco he was elected chairman of the California Senate's Citizens Advisory Committee on Recreation, State Beaches and Parks. He led the effort to achieve a southerly diversion of the Eel River in Lake County.

The resort was busy until the 1960s, when Hoberg's and other large Lake County resorts began to suffer from growing competition from more distant tourist destinations and more convenient convention centers in the cities. The Hobergs ran into financial difficulties. George Hoberg died at Hoberg's Resort on 19 July 1970. He was buried at Glenbrook Cemetery, Cobb, Lake County, California. On 13 August 1970 Robert Leggett paid tribute to Hoberg in the United States House of Representatives. In mid-1972 the Lakeport Vista Point Tourist Information Center was dedicated in his memory. For two years after his death the family ran Hoberg's as a boarding school. In 1974 they sold the resort to Maharishi International University.

== Memberships ==
Hoberg was president of the Lake County Chamber of Commerce from 1937 to 1948. He was president of the Redwood Empire Association from 1944 to 1947. For many years he was a director of the California Hotel Association. He was district chairman of the California Chamber of Commerce from 1939 to 1944. He was a member of the California Highway Commission. George Hoberg belonged to the Shriners, the Freemasons, the Native Sons of the Golden West, the Footprinters Association, (Note: The Footprinters Association was founded on 11 May 1929 in Fresno, California to promote community support for law enforcement, sponsor worthy movements and children's charities in particular, and promote the true spirit of Americanism.) the Lions Clubs International, the Benevolent and Protective Order of Elks and the Loyal Order of Moose.

== Sources ==
- California Senate (1972), Senate Bills, California Legislature
- Chelsea (18 July 2013), "George Gustave Hoberg", FindAGrave
- Fox, Sandra (30 September 2003), "Gertrude Azalea Suhr Hoberg", FindAGrave
- Freeman, Paul (16 December 2020), "Paul Hoberg Airport, Siegler Springs, CA", Abandoned & Little-Known Airfields: California: Santa Rosa Area
- Hoberg, Donna (2007), Resorts of Lake County, Arcadia Publishing, ISBN 978-0-7385-4798-5
- Howell, Winnie I. (secretary) (1959), Journal of the Senate, Legislature of the State of California, California State Printing Office
- Leggett, Robert L. (13 August 1970), Tribute to George Hoberg (PDF), US House of Representatives
- Our History, International Footprint Association
