= Valley Fire =

2015 wildfire in Northern California

- Part of the 2015 California wildfires
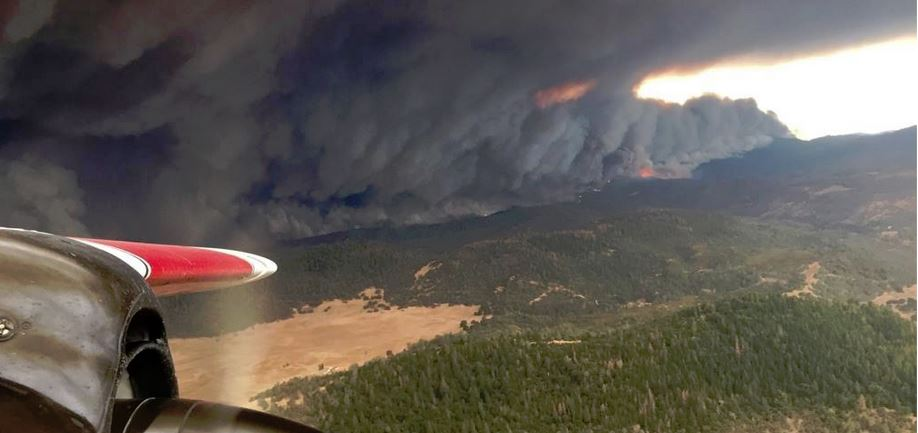
- The fire created a wall of flames and smoke across Lake County, California.
- Date: September 12 –; October 15, 2015; (33 days)
- Location: Lake County, Northern California, United States

Statistics
- Burned area: 76,067 acres (30,783 ha; 119 sq mi; 308 km^{2})

Impacts
- Deaths: 4
- Injuries: 4 (firefighters)
- Structures lost: 1,955 structures destroyed; 93 structures damaged
- Cost: ≥$1.5 billion; (equivalent to about $1.93 billion in 2024)

Ignition
- Cause: Faulty outdoor electrical wiring

The Valley Fire was a wildfire during the 2015 California wildfire season that started on September 12 in Lake County, California. It began shortly after 1:00 pm near Cobb with multiple reports of a small brush fire near the intersection of High Valley and Bottlerock Roads. It quickly spread and by 6:30 PM PDT, it had burned more than 10,000 acres (40 km^{2}). By Sunday, the thirteenth of September, the fire had reached 50,000 acres (202 km^{2}) and had destroyed much of Cobb, Middletown, Whispering Pines, and parts in the south end of Hidden Valley Lake. The fire ultimately spread to 76,067 acres (308 km^{2}), killed four people and destroyed nearly 2,000 buildings, before it was fully contained on October 15, 2015, causing at least $921 million (equivalent to $1.25 billion in 2025) in insured property damage. At the time, the fire was the third-most destructive fire in California history, based on the total structures burned, but the Camp Fire (2018) and the North Complex Fire in 2020 exceeded that total.

== Progression ==
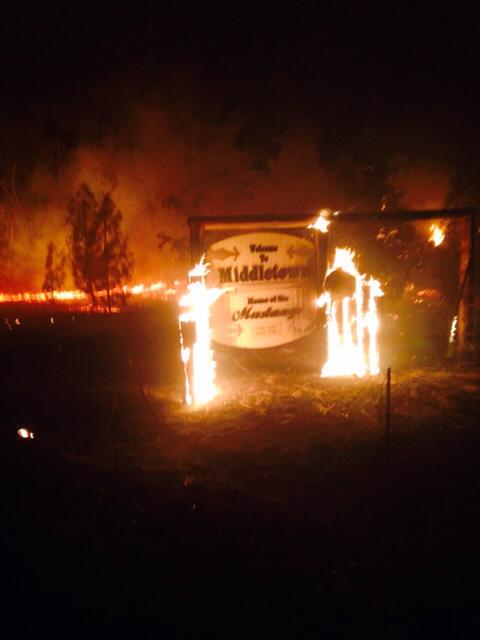
Middletown sign burning on September 13

The fire quickly spread into Middletown and Hidden Valley, threatening northern Sonoma County around The Geysers, and northern Napa County, approaching Pope Valley and Angwin.

In the first few hours of the fire, four CAL FIRE firefighters from the Boggs Mountain helitack crew suffered second-degree burns while engaging in initial attack on the fire. They were airlifted to the UC Davis Medical Center for treatment, where they were listed in stable condition.

On September 12, mandatory evacuation orders were issued for Cobb, Middletown, Loch Lomond, Harbin Hot Springs, Hidden Valley Lake, the Clearlake Riviera, Riviera West, and Soda Bay communities of unincorporated parts of Kelseyville, Pope Valley and Angwin. Evacuation centers were established in the town of Kelseyville to the northwest and Calistoga to the southeast.

This area is home to at least 10,000 residents. By midnight of the first day, scores of homes and businesses had been destroyed in Middletown, along with at least 50 homes in Cobb as well as the entire Hoberg’s Resort, an historic retreat built in the 1880s. The resort community of Harbin Hot Springs was also destroyed. On September 13, officials from Cal Fire confirmed that more than 1000 homes had been destroyed.

On October 15, 2015, the Valley Fire was fully contained, at 76,076 acres (307.87 km^{2}). The total cost of fighting the Valley Fire was estimated by the National Interagency Fire Center at $56.2 million.

== Effects ==
The remains of one woman killed in the fire in Anderson Springs were found on September 13. On September 17, remains of two bodies were found in Anderson Springs and Hidden Valley Lake.

On September 23, Lake County deputies found human remains that belonged to a missing Cobb resident. It was confirmed to be the fourth fatality resulting from the fire.

The fire destroyed 1,955 structures, including 1,322 homes, 27 apartment buildings and 73 businesses. An additional 93 buildings were damaged.

The California Department of Insurance estimated the insured losses from the Valley Fire at approximately $700 million. Insurance company Aon Benfield Inc. estimated that damages were at least $1.5 billion, including $925 million in insured losses and $575 million in damage to infrastructure and other federal/state government property.

== Aftermath ==
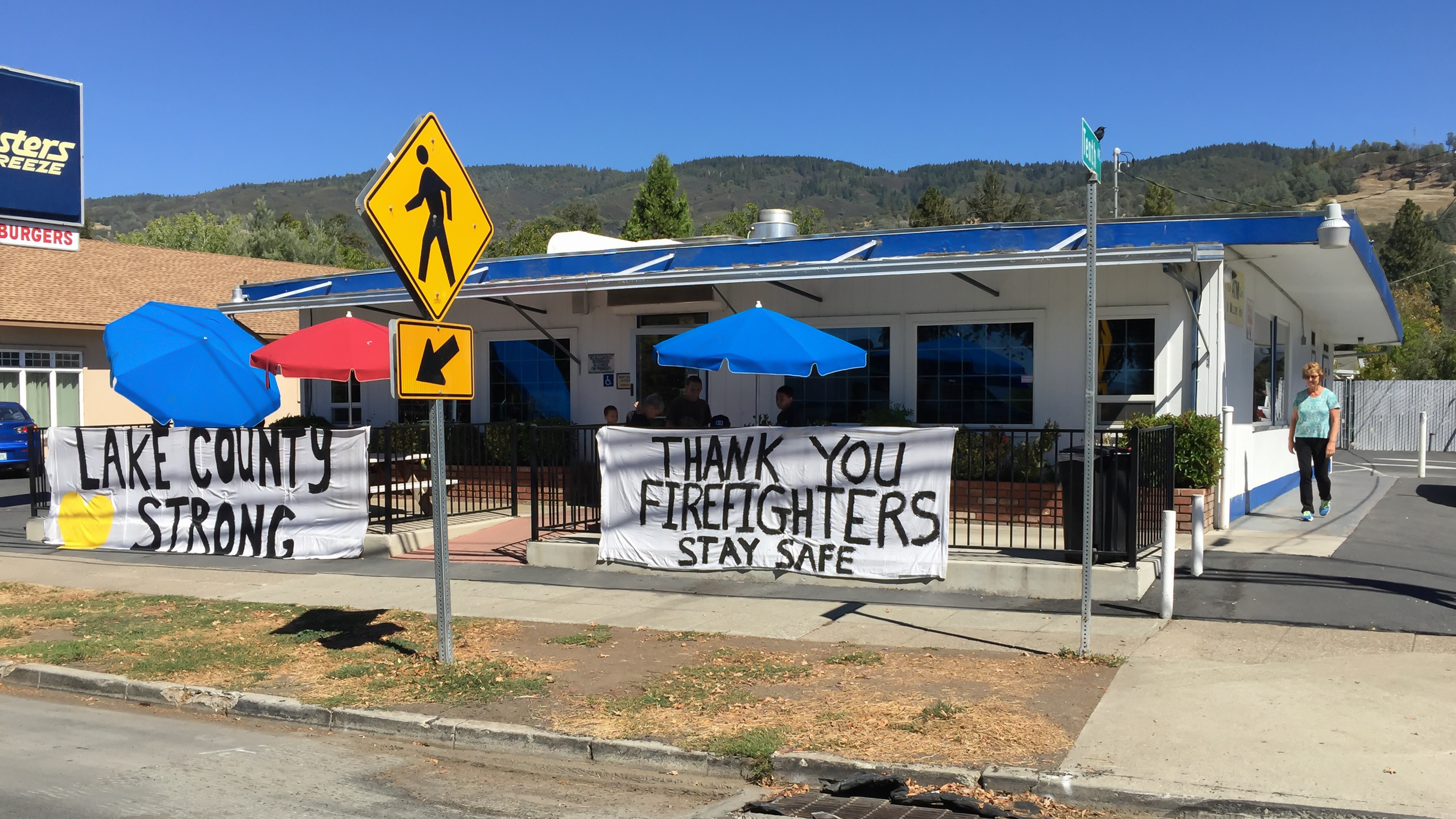
Public support for firefighters in Lucerne, Lake County

The Mendocino County Health and Human Services Agency, in coordination with the American Red Cross, opened a shelter on September 13 at the Redwood Empire Fairgrounds in Ukiah to offer medical and mental health assistance, and meals to evacuees. It closed on September 18.

Multiple people were arrested for looting or attempting to loot from evacuated or abandoned homes as a result of the fire. On September 14, a man posing as a California Highway Patrol officer was arrested in Whispering Pines on suspicion of removing an artifact of archaeological interest. On September 17, three people were arrested by Lake County Sheriff's Deputies for attempting to loot from homes in Hidden Valley Lake. They were allegedly in possession of burglary tools and an unregistered firearm.

On September 18, the California National Guard came to Lake County to assist the county's law enforcement with the task of protecting evacuated communities from looters and trespassers. About 50 National Guard military police teams were set to arrive on September 19.

In November 2015, a concert with country musicians Diamond Rio and Joe Diffie, and Ukiah country singer-songwriter McKenna Faith was held at the SOMO Village Event Center in Rohnert Park to raise money for Valley Fire victims.

A Cal Fire investigation pointed to faulty wiring of a hot tub installation as the cause of the fire.
