= Wine Country =

Area of Northern California known as a wine-growing region

- Wine region
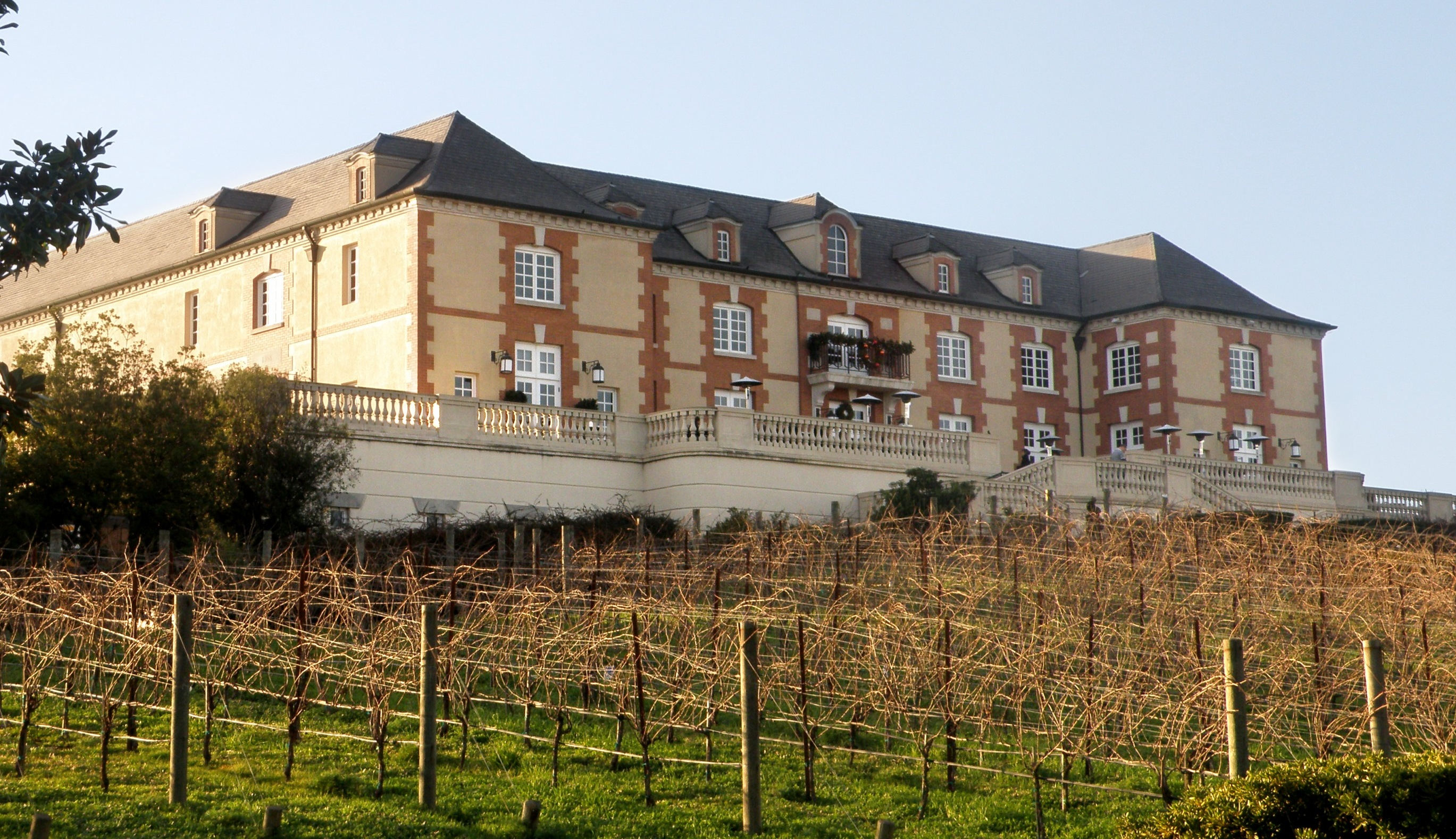
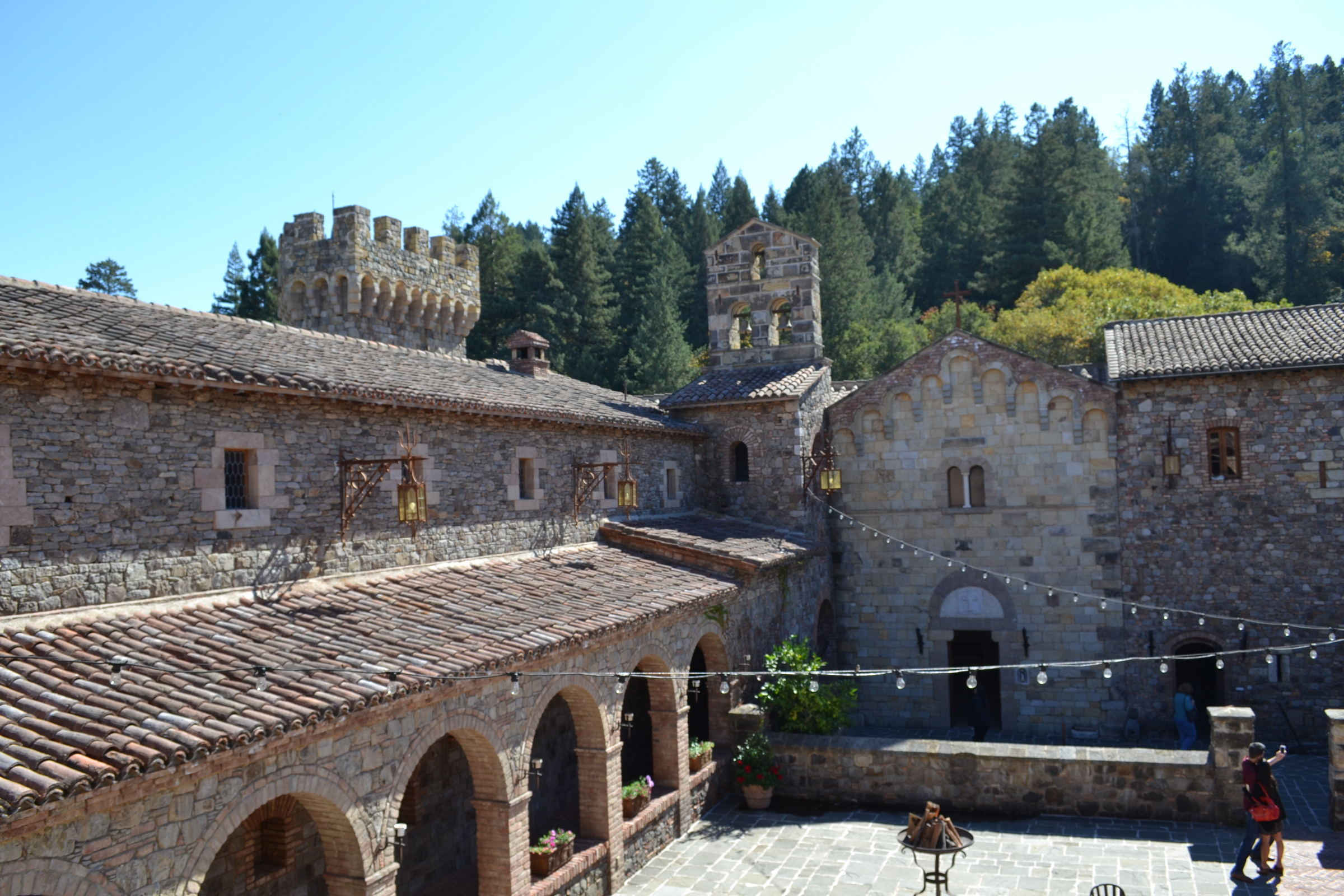
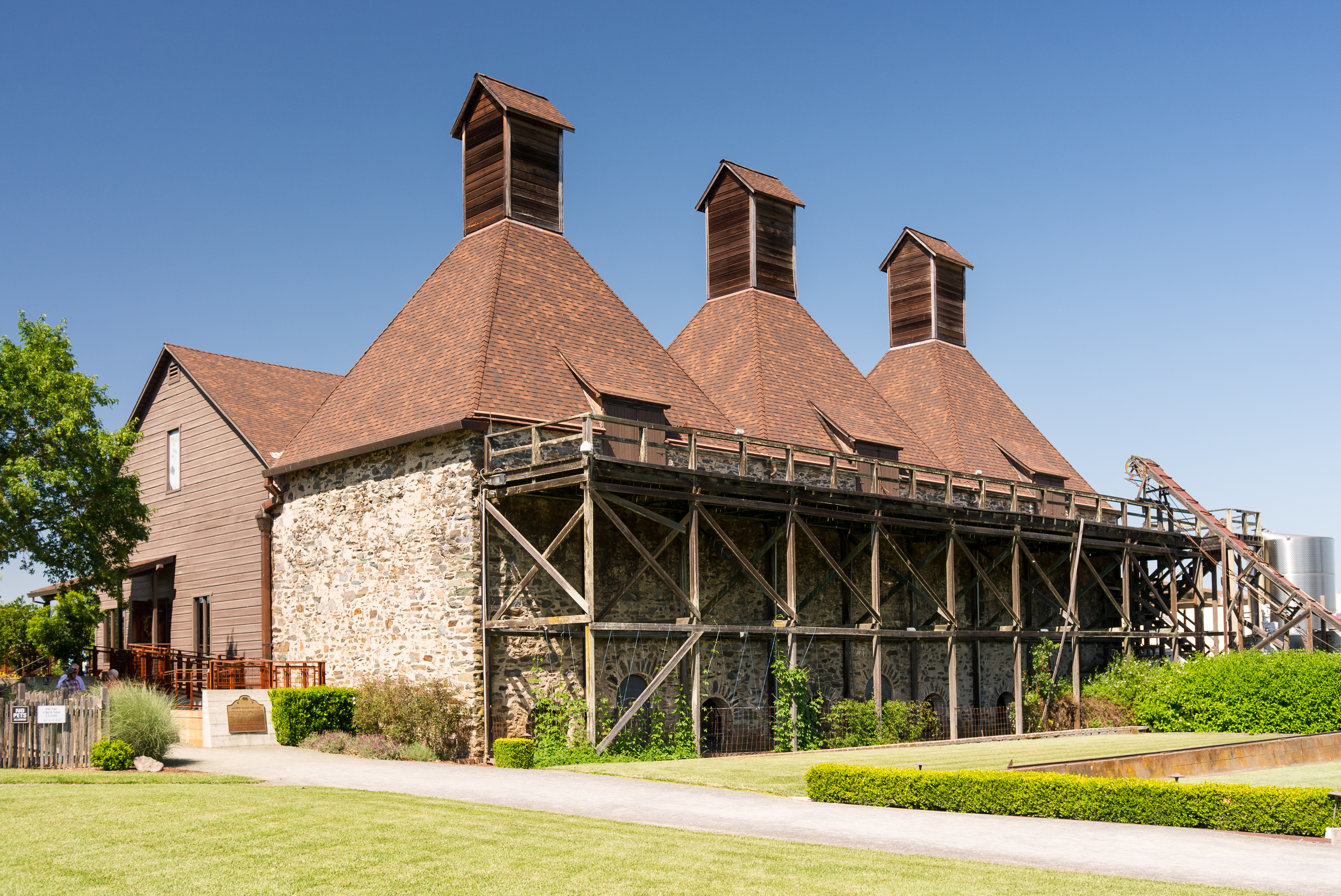
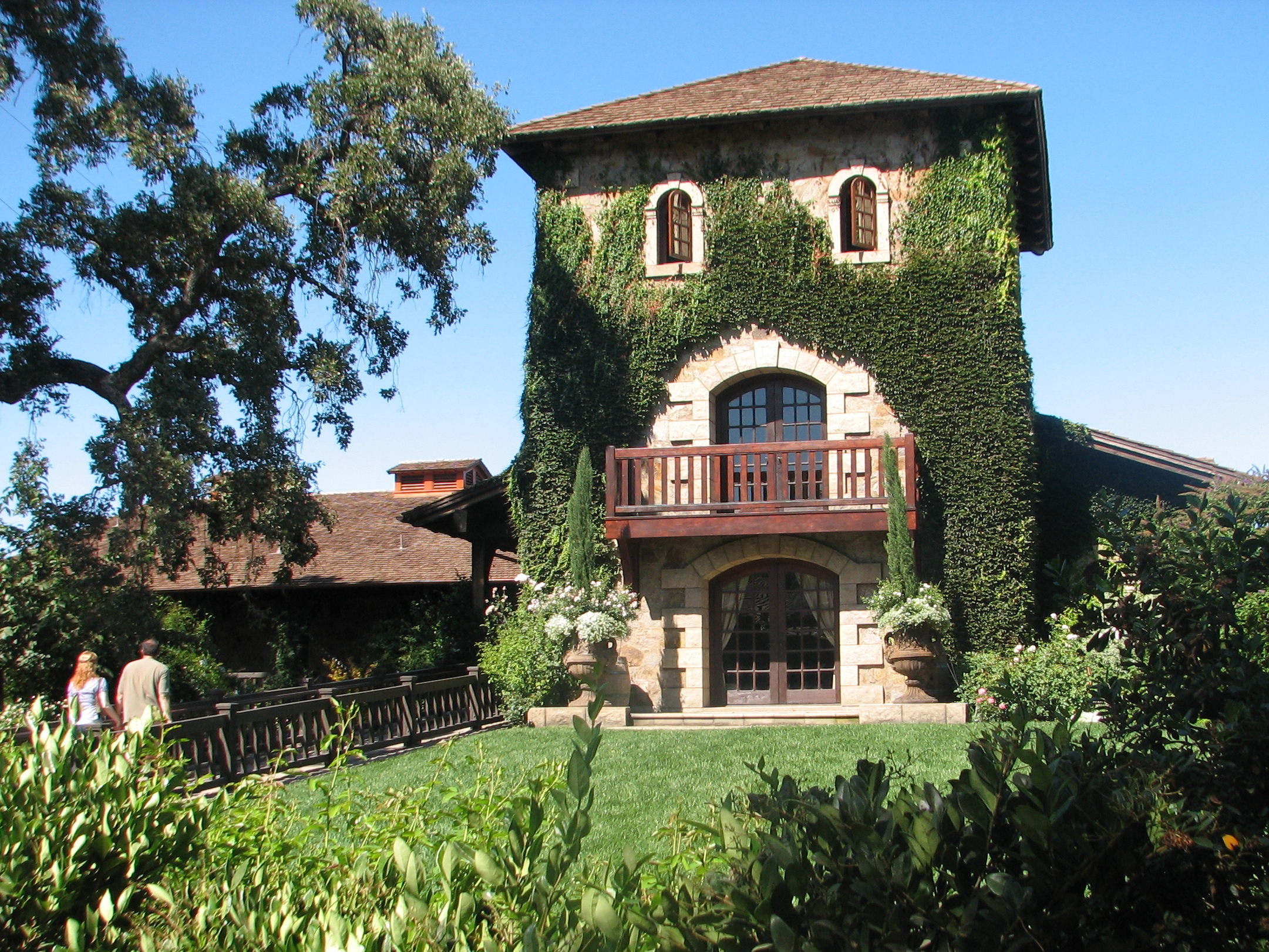
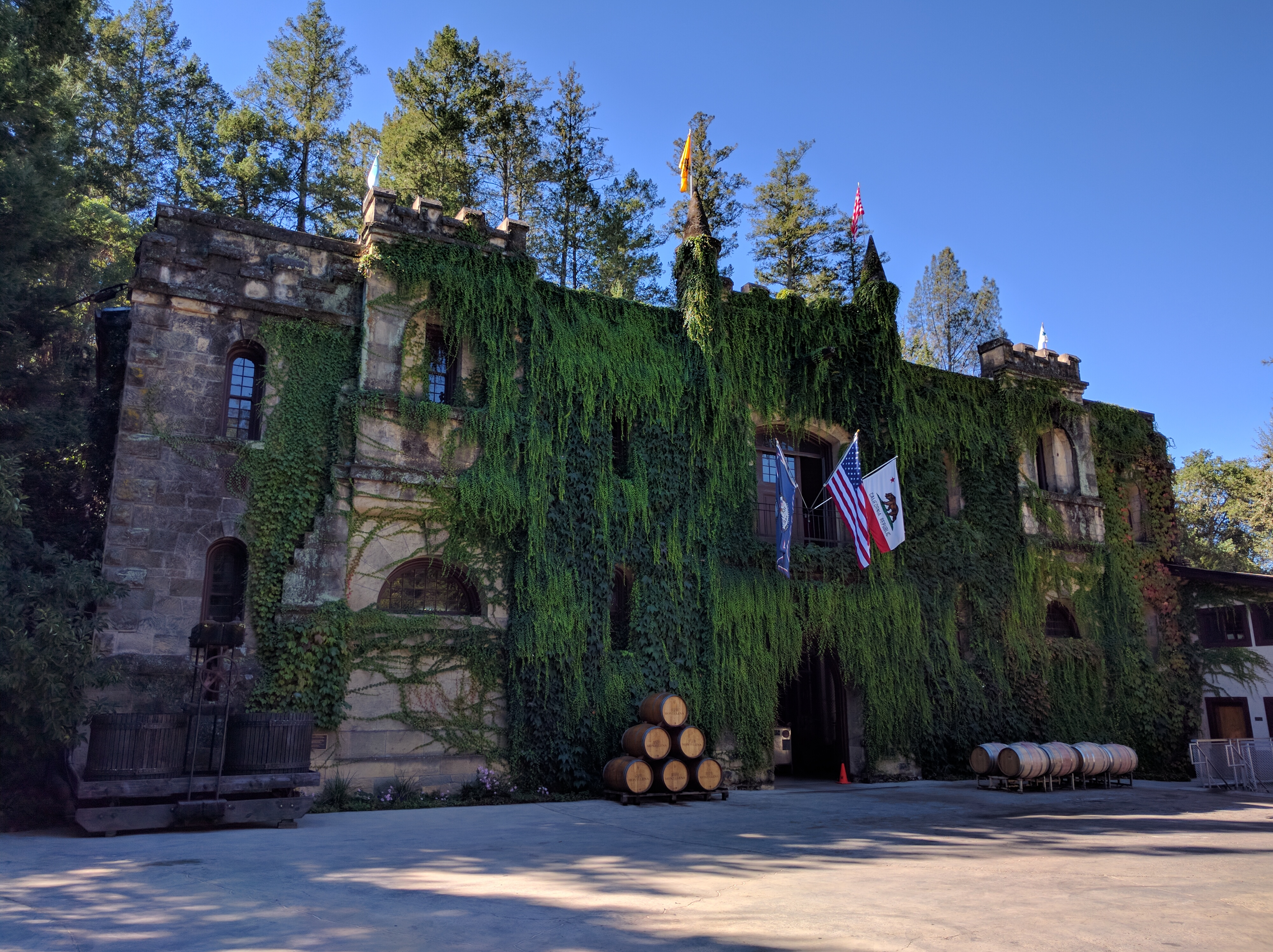
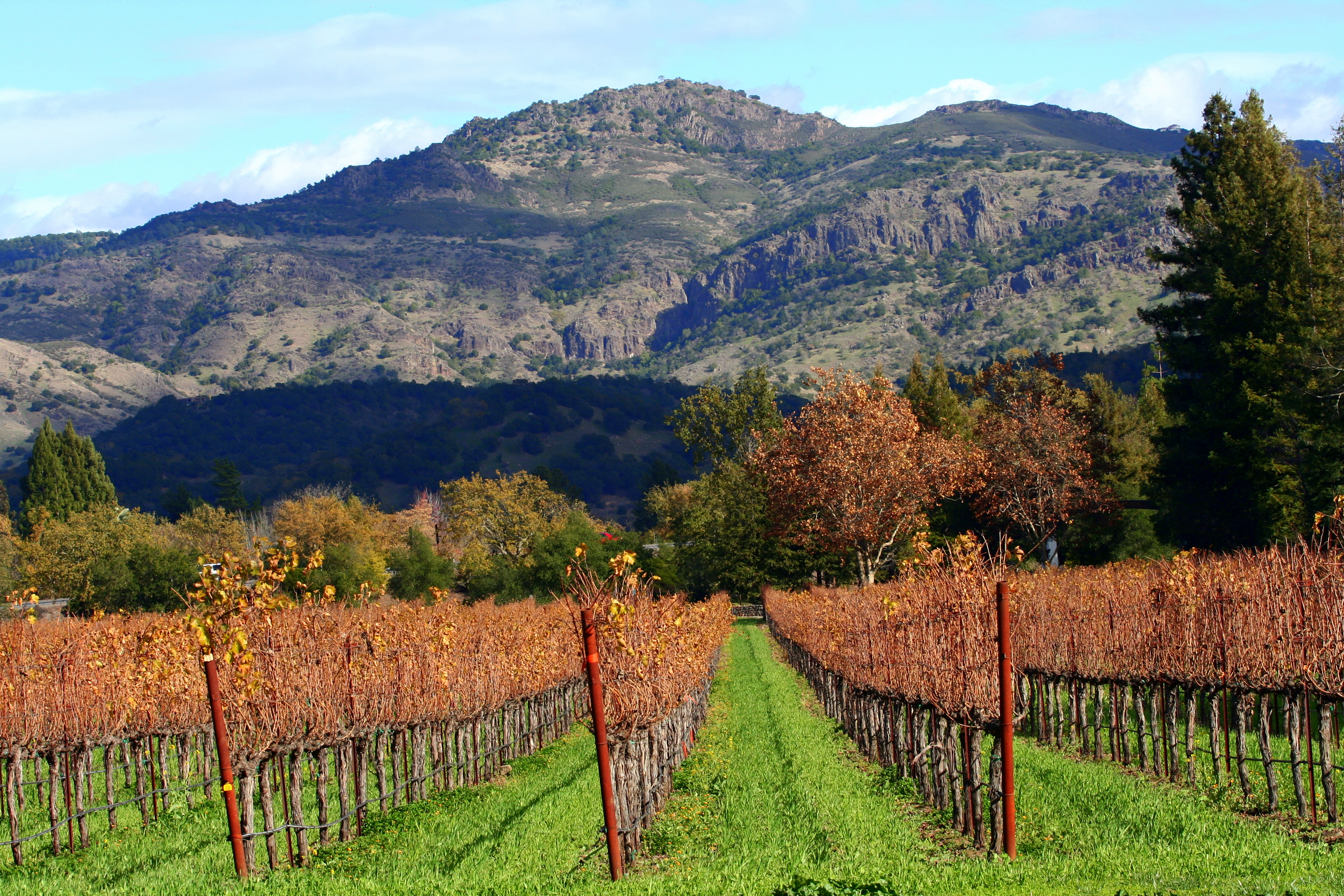
- Top to bottom to right: Domaine Carneros in Los Carneros AVA; Castello di Amorosa in Napa Valley AVA; the historic Walters Ranch Hop Kiln; V. Sattui Winery; Chateau Montelena in Calistoga AVA; Inglenook in Rutherford AVA; Napa Valley in autumn
- Year established: 1812
- Years of wine industry: 1812–present
- Country: United States
- Part of: California wine
- Sub-regions: Wine Country AVAs
- Climate region: Mediterranean

Wine Country is a region of California, in the northern San Francisco Bay Area, known worldwide as a premier wine-growing region. The region is famed for its wineries, its cuisine, Michelin star restaurants, boutique hotels, luxury resorts, historic architecture, and culture. Viticulture and wine-making have been practiced in the region since the Spanish missionaries from Mission San Francisco Solano established the first vineyards in 1812.

There are over 1,700 wineries in the North Bay, mostly located in the area's valleys, including Napa Valley in Napa County, and the Sonoma Valley, Alexander Valley, Dry Creek Valley, Bennett Valley, and Russian River Valley in Sonoma County. Wine grapes are also grown at higher elevations, such as Atlas Peak and Mount Veeder AVAs. Cities and towns associated with the Wine Country include Santa Rosa, Healdsburg, Sonoma, Kenwood, Petaluma, Sebastopol, Guerneville, Windsor, Geyserville, and Cloverdale in Sonoma County; Napa, Yountville, Rutherford, St. Helena and Calistoga in Napa County; and Hopland and Ukiah in Mendocino County. Wine is also an important part of the economy in nearby Lake, Solano, and Yolo counties.

== Appellations ==
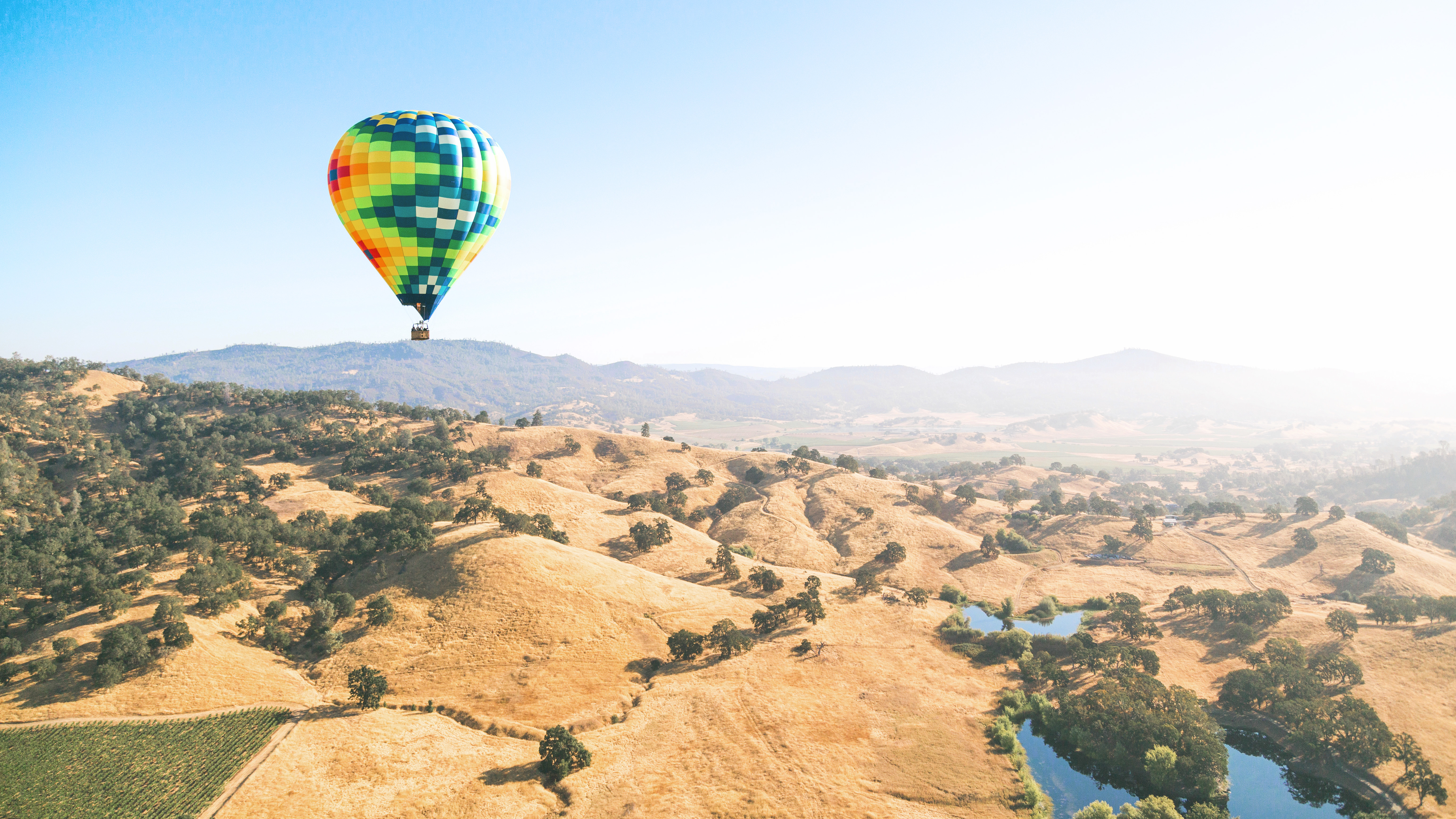
Hot air ballooning over Napa Valley

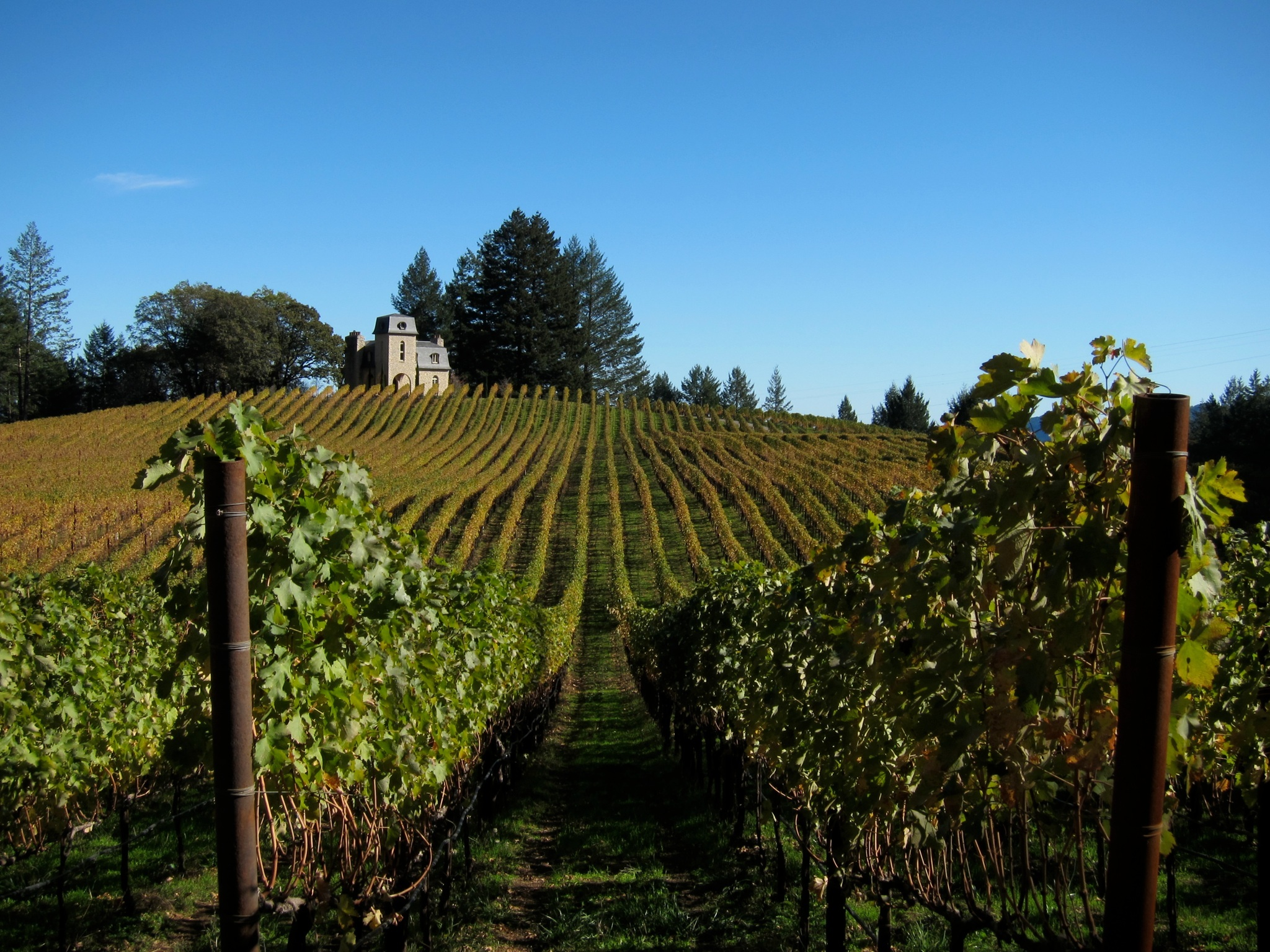
Chateau and vineyards in Napa

Wine Country is generally regarded as the combined counties of Napa, Sonoma, Mendocino, Lake, Solano, and western parts of Yolo County. These counties contain the following American Viticultural Areas (AVAs):

- in Sonoma County: Alexander Valley, Bennett Valley, Chalk Hill, Dry Creek Valley, Green Valley, Knight's Valley, Los Carneros, Northern Sonoma, Petaluma Gap, Pine Mountain-Cloverdale Peak, Rockpile, Russian River Valley, Sonoma Coast, Sonoma Mountain, Sonoma Valley and West Sonoma Coast.
- in Napa County: Atlas Peak, Chiles Valley, Crystal Springs, Diamond Mountain District, Howell Mountain, Oak Knoll District, Spring Mountain District, Wild Horse Valley, Los Carneros, Mount Veeder, Napa Valley, Oakville, Rutherford, Saint Helena, Calistoga, Stags Leap District and Yountville.
- in Mendocino County: Comptche, Eagle Peak , Anderson Valley, Cole Ranch, Covelo, Dos Rios, McDowell Valley, Redwood Valley, Yorkville Highlands, Mendocino, Mendocino Ridge and Potter Valley.
- in Lake County: Big Valley District, Clear Lake, Guenoc Valley, High Valley, Kelsey Bench, Long Valley, Red Hills, and Upper Lake Valley.
- in Solano County: Suisun Valley and Green Valley.

The six-county North Coast AVA overlaps with the Wine Country as defined here and also includes Marin County. In addition, the names of the counties themselves are legal for use as appellation names.

== History ==
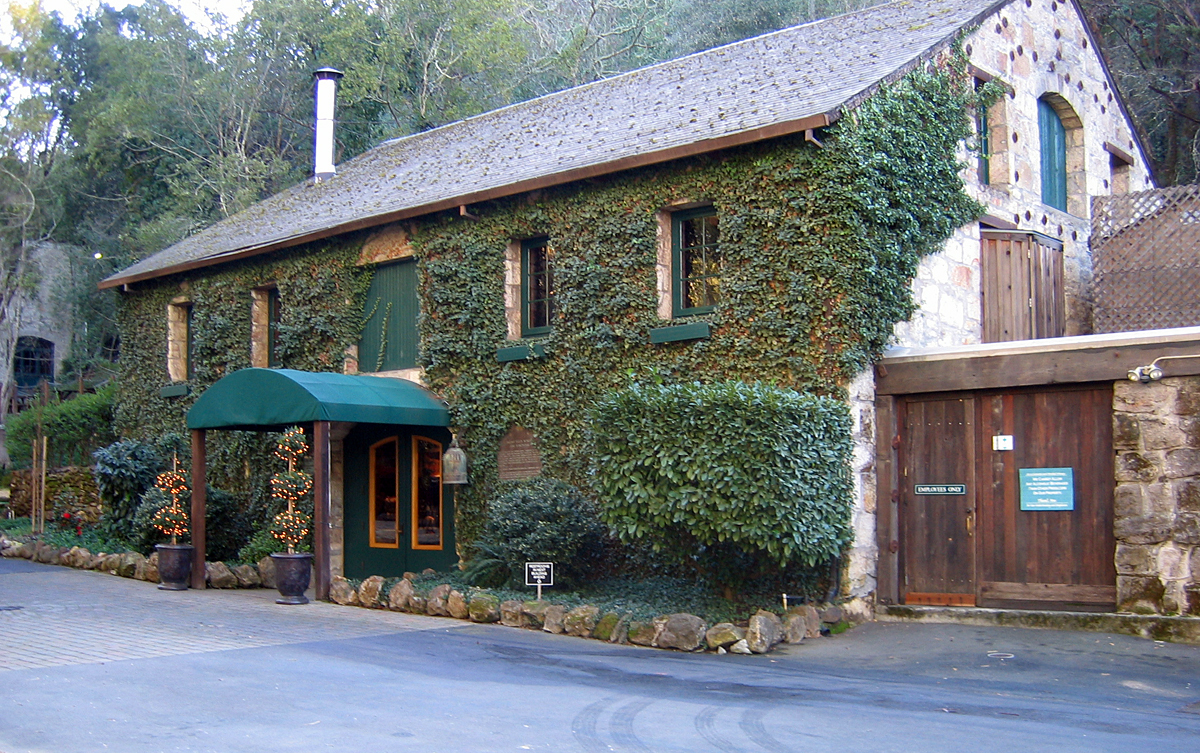
Buena Vista Winery, in Sonoma, is the oldest commercial winery in California, founded in 1857.

The earliest prehistory of the Wine Country involves habitation by several Native American tribes from approximately 8000 BC. The principal tribes living in this region included the Pomo, Coast Miwok, Wappo and Patwin, whose early peoples practiced certain forms of agriculture, but probably not involving the cultivation of grapes. During the Mexican Colonial period and after, European settlers brought in more intensive agriculture to the Wine Country, including growing grapes and wine production. Some of the historical events that led to the establishment of California as a state transpired in the Wine Country. In particular, the town of Sonoma is known as the birthplace of American California. Agoston Haraszthy is credited as one of the forefathers of the California wine industry in Sonoma by his planting of grapes in the lower Arroyo Seco Creek watershed of Sonoma County.

In 2017, many portions of California's Wine Country were heavily devastated by wildfires, including the October 2017 Northern California wildfires.

Founded in 1880, the UC Davis Department of Viticulture and Enology is the most famous and established school for research and education in winemaking in the Northern California region and the United States. It has contributed greatly to Northern California’s growth and establishment as a wine producing region.

== Ecology ==
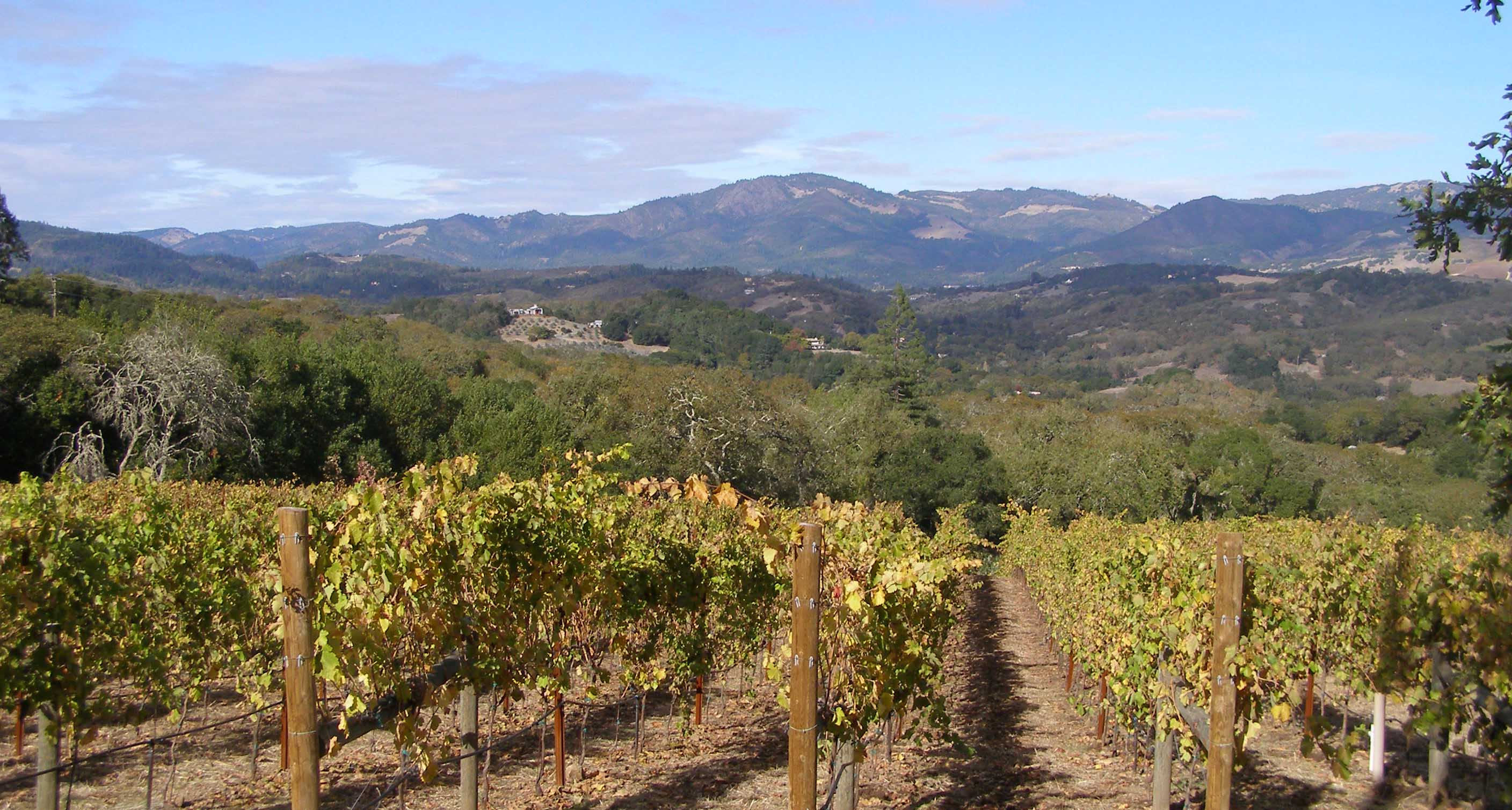
Sonoma Mountain AVA vineyard in front of the Mayacamas Mountains

A diversity of aquatic and terrestrial organisms populate the Wine Country and its riparian zones. Winter-run Chinook salmon (Oncorhynchus tsawytscha), Delta smelt (Hypomesus transpacificus) and steelhead (Oncorhynchus mykiss) are the most prominent fishes. Researchers have studied anadromous fish-movements extensively in Sonoma Creek and in the Napa River as well as in the Laguna de Santa Rosa - not only in the mainstems, but in many of the tributaries. These investigations have demonstrated a historical decline in spawning and habitat value for these species, primarily due to sedimentation and secondarily to removal of riparian vegetation since the 19th century.

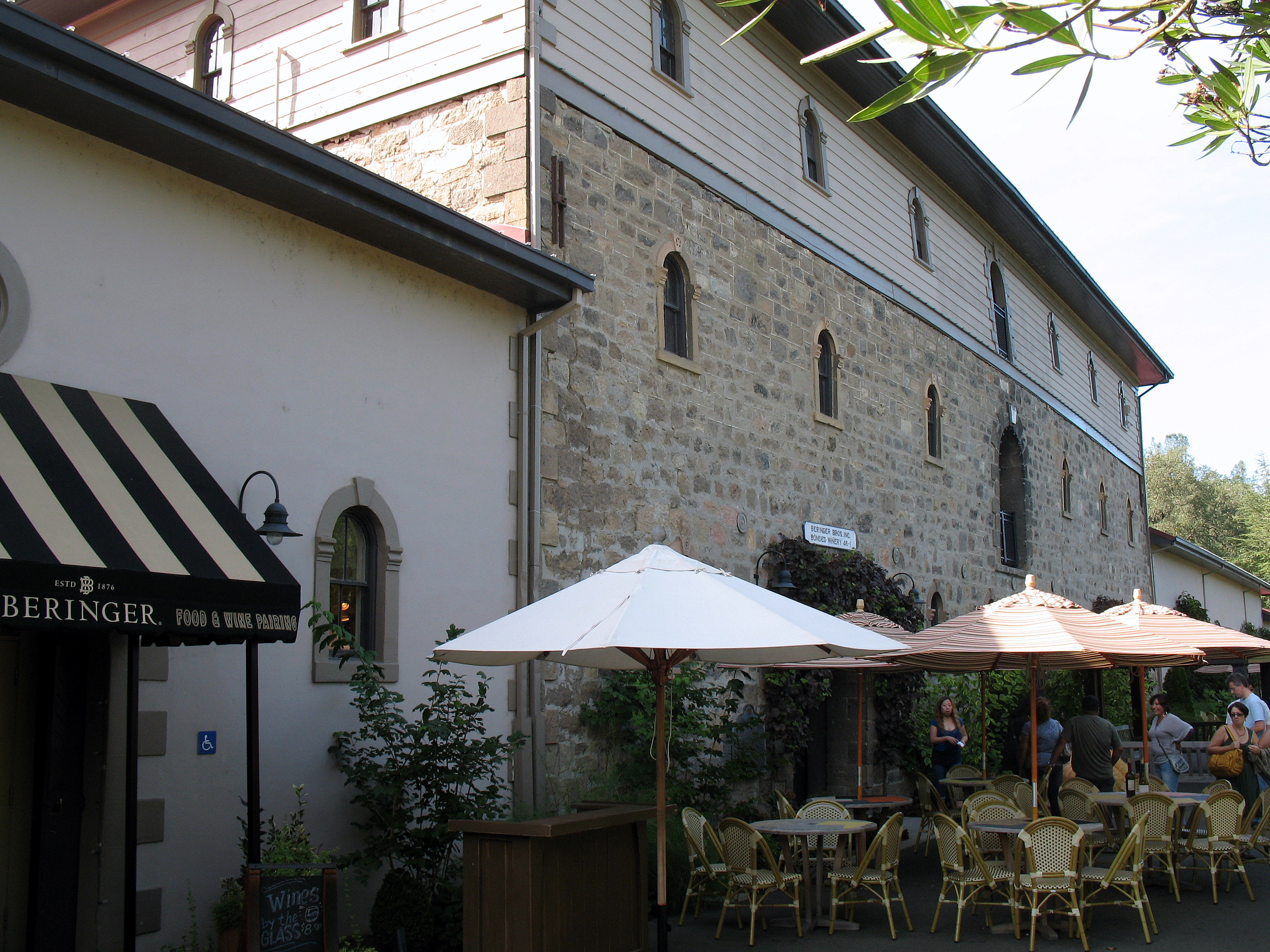
Beringer Vineyards is Napa Valley's oldest continuously operating winery.

A variety of salamanders, snakes and frogs are also present in the Wine Country. The federally listed as threatened California red-legged frog is present in the northern reach draining the south slopes of Annadel State Park. Several endangered species (mostly associated with the Napa Sonoma Marsh) present include Ridgway's rail (Rallus obsoletus), California black rail (Laterallus jamaicensis), California brown pelican (Pelicanus occudentalis), California freshwater shrimp (Syncaris pacifica), salt marsh harvest mouse (Reithrodontomys raviventris ), Suisun shrew (Sorex ornatus sinuosus), Sacramento splittail (Pogonichtys macrolepidotus). The above are endangered species with the exception of the splittail, steelhead and black rail, which are federally designated as threatened.

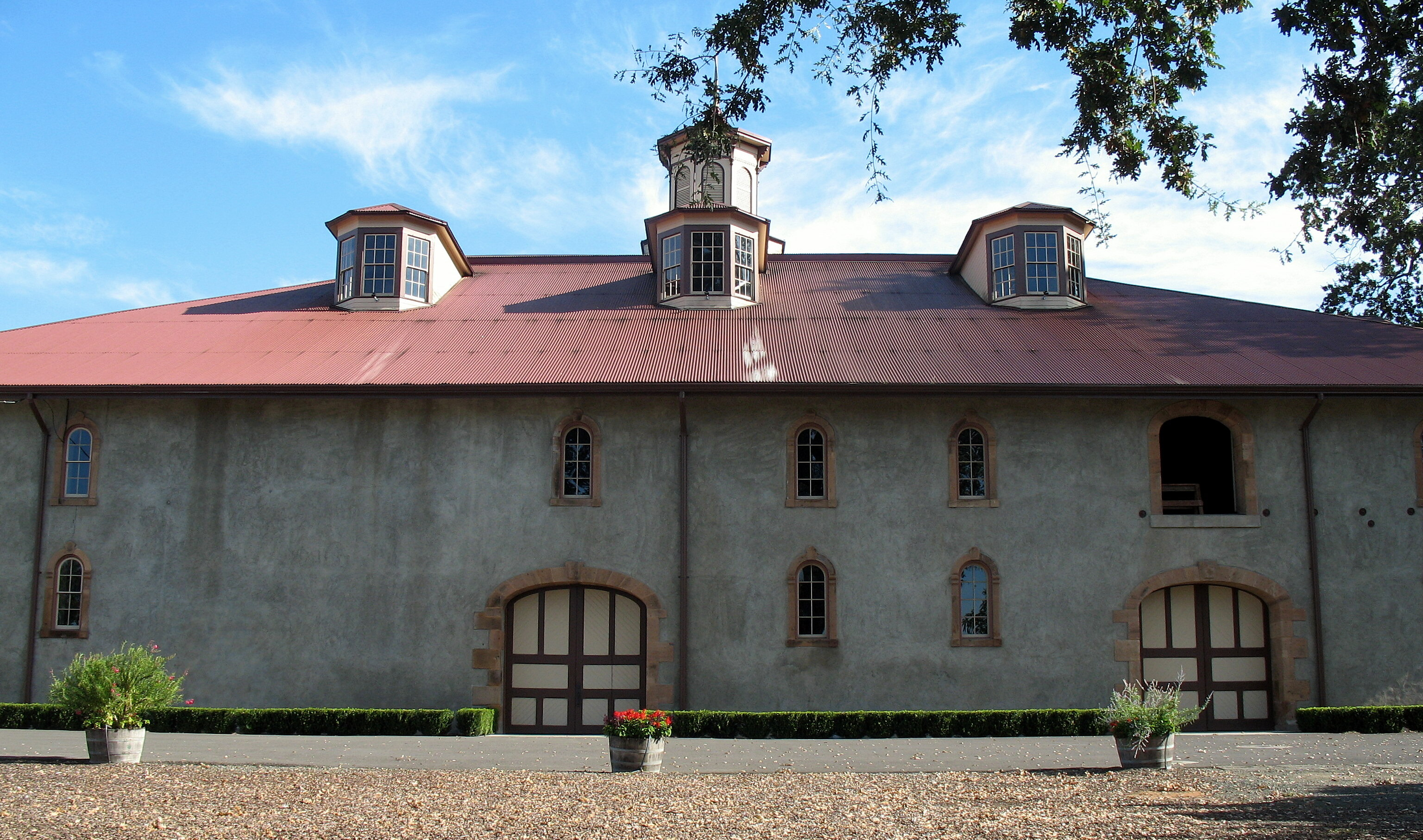
Charles Krug Winery, est. 1861, is a National Historic Landmark.

Upland ecosystems drained include mixed California oak woodland, chaparral and savannah woodland. In these upland reaches one finds plentiful black-tailed deer, coyote, skunk, raccoon, opossum, wild turkey, turkey vulture, red-tailed hawk and occasionally bobcat and mountain lion. Prominent higher elevation trees include: Coast live oak, Garry oak, Pacific madrone, California buckeye, Douglas fir, whereas valley oak is prevalent on the Wine Country valley floors.

== Tourism ==
The Wine Country has undergone a boom in tourism. In 1975 there were only 25 Napa Valley wineries; today there are well over 800 wineries in Napa and Sonoma Counties. Tourists come to the region not only for wine tasting, but also for hiking, bicycling, hot air ballooning, and historic sites, as well as the extensive culinary choices.

Numerous notable chefs and restaurateurs are present in the Wine Country, including Thomas Keller, John Ash, and Sondra Bernstein. Besides the obvious winery attractions, the Wine Country is known for the Sonoma County coastline along the Pacific Ocean, the Russian River valley, redwoods, hot spring baths, petrified forests and other natural areas.

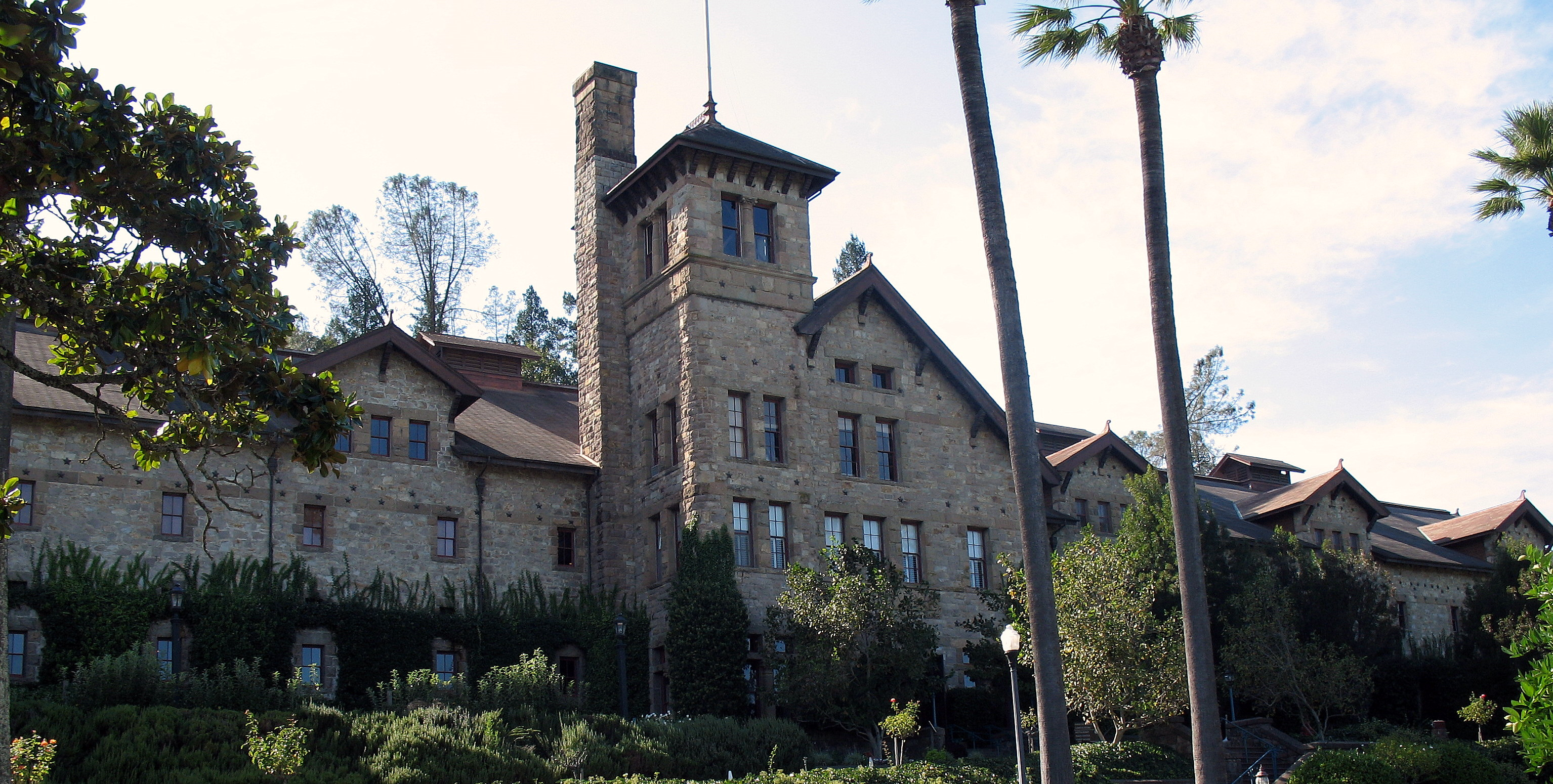
The Culinary Institute of America at Greystone is a prestigious Napa culinary school.

The Wine Country tourism boom has its downside, exemplified by traffic congestion on State Route 29, particularly on summer weekends, when the number of tourists often exceeds the carrying capacity of the road. The Napa Valley is also experiencing pressures for increased urbanization and roadway upgrades. There have also been issues related to regulating home sharing. After a boom in residents renting rooms in private homes, the city government of Napa was forced to require any Napa Airbnb properties to register.

== See also ==
- California wine
- Livermore Valley AVA
- Lake County wine
- Mendocino County wine
- Napa County wine
- Paso Robles AVA
- Santa Clara Valley AVA
- Sonoma County wine
- Temecula Valley AVA
