= Dry Creek Valley AVA =

American Viticultural Area in Sonoma County, California

Coordinates: 38°39′56″N 122°55′41″W

Dry Creek Valley
- Wine region
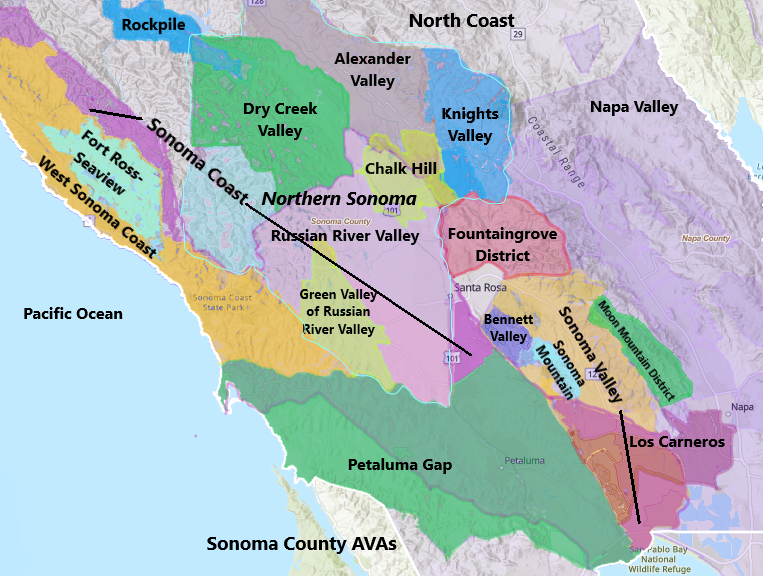
- Type: American Viticultural Area
- Year established: 1983; 2001 Amend
- Years of wine industry: 141
- Country: United States
- Part of: California, North Coast AVA, Sonoma County, Northern Sonoma AVA
- Other regions in California, North Coast AVA, Sonoma County, Northern Sonoma AVA: Alexander Valley AVA, Chalk Hill AVA, Green Valley of Russian River Valley AVA, Knights Valley AVA, Russian River Valley AVA, Sonoma Coast AVA
- Sub-regions: Rockpile AVA
- Growing season: 230–270 days
- Climate region: Region III
- Heat units: 3,001–3,500 GDD units
- Precipitation (annual average): valley: 25 to 50 in (640–1,270 mm) uplands: 30 to 70 in (760–1,780 mm)
- Soil conditions: alluvial loam in the valley and indurated rocky soil in the uplands
- Total area: 80,000 acres (125 sq mi); 2001: 79,590 acres (124 sq mi)
- Size of planted vineyards: 9,300 acres (3,800 ha)
- No. of vineyards: 90
- Grapes produced: Alicante Bouschet, Barbera, Black Malvasia, Cabernet Franc, Cabernet Sauvignon, Carignane, Chardonnay, Chasselas, Cinsault, Gewürztraminer, Grenache, Malbec, Marsanne, Merlot, Mourvèdre, Muscat Canelli, Muscat of Alexandria, Peloursin, Petit Verdot, Petite Sirah, Pinot blanc, Pinot noir, Riesling, Roussanne, Sangiovese, Sauvignon blanc, Sauvignon Musque, Sémillon, Syrah, Viognier, Zinfandel
- No. of wineries: 94

Dry Creek Valley is an American Viticultural Area (AVA) in north-central Sonoma County, California, located 70 miles (113 km) north of San Francisco, 20 miles (32 km) east of the Pacific Ocean and northwest of the town of Healdsburg. The wine appellation was established as the nation's 34^{th}, the state's 22^{nd} and the county's second AVA, on August 4, 1983 by the Bureau of Alcohol, Tobacco and Firearms (ATF), Treasury after reviewing the petition submitted on behalf of the Dry Creek Valley Association, Inc., a local natural resource group, proposing a viticultural area named "Dry Creek Valley."

The name is taken from Dry Creek, a tributary of the Russian River, the primary waterway in the area. The inverted "U"-shaped valley extends southeasterly just east of the Warm Springs Creek/Dry Creek confluence south of Healdsburg and is approximately 16 miles (25.7 km) long by two miles (3.2 km) wide. Historically, the valley traversed by Dry Creek and the surrounding upland area have been referred to by the name Dry Creek Valley. This is substantiated by excerpts of articles from local and national publications written by 19th century and contemporary authors. After evaluating the evidence, ATF determined "Dry Creek Valley" is the most appropriate name for the viticultural area. Approximately 20,500 acres (32 sq mi) of the appellation's 80,000 acres (125 sq mi) encompasses the valley landform. The remaining acreage defines the uplands immediately surrounding and to the west of the valley. About 9,300 acres (3,764 ha) of cultivated vineyards are spread throughout the area benefiting from their proximity to the Lake Sonoma reservoir for irrigation in this relatively dry area.

== History ==
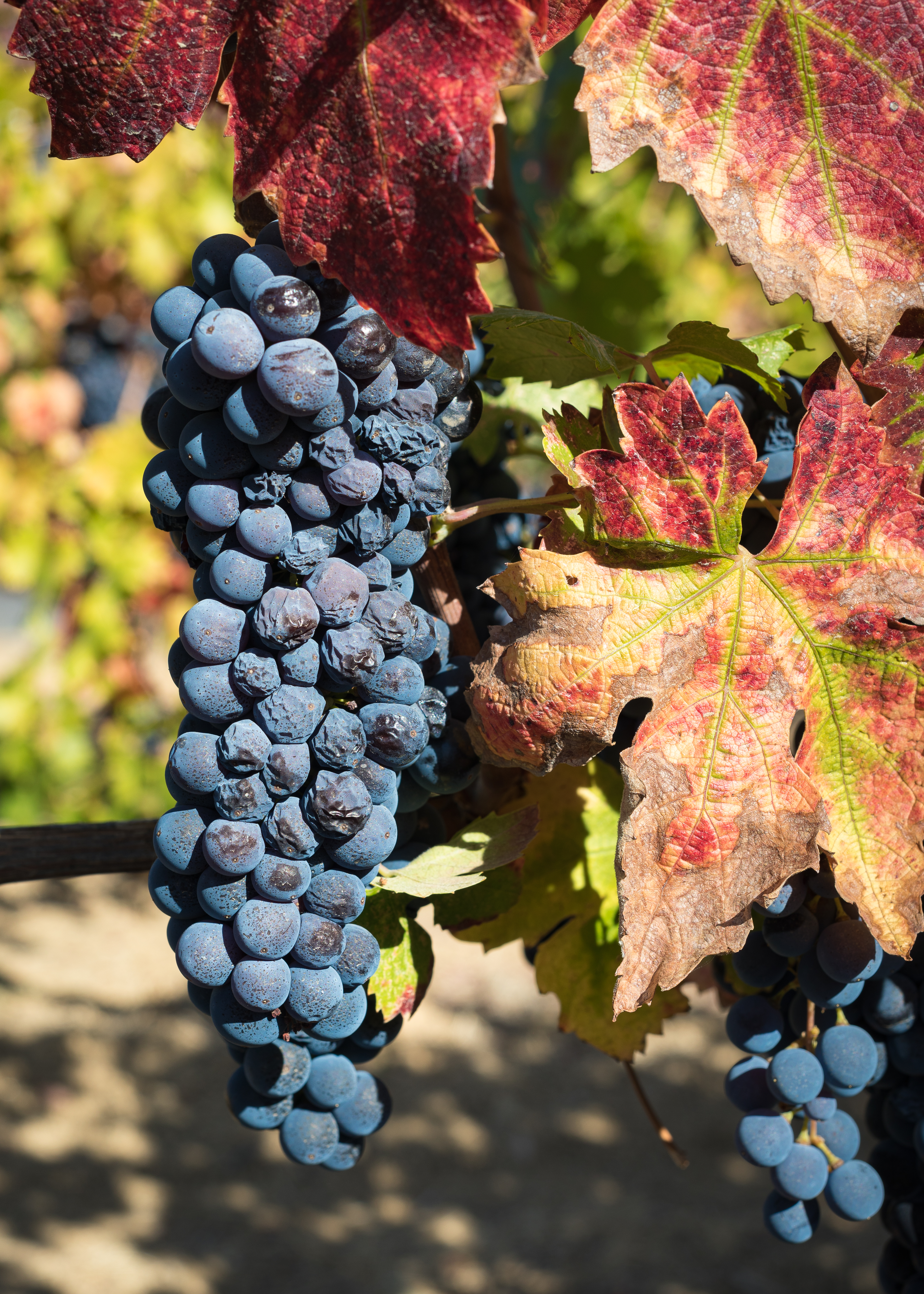
Dry Creek Valley Zinfandel grapes

Grapes, primarily of the Zinfandel variety, have been grown in the valley area since the beginning in the 1800s. Among the original settlers was Svente Parker Hallengren, a Swedish immigrant who planted vineyards in the fertile soil of the valley in 1868 and shipped wine back to Sweden. At the turn of the 20th century, Dry Creek Valley was one of California's most prominent producers of Zinfandel with nine wineries and 883 acres (357 ha) of vineyards contributing to the state's wine boom. However, Prohibition caused most of the valley to convert to plum, pear, and prune trees, with much of the fruit processed by Sunsweet Growers in Healdsburg. Since the resurgence of wine grape production in the 1970s, Cabernet Sauvignon and Zinfandel have become the most planted varieties, and Dry Creek Valley, again, one of the state's top Zinfandel producers. Blocks of old-vine Zinfandel, having survived Prohibition, are distinctive with stout vines standing alone with no trellis, their gnarled arms seeming to flail in all directions. Sauvignon Blanc has become the most important white grape varietal produced in the valley.

== Terroir ==
=== Topography ===
The viticultural area is distinguishable from surrounding areas on the basis of geographical features. It is generally wetter, warmer, and has a longer growing season than the main Russian River Valley to the south. As a result of the moderating effect of fog on temperature, it is generally cooler than the area to the north. The valley area encompassed is distinguished on three sides by contact between the geologically younger alluvial material of the valley with the older indurated rock of the surrounding uplands. The uplands to the west of the valley extend to the watershed limits of the Dry Creek drainage area. Although the adjacent Alexander Valley to the east is viticulturally similar to Dry Creek Valley, these valleys are separated by uplands. The uplands are composed of a geologically unique, gravelly material known as Dry Creek Conglomerate which is found no where else in Sonoma County. After evaluating the evidence, ATF believed the above discussed geographical features, singly and in combination, serve to distinguish the Dry Creek Valley viticultural area from surrounding areas.
The geomorphological characteristics of the viticultural area generally correspond to distinguishable geological features which define a valley and an upland area. The valley area is delineated on three sides by contact between geologically younger alluvial material with older indurated rock. These geological boundaries are generally continuous. The valley area merges with the main Russian River Valley area near Healdsburg. The alluvial material in the valley is composed of interbedded clay, sand and silt under the central floor; poorly stratified clay, silt and gravel near the edges which has formed alluvial fans; and poorly sorted clay, sand and gravel adjacent to and slightly above modem stream courses. The upland areas are generally underlaid with indurated bedrock. This bedrock, sheared and ground by faulting action, is part of the "Franciscan Formation" composed of graywacke, sandstone, chert, greenstone, pillow lava, shale, and serpentine. However, the upland area separating the valley area from the Alexander Valley area is composed of "Dry Creek Conglomerate." The viticultural area is served by Dry Creek, a major Russian River tributary. The boundaries correspond with the boundaries of the Dry Creek watershed. As a result, all of the valley area drained by Dry Creek and the upland area drained by Dry Creek tributaries are encompassed.

=== Climate ===
The viticultural area possesses two distinct climatic conditions. The valley area has an annual rainfall of 25 to 50 inches (635–1,270 mm), temperatures of 58–60 °F (14–16 °C), and a frost-free season of 240–270 days. The upland area has an annual rainfall of 30 to 70 inches (762–1,778 mm), temperatures of 54–58 °F (12–14 °C) and a frost-free season of 230–270 days. The main Russian River Valley area to the south has an annual rainfall of 25 to 40 inches (635–1,016 mm), 54–68 °F (12–20 °C) and frost-free season of 240–260 days. The viticultural area is generally wetter, warmer, and has a longer growing season than the main Russian River Valley area. The petitioner submitted a temperature comparison study, prepared by the Cooperative Extension, University of California, Sonoma County. It indicates the valley area is warmer than the main Russian River Valley area and cooler than the area to the north as a result of the moderating effect of fog on temperature. The study indicates the breakpoint in Sonoma County for intrusion of fog of sufficient intensity to significantly affect temperatures is generally the area in the vicinity of Healdsburg including the southern portion of the viticultural area. In addition, under the climatic region concept developed by Amerine and Winkler, the viticultural area is generally classified as Region 3 and the main Russian River Valley area is generally classified as Region 2. That is, the sum of the mean daily temperature above 50 °F (10 °C), expressed in temperature-time values of degree days, for each day in the period April–October of any given year is generally 3,001-3,500 for the viticultural area and 2,501-3,000 for the main Russian River Valley area. To summarize, the petitioner contends the viticultural area possesses a unique set of growing conditions which distinguish it from the surrounding area. In addition, the petitioner claims these conditions have a marked influence on the amount and distribution of heat and moisture received by grapes during the growing season. This, in turn, directly affects the development and balance of sugar, acid, and other constituents of grapes grown in the viticultural area. The USDA plant hardiness zone range from 9a to 9b.

=== Soils ===
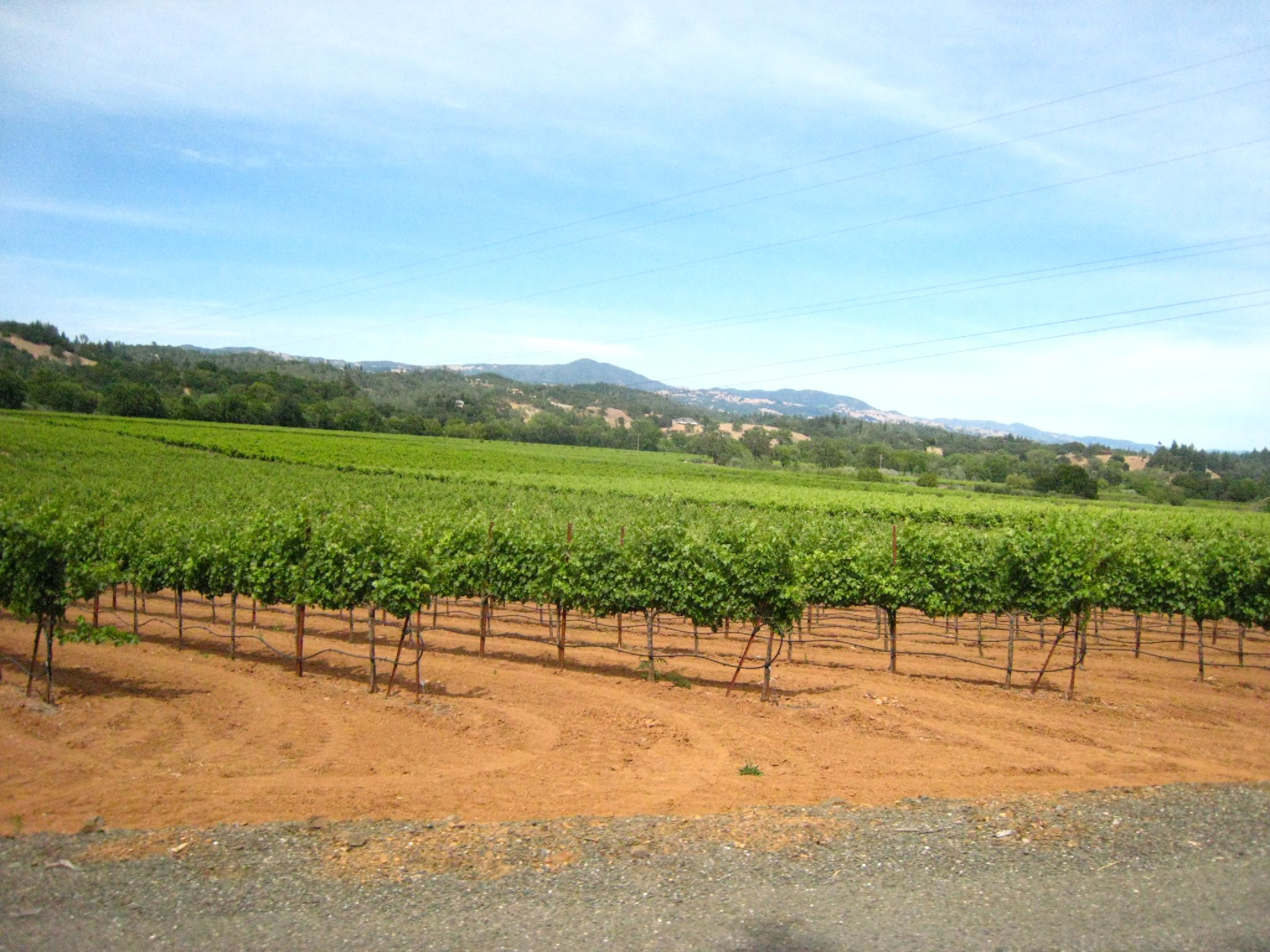
Dry Creek Valley vineyards

The soils found in the valley area are distinct from the soils found on the surrounding uplands. This is due to the different parent material, i.e., alluvial in the valley and indurated rock in the uplands, from which the soils were formed. The soils found throughout the valley area are primarily of the Yolo-Cortina-Pleasanton association. The soils in the upland areas are of the Hugo-Josephine-Laughlin association west and north of the valley, Spreckels-Felta association southeast of the valley, and Los Gatos-Henneke-Maymen association northeast of the valley. The contrast in soils allows an easy distinction between the valley and upland areas. In addition, the upland soils generally distinguish the valley area from adjacent viticultural areas.

The source of soils found in Dry Creek Valley originate in the three geologic rock types: Igneous; Metamorphic; and Sedimentary. Boomer soils, for example, are formed from old and weathered Basaltic Green stone Igneous rocks, formed in place from underlying parent material. The Manzanita and Yolo soils are a combination of all three geologic rock types. Also considered a source of soil building and replenishment is the subterranean action of several faults found in this area, viz., the Healdsburg, Grass Valley, and Mill Creek fault zones.
Soils can be grouped into three main categories: (1) The Valley Floor and Flood Plain Adjacent to the Major Streams; (2) Valley Margins, Alluvial Fans, Level Bench Terraces, and Low Hill Elevations Above the Valley Margins; (3) Hills (i.e., high), Mountains and Faults, which in ages past have contributed to the creation of the fertile soils of the valleys, fans, terraces, and some of the low hills. There are at least twenty-nine soil types in the Dry Creek Valley watershed. Of these, we can single out the following as constituting the major types and having the most significance as regards viticulture: Dry Creek Valley Floor: the various Yolo soils, regarded as the most productive, having the most desirable texture and permeability, and hence the most fertile. They are widespread throughout the Valley floor. In the Valley Margins, Fans, Terraces, and Low Hills: Manzanita; Haire; and Boomer. These soils are widespread also, and are associated with quality grape production, not only because of inherent fertility, but because of the varying degrees of rocky material comprising their textures which results in excellent permeability and drainage. The mean annual rainfall in the Healdsburg-Dry Creek Valley area is around 40 inches (1,016 mm), and the mean annual run-off is between 16–18 inches (406–457 mm). This suggests that approximately half of the rainfall is penetrating the soil, thereby indicating excellent permeability.

== Wineries ==
Over 94 wineries are resident in Dry Creek Valley and over 160 produce wines labeled with the Dry Creek Valley appellation. Dry Creek Valley is home to the majority of E & J Gallo Winery Sonoma County vineyards who established facilities in the valley since the early 1990s. The trade association, Winegrowers of Dry Creek Valley, organized in 1989, represent most of Dry Creek AVA's growers and producers. Several wineries can be traced back to immigrant families that founded the valley's wine industry such as Pedrocelli Winery and Seghesio Family Vineyards; the Mauritson family descending from S. P. Hallengren; and A. Rafanelli Winery established in 1952. Among wineries founded after Prohibition, Dry Creek Vineyard (1972) was the first followed by Preston Farm and Winery (1975) and Quivira Vineyards (1981). An example of the valley's field-blend style can be seen on Ridge Vineyards, where some vines date back to 1901.

== See also ==
- Sonoma County wine
- Wine Country (California)
