= Modini Mayacamas Preserves =

The Modini Mayacamas Preserves are located in the Mayacamas Mountains, east of Healdsburg, California. The Preserves are roughly split by Pine Flat road and are east of Alexander Valley and northwest of Knights Valley. The current stewards of the property are Audubon Canyon Ranch, a private preservation organization involved in nature education, conservation science, and land stewardship. They own over 5,000 acres of property in Marin, Lake, and Sonoma Counties.

The total acreage of Modini Mayacamas Preserves is approximately 3,000 acres. Pine Flat road is a public county road and popular cycling route. The two properties consist of the Modini Ingalls Ecological Preserve (MIEP) and the Mayacamas Mountains Sanctuary (MMS). Pull outs along Pine Flat road are favored by birders. MIEP is closed to public access and is exclusively used as a scientific research preserve. ACR provides independent hiking access to the MMS by attending an orientation.

Theresa A. and John C. Ingalls homesteaded in 1867 on a portion of what is currently the MIEP. By 1898, the Ingalls owned around 780 acres. Jim and Shirley Modini inherited the property from the Ingalls and were cattle ranchers for the majority of their lives on the ranch. They ranched from the end of World War II to their deaths in 2011 and 2012.
