= Knights Valley AVA =

American Viticultural Area in Sonoma County, California

Coordinates: 38°38′40″N 122°42′14″W

Knights Valley
- Wine region
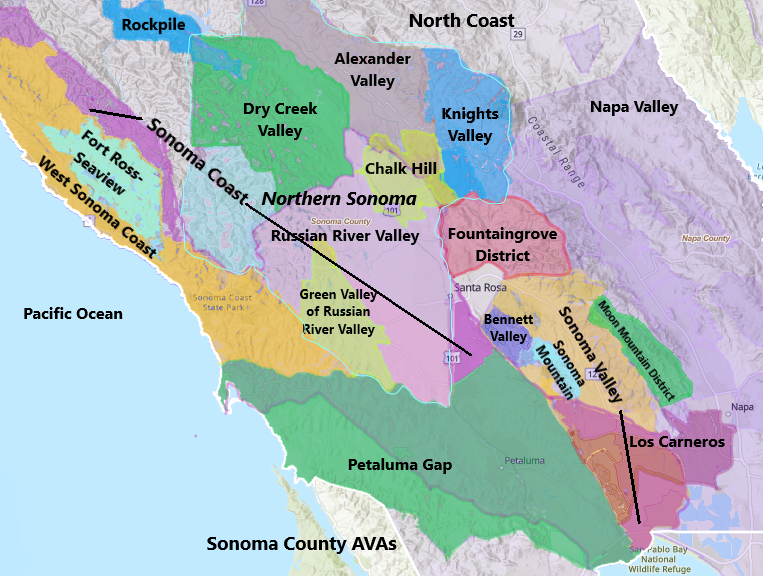
- Type: American Viticultural Area
- Year established: 1983
- Years of wine industry: 152
- Country: United States
- Part of: California, North Coast AVA, Sonoma County, Northern Sonoma AVA
- Other regions in California, North Coast AVA, Sonoma County, Northern Sonoma AVA: Alexander Valley AVA, Chalk Hill AVA, Dry Creek Valley AVA, Green Valley of Russian River Valley AVA, Russian River Valley AVA, Sonoma Coast AVA
- Growing season: 220–270 days
- Climate region: Region III
- Heat units: 3,001–3,500 GDD
- Precipitation (annual average): 44 inches (1,100 mm)
- Soil conditions: alluvial loam in the valley and indurated rocky soil in the uplands
- Total area: 36,240 acres (57 sq mi)
- Size of planted vineyards: 2,000 acres (810 ha)
- No. of vineyards: 4
- Grapes produced: Cabernet Franc, Cabernet Sauvignon, Chardonnay, Gamay Noir, Malbec, Merlot, Mourvedre/Mataro, Petit Verdot, Sangiovese, Sauvignon Blanc, Semillon, Syrah/Shiraz, Tinta Cao, Viognier, Zinfandel
- No. of wineries: 9

Knights Valley is an American Viticultural Area (AVA) located in Sonoma County, California encompassing an approximate 5.3 miles (8.5 km) long by 1.8 miles (2.9 km) wide valley landform named Knights Valley.

== Establishment ==
As one of the Sonoma's five original viticultural areas, Knights Valley was established as the nation's 51st, the state's 33rd and the county's fifth appellation on October 21, 1983, by the Bureau of Alcohol, Tobacco and Firearms (ATF), Treasury after reviewing the petition submitted by The Knights Valley Wine-Growers Committee, an organization of grape/wine industry members and signed by 16 persons, proposing a viticultural area in northeastern Sonoma County named "Knights Valley."

== Location ==
The area encompasses approximately 36,240 acres (57 sq mi) with over 30 growers cultivating 2,000 acres (809 ha) under vine. In the easternmost Sonoma County region, Knights Valley has the warmest climate in the county. Its northernmost boundary line runs slightly to the north of Pine Mountain; the southernmost boundary line borders the petrified forest area immediately to the north of Porter Creek. The Sonoma County line bordering Lake County and Napa County outlines the eastern section of the viticultural area. The western section is adjacent to the boundaries of Alexander Valley and Chalk Hill viticultural areas. The plant hardiness zone ranges from 9a to 10a.

== History ==
In 1843, a 17,742-acre (28 sq mi) Mexican land grant was given to José de los Santos Berreyesa as a reward from Governor Manuel Micheltorena for his years of distinguished military service at the Presidio of Sonoma from 1840 to 1842. Known as Rancho Mallacomes, Mallacomes Valley and Agua Caliente (presently Calistoga) were within this grant. The valley became Berreyesa's private hunting preserve where he built an adobe hunting lodge that survives. Berreyesa married Francisca Ignacis Martínez (1824–1907), a twin daughter of Ygnacio Martínez. The couple had four sons and two daughters between 1848 and 1856. In 1850, after the Mexican–American War, statehood came to California. Berreyesa remained in California until his death in Martinez, California on October 30, 1864.
Thomas B. Knight, a native of Maine and participant in the 1846 Bear Flag Revolt at Sonoma bought a large portion of Rancho Mallacomes from Berryessa and his title to the land was confirmed in 1853. He named it Rancho Muristood, added a second story to the lodge and planted vineyards, peaches, apples and wheat. Mallocomes Valley would later be renamed "Knights Valley." It's documented that Knight grew 17 acres (6.9 ha) of wine grapes, thought to have been planted in 1874, and shipped to wineries in Napa Valley.

== Terroir ==
=== Topography ===
The viticultural area ranges in elevation from 360 feet (110 m) to slightly over 4,300 feet (1,311 m). The valley area encompasses ranges in elevation from 360 to 600 feet (110–183 m). The upland areas contain fairly rugged peaks that are over 3,500 feet (1,067 m) in elevation, e.g., Pine Mountain--3,614 feet (1,102 m), Red Hill--3,527 feet (1,075 m), and Mount Saint Helena--4,343 feet (1,324 m). The areas currently used for grape production are consistently higher in elevation than the grape-growing areas in the adjacent Alexander Valley, Chalk Hill, Russian River Valley, and Napa Valley areas. The differences in elevation between this area and the surrounding areas became significantly evident when the many hill "islands" and peninsulas in the upper elevations capable of quality grape production were fully developed into producing vineyards.

=== Climate ===
The climate in the viticultural area is typically Mediterranean, i.e., characterized by warm, dry summers and mild, cool, moist winters moderated by its proximity to the Pacific Ocean, isolation from large valleys and low mountain elevation. The valley area has an average annual rainfall of 44 inches (1,100 mm), temperature of 58–60 °F (14–16 °C), and a frost-free season of 220–270 days. The upland areas are generally wetter, cooler, and have shorter frost-free season than the valley area. Rainfall in the valley area is similar, but slightly higher than the Alexander Valley. The Sonoma Valley and portions of the Napa Valley area receive significantly less rainfall. The viticultural area exemplifies the general temperature trend of Sonoma County, i.e., rising from south to north. Temperatures in the valley area are similar to those in the lower portion of the Alexander Valley area, but average slightly less due to the higher elevation. The growing season is usually shorter than the growing season in adjacent viticultural areas. Under the climatic region concept developed by Amerine and Winkler, the viticultural area is classified as Region II, i.e., the sum of the mean daily temperature above 50 °F (10 °C), expressed in temperature-time values of degree days for each day in the period April–October of any given year, is generally 3,001-3,500 for the viticultural area. The northern portions of the Napa Valley and Alexander Valley areas are also classified as Region III, while the Chalk Hill (Russian River Valley), area is classified as Region II, i.e., 2,500-3,000 degree days.

=== Soils ===
The soils in the valley and mountainous upland areas of the viticultural area are distinct from each other. This is due to the different parent material from which the soils were formed, i.e., alluvial in the valley and indurated rock in the uplands. The valley soils are derived from parent material of a relatively young geologic age, while the upland soils are derived from older parent material. The upland soils in the areas north and south of the valley area are derived from different-types of parent material. The soils in the northern area are derived from "Franciscan Formation" parent material laid down in the Jura-Cretaceous period, while the soils in the southern area are derived from parent material known as "Sonoma Volcanics" laid down in the late Pliocene to early Pleistocene epoch. The contrast in soils derived from these parent materials allows for an easy distinction between the valley area and the northern and southern upland areas. Adjacent areas are also characterized by soils derived from alluvial material and indurated rock. However, there are differences in the parent materials from which the soils were formed. The Napa Valley area to the southeast is primarily surrounded by uplands with soils derived from "Pleistocene Volcanic" formations whereas the Alexander and Dry Creek areas to the northwest are surrounded by uplands with soils derived from both "Franciscan Formation" and "Dry Creek Conglomerate" parent materials. The valley soils in the viticultural area are primarily of the Yolo-Cortina-Pleasanton association. The soils in the northern and southern upland areas are primarily of the Yorkville-Suther and Goulding-Toomes-Guenoc associations, respectively. However, the eastern portion of these areas, along the Sonoma County line, is characterized by soils of the Kidd-Forward-Cohasset association. Much of the Dry Creek and Alexander Valley areas are characterized by the same type of soil associations; however, the soils adjacent to the Russian River in the Alexander Valley area are deep, fertile soils not generally represented in the viticultural area. The Sonoma Valley which lies to the south along the eastern Sonoma County line and the Napa Valley viticultural area are also characterized by highly fertile soils. The soils used for grape production in the viticultural area are generally characterized by low fertility; many are rocky and gravelly and others exhibit a low pH.

== Viticulture ==
Several producers label their wines with the Knights Valley appellation. The three largest producers of Knights Valley designated wines are Beringer Vineyards, Kendall Jackson Winery, (under its Highland Estates label), and Bavarian Lion Vineyards.

Knights Valley is the warmest of Sonoma County's viticulture areas protected from direct Pacific Ocean influence. Warm afternoons and cool evenings provide the ideal environment for growing Bordeaux grape varieties. Cabernet Sauvignon remains the star in the valley. Also present are the rest of the Meritage blend: Merlot, Cabernet Franc, Malbec, and Petit Verdot, as well as Sauvignon Blanc, Chardonnay, Viognier, Syrah, and some limited plantings of other varietals.
