= Alexander Valley AVA =

American Viticultural Area in Sonoma County, California

Coordinates: 38°41′22″N 122°52′34″W

Alexander Valley
- Wine region
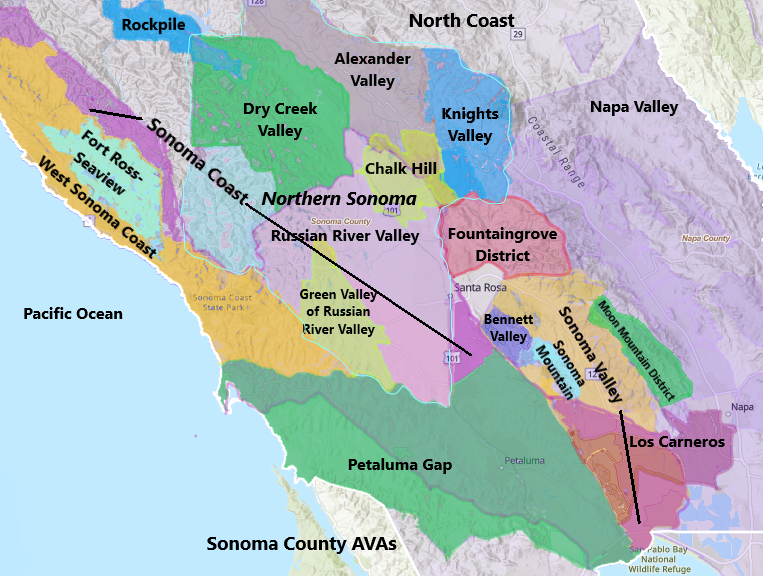
- Type: American Viticultural Area
- Year established: 1984; 1986 Amend; 1988 Amend; 1990 Amend; 2001 Amend; 2008 Amend
- Country: United States
- Part of: California, North Coast AVA, Sonoma County, Northern Sonoma AVA
- Other regions in California, North Coast AVA, Sonoma County, Northern Sonoma AVA: Chalk Hill AVA, Dry Creek Valley AVA, Green Valley of Russian River Valley AVA, Knights Valley AVA, Rockpile AVA, Russian River Valley AVA, Sonoma Coast AVA
- Growing season: 240-270 days
- Climate region: Region II-III
- Precipitation (annual average): 25–50 inches (640–1,270 mm)
- Soil conditions: Sandy to silt loam, clay and quartzite high in volcanic ash
- Total area: 76,915 acres (120 sq mi)
- Size of planted vineyards: 14,890 acres (6,030 ha)
- No. of vineyards: 77
- Grapes produced: Barbera, Cabernet Franc, Cabernet Sauvignon, Carignane, Chardonnay, Chenin Blanc, Gewürztraminer, Grenache, Malbec, Merlot, Muscat Canelli, Petit Verdot, Petite Sirah, Pinot Blanc, Pinot Noir, Riesling, Sangiovese, Sauvignon Blanc, Sémillon, Syrah, Tempranillo, Viognier, Zinfandel
- No. of wineries: 33

Alexander Valley is an American Viticultural Area (AVA) within a valley landform located in northeastern Sonoma County, California just north of Healdsburg. The wine appellation was established as the nation's 70th, the state's 43rd and the county's eighth AVA on October 24, 1984 by the Bureau of Alcohol, Tobacco and Firearms (ATF), Treasury after reviewing two petitions submitted by the Appellation Committee, on behalf of eighteen vintners, vineyard owners, winery operators (Group A), and another fifteen members of the local grape/wine industry representing Alexander Valley Vineyards, Robert Young Vineyards, Redwood Ranch and Vineyards, Murphy-Goode Vineyards, Jordan Winery and Vineyards, Garden Creek Ranch, Chateau St. Jean, Simi Winery, Cuneo and Saini Farm, Franeiscan Winery, River Oaks Winery, Hoot Owl Creek Ranch and Vineyard (Group B), proposing a viticultural area in Sonoma County, known as "Alexander Valley."

The proposals of Group A and Group B represented, respectively, the viewpoints of grape and wine industry members in the southern and northern portions of this area concerning establishment of the Alexander Valley viticultural area. Group A proposed an area extending northwest from the peak known as Chalk Hill to just south of the town of Asti. Approximately 11,000 of the 35,000 acres encompassed by this proposal are used for viticulture. Group B proposed an area encompassing the area proposed by Group A and an adjoining area extending northward to the Sonoma-Mendocmo County line. Approximately 1,700 of the additional 31,000 acres encompassed by this proposal are used for viticulture.
After extensive consideration of the evidence and comments presented regarding establishment of an Alexander Valley viticultural area, ATF found that the general area encompassed within the boundaries proposed by Group B merited establishment as the Alexander Valley viticultural area. Although they recognized there is evidence which would support both groups of petitioners in this matter, ATF found that the greater weight of-evidence supports the Group B proposal and that the general area encompassed within the boundaries proposed by Group B is locally and nationally referred to as Alexander Valley.

The boundaries of the appellation extends from the banks of the Russian River eastward to the foothills of the Mayacamas Mountains. It is resident to over one hundred wineries and vineyards, as well as the city of Cloverdale. It is the largest and most fully cultivated wine region in Sonoma County. Highway 101 passes through, and the Russian River flows through the valley flanked on both sides by vineyards. The view from the higher elevations of the valley rim extends far south to Taylor and Sonoma Mountains.

In 1986, the boundaries were expanded to include overlapping regions of the Russian River Valley AVA. Further acreage was realigned in 1988 from Chalk Hill AVA to accommodate existing vineyards that long labeled their wines as Alexander Valley but existed across the southeastern boundary. A third amendment occurred in 1990 to include vineyards owned by Sir Peter Michael and Ellis Alden in the foothills east of Geyserville. In 2001, the Gill Creek watershed was realigned from the Dry Creek AVA reclassifying the Alexander Valley boundary. In 2008, the appellation was expanded 1,300 acres (2.0 sq mi) to include three existing vineyards along Hiatt Road and Icaria Creek, a drainage basis to the Russian River. The expansion increased Alexander Valley's total area to 67,710 acres (106 sq mi).

== History ==
The valley was first settled by the Wappo and Pomo tribes. The valley was named in Wappo as Unutsawaholmanoma (/uː.nuː.tsɑː.wɑː.hoʊl.mɑː/ OO-noo-tsah-WAH-hohl-mah-NOH-mah) meaning "Toyon Bush Berry Place." Since its early history, the territory referred to as the "Alexander Valley" denoted the benchlands east of the Russian River leading up to the Mayacamas Mountains. The area west of the Russian River was known as "the plaines" or "the ranchos".
Viticulture in Alexander Valley dates back to 1843, when Cyrus Alexander, owner of a portion of the Rancho Sotoyome Mexican land grant, used vine cuttings collected from Fort Ross on the Pacific coast, to establish his vineyards. For most of its history the region was predominately associated with mass-produced bulk and jug wines made from indiscriminately planted field blends of red grape varieties.
The modern viticulture era of quality wine production began in the late 1960s when a new owner of Simi Winery sought to revive the area's long winemaking history. In 1963, one of Alexander Valley's most prestigious vineyards, the Robert Young Vineyard, was planted.
In the 1970s, a new wave of vintners, such as Chateau Souverain and Jordan Vineyard & Winery, descended upon the area and started making wines that received critical and consumer acclaim. Wine pioneer, Rodney Strong, whose namesake wineries are located in Chalk Hill, Russian River Valley and Alexander Valley, was also among the first to recognize the valley's potential, producing and releasing Sonoma County's first single vineyard Cabernet Sauvignon from the 1974 vintage. The vineyard designated was Strong's Alexander's Crown vineyard located near Jimtown. At the time, vineyards sourced most of their fruit to wineries outside the valley. One of these wineries, Chateau St. Jean, was so impressed with the quality of fruit that with the 1975 vintage of their Chardonnay they put the name of the Alexander Valley vineyard on the wine label. This "vineyard designated wine" would be one of the first premium wines in California wine history to have the name of the vineyard appear on the label. In 1988, E & J Gallo Winery purchased substantial tracts of land in the Alexander Valley to establish the fine wine brand of the company.

== Terroir ==
=== Geography and climate ===
The Alexander Valley covers a broad expanse of land east of the Russian River consisting of the watershed that runs southeast from the Mendocino County line down to the boundaries of the Chalk Hill AVA. The area is sheltered from the influence of the nearby Pacific Ocean by the low-lying hills northeast of Healdsburg. The dominant vineyard soil of the region is alluvial. During the day, the Alexander Valley is one of the warmest areas in Northern California but at night experiences a wide diurnal temperature variation that offers cool climate conditions. The region's proximity to the Russian River serves a source for early morning fog that covers the lower vineyard areas until it is burned off by the morning sun.
In addition, the Group B area has an average annual rainfall of 25–50 inches (640–1,270 mm), temperature of 58–60 °F (14–16 °C), and a frost-free season of 240-270 days. The Russian-River viticultural area to the south has an average annual rainfall of 25–45 inches (640–1,140 mm), temperature of 54–80 °F (12–27 °C), and a frost-free season of 240-260 days. Moreover, the surrounding uplands have an average annual rainfall of 30–70 inches (760–1,780 mm), temperature of 54–58 °F (12–14 °C), and a frost-free season of 230-270 days. Further, temperature comparison data indicate the area is warmer than the Russian River Valley viticultural area and cooler thin the Guenoc viticultural area to the north. Under the climatic region concept developed by Amerine and Winkler, the Group B area is classified as Region 3 and the Russian River Valley viticultural area as Region 2. The USDA plant hardiness zone range is from 9a to 10a.

=== Soils ===
The soils found in the valley arm are distinct from the soils found on the surrounding uplands. This is due to the different parent material, i.e., alluvial on the valley arm floor and indurated rock on the uplands, from which the soils were formed. The contrast in parent materials allows an easy distinction between the valley arm floor area and the upland area based on soils. The soils in the valley arm floor area are primarily of the Yolo-Cortina-Pleasanton association. This soil association is found throughout the valley arm. The soils on the upland areas are primarily of the Spreckels-Felta association southwest of the valley arm, Los Gatos-Henneke-Maymen association northwest of the valley arm, and Goulding-Toomes-Guenoc association east of the valley arm. Group "B" contends the uniformity and continuity of soils throughout the valley arm precludes the use of soil as a basis for division of the valley arm into separate areas. In addition, Group "B" contends the presence of the Yolo-Cortina-Pleasanton type of soil association, which typically forms on flat, alluvial basins, in the narrow portion of the valley arm near the town of Asti, indicates a single valley and not two separate valleys divided by a bedrock gorge, since, in order for this to have occurred, the same type of alluvial parent material must have been uniformly distributed throughout the valley arm and deposited in a geological basin.

== Wines ==
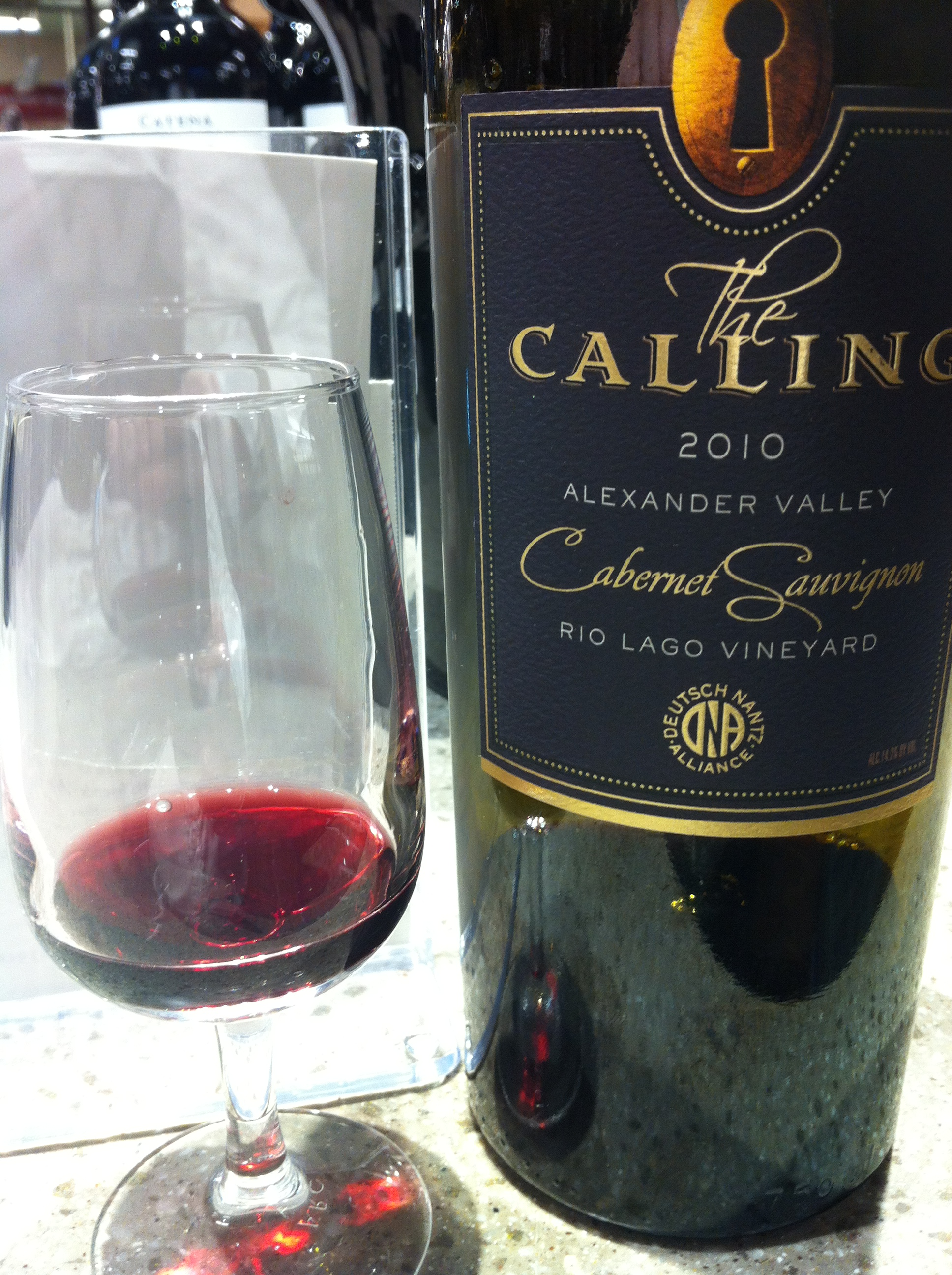
Alexander Valley Cabernet Sauvignon

A characteristic associated with Alexander Valley wines is a rich, fleshy mouthfeel and a degree of voluptuousness due to the area's generally warm climate and ability to sufficiently ripen the grapes. While the wines exhibit a degree of drinkability and accessibility in their youth, they may not have the same aging potential as wines from Napa Valley or even other areas of Sonoma County. The Alexander Valley is capable of growing a wide range of grape varieties but in recent years, the area has been noted for the quality of its Cabernet Sauvignon and Merlot. The alluvial soils of the region tend to impart a rich, chocolate note to the Cabernet. Other Alexander Valley varietals that have been gaining recognition include Chardonnay, Nebbiolo and Sangiovese. The Chardonnay from this region is characterized by its rich, tropical fruits. Some experts, such as Jancis Robinson, have speculated that Zinfandel and Sauvignon blanc may eventually prove themselves to be best suited to the climate and soils of the Alexander Valley.

== River Rock Casino controversy ==
In the early 21st century, there was controversy when the Alexander Valley Association of farmers, wineries and property owners objected to a proposal for a tribal casino on land owned by the Pomo people. In 1998, the association had been able to block a large winery expansion proposed by Kendall-Jackson, but in the dispute with the Pomo casino, federal and state laws granted the tribe the right to develop the land in any way they wished. The casino was built and named River Rock Casino. Resulting traffic problems along Highway 128 after the casino's opening in 2002 led to public safety concerns during harvest season because of the agricultural traffic on the roads. These concerns intensified after River Rock received a liquor license in 2008. In 2025, the ownership selected Caesars Entertainment as its development and management partner for the new integrated resort turning River Rock Casino into Caesars Republic Sonoma County.
