= Lake Sonoma =

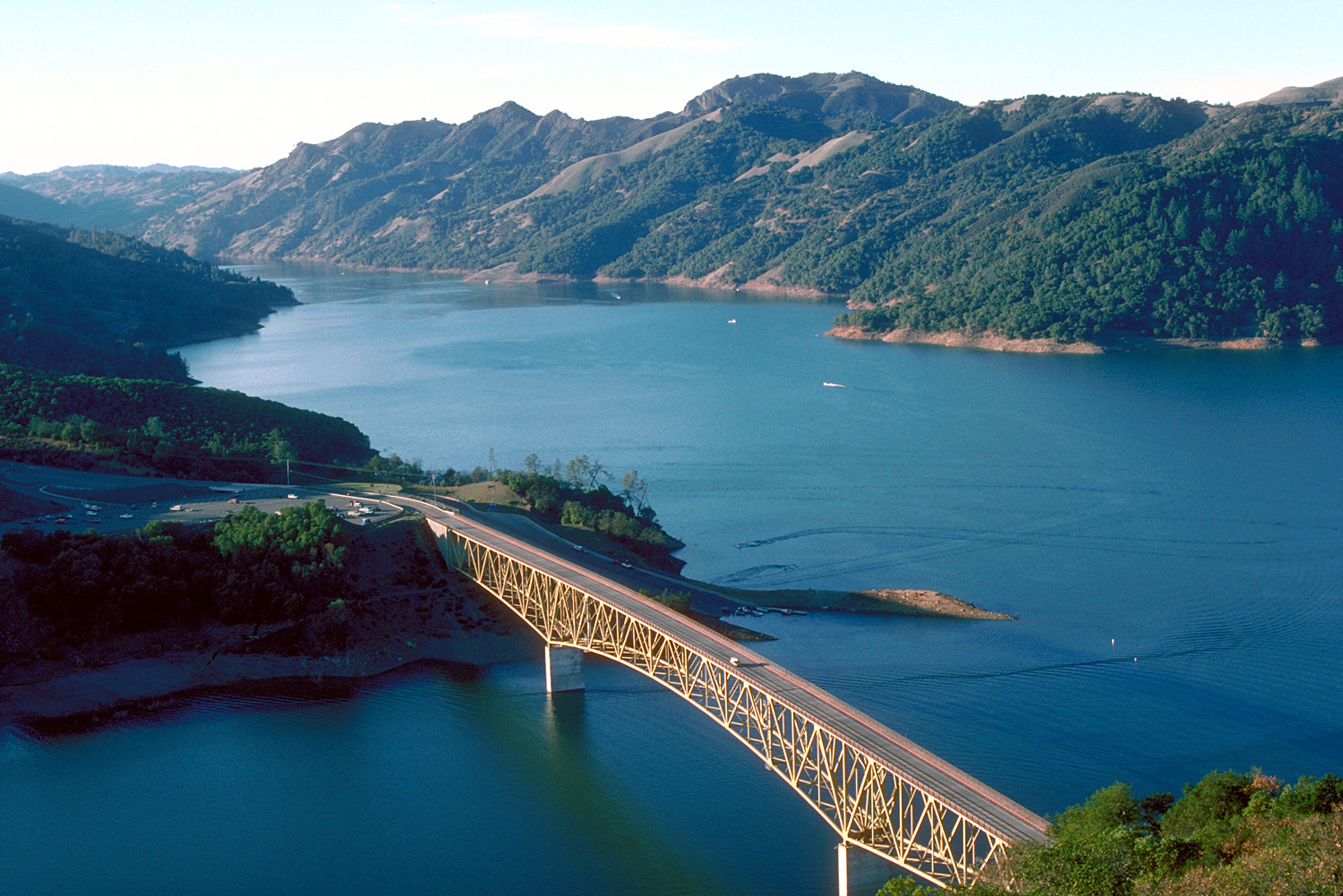
- The lake, just behind the Warm Springs Dam, which is to the right of this view

- Location within California Location within the United States

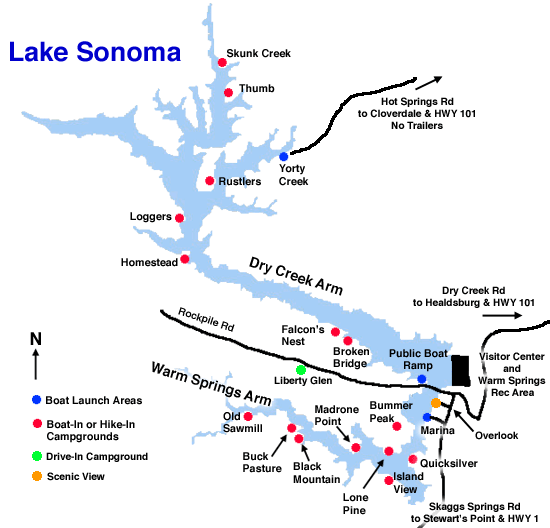
- Location: Sonoma County, California
- Coordinates: 38°43′05″N 123°00′34″W
- Lake type: Reservoir
- Primary inflows: Dry Creek
- Primary outflows: Dry Creek
- Catchment area: 130 sq mi (340 km^{2})
- Basin countries: United States
- Max. length: 5.7 mi (9 km)
- Surface area: 2,700 acres (1,100 ha)
- Water volume: 381,000 acre⋅ft (0.470 km^{3})
- Shore length^{1}: 50 miles (80 km)
- Surface elevation: 200 feet (61 m)
- ^{1} Shore length is not a well-defined measure.

Lake Sonoma is a reservoir west of Cloverdale in northern Sonoma County, California, created by the construction of Warm Springs Dam. The lake provides water for countywide growth and development, and for recreation.

At full capacity, it has 50 miles (80 km) of shoreline, a surface area of more than 2,700 acres (11 km^{2}), and holds 381,000 acre-feet (470,000,000 m^{3}) of water. Activities include boating, swimming, fishing, riding, hiking, camping, and hunting. Notable features include the Milt Brandt Visitor Center, the adjacent Congressman Don Clausen Fish Hatchery, and the Warm Springs Recreation Area below the dam. Access from U.S. Route 101 is by way of Canyon Road (from the south) from Geyserville, or Dutcher Creek Road (from the north) from Cloverdale. The Warm Springs Creek Bridge crosses the lake just south of the dam, connecting the communities east of the lake to the Rockpile AVA to its west.

== History ==
Pomo people had lived in the Dry Creek and Warm Springs region for over five thousand years. The construction of this lake destroyed 122 areas associated with the history of human use. This included ten house-pits, five hunting blinds, two chert quarries, and eleven locations with petroglyphs. In addition, there were eight known gathering spaces where, for more than a hundred years, special plants were collected by Pomo people for traditional use. Some Pomo people resisted the creation of the lake, assisting archaeologists at Sonoma State University in writing about the prehistory and history of Warm Springs Dam, Lake Sonoma, and the Dry Creek Valley.

== Warm Springs Dam ==
The US Army Corps of Engineers built Warm Springs Dam across Dry Creek. Completed in 1982 (44 years ago), this rolled-earth embankment dam is 319 feet (97 metres) high, 3,000 ft (900 m) long, and 30 feet (9 metres) wide at the top. It contains 30,000,000 cubic yards (23,000,000 cubic metres) of earth. The dam aids in flood control, and a hydroelectric plant produces electricity from the water released downstream. A minimum amount of flow must be maintained in Dry Creek to allow fish migration.

== Water quality ==
The California Office of Environmental Health Hazard Assessment (OEHHA) has developed a safe eating advisory for Lake Sonoma based on levels of mercury found in fish caught from this water body.

== Campgrounds ==
Lake Sonoma offers 96 drive-in campsites and two group sites at the Liberty Glen campground. The campground is located on a ridgeline overlooking Lake Sonoma, each campsite includes a firepit, picnic table and tent area, with primitive facilities and no potable water. The campground is closed indefinitely for repairs to infrastructure.

There are 15 secluded primitive campsites surrounding the lake: 12 can be reached by boat, horse, mountain bike or on foot, 3 can only be reached by boat and 1 due to its location on a ridge can't be accessed by boat.

== Panorama ==
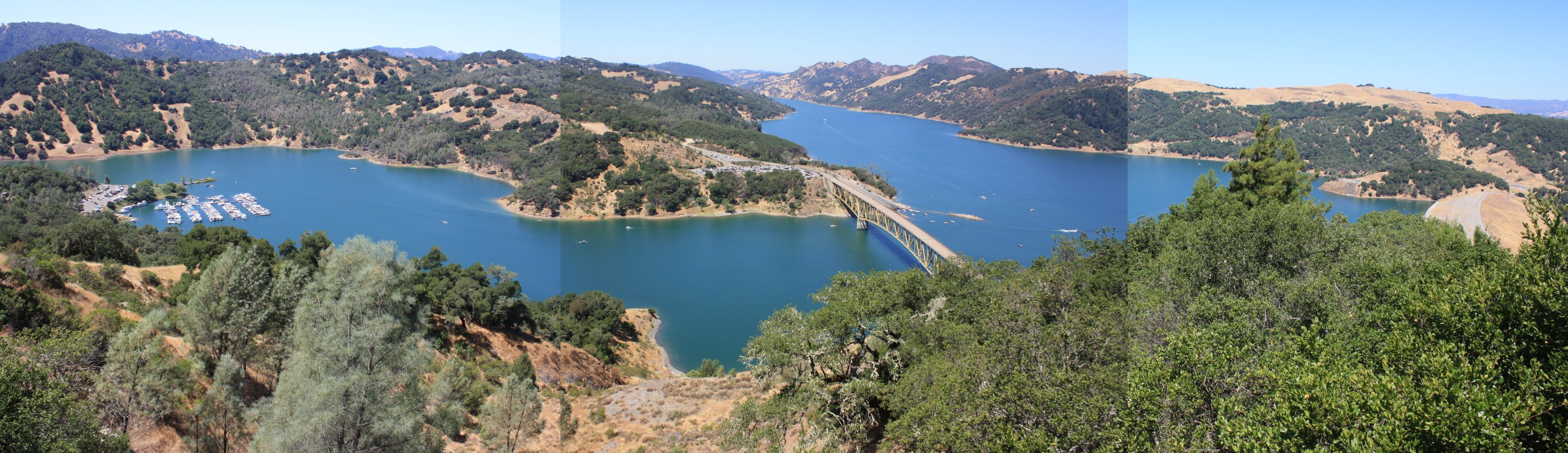
Warm Springs Arm (left) and Dry Creek Arm (right) of Lake Sonoma as viewed from the vista point located southeast of Warm Springs Dam

== See also ==
- Dry Creek Valley AVA
- Lake Mendocino
- List of dams and reservoirs in California
- List of lakes in California
- List of lakes in the San Francisco Bay Area
- List of largest reservoirs of California
