= Dry Creek (Sonoma County, California) =

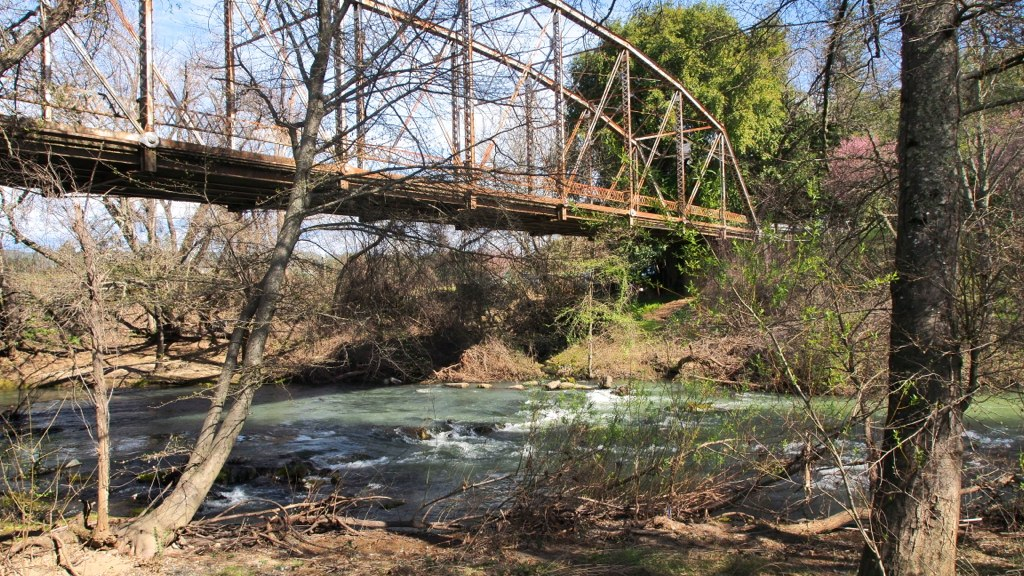
- Lambert Bridge spanning Dry Creek

Location
- Country: United States
- State: California
- Region: Sonoma and Mendocino counties

Physical characteristics
- Source: Snow Mountain
  - location: 6 mi (10 km) west of Hopland
  - coordinates: 38°55′55″N 123°13′2″W
  - elevation: 760 ft (230 m)
- Mouth: Russian River
  - location: 2 mi (3 km) south of Healdsburg, California
  - coordinates: 38°35′10″N 122°51′26″W
  - elevation: 82 ft (25 m)

Dry Creek is a 43.0-mile-long (69.2 km) stream in the California counties of Sonoma and Mendocino. It is a tributary of the Russian River, with headwaters in Mendocino County.

The Dry Creek Valley AVA is an American Viticultural Area.

== Geography ==
=== Lake Sonoma and the Warm Springs Dam ===
The creek flows roughly southeast until reaches Lake Sonoma, which is formed by the Warm Springs Dam. Several other creeks that used to merge with the creek now flow into the lake. Downstream of the dam, the creek continues flowing roughly southeast until its confluence with the Russian River.

=== Bridges ===
Dry Creek is spanned by numerous bridges, including:

- at Yoakim Bridge Road, a concrete continuous tee beam built in 1956
- at Westside Road, a steel truss built in 1934
- at Lambert Bridge Road, a steel truss built in 1915
- at State Route 128, a prestressed concrete Tee Beam built in 2005

== See also ==
- Dry Creek Rancheria
- List of watercourses in the San Francisco Bay Area
- Sonoma County wine
