= Northern Sonoma AVA =

American Viticultural Area in Sonoma County, California

Coordinates: 38°29′47″N 122°47′42″W

Northern Sonoma
- Wine region
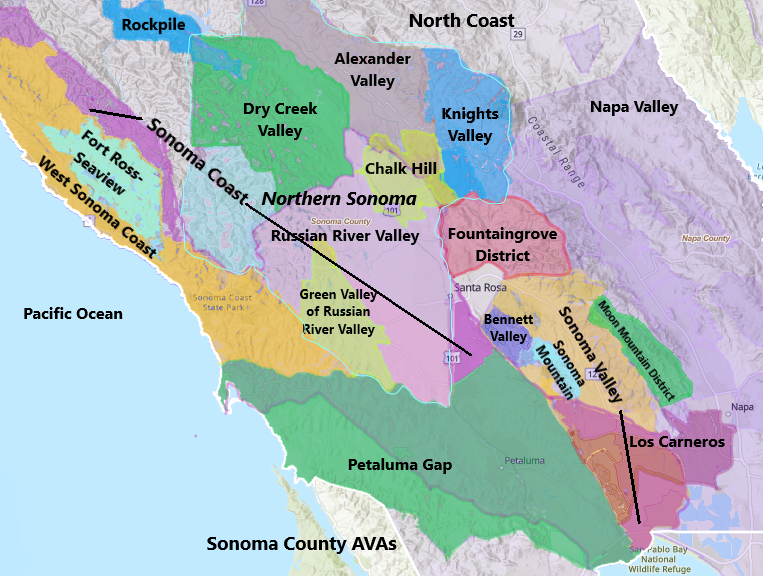
- Type: American Viticultural Area
- Year established: 1985; 1986 Amend; 1990 Amend; 2011 Expand
- Country: United States
- Part of: California, North Coast AVA, Sonoma County
- Other regions in California, North Coast AVA, Sonoma County: Sonoma Valley AVA
- Sub-regions: Alexander Valley AVA, Chalk Hill AVA, Dry Creek Valley AVA, Green Valley of Russian River Valley AVA, Knights Valley AVA, Rockpile AVA, Russian River Valley AVA, Sonoma Coast AVA
- Total area: 329,000 acres (514 sq mi); 2011:373,244 acres (583 sq mi)
- Size of planted vineyards: 26,000 acres (11,000 ha)
- No. of vineyards: 72
- Grapes produced: Chardonnay

Northern Sonoma is an American Viticultural Area (AVA) in Sonoma County, California. The appellation covers most of the county with the notable exceptions of the Los Carneros AVA, Petaluma Gap AVA and Sonoma Valley AVA wine regions, which are located in the southern portion of the county. It was established as the nation's 78^{th}, the state's 45^{th} and the county's eleventh wine appellation on May 16, 1985 by the Bureau of Alcohol, Tobacco and Firearms (ATF), Treasury after reviewing the petition proposing the viticultural area named "Northern Sonoma." The creation of the Northern Sonoma AVA was largely based on the petitioning of the E & J Gallo Winery as part of their expansion of their Gallo of Sonoma brand. The viticultural area entirely encompasses Alexander Valley AVA, Chalk Hill AVA, Dry Creek Valley AVA, Knights Valley AVA, Russian River Valley AVA, Sonoma Coast AVA appellations, and portions of the Green Valley of Russian River Valley AVA and Rockpile AVA.

The majority of the grape varieties grown in Sonoma County are grown in Northern Sonoma AVA, including Cabernet Sauvignon, Sauvignon blanc, Chardonnay, and Zinfandel. Zinfandel is more commonly grown in the Rockpile and Dry Creek Valleys. Gallo Family Vineyards are known for their Cabernet Sauvignon and Chardonnay while Rodney Strong Vineyards is known for its Zinfandel and Sauvignon blanc. Bacigalupi Vineyards, situated in the Russian River Valley, are known for their Chardonnay. The plant hardiness zone ranges from 9a to 10a.

== See also ==
- Sonoma County wine
