= Rockpile AVA =

American Viticultural Area in Sonoma County, California

Coordinates: 38°47′32″N 123°13′46″W

Rockpile
- Wine region
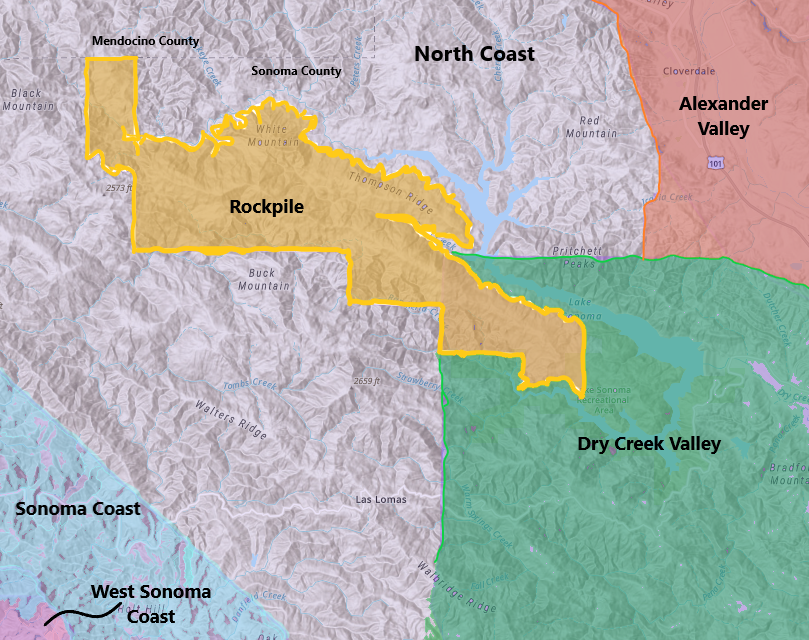
- Type: American Viticultural Area
- Year established: 2002
- Years of wine industry: 182
- Country: United States
- Part of: California, North Coast AVA, Sonoma County, Northern Sonoma AVA, Dry Creek Valley AVA
- Precipitation (annual average): 50 to 70 in (1,300–1,800 mm)
- Soil conditions: Loam to clay loam
- Total area: 15,400 acres (24.1 sq mi)
- Size of planted vineyards: 160 acres (65 ha)
- No. of vineyards: 11
- Grapes produced: Cabernet Sauvignon, Malbec, Petite Sirah, Pinot Noir, Syrah, Shiraz, Zinfandel

Rockpile is an American Viticultural Area (AVA) located in northern-most area of Sonoma County, California overlapping the northwestern corner of Dry Creek Valley appellation and adjacent to the southwestern shores of Lake Sonoma on the southern Mendocino Range. It was established on February 28, 2002 as the nation's 146^{th}, the state's 88^{th} and Sonoma County's twelfth appellation by the Bureau of Alcohol, Tobacco and Firearms (ATF), Treasury after reviewing the petition submitted by Jack W. Florence Sr. on behalf of the Rockpile Appellation Committee, proposing a viticultural area named "Rockpile." The viticultural area encompasses approximately 15,400 acres (24 sq mi) containing eleven vineyards cultivating about 160 acres (65 ha) that lie at or are above the 800 feet (240 m) contour line. The plant hardiness zone ranges from 9a to 10a.

== History ==
The area delineated in this petition contains three well established entities long known by the name Rockpile. It was the name given to the obvious rocky peak situated about fifteen miles (24 km) from the Sonoma County Pacific coast and just a few miles south of Mendocino County. Historian Cathy Park described the formation of "La Roca Monte Rancho" in 1911 and the subsequent development of the name Rockpile, as follows:

In 1911, Cap Ornbaum convinced a group of wealthy friends to join him in forming a land investment partnership. Their first purchase was the Bee Springs Ranch on the Northwest slope of Rockpile Peak. He then engaged in tough negotiations to purchase the bordering Rockpile Ranch which included all of Rockpile Peak. About that time one of Ornbaun's partners came up with the name "La Roca Monte Rancho" for the partnership. Their expertise in accumulating land was far greater than their expertise in the Spanish language and the land holdings grew over time eventually extending from Rockpile Peak to the Bishop homestead for a total of about 21,000 acres (8,500 ha). The property was soon referred to simply as Rockpile Ranch. Ornbaun and his family ran sheep on the property and entertained many guests from San Francisco in the hunting lodge they developed on the property. To manage the vast area, they divided the ranch into three sections each with a resident ranch manager. The sections were referred to as Rockpile 1,2, and 3. The old Bishop Ranch was Rockpile 3, and that was the main headquarters. During the Depression much of the property was sold, but 18,000 acres (7,300 ha) of the Rockpile Ranch were kept intact and stayed in the Ornbaun family. By the late 1930's it was one of the largest sheep ranches in Northern California and folks from Cloverdale to Healdsburg began referring to the general region as "Rockpile". By then the road winding up the mountains and along the ridge to the main headquarters of Rockpile Ranch, had become Rockpile Road reflecting the adoption of the name for the high country. It should be noted that Rockpile Ranch is identified by that name on the USGS Map entitled Big Foot Mountain - 1991.

Tennessee Bishop's road opened up the high country to homesteaders, and Cap Ornbaun's well known sheep ranch played a part in the growth of the county's agricultural economy. The name "Rockpile" for a particularly beautiful region of high country is part of their legacy. Nearly 150 years later, the name "Rockpile" continues to evoke nostalgia for a time when the independent spirit of strong willed folks had free rein. With creation of Lake Sonoma by the U.S. Corps of Engineers, Rockpile Road was paved and brought to Sonoma County standards.

Svente Parker Hallengren, a Swedish immigrant of the grape growing Mauritson family of Dry Creek Valley, initially planted grapes in the Rockpile area in 1884. In the early 1960s, all but 700 ridgetop acres (283 ha) of the 4,000 acres (1,600 ha) ranch was acquired by the Army Corps Of Engineers to develop Lake Sonoma. The area was replanted with grapes in 1994, by Jack Florence Jr. and Ulises Valdez Sr., using cuttings from 100-year-old Zinfandel vines at St. Peter's Catholic Church in Cloverdale.

== Terroir ==
=== Topography ===
The petitioner has defined the viticultural area based on a geographic combination of elevation, terrain and climate. The elevation of the Rockpile area, as shown on the USGS maps, spans from 800 to 1,900 feet (240–580 m). According to the petition, the east and north side boundaries are delineated by the 800 feet (240 m) elevation, while the south and west boundaries average close to 1,800 feet (550 m) in elevation. Currently, vineyards are established from 800 to 1,800 feet (240–550 m) elevations, with approximately 95% of the planted area above the 1,000 feet (300 m) elevation. This higher elevation provides different climatic influences.
The area for which approval as Rockpile is requested is an irregular parcel of land that roughly simulates a rectangle, running from east to west. The eastern portion starts at the western edge of the Lake Sonoma Recreational Area, owned by the USA and operated by the Corp of Engineers, and runs in a generally west-northwesterly direction. The western end of the subject area encompasses Rockpile Peak and Rockpile Ranch No. 3. Wine grapes are currently being grown at each end of the subject area. The entire area is enclosed within 800 ft (240 m) elevation contours with U.S. survey lines connecting regions of higher elevation.

=== Climate ===
Spring daytime temperatures in the viticultural area run 5 to 10 °F (−15 to −12 °C) cooler than the Healdsburg area, approximately ten miles (16 km) southeast, according to the petition. In the absence of a marine inversion layer, or fog, the temperature decreases about 6 °F (−14 °C) for additional 1,000 feet (300 m) of elevation. The cool prevailing northwesterly spring breezes, which are not as prevalent at the lower elevations of the protected valley floors, increase the cooling effect. According to the petition, the viticultural effect of this cooling creates a delayed bud break and slower growth, resulting in delayed bloom and fruit set. Summer weather in the Rockpile area, according to the petition, is slightly warmer than the area valleys due to less fog and more clear weather, resulting in increased sunshine and warmer temperatures. On days when the marine inversion is shallower than 1,000 feet (300 m), Rockpile is above the fog. Fall night temperatures, as stated in the petition, can be warmer than in the surrounding areas, with less fog at 800 feet (240 m) and above than at lower elevations. The crucial grape ripening period of September and early October is generally warmer and drier in the Rockpile locality than in surrounding viticultural areas.

=== Soil ===
The soils, according to the petition, differ from neighboring valley viticultural areas by the relative absence of silt and sand, the higher oxidized iron properties (red color), and the clay subsoil. The topsoil, generally loam to clay loam with a red to brown color, is twelve to twenty-four inches (300–610 mm) in depth in the better viticultural locations. There are areas of small rock and gravel mixed in the topsoil, some with outcroppings of larger rock. The topsoil depth, and amounts of clay, rock and organic matter vary within the area. The topsoil is acid to very acid, and the subsoil is more clay-like in texture; however, areas of weathered shale and sandstone, in addition to the topography, contribute to well-drained vineyard conditions.

== See also ==
- Sonoma County wine
- Wine Country (California)
