= Green Valley of Russian River Valley AVA =

American Viticultural Area in Sonoma County, California

Coordinates: 38°25′24″N 122°53′59″W

Green Valley of Russian River Valley
- Wine region
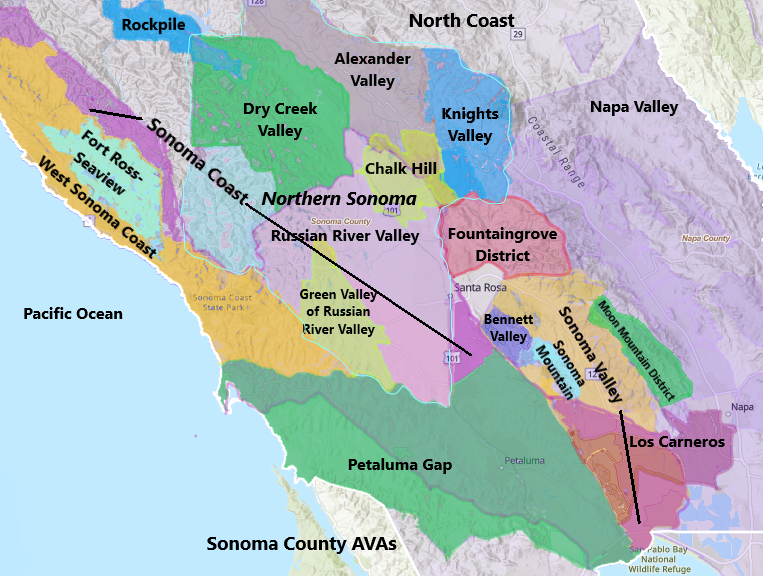
- Sonoma County AVAs
- Type: American Viticultural Area
- Year established: 1983; 2007 Amend
- Country: United States
- Part of: California, North Coast AVA, Sonoma County, Sonoma Coast AVA, Northern Sonoma AVA, Russian River Valley AVA,
- Climate region: Region I
- Soil conditions: Goldridge fine sandy loam
- Total area: 32,000 acres (50 sq mi)
- Size of planted vineyards: 3,600 acres (1,457 ha)
- No. of vineyards: 70+
- Grapes produced: Chardonnay, Gewürztraminer, Pinot Blanc, Pinot Noir, Syrah, Zinfandel
- No. of wineries: 9

Green Valley of Russian River Valley (formerly Sonoma County Green Valley) is an American Viticultural Area (AVA) in Sonoma County, California. The wine appellation was established on November 21, 1983, as the nation's 54th, the state's 35th and the county's seventh AVA by the Bureau of Alcohol, Tobacco and Firearms (ATF), Treasury after reviewing the petition submitted by Ms. Audrey M. Sterling, one of the partners of the Iron Horse Ranch and Vineyard, on behalf of local vintners and growers proposing a viticultural area in Sonoma County known as "Green Valley."
Green Valley landform encompasses approximately 7.7 by 7.4 miles (12.4 km × 11.9 km) measuring about 36,467 acres (57 sq mi) within its boundaries. Its location also resides within the Russian River Valley AVA designated the previous month. The area lies west of the Santa Rosa Plain and is located around Analy Township nestled in the southwestern corner of the Russian River Valley whose close proximity to the Pacific Ocean makes it one of the coolest appellations within Sonoma County. The climate in the Green Valley is even cooler than other parts of the Russian River Valley favoring cool climate varietals as Pinot Noir, Chardonnay and Gewürztraminer for which Green Valley is best known as well as a few examples of cool-climate Syrah and Zinfandel. The plant hardiness zone ranges from 9a to 10a.

== History ==
The name "Green Valley" was used to designate the viticultural area as the name refers to Green Valley Creek which flows north into the Russian River and lies west of the Santa Rosa Plain. Various 19th and early 20th Century atlases and histories of Sonoma County document that grapes has been grown in Green Valley since 1836 when the area was settled during the 19th Century. In the 1911 tome History of Sonoma County, the author notes the existence of wineries in Green Valley at Forestville, Graton and Sebastopol. Most of the Sonoma County vineyards were removed during Prohibition. Sonoma viticulture was revived in the late 1960s, continuing in Green Valley through the 1970s and the beginning of the 1980s when substantial vineyard plantings and replanting occurred.

Green Valley was initially designated associated with the name "Sonoma County" in 1983 and was similar in structure to the Solano County Green Valley AVA established in 1982. Consequently, many vintages that could have been labeled with the "Sonoma County Green Valley AVA" designation were instead labeled by vintners with the broader designation of the Russian River Valley AVA, due to the broader market awareness of Russian River Valley wines. In 2006, the Winegrowers and Vintners of Sonoma County's Green Valley, an association of local winegrowers and vintners based in Sebastopol, petitioned the Alcohol and Tobacco Tax and Trade Bureau (TTB), Treasury for a name change to specifically associate Green Valley with the larger and renown Russian River Valley AVA. The Green Valley appellation name was changed by the TTB final ruling, effective on April 23, 2007, to "Green Valley of Russian River Valley."

== Terroir ==
=== Topography ===
The petition and attached documents contain substantial information which show that the Sonoma County Green Valley viticultural area, as delineated in this final rule, is distinguished from surrounding areas by its cool climate, predominant soil type, and unique geographical characteristics. The water from Green Valley Creek and other neighboring creeks in the Green Valley area provides the source for frost protection which is usually essential for successful viticultural activities in a Region I zone. The climate of this area, especially the northern end of it, is far different from that of the coast. The range of mountains lying along its western border breaks the fury of the ocean blast which sweeps up from the sea. Because of its sheltered position, Green Valley has always been an extremely rich and productive belt of country and has always produced much fine fruit.

=== Climate ===
Green Valley viticultural area, as delineated in this final rule, is distinguished from surrounding areas by its cool climate, predominant soil type, and unique geographical characteristics. These distinguishing characteristics are as. follows: (a)The climate of this area, especially the northern end of it, is far different from that of the coast. The range of mountains lying along its western border helps to moderate~the fury of any ocean blast which sweeps up from the sea. In general, the Green Valley area has been established as a Region I growing area as classified by the University of California at Davis system of heat summation by degree-days.
Green Valley lies within the "coastal cool" area climate in contrast to the Alexander Valley area to the north which lies within the "coastal warm" area climate. The climate and soil throughout the area are conducive to growing cool weather varietals such as Pinot Noir and Chardonnay. The longer growing season resulting from the cool nights and early morning fog permits picking mature fruit at lower sugar levels and the maintenance of higher acid levels. On the slopes of the hills in Green Valley that provide enough sunlight, there can also be grown fully ripe Cabernet Sauvignon and Zinfandel. These varieties are typically harvested substantially later in Green Valley than in the warmer areas of Sonoma County. The water from Green Valley Creek and other neighboring creeks in the Green Valley area provides the source for frost protection which is usually essential for successful viticultural activities in a Region I zone.

=== Soils ===
Green Valley was a shallow inland sea that slowly drained into the Pacific some three to five million years ago leaving behind a residue of various fine sandy soil types. The distinctive soil of the Green Valley area is mostly Goldridge fine sandy loam. The predominately Goldridge soil and the generally hilly terrain provides good drainage, a valuable component for high-quality wine grape production.

== See also ==
- Green Valley Creek
- Russian River (California)
- Sonoma County wine
- Wine Country (California)
