= Chalk Hill AVA =

American Viticultural Area in Sonoma County, California

Coordinates: 38°36′53″N 122°46′33″W

Chalk Hill
- Wine region
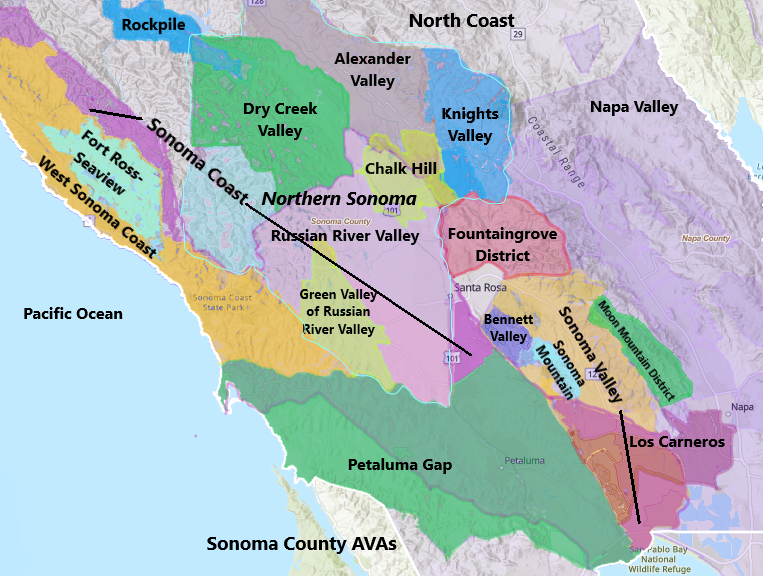
- Type: American Viticultural Area
- Year established: 1983; 1988 Amend
- Country: United States
- Part of: California, North Coast AVA, Sonoma County, Sonoma Coast AVA, Northern Sonoma AVA, Russian River Valley AVA
- Growing season: 242 days
- Climate region: Region I-II
- Heat units: 2,010-2,548 GDD units
- Precipitation (annual average): 36 inches (910 mm)
- Soil conditions: Sandy to silt loam, clay and quartzite high in volcanic ash
- Total area: 21,120 acres (33 sq mi); 19,840 acres (31 sq mi)
- Size of planted vineyards: 1,600 acres (650 ha)
- No. of vineyards: 6
- Grapes produced: Cabernet Sauvignon, Chardonnay, Malbec, Merlot, Petit Verdot, Pinot gris, Sangiovese, Sauvignon Blanc, Sauvignon Gris, Semillon, Syrah, Zinfandel
- No. of wineries: 8

Chalk Hill is an American Viticultural Area (AVA) located in Sonoma County, California about eight miles (13 km) north of Santa Rosa. It was established as the nation's 49^{th}, the state's 32^{nd} and the county's fourth wine appellation on October 21, 1983 by the Bureau of Alcohol, Tobacco and Firearms (ATF), Treasury after reviewing the petition submitted by seven local vintners and growers, Donna Maria Vineyards, Blasi Vineyard, Oak Hill Vineyard, Balverne Winery & Vineyards, Landmark Vineyards, DeLoach Vineyards and F. Korbel Bros, proposing a viticultural area in Sonoma County known as "Sonoma Chalk Hill."

ATF proposed to remove the county name "Sonoma" from the appellation name "Sonoma Chalk Hill." The feedback submitted by six of the seven original petitioners stated that the primary purpose for including the county name was to inform consumers that the Chalk Hill area is in Sonoma County. However, the commenters agreed with ATF that this information can be conveyed by placing "Sonoma County" elsewhere on the wine label.

The appellation boundaries outline approximately 21,120 acres (33 sq mi) of the northeast corner within the Russian River Valley AVA. The area is known locally as "Chalk Hill" deriving its namesake from a prominent hill with its unique geological distinction being the "chalky white" tuff in the soil caused by ash deposited by centuries of volcanic activity from Mount Saint Helena. This "white" soil also contributes to the high quality of the fruit produced in the vineyards.
Most of the region's 1,600 acres (650 ha) of cultivated vineyards are located to the east of U.S. Route 101, near the town of Windsor, along the western slopes of the Mayacamas Mountains that rise to elevations from 200 to 1,600 feet (61–488 m). Since 1978, the name "Chalk Hill" has appeared on wine labels produced by a Windsor area winery. Chalk Hill's unique soils performs well with planting of white wine varietals like Chardonnay and Sauvignon Blanc. Its climate is relatively warm due to the influence of a thermal belt that runs through the area. Harvest time often takes place in September while harvest in the surrounding regions usually takes place in October.

In 1988, ATF established a realignment of the boundary common to the Alexander Valley and Chalk Hill viticultural areas so that vineyards immediately within the north-central leg of Chalk Hill, about 1,076 acres (2 sq mi), were relocated to the southeastern corner of the Alexander Valley.

== History ==
Viticulture in Sonoma County dates back to the establishment of the last of the California missions, Mission San Francisco de Solano, at Sonoma in 1824. The vineyard at the mission was planted in 1825. In the late 1850s Jacob Gundlach and Count Agoston Haraszthy established major plantings of the European vine, vitis vinifera, the first such plantings in the United States.
By 1855, grapes were being cultivated at Windsor, the principal town closest to Chalk Hill viticultural area. The vineyard belonged to a German immigrant named Jackson Meyers, whose lands extended into what is now the Chalk Hill district. Meyers' vines have not been identified as to variety but quite possibly were Riesling. Jackson Meyers also founded the first winery in Windsor. The Russian River Flag newspaper of Healdsburg, Ca. for September 9, 1875, described the winery as two stories, 30 ft × 60 ft (9.1 m × 18.3 m) with a capacity of 75,000 gallons. Windsor gained its second winery in the year of 1875. The founder was Barney Hoen who converted an old church into a winery and added a wing to the structure. The Hoen Winery was described in the Healdsburg Enterprise of August 5, 1875 as being the second largest winery in the county!--capable of holding 200,000 gallons.
Sonoma County became known nationally and internationally as a leader in the production of California premium wines. By 1870, the County led all other California counties in the volume of wine produced. By the 1880s, Sonoma wines were receiving awards at expositions in the United States and abroad. By the mid-1890's there were a half dozen wineries located in the Windsor area and 43 vineyards. Vineyard plantings and the number of wineries increased steadily into the Twentieth Century. In 1919, there were 700 bonded wineries in California, of which 256 were in Sonoma County and 120 in Napa County until Prohibition when wineries closed and vineyards uprooted and converted to grow other crops.
Following the Repeal, there were 160 bonded wineries in California and only a handful in Sonoma County. The reason Sonoma's viticulture suffered greatly during Prohibition and the Great Depression was that the vineyards and wineries were, for the most part, very small family enterprises which did not possess the capital to survive. During the subsequent years until the early 1960s, Sonoma County wines lost much of their former renown because wineries turned heavily to the production of bulk jug wines which did not bear their own labels.

== Terroir ==
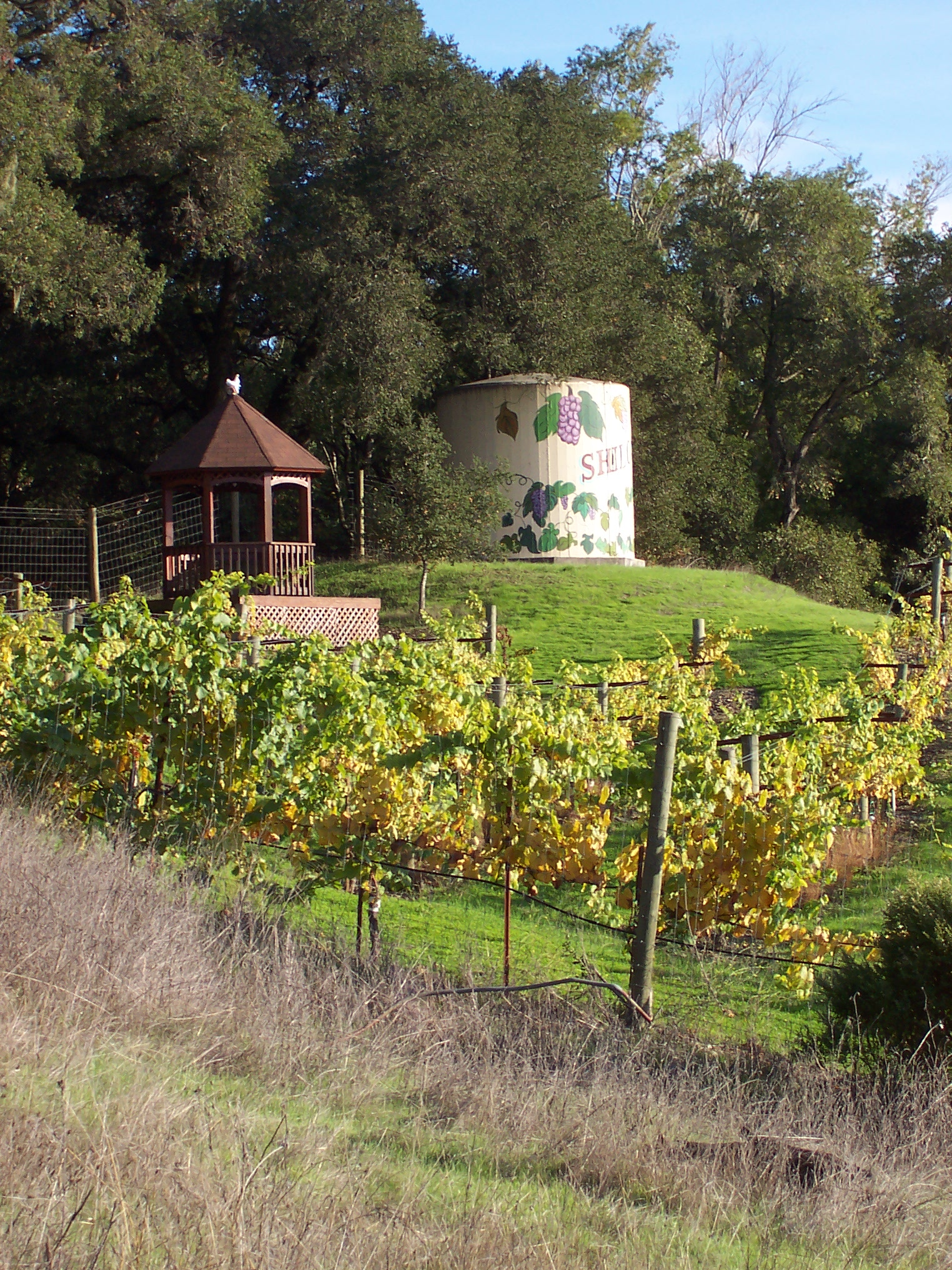
Shiloh Hill Vineyard in the Chalk Hill

=== Geography ===
Chalk Hill possesses geographical features which distinguish its viticultural features from the surrounding areas based on climate, soil type, and other geographical features. The elevations of over 95 percent of the land in Chalk Hill range from 200 feet (61 m) to approximately 1,330 feet (410 m) compared with elevations on the floor of the Russian River Valley of just over or under 100 feet (30 m). The predominant vineyard plantings in the AVA are at elevations ranging from 200 to 800 feet (61–244 m). These plantings are on lands which are gently rolling to steep and which can be described as benchlands, tablelands and hills. There are numerous tillable hill "islands" and peninsulas. The area overlooks the Russian River Valley to the west and the Santa Rosa Plain to the south. Many of the vineyards which replanted on the steeper slopes are contoured and terraced.

The geological strata of the Chalk Hill viticultural area, from the lower to the higher elevations, consists of open meadows with vegetation being native grasses, the brushlands of chaparral, then timberlands consisting of several species of native Oak.

Throughout the AVA, there is evidence of volcanic debris, including giant stone crystals which formed into octagonal shapes as they cooled from molten lava to stone. It is across this terrain that vineyards are planted on meadowlands, slopes and hills which are not too steep to cultivate.

=== Climate ===
Chalk Hill is distinguished by a micro-climate with a marine influence. Based on the University of California heat summation scale, temperatures range from Region I, less than 2,500 degree days, to Region II, 2,501 to 3,000 degree days. Most of the area's vineyards lie within a zone composed of thermal belts which protect them from damaging spring frost. The climate of the area is influenced by the location of Mount Saint Helena, to the northeast, in relation to the mouth of the Russian River, to the southwest, at the town of Jenner on the Pacific Ocean, and San Pablo Bay to the south. A straight line drawn from the mouth of the Russian River at Jenner to the sunnnit of Mount St. Helena crosses the AVA. As the heat rises during the summer months at the base of Mount St. Helena (approximately 12 miles from the AVA westerly boundary) an atmospheric condition is created which "pulls" a mild wind from the Pacific Ocean through the corridor formed by the Russian River and across the hills which make up the area. These moderating daytime breezes have a favorable affect on winegrowing in the AVA. As temperatures drop at the base of Mount St. Helena at night, these breezes subside and the winds shift from the direction of San Pablo Bay to the south. The average annual rainfall in the AVA is approximately 36 in (910 mm), almost all of which occurs between November 1 and March 31.

During late July and August, as the grapes are coming to maturity, these warmer winds from San Pablo Bay pick up cooler ocean winds moving easterly from Bodega Bay. As condensation occurs, the resulting fog is pushed across the Santa Rosa Plain and into the hills of the viticultural area (usually after midnight). Temperatures drop to around 55 °F, the mornings remain cool and, with the higher elevations which distinguish the Area, the fog has usually "burned off" by noon and the afternoons are sunny and warm.

The atmospheric conditions created by the relationship of these physical features results in a "September" vineyard area. This means that the harvests are usually completed by the end of September even for late-ripening grape varieties which are not normally harvested until October in surrounding areas. The area is warmer than the greater Russian River Valley and cooler than Alexander Valley and Dry Creek Valley.

=== Soils ===
The Chalk Hill viticultural area is distinguished by what is known as "white" soil. The area takes its name from the "chalky white" ash that characterizes its soils which themselves does not contain any chalk but rather are composed of a mixture of quartzite abundant volcanic ash, sand and silty loam. The volcanic ash was emitted into the area by Mount Saint Helena over a course of centuries, creating vineyard soils that are not very fertile and are able to restrain vigor in the vines.
The uniqueness of the soil is very apparent. Even when moisture is adequate to sustain growth the soils appear to be dry. Vineyards in the area are on generally deep soils, but ones which are lower in fertility. This contributes to the high quality of their fruit. The vines at full maturity are not large and their yields are low compared with yields in the surrounding valleys where mature vines planted on deeper and much richer soils are larger and more vigorous. Yields of two to three tons of grapes per acre are common in the AVA and yields in excess of four tons per acre are rare. The plant hardiness zone ranges from 9a to 10a.
