= Friability =

Property of materials which break into smaller pieces when rubbed

In materials science, friability (/ˌfraɪ.əˈbɪləti/ FRY-ə-BIL-ə-tee), the condition of being friable, is the tendency of a solid substance to break into smaller pieces under stress or contact, especially by rubbing. The opposite of friable is indurate.

Substances that are designated hazardous, such as asbestos and crystalline silica, are often said to be friable if small particles are easily dislodged and become airborne, and hence respirable (able to enter human lungs), thereby posing a health hazard.

Tougher substances, such as concrete, may also be mechanically ground down and reduced to finely divided mineral dust. However, such substances are not generally considered friable because of the degree of difficulty involved in breaking the substance's chemical bonds through mechanical means. Some substances, such as polyurethane foams, show an increase in friability with exposure to ultraviolet radiation, as in sunlight.

Friable is sometimes used metaphorically to describe "brittle" personalities who can be "rubbed" by seemingly-minor stimuli to produce extreme emotional responses.

== General ==
A friable substance is any substance that can be reduced to fibers or finer particles by the action of a small amount of pressure or friction, such as rubbing or inadvertently brushing up against the substance. The term could also apply to any material that exhibits these properties, such as:

- Ionically bound substances that are less than 1 kg/L in density
- Clay tablets
- Crackers
- Mineral fibers
- Polyurethane (foam)
- Aerogel

== Geological ==
Friable and indurated are terms used commonly in soft-rock geology, especially with sandstones, mudstones, and shales to describe how well the component rock fragments are held together.

Examples:

- Clumps of dried clay
- Chalk
- Perlite

== Medical ==
The term friable is also used to describe tumors in medicine. This is an important determination because tumors that are easily torn apart have a higher risk of malignancy and metastasis.

Examples:

- Some forms of cancer, such as atrial myxoma
- An inflamed gallbladder

== Pharmaceutical ==
Friability testing is a laboratory technique used by the pharmaceutical industry to test the durability of tablets during transit. This testing involves repeatedly dropping a sample of tablets over a fixed time, using a rotating wheel with a baffle. The result is inspected for broken tablets, and the percentage of tablet mass lost through chipping. A typical specification will allow a non-zero percentage of chipping, and zero broken tablets.

== See also ==
- Asbestos abatement
- Frangibility
- Spall
