= West Sonoma Coast AVA =

American Viticultural Area in Sonoma County, California

Coordinates: 38°41′55″N 123°20′16″W

West Sonoma Coast
- Wine region
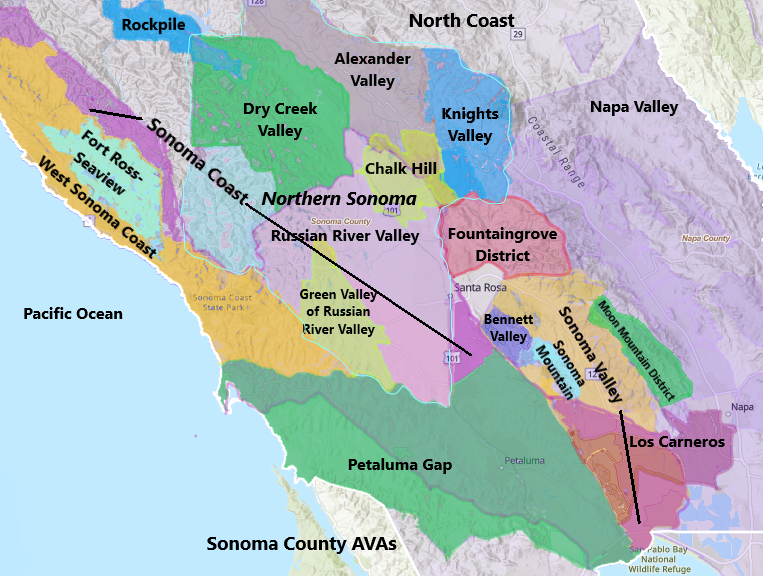
- Type: American Viticultural Area
- Year established: 2022
- Years of wine industry: 209
- Country: United States
- Part of: California, North Coast AVA, Sonoma County, Sonoma Coast AVA
- Other regions in California, North Coast AVA, Sonoma County, Sonoma Coast AVA: Chalk Hill AVA, Los Carneros AVA, Petaluma Gap AVA, Russian River Valley AVA, Green Valley of Russian River Valley AVA, Sonoma Valley AVA
- Sub-regions: Fort Ross-Seaview AVA
- Growing season: 264 days
- Climate region: Region Ib
- Heat units: 2,185 GDD units
- Precipitation (annual average): 2 to 4 in (50–100 mm)
- Soil conditions: fine clay or loamy alfisols and inceptisols
- Total area: 141,846 acres (222 sq mi)
- Size of planted vineyards: 1,028 acres (416 ha)
- No. of vineyards: 47
- Grapes produced: Chardonnay, Marsanne, Pinot Noir, Roussanne, Syrah, Viognier, Zinfindel

West Sonoma Coast is an American Viticultural Area (AVA) located in portions of Sonoma County, California. It was established as the nation's 262^{nd}, the state's 144^{th} and the county's nineteenth appellation on May 23, 2022 by the Alcohol and Tobacco Tax and Trade Bureau (TTB), Treasury after reviewing the petition submitted by Patrick L. Shabram, on behalf of the West Sonoma Coast Vintners Association, proposing a viticultural area named "West Sonoma Coast." The AVA encompasses 141,846 acres (222 sq mi) with approximately 47 commercial vineyards cultivating about 1,028 acres (416 ha) throughout an area largely located within the Marine zone climate classification including the established Fort Ross-Seaview viticultural area.

== History ==
Viticulture in the Sonoma coastal area is thought to be the first in what is today the North Coast AVA. Vitis vinefera vines may have been planted as early as 1817 according to historian Charles L Sullivan. These vines were planted by Russian settlers looking to establish agricultural outposts in the Fort Ross vicinity. Vines were reported to be bearing fruit in 1823. By the 1880s, vines were established and wine was commercially produced in several places throughout western Sonoma County, including, but not limited to, the areas around Freestone and Occidental, Bodega, Forestville, Guerneville, and Cazadero. Steve Heimoff, a wine writer, further notes ten acres (4 ha) of vineyard "at Plantation above Fort Ross Road, northwest of Cazadero." Most of the western Sonoma County wine industry did not survive phylloxera outbreaks and Prohibition. Lemoral Winery near Occidental, built in 1903, was in operation until the 1960s.

It was not until the 1970s that the Sonoma coastal area experienced a rebound, starting with Michael Bohan who took a chance and planted one acre of Zinfindel on his generational family sheep ranch in 1972. In 1974, he planted another 15 acres, and, in 1976, he started selling his grape harvests to wineries in Sonoma and Santa Cruz Counties, California. In 1973, several other growers started operations in the local area, including Precious Mountain Vineyards in Fort Ross-Seaview. Dr. John Young and his daughter, Joan Young Zeller, are believed to have planted grapes on Taylor Lane near Occidental in 1977, while wine grape vines in what was to become Annapolis Winery were planted 1978. Sea Ridge Winery was established in Fort Ross-Seaview in 1979 and became the destination for many of these earliest coast grape plantings, especially in the Fort Ross-Seaview area. Additional plantings took place throughout the 1980s and 1990s. Mr. Sullivan credits a "growing interest in wines with a Burgundian style and flavor" as a catalyst for westward movement to the extreme coastal environments. By 1999, growers in Fort Ross-Seaview were exploring the possibility of establishing an AVA and commissioned Patrick Shabram, a geographer and author of this petition, to study the geography of the area. A petition was submitted in 2003 to the Bureau of Alcohol, Tobacco and Firearms (ATF) to establish the Fort Ross-Seaview AVA. Approval of the AVA was delayed for several reasons, including an interest by other growers in the overall Sonoma coastal region to establish an AVA that distinguishes it independent within the expansive Sonoma Coast AVA. The Fort Ross Seaview AVA was established in 2011, but growers in the area, including growers in Fort Ross-Seaview continued to organize efforts to distinguish the coastal Sonoma viticulture.

== Name Evidence ==
The name "West Sonoma Coast" was used to distinguish the Pacific coastal areas of Sonoma County from the oversized Sonoma Coast AVA. As areas closer to the Pacific Ocean are more traditionally referred to as "Sonoma Coast" (in other words, coastal Sonoma County), residents and growers have found the Sonoma Coast AVA generating confusion between the area traditionally known as the Sonoma Coast, the interior of the county, and areas of Sonoma County adjacent to San Pablo Bay. As such, growers in the area have adopted various names to distinguish the geographic difference between the Sonoma Coast AVA and the actual Sonoma coast. Among the terms used were "True Coast," "True Sonoma Coast," "Far Coast," "Sonoma Coastal Mountains," "Sonoma Coastal Ridges," and "West Sonoma Coast." The most common and geographically descriptive term with the greatest viticultural significance is the name "West Sonoma Coast." Outside of viticulture, "Sonoma Coast" is the most common moniker used in marketing of businesses, real estate brochures, media and books, etc. to identify the coastal communities and rural areas of Sonoma County, but this name cannot be used to distinguish coastal areas of the county because of the existing Sonoma Coast AVA, which includes areas not considered coastal Sonoma County. "West Sonoma Coast" offers the best descriptive delineation given the limitations of being able to use the most appropriate identifier. "West" as a modifier to distinguish the westernmost stretches of Sonoma County is common both inside and outside the wine industry. Local monikers using "West" include "West County," "West Sonoma County," "Western Sonoma," and "West Sonoma" in addition to West Sonoma Coast. The local newspaper for Sebastopol and areas west of Sebastopol is the Sonoma West Times and News, and much of the proposed AVA is within the West Sonoma County Unified School District. Steve Heimoff describes the area as "western Sonoma" along with other terms including "Sonoma coast" and "West County" in his book A Wine Journey along the Russian River. He also refers to residents of the area as "West Sonomans", while "Western Sonoma," "Sonoma coast," "West County," and "West Sonoman(s)" are reference at several locations in the book. "West County" is too common and too generic to offer viticultural significance to a specific region, while "West Sonoma County" is too broad to be specific to the coast region of the county. Hence, "West Sonoma Coast" is the most accurate and precise geographic description, under the limitations that preclude using "Sonoma Coast" for this proposed AVA. In 2010, the West Sonoma Coast Vintners was created, an association of western Sonoma County growers and wineries. The purpose of the West Sonoma Coast Vintners is to "preserve and protect the history, landscape, and culture of the West Sonoma Coast, and to promote the region's wines."

Despite the variety of names in use, the name "West Sonoma Coast" emerged as the most commonly used within the wine industry to specifically identify coastal Sonoma County. The name "West Sonoma Coast" is known both locally, as reflected by the West Sonoma Coast Vintners noted above and a number of local vineyards in the area, and nationally as noted by a number of media sources. Peay Vineyards highlights their "Pinot Noir, Syrah, and Chardonnay from our estate vineyard on the West Sonoma Coast," and Red Car Winery notes "Red Car is a West Sonoma Coast winery specializing in cold climate Pinot Noir, Chardonnay and Syrah." A number of other wineries and vineyards make note of their West Sonoma Coast location. Examples of national media sources referencing the name include The Wall Street Journal, which writes "It's only in the last 20 years or so that the West Sonoma Coast has been recognized as a superb region for Burgundian varietals of Pinot Noir and Chardonnay." Forbes refers to the area as the "Western Sonoma Coast" in its article. In Wine & Spirits Magazine, Elaine Chukan Brown discusses "the region unofficially known as 'west Sonoma Coast.'"

After careful review of the public comments and the name evidence provided in the petition, TTB determined that there is sufficient evidence to support the proposed West Sonoma Coast AVA name. The petition provided ample evidence that the term "West Sonoma" is used to describe the entire western portion of Sonoma County, where the proposed AVA is located. No known usage of the name "West Sonoma Coast" is found outside Sonoma County, and no usage for the name is found in the Geographic Names Information System (GNIS) of the USGS Board on Geographic Names.

== Terroir ==
=== Topography ===
The distinguishing features of West Sonoma Coast viticultural area include its topography, geology, and climate. The topography is characterized by the steep, rugged mountains and ridgelines that form the Coastal Ranges where the summits can exceed 1,000 feet (300 m). The high elevations of the Coastal Ranges provide areas for vineyards that are above the fog layer. The ridgelines also create areas at lower elevations that are sheltered from the heaviest marine fogs, where viticulture may take place successfully within the fog line. The petition states that examples of such protected regions within the AVA include the areas around Freestone, Annapolis, and Occidental. The high elevations within the AVA also allow for vineyards to be placed above the fog. The petition states that the established Fort Ross-Seaview AVA, in particular, benefits from elevations above the fog line. Commercial viticulture would likely not occur within the AVA without protection from the extreme marine influences, either in the form of elevations above the fog line or lower elevations sheltered by the ridgelines, because the cold temperatures and reduced sunlight caused by heavy marine fog would not allow grapes to ripen reliably. By contrast, the region to the east of the AVA, within the Russian River Valley AVA, is generally lower and the slopes are less steep, particularly in the Santa Rosa Plain. To the south, within the Petaluma Gap AVA, the topography is characterized by gentle, rolling hills with lower elevations.

=== Climate ===
Lastly, the West Sonoma Coast AVA has a climate that is more influenced by marine winds and fog than the more inland regions of Sonoma County. Much of the proposed AVA is located within the Marine zone climate classification, and gradually transitions to the Coastal Cool zone. Within the AVA, daytime temperatures are generally cooler and nighttime temperatures are generally warmer than in the more inland regions. Growing degree day (GDD) accumulations within the AVA are typically lower than within the region to the east. Wind speeds within the West Sonoma AVA are lower than within the region to the south, where lower elevations allow the coastal winds to enter relatively unhindered. According to the petition, higher wind speeds can slow photosynthesis, thereby slowing fruit development and maturation. The petition also states that the climate of the AVA is suitable for growing cooler climate varietals of grapes such as Pinot Noir and Chardonnay.

=== Soil ===
The coastal mountains of Sonoma County are marked by a variety of geologic formations created through accretion resulting from the subduction of the former Farallon Plate under the North American Plate. West of the San Andreas Fault, strike-slip faulting has caused offset of geological materials. Especially predominant are the German Rancho Formation and the Gualala Formation, also characterized by sedimentary rock. Much of the West Sonoma Coast AVA is underlain with sedimentary rocks of the Franciscan Complex. The Franciscan Complex is not easily eroded, which contributes to the high elevations and steep slopes within the area. Soils derived from the Franciscan Complex are typically thin and have a high sand content, which promotes good drainage in vineyards. To the east and south of the AVA, the Franciscan Complex is present, but the Wilson Grove Formation is the dominant geological feature. To the east of the AVA, alluvial soils are also more common.

== Viticulture ==
The initial steps toward establishing a viticultural area began in 2011, after a small group of local growers and vintners formed the West Sonoma Coast Vintners Association. They were frustrated by what they viewed as the vague and inattentive Sonoma Coast AVA where its vast 500,000 acres (202,343 ha) encompasses the western Sonoma coast and also includes inland areas like Los Carneros that are relatively far from the ocean. The coastal vineyards these vintners maintain, can be 10 °F (−12 °C) degrees cooler than vineyards in other parts of the Sonoma Coast AVA. They perceived, that other wineries were able to cash in on the cachet the "Sonoma Coast" name had earned based on the quality of coastal vintages, but they did not produce particularly coastal influenced wines. "There was that sense that a wrong had been done years ago when the Sonoma Coast AVA was made so large," claimed a vineyard owner.
Therefore, these vintners wanted to clearly delineate that their grapes were produced on the literal Sonoma coast where their vineyards are influenced entirely by the Pacific Ocean, whether located on the high ridgelines of Fort-Ross Seaview, in the remote stretches of Annapolis, or in the fog-shrouded forests of Freestone and Occidental. The West Sonoma Coast Vintners Association currently comprises 40 growers and wineries, representing nearly the entire West Sonoma Coast wine industry such as Hirsch Vineyard, Waterhorse Ridge Vineyard, Alma Fria, Ceritas, Porter Bass Vineyard, B.A. Thieriot Vineyard, Failla and Peay Vineyards.
