= Sonoma County wine =

Wine made in Sonoma County, California

Sonoma County
- Wine region
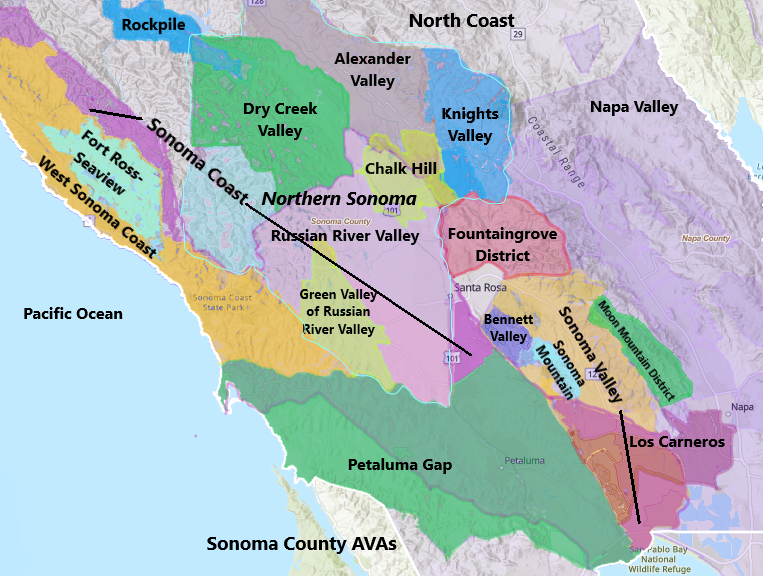
- Sonoma County AVAs
- Type: U.S. County Appellation
- Year established: 1850
- Years of wine industry: 169
- Country: United States
- Part of: California, North Coast AVA
- Other regions in California, North Coast AVA: Napa County, Mendocino County, Lake County
- Sub-regions: Alexander Valley AVA, Bennett Valley AVA, Chalk Hill AVA, Dry Creek Valley AVA, Fort Ross-Seaview AVA, Fountaingrove District AVA, Green Valley of Russian River Valley AVA, Knights Valley AVA, Los Carneros AVA, Moon Mountain District Sonoma County AVA, Northern Sonoma AVA, Petaluma Gap AVA, Pine Mountain-Cloverdale Peak AVA, Rockpile AVA, Russian River Valley AVA, Sonoma Coast AVA, Sonoma Mountain AVA, Sonoma Valley AVA, West Sonoma Coast AVA
- Total area: 1.14 million acres (1,786 sq mi)
- Size of planted vineyards: 397,821 acres (160,992 ha)
- Grapes produced: Barbera, Cabernet Franc, Cabernet Sauvignon, Carignane, Chardonnay, Chenin blanc, Cinsault, Gamay noir, Gewürztraminer, Grenache, Malbec, Merlot, Mourvedre, Muscat Canelli, Petit Verdot, Petite Sirah, Pinot blanc, Pinot gris, Pinot Meunier, Pinot noir, Riesling, Roussanne, Sangiovese, Sauvignon blanc, Sauvignon Musque, Sémillon, Syrah, Tempranillo, Tinta Cao, Touriga Nacional, Viognier, Zinfandel
- No. of wineries: 495

Sonoma County wine refers to the viticulture and winemaking in Sonoma County, California, United States. County names in the United States automatically qualify as legal appellations of origin for wine produced from grapes grown in that county and do not require registration with the Alcohol and Tobacco Tax and Trade Bureau (TTB) of the Treasury Department. TTB was created in January 2003, when the Bureau of Alcohol, Tobacco and Firearms, or ATF, was extensively reorganized under the provisions of the Homeland Security Act of 2002.

Sonoma County is one of California's largest producers of wine grapes, far outproducing the Napa Valley AVA.

== History ==
In the early 1800s, two competing groups of different nationalities were settling in Sonoma County: Russian explorers based at Fort Ross on the coast and Spanish settlers moving north from San Francisco. Around 1834 General Mariano Vallejo, military Governor of Mexican California, was sent to take control of the territory above San Francisco and block further expansion by the Russians. He founded the town of Sonoma, and was granted Rancho Petaluma by Governor José Figueroa. Generous land grants made by Vallejo in this connection greatly expedited the settlement of Sonoma County in the areas of Santa Rosa, Healdsburg, and Kenwood. One of these grants, a portion of Santa Rosa township encompassing a relatively small area southeast of the city of Santa Rosa, was known as "Yulupa." The boundaries of the Yulupa land grant coincide very closely with, and entirely contain, the area now known as Bennett Valley.
Viticulture in the Sonoma area is thought to be the first in what is today the North Coast AVA. Vitis vinefera vines may have been planted as early as 1817 according to historian Charles L Sullivan. These vines were planted by the Russians in the Fort Ross vicinity where vines were reported to be bearing fruit in 1823. Padre Jose Altimira planted several thousand grape vines at Mission San Francisco Solano in what is now the city of Sonoma, in southern Sonoma County. Cuttings from the Sonoma mission vineyards were carried throughout northern California to start new vineyards. By the time of the Bear Flag Revolt in Sonoma and the subsequent annexation of California by the United States in 1854, viticulture was an established part of agriculture in the region. The vineyards of General Vallejo were producing an annual income of $20,000 at that time. The grapes planted would not be considered premium varieties today.

In 1855, a Hungarian named Agoston Haraszthy arrived in Sonoma Valley. Upon his arrival, he purchased the Salvador Vallejo vineyard, which he then renamed it Buena Vista. Commissioned in 1861 by the California legislature to study viticulture in Europe, he returned with more than 100,000 cuttings of premium grape varieties. Many of the immigrants to the area were Northern Italian or from other wine-growing regions of Europe. After the Civil War and before Prohibition, wineries such as Bundschu, Foppiano, Korbel, Simi, Gundlach, Quitzow and Sebastiani were established that still exist. By the 1880's, vines were established and wine was commercially produced in several places throughout western Sonoma County, including, but not limited to, the areas around Freestone and Occidental, Bodega, Forestville, Guerneville, and Cazadero. Steve Heimoff, a wine writer, further notes ten acres (4 ha) of vineyard "at Plantation above Fort Ross Road, northwest of Cazadero." In the 1920s there were 256 wineries in Sonoma County, with more than 22,000 acres (8,903 ha) in production. Most of the western Sonoma County wine industry did not survive phylloxera outbreaks and Prohibition. At the Repeal of Prohibition in 1933, fewer than 50 wineries in Sonoma County survived. Lemoral Winery near Occidental, built in 1903, was in operation until the 1960's. Even as late as the 1960s, only 12,000 acres (4,900 ha) were vineyards. But wine consumption in America began to grow, and by 1999 Sonoma County had over 49,000 acres (20,000 ha) of vineyards owned by more than 750 growers and 180 bonded wineries. Of the 250 wineries existing in 2007, over half are less than 20 years old.

During the 2019 Kincade Fire, some wineries and vineyards experienced a week of intense heat, smoke and evacuation-caused neglect of newly fermenting wine.

== Winemaking ==
In 2004, growers harvested 165,783 tons (150,396 tonnes) of wine grapes worth US$310 million. In 2006 the Sonoma County grape harvest amounted to 216,000 tons, worth $430 million. About 73% of Sonoma County's agricultural production is growing wine grapes—60,302 acres (24,403 ha) of vineyards, with over 1100 growers. The most common varieties planted are Chardonnay, Cabernet Sauvignon, and Pinot noir, though the area is also known for its Merlot and Zinfandel.

== Appellations ==
Sonoma County, California

Sonoma County's large number (19) of American Viticulture Areas (AVAs) reflect the wide variety of climate and soil conditions in the County, the large production in the County, and the prominence of Sonoma County in the wine market. The difference in climate and soil (terroir), means that cooler climate grapes grow well in certain regions and in others warm climate grapes are more suitable. The large production of the County means that each AVA is significant in its own right.

The prominence of the California wine industry and Sonoma County in particular has established worldwide recognition of their wine regions. At the same time, many consumers have been confused by the many different AVAs within Sonoma County. The growers voted in 2006 to form a Sonoma County Winegrape Commission, representing more than 1,800 growers. The Commission seeks to raise recognition for Sonoma County and encourages all wine from the county to bear the mark "Sonoma County" on it.

The following are appellations in Sonoma County:

=== Alexander Valley ===
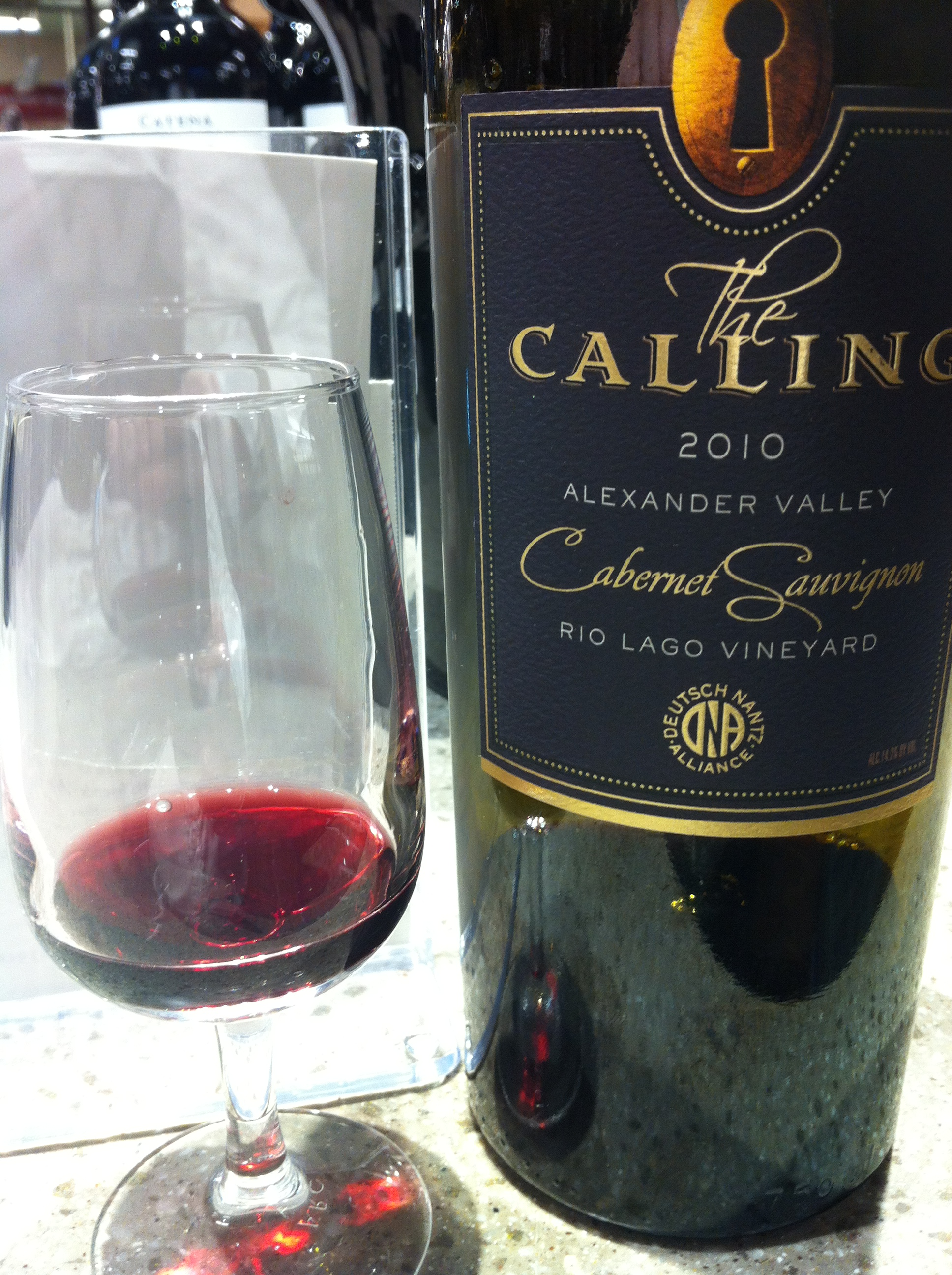
A Cabernet Sauvignon from Alexander Valley

The Alexander Valley AVA is one of the most densely planted of all of Sonoma County's AVAs. Located along the Russian River, the boundary of this appellation extends north of Healdsburg up to Mendocino County north of Cloverdale. Viticulture has existed in the area since the 1850s but the wine industry has only fairly recently experienced success beginning in the 1960s with Simi Winery. Significant purchases of vineyard land by E & J Gallo Winery in 1988 and Kendall-Jackson in 1996 also raised the profile of the Alexander Valley. The profile of Alexander Valley wines has historically centered around the approachability and richness of the wines with Cabernet Sauvignon being noted for characteristic chocolate notes and warm mouthfeel. After Cabernet, Chardonnay is one of the leading variety plantings followed by Sauvignon blanc and Zinfandel.

=== Bennett Valley ===
The Bennett Valley AVA is one of Sonoma County's newest AVAs and is a principal grape supplier to Kendall-Jackson. The AVA is surrounded to the south, east and west by the Sonoma Mountains and to the north by the city of Santa Rosa. The region receives a moderating effect on its climate from Pacific Ocean through the cool coastal fogs and breeze that creep into the area from the southwest through Crane Canyon between Sonoma Mountain and Taylor Mountain.

=== Chalk Hill ===
The Chalk Hill AVA is a sub-appellation of the Russian River Valley located near the town of Windsor along the foothills at the southern end of Alexander Valley and along the Santa Rosa plain. The name Chalk Hill comes from the unique volcanic soil of chalky white ash which has shown itself to perform well with planting of white wine varieties like Chardonnay and Sauvignon blanc. The majority of the region's wineries are located on the western slopes of the Mayacamas Mountains.

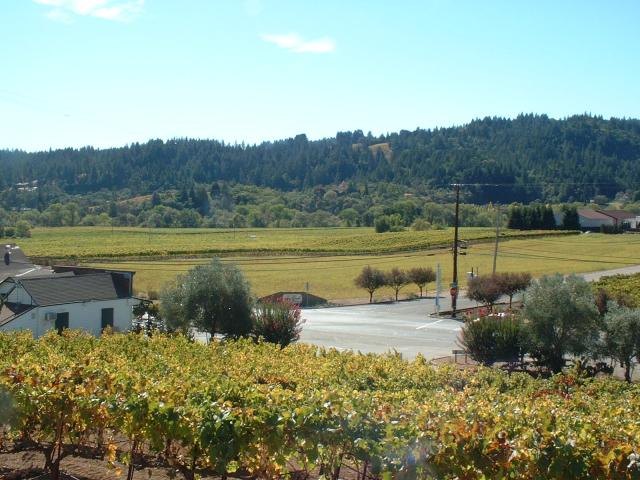
Dry Creek Valley vineyard

=== Dry Creek Valley ===
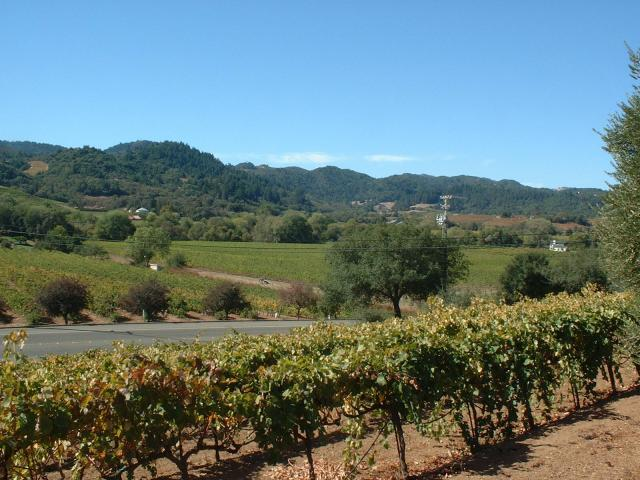
Teldeschi Winery in the Dry Creek Valley

Dry Creek Valley AVA in the Russian River Valley centers around Dry Creek, a tributary of the Russian River, and is approximately 16 miles (25.7 km) long and 2 miles (3.2 km) wide. The appellation is known particularly for its Sauvignon Blanc and Zinfandel production. Dry Creek Valley is home to the majority of the Sonoma Gallo vineyards, who established winery facilities in the valley in the early 1990s.

=== Fort Ross-Seaview ===
The 27,500-acre (43 sq mi) Fort Ross-Seaview AVA is located in the western part of Sonoma County and contains 18 commercial vineyards cultivating 506 acres (205 ha). It lies entirely within the Sonoma Coast AVA and does not overlap other AVAs. Vineyards within this area are generally located on rounded ridges with summits extending above 1,200 ft (370 m) consisting of steep, mountainous terrain made up of canyons, narrow valleys, ridges, and 800-to-1,800-foot (240–550 m) peaks. In areas above 900 feet (270 m) in elevation, the climate is influenced by longer periods of sunlight and is warmer than the surrounding lower landscape.

=== Fountaingrove District ===
Fountaingrove District AVA, established in 2015, encompasses 38,000 acres (59 sq mi) in the eastern boundaries of Sonoma County. It is home to over 600 acres (240 ha) of hillside vineyards with elevations reaching up to 2,000 feet (610 m). The region is best known for its Cabernet Sauvignon, Merlot and Syrah varietals.

=== Green Valley of Russian River Valley ===
Green Valley of Russian River Valley AVA was formerly known as the Sonoma County Green Valley AVA. Located at the southwestern corner of the Russian River Valley AVA, its close proximity to the Pacific Ocean makes it one of the coolest appellations within Sonoma County. The climate in the Green Valley is even cooler than other parts of the Russian River Valley, and favors the cultivation of cool climate grape varieties. Seeking to connect the region with the more commercially successful Russian River Valley name, the appellation formally changed its name on April 23, 2007.

=== Knights Valley ===
Knights Valley AVA occupies the boundaries between the southern end of the Alexander Valley AVA and the northern end of Napa Valley. Some of the earliest vineyards in the area was owned by Beringer Vineyards. The area is known for its Cabernet Sauvignon.

=== Los Carneros ===
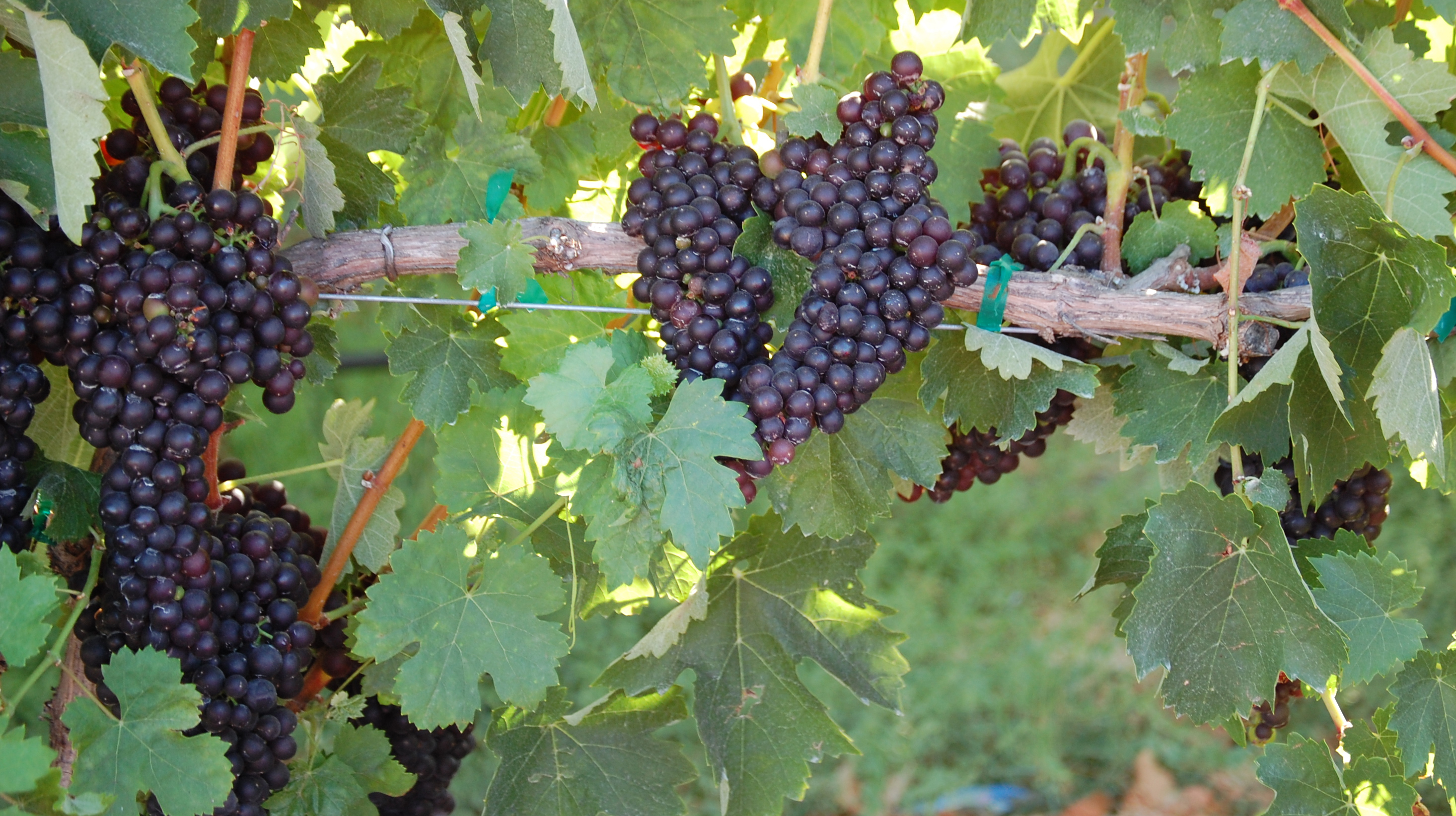
Grapes growing along State Route 12

Los Carneros AVA spans the last, low hills of the Mayacamas Mountains dividing both Napa and Sonoma Valleys just north of San Pablo Bay. The larger portion of the AVA stretches into Sonoma County with grapes grown here also being allowed to use the Sonoma Valley AVA designation. The area's close proximity to the Bay has made it an ideal location for Pinot noir and Chardonnay production with producers from international Champagne houses such as Moët et Chandon (Domaine Chandon California), Taittinger (Domaine Carneros), and Cava producers planting vineyards or sourcing grapes from the area.

=== Moon Mountain District Sonoma County ===
Moon Mountain District Sonoma County AVA, established by the TTB in 2013, is a sub-appellation of the Sonoma Valley AVA and shares an eastern border with Mt. Veeder AVA, a sub-appellation of Napa Valley.

=== Northern Sonoma ===
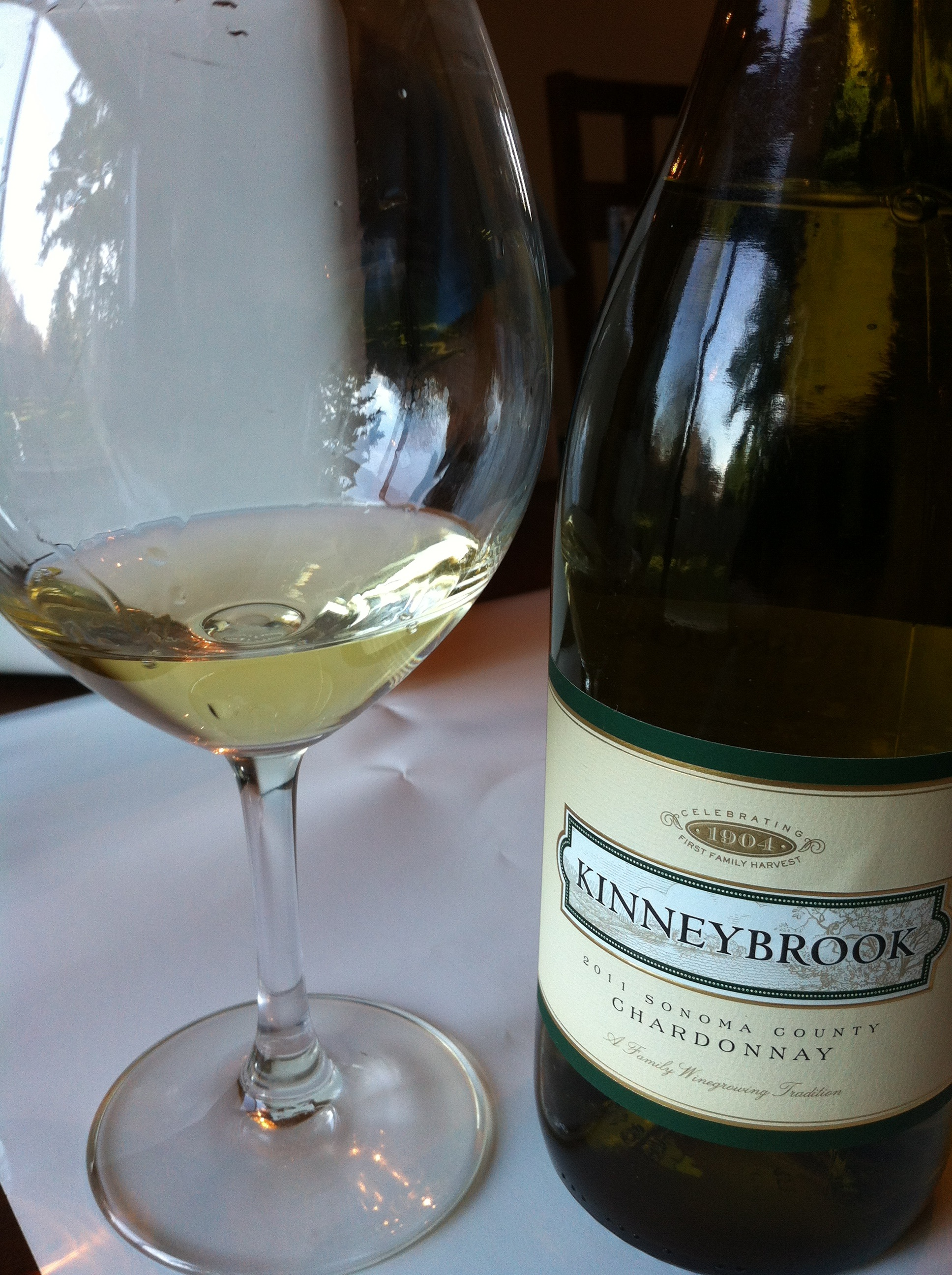
A Chardonnay from Sonoma County

The Northern Sonoma AVA is an all encompassing appellation that covers all of Sonoma County with the exception of the Sonoma Valley and some areas of the Petaluma River watershed. The AVA was proposed by E & J Gallo to accommodate wines made from a blend of grapes from scattered vineyards in Sonoma County.

=== Petaluma Gap ===
The Petaluma Gap was approved in December 2017 and takes its name from the geographic feature which allows cool ocean air currents to flow into the valley. These winds, combined with the influence of San Pablo Bay, make the region ideal for Pinot noir, Chardonnay and Syrah.

=== Pine Mountain-Cloverdale Peak ===
The Pine Mountain-Cloverdale Peak AVA is one of the highest elevation grape-growing regions in California. The AVA, which rises from 1,600 feet at its lowest point to 3,000 feet at the mountain's peak, has grapes growing primarily at 1,800 feet and higher. The very high elevation of the mountain affects fog cover, hours of daylight, daytime and nighttime temperatures, rainfall, and wind — virtually every climatic element influencing wine grape production.

=== Rockpile ===
The Rockpile AVA is situated at the northwest point of the Dry Creek Valley AVA, past Healdsburg. The area was first planted by Italian immigrants at the turn of the 20th century. Many of today's vineyards were formerly occupied by a reservoir created by the Warm Springs Dam on the Russian River. The area is known for its fruity, ripe Zinfandels.

=== Russian River Valley ===
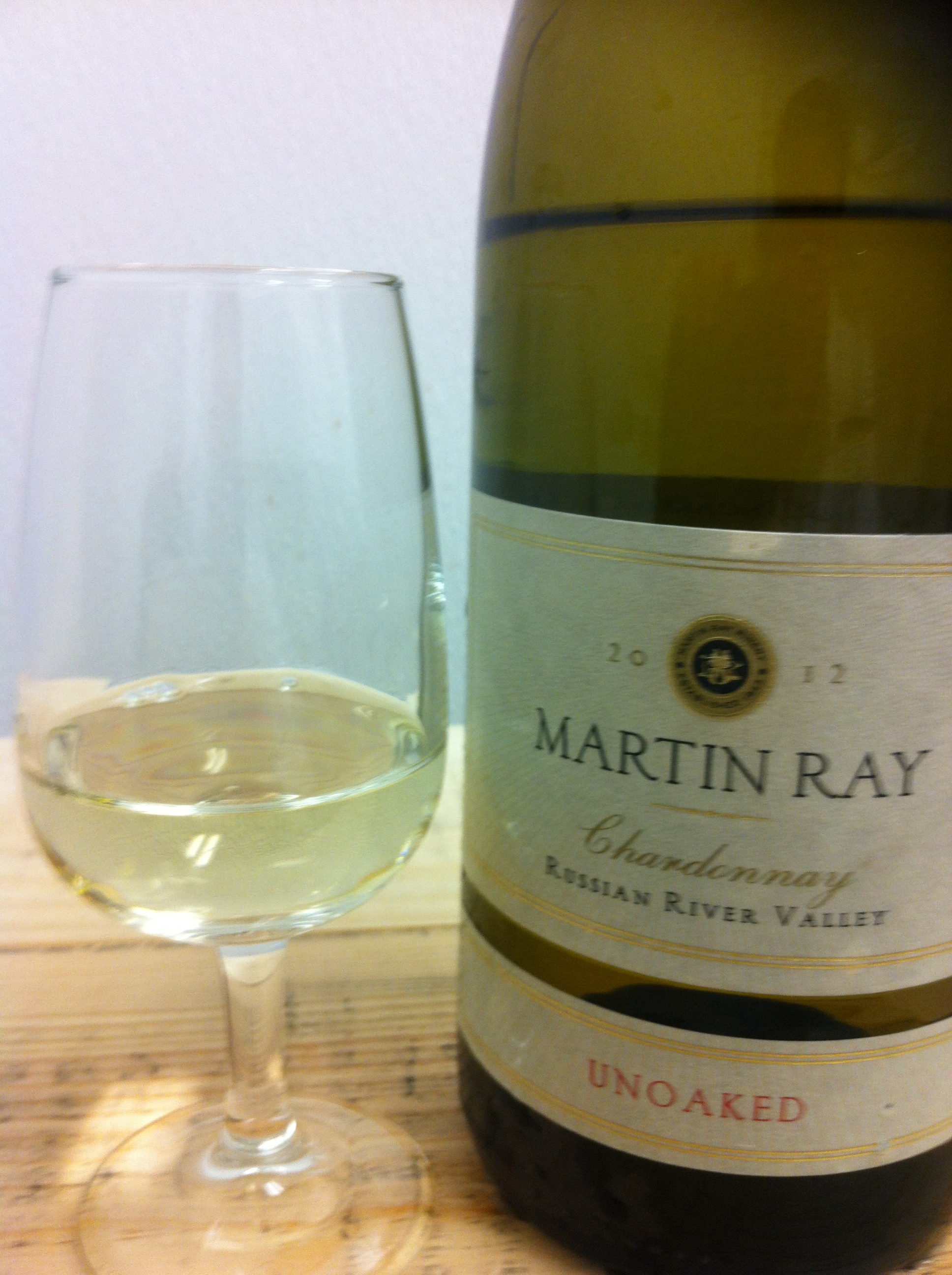
An unoaked Chardonnay from the Russian River Valley

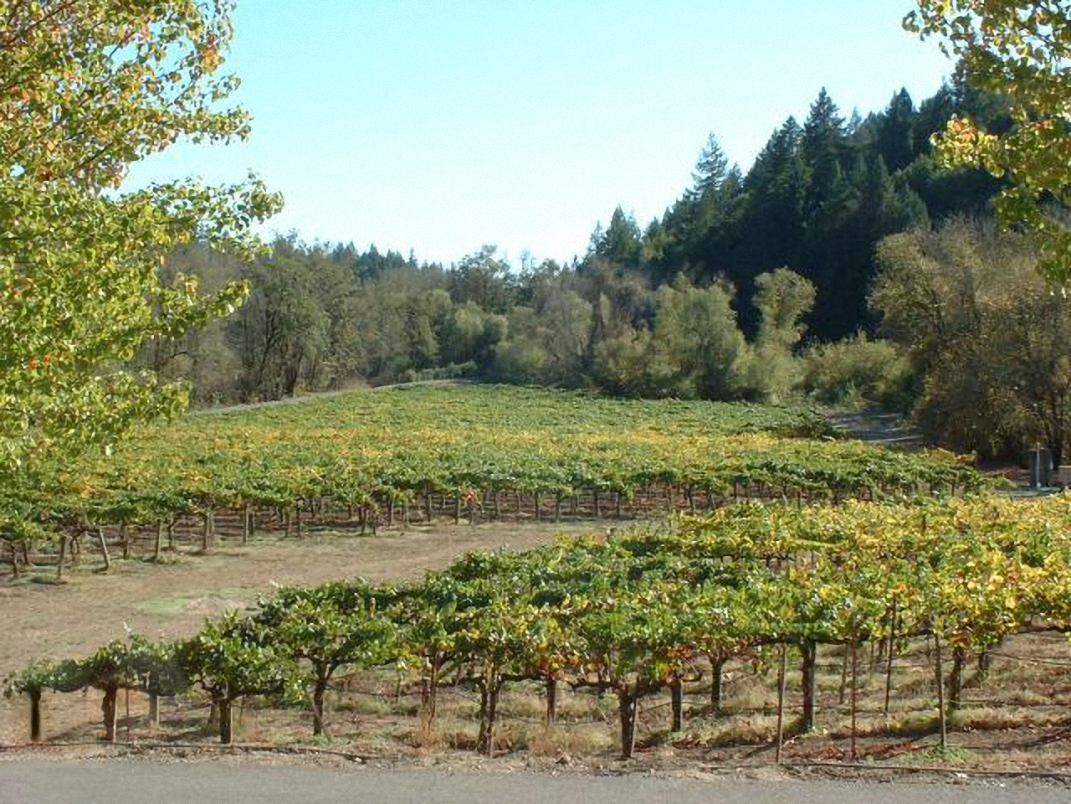
A vineyard in the Russian River Valley AVA

The Russian River Valley AVA lies adjacent to and west of the city of Santa Rosa and incorporates the southern reach of the Russian River, where the river bends westward and cuts through the Coast Range to the Pacific Ocean. The AVA is characterized by the regular intrusion of cooling fog from the coast. The fog flows through the Petaluma Wind Gap and the channel cut by the river. The fog generally arrives in the evening or early morning and retreats before noon in the day. The appellation was granted AVA status in 1983 and accounts for about one-sixth of the total planted vineyard acreage in Sonoma County. In 2005 the AVA was expanded by 30,200 acres (47.2 sq mi) to 126,600 acres (197.8 sq mi) by recognizing previously overlooked portions of the fog regions. Presently the Russian River AVA includes more than 15,000 acres (23 sq mi) planted to wine grapes. At last count, 79 wineries were listed in the Russian River Valley Winegrowers website. The area is known for its success with cool climate varieties, notably Pinot noir and Chardonnay.

=== Sonoma Coast ===
The Sonoma Coast AVA contains more than 500,000 acres (1,000 sq mi), mostly along the coastline of the Pacific Ocean. It extends from San Pablo Bay to the border with Mendocino County. The appellation is known for its cool climate and high rainfall relative to other parts of Sonoma County. Pinot noir grapes grow especially well in this region, where they benefit from slightly cooler day temperatures.

=== Sonoma Mountain ===
The Sonoma Mountain AVA, in the Sonoma Mountains, includes the town of Glen Ellen and is bordered on the west by the Sonoma Valley AVA. The area is known for the diverse micro-climates that occur within the crevices and folds of the hillside terrain and as such is home to production for a wide range of varieties including Cabernet Sauvignon, Chardonnay, Pinot noir, Sauvignon blanc, Sémillon, and Zinfandel.

=== Sonoma Valley ===
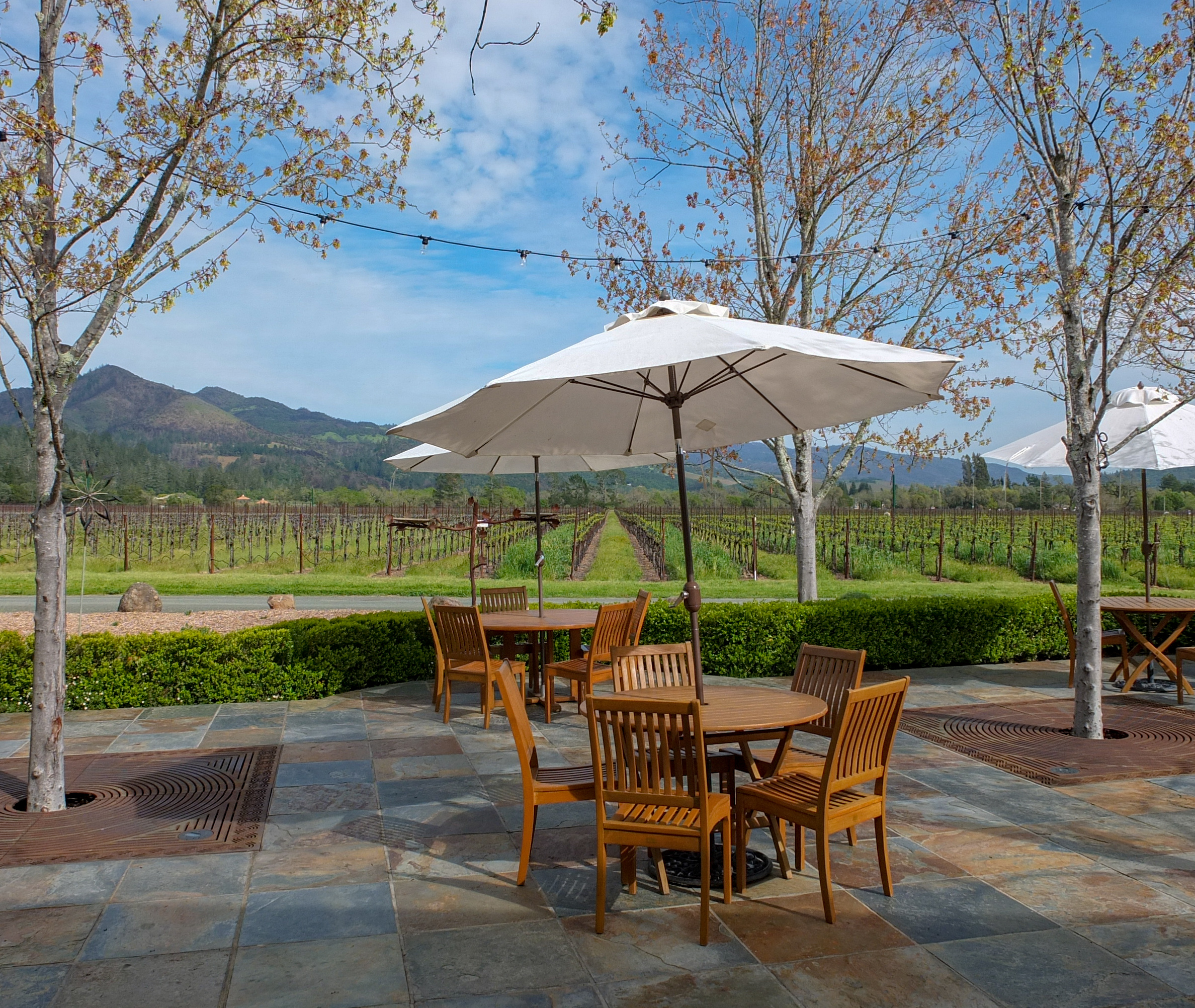
Outdoor wine tasting area at St. Francis Winery & Vineyards

The Sonoma Valley AVA is known for its unique terroir with Sonoma Mountain protecting the area from the wet and cool influence of the nearby Pacific Ocean. The Sonoma Mountains to the west help protect the valley from excessive rainfall. The cool air that does affect the region comes northward from San Pablo Bay through the Carneros region and southward from the Santa Rosa plain. Sonoma Valley has played a significant role in the history of California wine.

=== West Sonoma Coast ===
The county's newest appellation was created to distinguish the Pacific coastal areas of Sonoma County from the oversized Sonoma Coast AVA. As areas closer to the Pacific Ocean are more traditionally referred to as "Sonoma Coast" (in other words, coastal Sonoma County), residents and growers have found the Sonoma Coast AVA generating confusion between the area traditionally known as the Sonoma Coast, the interior of the county, and areas of Sonoma County adjacent to San Pablo Bay. Its topography is characterized by the steep, rugged mountains and ridgelines that form the Coastal Ranges where the summits can exceed 1,000 feet (300 m). The high elevations of the Coastal Ranges provide areas for vineyards that are above the fog layer.

== Notable wineries ==
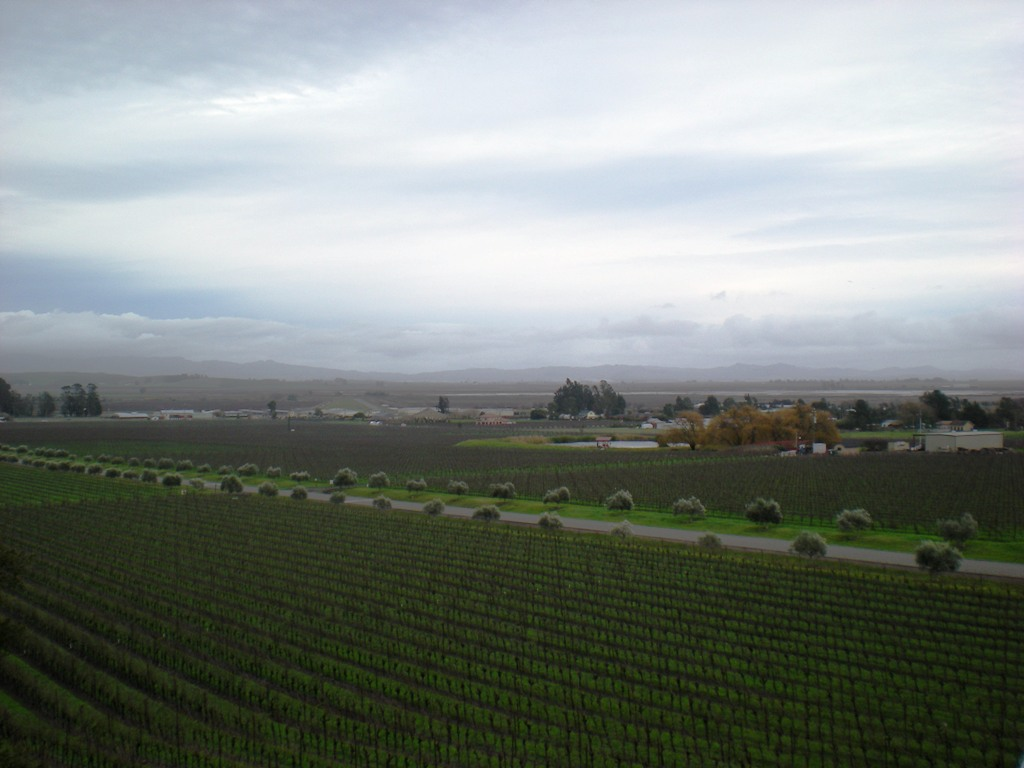
The view of Sonoma Valley from Gloria Ferrer

- B. R. Cohn Winery
- Charles Creek Vineyard
- Cline Cellars
- D'Agostini Winery
- De Loach Vineyards
- Gloria Ferrer
- Kendall-Jackson Winery
- Kenwood Vineyards
- Kistler Vineyards
- Korbel Champagne Cellars
- Remick Ridge Vineyards

== See also ==
- Lake County wine
- Mendocino County wine
- Napa County wine
- Wine Country (California)
