= Fountaingrove District AVA =

American Viticultural Area in Sonoma County, California

Coordinates: 38°29′42″N 122°43′25″W

Fountaingrove District
- Wine region
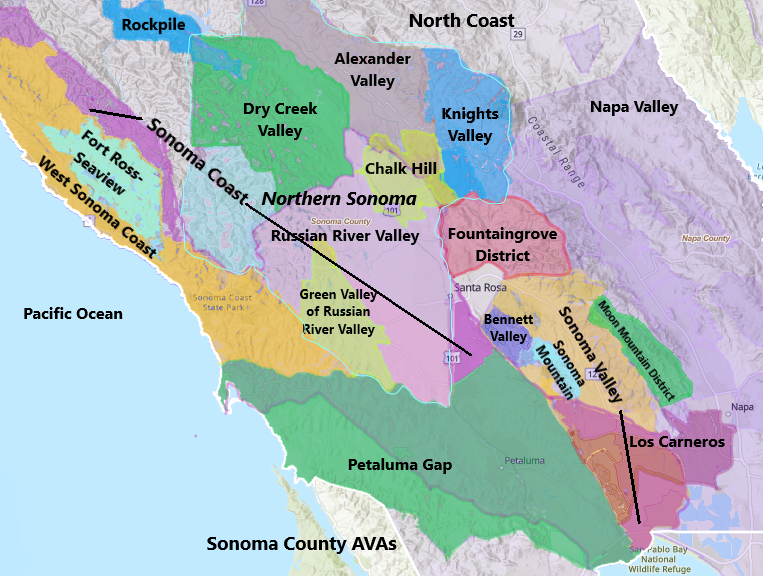
- Type: American Viticultural Area
- Year established: 2015
- Years of wine industry: 151
- Country: United States
- Part of: California, North Coast AVA, Sonoma County
- Other regions in California, North Coast AVA, Sonoma County: Sonoma Valley AVA, Northern Sonoma AVA, Rockpile AVA, Sonoma Coast AVA
- Growing season: 258 days
- Climate region: Warm Region II
- Heat units: 1,663 GDD units
- Precipitation (annual average): 2 to 4 in (50–100 mm)
- Soil conditions: Gravelly loam derived from metamorphic rock
- Total area: 38,000 acres (59 sq mi)
- Size of planted vineyards: 500 acres (200 ha)
- No. of vineyards: 35
- Grapes produced: Cabernet Franc, Cabernet Sauvignon, Chardonnay, Sauvignon Blanc, Merlot, Sagrantino, Syrah, Viognier, Zinfandel
- No. of wineries: 5

Fountaingrove District is an American Viticultural Area (AVA) located in Sonoma County, California encircling the historic community of Fountain Grove adjacent northeast of the city of Santa Rosa. It was established as the nation's 229^{th}, as the state's 144^{th} and the county's nineteenth appellation on February 18, 2015 by the Alcohol and Tobacco Tax and Trade Bureau (TTB), Treasury after reviewing the petition submitted by Douglas Grigg of Walnut Hill Vineyards, LLC, on behalf of the Fountaingrove Appellation Committee, proposing the viticultural area named "Fountaingrove District" northeast of the city of Santa Rosa. The new appellation expands roughly 38,000 acres (59 sq mi) with approximately 35 commercially-producing vineyards cultivating about 500 acres (200 ha). Primary grape varieties grown within Fountaingrove are Cabernet Sauvignon, Chardonnay, Sauvignon Blanc, Merlot, Cabernet Franc, Zinfandel, Syrah, and Viognier.

== History ==
Fountaingrove District derives its name from the historic community of Fountain Grove, a utopian colony established northeast of Santa Rosa in 1875 by Universalist minister Thomas Lake Harris who initially bought 400 acres (1 sq mi). A few years later, Harris increased the property to 1,858 acres (3 sq mi) in the foothills two miles (3.2 km), north of Santa Rosa, to move the Brotherhood of the New Life commune from Brocton, New York. They planted wheat on the flat lands of the Santa Rosa plain, and at first used the hills for dairy farming, but by 1878, 375 acres (152 ha) of vineyards were planted to Cabernet, Pinot Noir, and Zinfandel, and 25 acres (10 ha) for table grapes as the land was termed the "Eden of the West." By 1882, Fountain Grove winery was completed producing 70,000 US gallons (260,000 L) of wine, with a capacity of 600,000 US gallons (2,300,000 L) making it one of the 10 largest wineries in California. In 1899, the famous Round Barn was completed to house 60 horses. In 1880, Harris appointed his California lieutenant, Kanaye Nagasawa, to take charge of the vineyard and winery operations and act as developer and manager of the community's 2,000 acres (810 ha) of vineyards. Nagasawa was one of the very first Japanese settlers in the US and was known as the "Grape King", with the locals referring to him as "Baron" Nagasawa. In 1900, Harris sold his interest in the vineyards and winery to Nagasawa and five other members of the commune, and by 1908, Nagasawa was the sole surviving owner of the Fountain Grove vineyards and winery. Fountain Grove survived the phylloxera plague of 1908, replanting the vineyards by 1912, and during Prohibition, he kept the vineyards and winery facilities productive by producing grape juice and cooking sherry. After the Repeal in 1933, Nagasawa changed the name of the winery and the community to "Fountaingrove" and opened a branch office in Los Angeles to distribute wine, but his plans for expansion were thwarted by his death in 1934. By then various anti-alien laws had been passed which prevented Fountaingrove from passing to Nagasawa's nephews, and the property was sold, with the new owners removing the vines for cattle ranching. In 1979, the property was sold again for development of subdivisions, office parks, and open space.

Although the original community no longer exists and the original Fountaingrove Winery remains only as a few abandoned buildings, the name "Fountaingrove" is still associated with the region of the Fountaingrove District AVA. The petition notes that several modern subdivisions within the AVA bear the "Fountaingrove" name, including Fountaingrove Ranch, Fountaingrove Village, Fountaingrove II, and the Meadows at Fountaingrove, which are all built on portions of the original Fountaingrove property and vineyards. Fountaingrove Parkway is a road that runs through the southwestern portion of the AVA. Fountaingrove Lake is a large reservoir within the AVA. Finally, the petition listed several businesses within the AVA that use the name "Fountaingrove," including Fountaingrove Inn Hotel and Conference Center, Fountaingrove Lodge Retirement Community, Fountaingrove Golf and Athletic Club, Fountaingrove Realty, Fountaingrove MedSpa, Fountaingrove Dentistry, Fountaingrove Deli, and Fountaingrove Cleaners.

== Terroir ==
=== Topography ===
Fountaingrove District is located on the western slopes of the Mayacmas Mountains, northeast of Santa Rosa. The topography consists of low rolling hills and higher, steeper mountains. Although there are some narrow floodplains along creeks, the AVA lacks the broad valley floors and floodplains that characterize several of the surrounding established AVAs. The slopes within the AVA are primarily oriented towards the southwest. Elevations range from approximately 400 to 2,200 feet (120–670 m), and all of the vineyards within Fountaingrove District are planted at elevations between 450 and 2,115 feet (137 and 645 m).
Topography affects viticulture within the AVA as the hillsides form a "thermal belt" that traps warm air, resulting in nighttime temperatures that are warmer than those of the lower, flatter valleys of the surrounding regions. The warmer temperatures reduce the risk of frost in the late spring and early fall. The southwest aspect of most of the slopes within the AVA allows vineyards to be planted where they can receive the maximum amount of sunlight and warmth. Immediately to the west of the AVA is the Russian River Valley AVA. Elevations in the region begin at approximately 600 feet (180 m) along the border shared with the Fountaingrove District and become lower and flatter southwest of the AVA, within the city of Santa Rosa. Elevations within much of the city are between 100 and 200 feet (30–61 m).
To the north of the AVA are the Chalk Hill and Knights Valley AVAs. The Chalk Hill AVA has a mountainous terrain with elevations similar to those of Fountaingrove District, but the soils within the Chalk Hill distinguish it from the AVA. The Knights Valley AVA has generally lower elevations and contains the broad, flat Knights Valley and Franz Valley. To the east of the AVA are Napa County's Calistoga, Spring Mountain District, and Diamond Mountain District AVAs, which have similar elevations and terrain. However, moving east, the mountainous topography of the Calistoga AVA quickly lowers to elevations of around 300 feet (91 m) within the broad, flat Napa Valley. The slopes of these three established AVAs primarily face northeast, compared to the southwest-facing slopes of Fountaingrove. Because these AVAs are located mostly on the lee side of the Mayacmas Mountains, they are subject to less maritime influence than the Fountaingrove District. To the south of the AVA, the Sonoma Valley AVA is marked by a long, flat valley surrounded by the Mayacmas Mountains to the east and the Sonoma Mountains to the west. The Sonoma Valley AVA receives less of the cooling marine air than Fountaingrove District because of the shielding effect of the Sonoma Mountains.

=== Climate ===
The temperature of Fountaingrove District is moderated by cool breezes from the Pacific Ocean. The breezes enter the region through a gap in the Sonoma Mountains between Taylor Mountain, located south of the city of Santa Rosa, and Redwood Hill, located north of the city. Because of the marine influence, the median growing season temperature within the AVA is 63.9 °F (17.7 °C). The petition provided the growing degree-day units (GDD units), 1 calculated in degrees Celsius (C), for 16 vineyards distributed throughout the AVA, and the petitioner determined the median number of GDD units for the entire AVA was 1,663. According to the Winkler scale, this figure places the AVA in the Warm Region II category. The petition compares the median growing season temperatures and GDD units of Fountaingrove District AVA to those of the surrounding established AVAs. Fountaingrove District AVA is generally warmer than the region to the west and cooler than the region to the east. The temperatures within the Chalk Hill AVA, north of the AVA, are similar to those in the Fountaingrove District; however, the Knights Valley AVA, which is also due north, has significantly more GDD units than the Fountaingrove District AVA because the higher hillsides of the Knights Valley AVA shelter its broad valley floor from the marine breezes. The Sonoma Valley AVA, immediately adjacent to the southern boundary of Fountaingrove District, is slightly warmer. The petition states that although the temperature differences between Fountaingrove District AVA and the surrounding regions appear slight, they do have a significant effect on viticulture. The petition included a chart grouping grape varietals by maturation times based on average growing season temperatures. Most varietals only ripen successfully (meaning they achieve desired levels of acidity, sugars, and flavors) within a 37 to 39 °F (3–4 °C) range of temperatures. As a result, cool-climate Pinot Noir grapes ripen successfully in the cooler temperatures of the neighboring Russian River Valley AVA, but do not grow reliably within the Fountaingrove District AVA, according to the petition. The petition notes that even the same varietal of grapes grown at opposite ends of the small range of "optimal" temperatures will have different characteristics. For example, Chardonnay grown in a Warm Region II area, such as Fountaingrove District AVA, will have a tropical fruit flavor, whereas Chardonnay grown in a cooler area will produce a drier, more mineral-like flavor. Likewise, Cabernet Sauvignon, one of the most commonly grown grapes in the AVA, produces a lower alcohol wine with subtle flavors when grown in a Warm Region II area, but often produces wines with higher alcohol content and riper flavors when grown in Region III and Region IV areas. Vintners consider these flavor and alcohol differences when producing and blending their wines. The USDA plant hardiness zones range from 9a to 10a.

=== Soil ===
The soils within Fountaingrove District are derived primarily from Sonoma Volcanics and Franciscan Formation bedrock. The volcanic soils include Goulding, Spreckels, Laniger, and Felta series soils, which consist of pumiceous ash-flow tuff, and Guenoc and Toomes series soils, which consist of basalt lava. These volcanic soils are described in the petition as being well-drained and having a balance of nutrients favorable for grape-growing. Soils derived from the Franciscan Complex include the Boomer and Henneke series. Henneke soils contain the mineral serpentine, which has high levels of nickel and can be toxic to grapevines unless the soil is ameliorated to lower the levels. Soils of the Boomer series have desirably high levels of iron, which is an essential element for vine growth and fruit development. The Fountaingrove District AVA has a greater diversity of soils than the surrounding AVAs. The AVA has fewer soils derived from river and terrace deposits than most of the surrounding established AVAs. The soils, consisting of river and terrace deposits, are generally not as well-drained as volcanic soils and may require artificial drainage. Compared to the surrounding regions, the AVA also has more soils that contain nickel-rich serpentine, which can be toxic to grapevines in high levels. Therefore, soils that contain serpentine must often be ameliorated in order to reduce the nickel levels so that the vines can grow.

== Viticulture ==
"Fountaingrove" is named after the historic Fountaingrove Winery, which was located within the boundaries of the AVA, and from its founding in 1875 until its demise in 1937 was one of the 10 largest wineries in California. The Fountaingrove Winery no longer exists and its namesake is not currently in use by any winery or vineyard. In 2015, there were approximately 35 vineyards cultivating about 500 acres (200 ha) in the AVA. Dry Creek Valley's Lambert Bridge Winery sources Chardonnay and Bordeaux varietals from the area, and many wineries purchase grapes from Kick Ranch, owned by Bricoleur Vineyards in Windsor. In Sonoma, Enkidu Wine's Syrah and Sauvignon Blanc, in Santa Rosa, Carol Shelton's Zinfandel and June Mountain's Sagrantino are some of the quality vintages sourced from Fountaingrove vineyards. Notable vineyards and wineries in the AVA include Aldina Vineyards, Buck Hill Vineyard-Bock Cellars, Heller Family Vineyards-H.L.R. Cellars, Petrichor Vineyards, Redwood Hill Vineyard, and St. Helena Road Vineyards.
