= Petaluma Gap =

Geographical region in California

Coordinates: 38°15′02″N 122°41′59″W

The Petaluma Gap is a geographical region in Sonoma County, California which extends in a band from the Pacific Ocean to San Pablo Bay. It is an area of low land 22 to 31 miles (35 to 50 kilometers) wide in the coast ranges of the northern San Francisco Bay Area. The western edge of the gap is located in the coastal lowlands between Bodega Bay and Tomales Bay. The eastern edge of the gap is located at San Pablo Bay around the mouth of the Petaluma River. The city of Petaluma is near the center of the gap.

The Petaluma Gap affects wind patterns (and thus microclimates and air quality) in the San Francisco Bay Area. Fresh marine air generally blows eastward through the gap, branching into southward and northward streams which blow toward the Carquinez Strait and Santa Rosa respectively. The southward stream brings marine air overland into the central Bay Area from the northwest. Warm air rises from the land and allows cold, moist air, plus winds and fog to move into the area.

== Petaluma Gap AVA ==
Vineyards have been prevalent in the Petaluma Gap since the 1880s. During the 1990s, the Sonoma County wine industry adopted the term Petaluma Gap to help differentiate its products. It is a sub-region of the Sonoma Coast AVA. Wine grapes growing in the Petaluma Gap are said to be influenced enough by this climate to give its wines a distinctive character. Mornings in the region tend to be foggy, followed by sunny days and windy afternoons. The cool evening temperatures help to preserve the natural acidity of the grapes over an extended growing season. Although many varietals are grown, the Petaluma Gap is best known for its Pinot Noir, Chardonnay, and Syrah grapes.

In 2006, twenty-four local organizations and individuals formed a promotional group called the Petaluma Gap Grape and Wine Alliance, now known as the Petaluma Gap Winegrowers Alliance. In February 2015, the PGWA submitted a petition to the Alcohol and Tobacco Tax and Trade Bureau (TTB) to establish the Petaluma Gap as a formally recognized American Viticultural Area (AVA). On December 7, 2017, the 202,476 acres (316 sq mi) region was designated as Petaluma Gap AVA with an effective date of January 8, 2018.
