= Sonoma Coast AVA =

American Viticultural Area in Sonoma County, California

Coordinates: 38°19′40″N 123°01′45″W

- Wine region
- Type: American Viticultural Area
- Year established: 1987
- Years of wine industry: 209
- Country: United States
- Part of: California, North Coast AVA, Sonoma County
- Sub-regions: Chalk Hill AVA, Fort Ross-Seaview AVA, Green Valley of Russian River Valley AVA, Los Carneros AVA, Northern Sonoma AVA, Petaluma Gap AVA, Russian River Valley AVA, Sonoma Valley AVA, West Sonoma Coast AVA
- Total area: 480,000 acres (750 sq mi)
- Size of planted vineyards: 11,452 acres (4,634 ha)
- Grapes produced: Cabernet Franc, Cabernet Sauvignon, Chardonnay, Gewurztraminer, Marsanne, Merlot, Pinot gris, Pinot Meunier, Pinot noir, Pinotage, Roussanne, Sauvignon blanc, Syrah, Viognier, Zinfandel
- No. of wineries: 269

Sonoma Coast is an American Viticultural Area (AVA) in Sonoma County, California encompassing approximately 480,000 acres (750 sq mi), mostly along the coastline of the Pacific Ocean, but also includes inland areas extending from San Pablo Bay to the Mendocino County border. It was established on June 10, 1987, as the nation's 91^{st}, the state's 50^{th} and the county's eleventh appellation by the Bureau of Alcohol, Tobacco and Firearms (ATF), Treasury after reviewing the petition submitted by Ms. Sara Schorske, a wine industry consultant residing in Santa Rosa, California, proposing a viticultural area in Sonoma County, to be known as "Sonoma Coast."
The appellation is known for its cool climate and high rainfall relative to other parts of Sonoma County. The area has such a broad range of microclimates that petitions were submitted to the Alcohol and Tobacco Tax and Trade Bureau (TTB), Treasury to establish the unique coastal viticultural areas of Fort Ross-Seaview, recognized in December 2011, and the West Sonoma Coast, recently established in 2023. The plant hardiness zone ranges from 9a to 10b.

== History ==
Viticulture in the Sonoma coastal area is thought to be the first in what is today the North Coast AVA. Vitis vinefera vines may have been planted as early as 1817 according to historian Charles L Sullivan. These vines were planted by Russian settlers looking to establish agricultural outposts in the Fort Ross vicinity. Vines were reported to be bearing fruit in 1823. By the 1880s, vines were established and wine was commercially produced in several places throughout western Sonoma County, including, but not limited to, the areas around Freestone and Occidental, Bodega, Forestville, Guerneville, and Cazadero. Steve Heimoff, a wine writer, further notes ten acres (4 ha) of vineyard "at Plantation above Fort Ross Road, northwest of Cazadero." Most of the western Sonoma County wine industry did not survive phylloxera outbreaks and Prohibition. Lemoral Winery near Occidental, built in 1903, was in operation until the 1960s.

== Geography ==
The boundaries of the appellation are defined in the Code of Federal Regulations, Title 27, Section 9.116. The following seven cities are located in, or partly in, the Sonoma Coast AVA:

- Cotati
- portions of Healdsburg
- Fort Ross
- Rohnert Park
- Petaluma
- portions of Santa Rosa
- Sebastopol
- portions of Sonoma

The Petaluma Gap is also part of the Sonoma Coast AVA.

== Wineries ==
E & J Gallo Winery operates Two Rock Vineyard, a 400 acres (160 ha) hillside vineyard near Cotati.

== See also ==
- Sonoma County wine
