= Simi Winery =

Coordinates: 38.64413°N 122.87239°W

- Location: Healdsburg, California, USA
- Appellation: Sonoma County AVA
- Founded: 1876
- Parent company: Constellation Brands
- Cases/yr: 500,000 (2013)
- Varietals: Cabernet Sauvignon, Chardonnay, Sauvignon blanc, Merlot
- Distribution: national
- Website: www.simiwinery.com

Simi Winery is a winery in California in the United States.

== History ==
The winery was founded in San Francisco, California in 1876 by two Italian brothers, Giuseppe and Pietro Simi, who had immigrated to the United States during the California Gold Rush. They moved operations to Healdsburg, California in 1881, paying $2,250 in gold coins to buy a winery on Front Street.

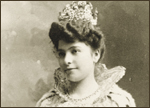
Isabelle Simi

The winery was run by Giuseppe Simi's daughter, Isabelle Simi, beginning in 1904. After marrying a local banker, Isabelle continued to make wine during Prohibition from 1920 until 1933, which she stored in the winery's stone cellars. One of the few California wineries to survive Prohibition, Simi was forced to sell most of its vineyards to survive, but was also one of the few companies to have wine available when sales were again legal. Simi opened its first tasting room in 1934. Isabel Simi sold the winery to grower Russell Green in 1970 but continued working there.

In 1973 Maryann Graf, the first woman to graduate from an American university with a degree in oenology, joined Simi. In 1979 winemaking was taken over by Zelma Long, one of California's most prominent winemakers, who modernized and brought the winery to national prominence. The winery was sold in 1981 to Moët-Hennessy, which in turn became part of LVMH Moët Hennessy. Beginning 1982 the winery began to re-acquire its own vineyards. Long, who continued after the Hennessy sale, eventually became president and CEO.

LVMH sold the winery for approximately US$50 million in 1999 to Canandaigua Brands, a division of Constellation Brands. It is now owned by Icon Estates, Constellation's luxury wine subsidiary.

== Production ==
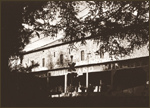
Simi Winery

Simi owns 600 acres (2.4 km^{2}) of vineyards in Alexander Valley, planted in Bordeaux varietal wines, and the 120-acre (0.5 km^{2}) "Goldfields Vineyard" in Russian River Valley, planted to Chardonnay clones.

== See also ==
- California wine
- Sonoma County wine
