= B.R. Cohn Winery =

Coordinates: 38.34888°N 122.50225°W

- Location: Glen Ellen, California, USA
- Appellation: Sonoma Valley
- Formerly: Olive Hill Estate Vineyards
- Founded: 1984
- Key people: Bruce Cohn, founder Marco DiGiulio, winemaker
- Parent company: Adair Family Wines
- Cases/yr: 25,000
- Known for: Olive Hill Estate Cabernet
- Varietals: cabernet sauvignon, merlot, chardonnay, pinot noir, zinfandel, malbec, sauvignon blanc, cabernet franc, petit verdot
- Other products: olive oil, balsamic vinegar, citrus olive oils, gourmet foods
- Distribution: United States, Canada
- Tasting: open to public
- Website: www.brcohn.com

B.R. Cohn Winery is a winery in Sonoma Valley, California in the United States.

== History ==
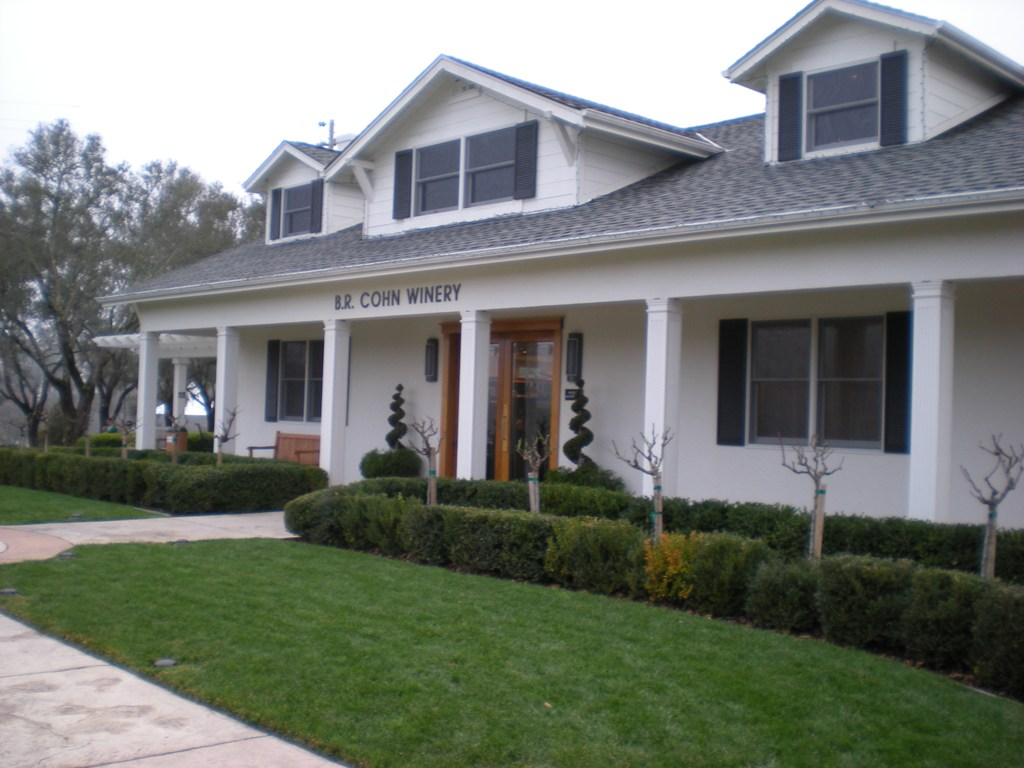
Tasting room entrance

Bruce Cohn, former manager of the California rock band, The Doobie Brothers, purchased the original area in 1974. He named the property the Olive Hill Estate Vineyards after the grove of 145-year-old olive Picholine olive trees. After selling grapes to other wineries for several years, Cohn founded his own winery, B.R. Cohn, in 1984. His first winemaker was the now-famous Helen Turley. Like other wineries in the area it maintains a wine club and public tasting room, and hosts weddings and other events.

In 2015, the winery was bought by Vintage Wine Estates. In July 2024, Vintage Wine Estates filed for Chapter 11 bankruptcy protection, with plans to sell all of its assets, including B.R. Cohn Winery. In late 2024, Adair Family Wines took over and claimed B.R. Cohn, along with 4 other sister wineries.

== Wines ==
The vineyards surrounding the winery are planted mostly in cabernet sauvignon grapes, with some pinot noir, zinfandel, petite sirah, cabernet franc, petit verdot, and malbec. Syrah (sold only from the tasting room) and Chardonnay is grown in the carneros region.

The winery's flagship 1985 and 1986 Olive Hill Cabernets were ranked among the top ten in America and top 50 in the World by Wine Spectator, which gave each a rating of 94 out of 100. The 2003 vintage was rated 93. The North Coast Petit Syrah was one of two red "sweepstakes winners" at the 2007 San Francisco Chronicle Wine Competition. The winery also produces merlot, rosé, and port.

== Oil and vinegar ==
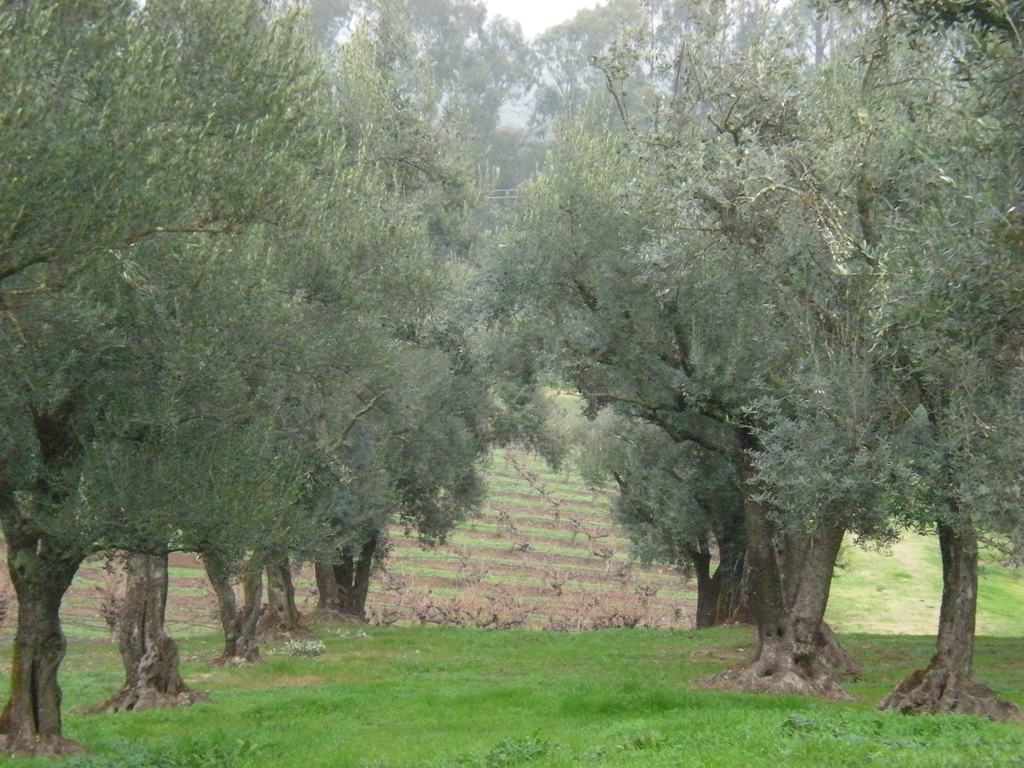
Olive trees at B.R. Cohn

Starting in the 1990s, B.R. Cohn expanded into artisan olive oil production. Today, it produces flavored and unflavored oils, including an organic variety, balsamic vinegars, and other unique gourmet foods.

The company also produces vinegar on-site from cabernet, chardonnay, and sparkling wine (including pear chardonnay and a raspberry champagne flavors), using the French "Orleans" method whereby batches of vinegar are produced by adding a "mother" dose of old vinegar to fresh wine, then aging 18–22 months in oak barrels. It also bottles a 25, 15 and a 12-year-old balsamic vinegar imported from Modena, Italy.

== See also ==
- List of celebrities who own wineries and vineyards
