= Fort Ross-Seaview AVA =

American Viticultural Area in Sonoma County, California

Coordinates: 38°30′41″N 123°11′40″W

Fort Ross-Seaview
- Wine region
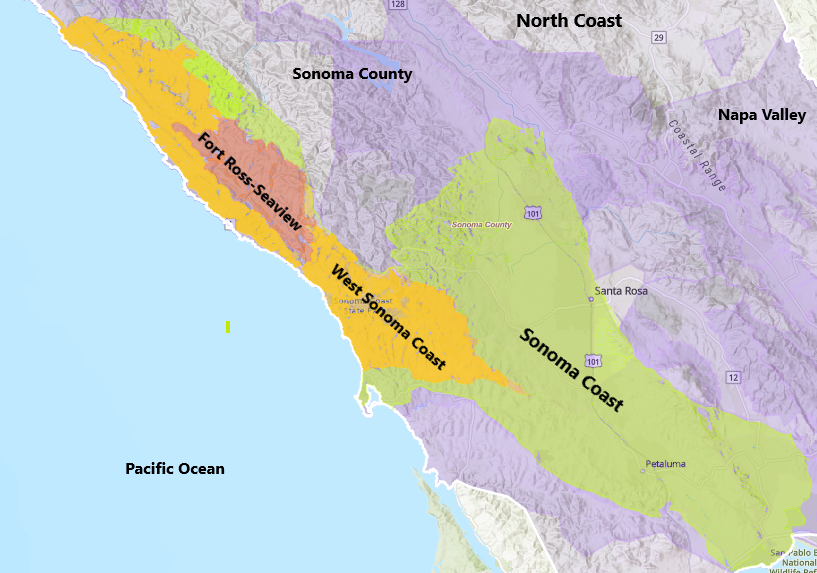
- Type: American Viticultural Area
- Year established: 2011
- Years of wine industry: 209
- Country: United States
- Part of: California, North Coast AVA, Sonoma County, Sonoma Coast AVA, West Sonoma Coast AVA
- Growing season: 264 days
- Climate region: Region II
- Heat units: 2,580–2,615 GDD units
- Precipitation (annual average): 2 to 4 in (50–100 mm)
- Soil conditions: Gravelly loam derived from metamorphic rock
- Total area: 27,500 acres (43 sq mi)
- Size of planted vineyards: 506 acres (205 ha)
- No. of vineyards: 18
- Grapes produced: Chardonnay, Marsanne, Pinot Noir, Pinot Meunier, Pinotageóa, Roussane, Syrah, Viognier, Zinfindel
- No. of wineries: 5

Fort Ross-Seaview is an American Viticultural Area (AVA) located along the Pacific coast of Sonoma County, California. It was established as the nation's 201^{st}, the state's 124^{th} and the county's sixteenth appellation on December 13, 2011, by the Alcohol and Tobacco Tax and Trade Bureau (TTB), Treasury after reviewing the petition submitted by Patrick L. Shabram, on his behalf and David Hirsch of Hirsch Vineyards with all the wine grape growers and bonded wineries within the 27,000-acre (42 sq mi) viticultural area within coastal Sonoma County to be named "Fort Ross-Seaview." The AVA is located adjacent to the Pacific Ocean between Jenner and Sea Ranch, about 65 miles (105 km) north-northwest of San Francisco defined by its higher elevation. It lies entirely within the Sonoma Coast viticultural area and the vast multi-county North Coast AVA. Fort Ross-Seaview boundaries does not overlap, or otherwise affect, any other viticultural area. Eleven years later, the TTB established the 141,846 acres (222 sq mi) West Sonoma Coast appellation further distinguishing Sonoma's unique coastal environment from the inland regions within the larger Sonoma Coast AVA. As a result, Fort Ross-Seaview became a sub-appellation of West Sonoma Coast.

== Name Evidence ==
"Fort Ross-Seaview" is derived from a combination of Fort Ross, established as an agricultural outpost by Russian settlers in 1812, and Seaview, a community located on the western edge of the AVA. The first known plantings of grape vines in the Northern California Coast was by Russian inhabitants of the Fort Ross in 1817. The existing fort and surrounding community has continuously been known as Fort Ross and is easily identifiable on nearly any map of the area. Since 1906, the site of the fort has been called the Fort Ross State Historic Park; a reconstructed fort now is open to the public. The boundaries of Fort Ross-Seaview AVA are adjacent to Fort Ross State Historic Park.
The name "Seaview" is derived from the small, unincorporated community and real estate development located along the Pacific Coast Highway (State Route 1) and on Seaview Road to the north of the park. Much of the Seaview community is located within the viticultural area which defines much of the western edge of the AVA boundary. This community is identified on USGS Santa Rosa, California scale maps, approximately 2.5 miles (4.0 km) northwest of Fort Ross. Both the community of Seaview and Seaview Road, a relatively major road for this area, are used as reference points for local residents of this section of coastal Sonoma County. Both "Fort Ross" and "Seaview" have been used to identify the grape growing region within the boundary of the AVA. "Seaview" has more meaning to local residents and growers, while "Fort Ross" has been used to define the area on a more regional level due to the well-known nature of the historical landmark. As these two names have been used interchangeably to identify this wine growing region over the last several years, the use of "Fort Ross-Seaview" has become increasing common by local wine grape growers.

== History ==
In 1812, Fort Ross was established by Russian fur trappers on a bluff, lying just west of the boundary of the Fort Ross-Seaview viticultural area overlooking the Pacific Ocean. The fort served as Russia's southernmost outpost in the Pacific Northwest until it was abandoned in 1841. Viticulture in the Sonoma coastal area is thought to be the first in what is today the North Coast AVA. Vitis vinefera vines were planted as early as 1817, when Captain Leontii Andreianovich Hagemeister planted Peruvian grape cuttings at Fort Ross according to historian Charles L Sullivan. Vines were planted by Russian settlers looking to establish agricultural outposts in the Fort Ross vicinity. Vines were reported to be bearing fruit in 1823. By the 1880s, vines were established and wine was commercially produced in several places throughout western Sonoma County, including, but not limited to, the areas around Freestone and Occidental, Bodega, Forestville, Guerneville, and Cazadero. Steve Heimoff, a wine writer, further notes ten acres (4 ha) of vineyard "at Plantation above Fort Ross Road, northwest of Cazadero." Most of the western Sonoma County wine industry did not survive phylloxera outbreaks and Prohibition. Lemoral Winery near Occidental, built in 1903, was in operation until the 1960s.

It was not until the 1970s that the Sonoma coastal area experienced a rebound, starting with rancher Michael Bohan who took a chance and planted one acre of Zinfindel on his generational family sheep ranch in 1972. The next year, Bohan planted two more acres of grapes three miles (4.8 km) east of Fort Ross, between Seaview Road and Creighton Ridge. In 1974, he planted another 15 acres (6.1 ha), and started selling his grape harvests, in 1976, to wineries in Sonoma and Santa Cruz counties.
Simultaneously, several other growers started operations in the local area, including Precious Mountain Vineyards in Fort Ross-Seaview. Dr. John Young and his daughter, Joan Young Zeller, are believed to have planted grapes on Taylor Lane near Occidental in 1977, while wine grape vines in what was to become Annapolis Winery were planted in 1978. Sea Ridge Winery was established in 1979 and became the destination for many of these earliest coast grape plantings in the Fort Ross-Seaview area. In 1980, co-petitioner David Hirsch planted a vineyard between the 1,300 and 1,600 ft (400–490 m) elevations, according to an April 2003 letter to Mr. Shabram that was submitted as a supplemental exhibit to the petition.
Additional plantings took place throughout the 1980s and 1990s. Mr. Sullivan credits a "growing interest in wines with a Burgundian style and flavor" as a catalyst for westward movement to the extreme coastal environments. By 1999, growers in Fort Ross-Seaview were exploring the possibility of establishing an AVA and commissioned Patrick Shabram, a geographer and author of this petition, to study the geography of the area. A petition was submitted in 2003 to the Bureau of Alcohol, Tobacco and Firearms (ATF) to establish the Fort Ross-Seaview AVA. Approval of the viticultural area was delayed for several reasons, including an interest by other growers in the overall Sonoma coastal region to establish an AVA that distinguishes it independent from the expansive Sonoma Coast AVA. The Fort Ross-Seaview AVA was approved in 2011, but growers in the area, including growers within Fort Ross-Seaview continued to organize efforts to distinguish the entire coastal Sonoma viticultural area. The petition notes that, in spring 2003, the proposed viticultural area contained 18 commercial vineyards cultivating 506 acres (205 ha).

== Terroir ==
=== Topography ===
The Fort Ross-Seaview topography is defined by its distance from the Pacific and a series of three coastal ridges with the third, west-facing slopes on the ridge line set back from the ocean. The elevated boundaries lines above 920 feet (280 m) are the AVA's main differentiating feature setting the summer fog line with areas above and below. The elevations above 600 feet (180 m) can experience significantly greater summer heat as nighttime temperatures fall off rapidly and provide significant diurnal effects. The petition explains that vineyards in the area are generally located on rounded ridges with summits extending above 1,200 feet (370 m). The USGS maps in the petition show that the viticultural area consists of steep, mountainous terrain made up of canyons, narrow valleys, ridge, and 800 to 1,800 feet (240–550 m) peaks. The area, mainly at elevations of between 920 and 1,800 feet (280–550 m), has meandering, light-duty or unimproved roads and jeep trails and scattered creeks and ponds. The USGS maps provided by the petition show the western boundary of the Fort Ross-Seaview viticultural area to be located between 0.5 and 2.5 miles (0.8–4.0 km) from the Pacific coastline and mostly at or above the 920 feet (280 m) elevation line which separates the sunnier viticultural area from the surrounding foggy areas in the lower elevations. The maps also show that the San Andreas Rift Zone runs generally parallel to the proposed western boundary line, between the boundary and the Pacific coastline. The petition did not include a description of the topography in the surrounding areas.

=== Climate ===
The viticultural area is not directly affected by marine fog. In areas generally above 900 feet (270 m) in elevation, the climate is influenced by longer periods of sunlight and is warmer than that in the surrounding land below 900 ft (270 m). The prevalence of marine fog below the 900 feet (270 m) elevation line causes the surrounding, lower areas to be cooler and to have a shorter growing season than that in the viticultural area. The coastal fog and its effects on agriculture were studied for more than three decades by Robert Sisson, former County Director and Farm Advisor for Sonoma County. Mr. Sisson mapped the diverse climate of the lowermost, foggy coastal areas that surround some of the higher, sunnier elevations. TTB noted that the Sisson system of climatic classification takes into account the amount of time that a vine is actually exposed to a certain temperature. The system uses such terms as "Coastal Cool" and "Coastal Warm," which incorporate a method of heat summation that takes into account not only the highs and lows but the number of hours at which temperatures remain in the highly effective photosynthesis range of 70 and 90 °F (21–32 °C). "Coastal Cool" is designated as having a cumulative duration of less than 1,000 hours between 70 and 90 °F (21–32 °C) in April through October. The petition stated that the viticultural area is "Coastal Cool" ("Climate Types of Sonoma County," map, Vassen, 1986). The area can support viticulture, in contrast to the surrounding, lower-elevation, cooler, less sunny, marine climatic areas that cannot sustain viticulture, according to the petition. The petition also states that the Fort Ross-Seaview viticultural area is in the heaviest fog intrusion area, spanning the entire coast of Sonoma County ("Lines of Heaviest and Average Maximum Fog Intrusion for Sonoma County," map, by Carol Ann Lawson, 1976). However, TTB notes that this map does not detail the heavy fog line from the contrasting warmer and sunnier microclimates at higher elevations, such as that which exists in the viticultural area. The petition states that the water temperature of the ocean off the Pacific coast to the west of the viticultural area rarely rises above 60 °F (16 °C). From mid- spring to fall, a fog bank is created offshore that moves inland through low- elevation mountain gaps and valleys. The fog, rarely rising above the 900 feet (270 m) elevation line, cools temperatures on shore and reduces sunshine in the early mornings and late afternoons at elevations of 900 feet (270 m) or less. Consequently, the viticultural area, which lies mainly between the 920 and 1,800 feet (280–550 m) elevation lines, receives less fog and more sun during the growing season than the surrounding, lower areas. The petition compares the Fort Ross-Seaview viticultural area to the southwestern portion of the Sonoma Coast and nearby Russian River Valley viticultural areas. Those areas, to the southwest and to the northeast, respectively, have cool and comparatively less sunny climates because they generally receive marine fog and do not lie above the fog line. The petition states that temperatures are roughly comparable during the coolest part of the year at Fort Ross State Historic Park at the 112 feet (34 m) elevation level, just west of the boundary, and at Campmeeting Ridge in Seaview at the 1,220 ft (370 m) elevation level, located within the viticultural area. However, daily high temperatures during the growing season May through October and daily low temperatures in June and from August through October are warmer on the ridge than at the park, according to the petition. Significant growing season temperature variations occur at points between these lower and higher elevations.

=== Soil ===
The petition states that the soils consist of Yorkville, Boomer, Sobrante, Laughlin, and many other soils within the Fort Ross-Seaview viticultural area. Hugo soils are common in the Fort Ross-Seaview viticultural area and in the mountain ranges of Sonoma County and Mendocino County to the north of the viticultural area. Hugo soils are well drained, very gravelly loams derived from sandstone and shale. The petition states that some soils in the viticultural area derived from metamorphic rocks and, to a lesser extent, igneous rocks, but most soils derived from sedimentary rocks. The petition also states that the sedimentary rocks in the viticultural area contrast with the relatively younger sedimentary rocks that are the parent material of the soils in the area to the west and that coincide with the San Andreas Rift Zone. The petition did not include any soils data for the surrounding areas, except for the area to the west mentioned above.

== Viticulture ==
Fort Ross-Seaview AVA is resident for several wineries and vineyards growing a diverse selection of mostly cool-climate grapes. Wineries can now list Fort Ross-Seaview on their labels, though many wineries can still continue to use the more well-known Sonoma Coast labeling. Fort Ross Vineyard, Winery & Tasting Room was founded in the 1990s by Lester and Linda Schwartz, South African immigrants, and is open daily for tasting Pinot Noir, Chardonnay and Pinotage. Flowers Vineyards & Winery opened the House of Flowers, offering tasting experiences just minutes from downtown Healdsburg in northern Sonoma County.
Many other wineries operating within or sourcing grapes from the Fort Ross-Seaview AVA are not open to the public, and often their wines are available only by waiting list or from specialty retailers. They include Wild Hog, Marcassin, Failla, Williams Selyem and Peay Vineyards.
