= Petaluma Gap AVA =

American Viticultural Area

Coordinates: 38°13′08″N 122°40′59″W

Petaluma Gap
- Wine region
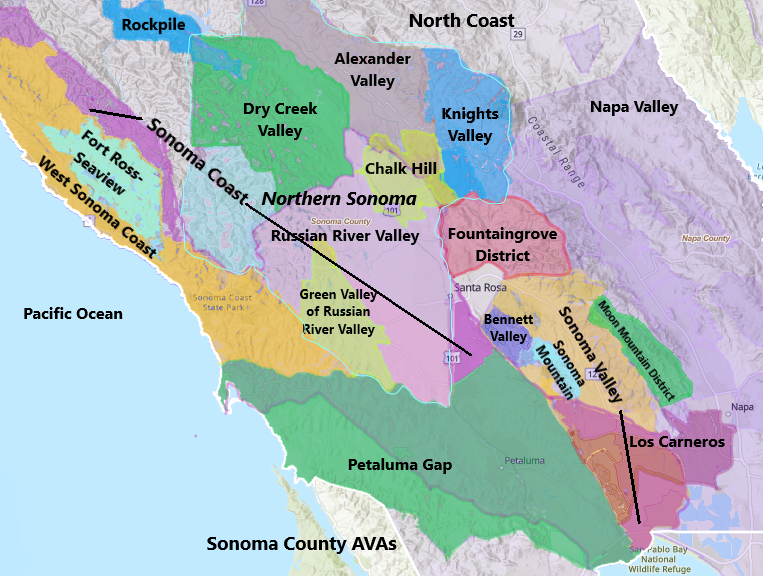
- Type: American Viticultural Area
- Year established: 2017
- Years of wine industry: 196
- Country: United States
- Part of: California, North Coast AVA, Sonoma County, Sonoma Coast AVA
- Other regions in California, North Coast AVA, Sonoma County, Sonoma Coast AVA: Los Carneros AVA, Russian River Valley AVA, Sonoma Valley AVA
- Climate region: Mediterranean
- Precipitation (annual average): 30 inches (760 mm)
- Soil conditions: Sedimentary parent material and alluvial. Common series include Steinbeck/Tomales and Clear Lake
- Total area: 202,476 acres (316 sq mi)
- Size of planted vineyards: 4,000 acres (1,619 ha)
- No. of vineyards: 80
- Varietals produced: Chardonnay, Pinot Noir, Syrah
- No. of wineries: 9

Petaluma Gap is an American Viticultural Area (AVA) located in southwestern Sonoma County, California encompassing the Petaluma Gap landform. It was established as the nation's 240^{th}, the state's 148^{th} and the county's nineteenth appellation on December 7, 2017 by the Alcohol and Tobacco Tax and Trade Bureau (TTB), Treasury after reviewing the petition submitted by Patrick L. Shabram, on behalf of the Petaluma Gap Winegrowers Alliance (PGWA), proposing the viticultural area named "Petaluma Gap."
The appellation spans 202,476 acres (316 sq mi) stretching through an 30 miles (48 km) inland valley from the Pacific coast at Bodega Bay southeast to Highway 37 at Sears Point on San Pablo Bay straddling the border of northern Marin and southern Sonoma counties.
The wind gap in its coastal mountain range funnels cooling breezes and fog east from the Pacific Ocean through the city of Petaluma to San Pablo Bay. A persistent afternoon breeze causes lower grape yields and longer hang time contributes to the AVA vintages' unique flavors and fruit characteristics which defines their character and distinction At the outset, the appellation contained eighty commercially-producing vineyards cultivating 4,000 acres (1,619 ha) and sourcing nine bonded wineries. Around 75 percent of plantings are Pinot Noir, with Chardonnay at 13 percent, and Syrah 12 percent.

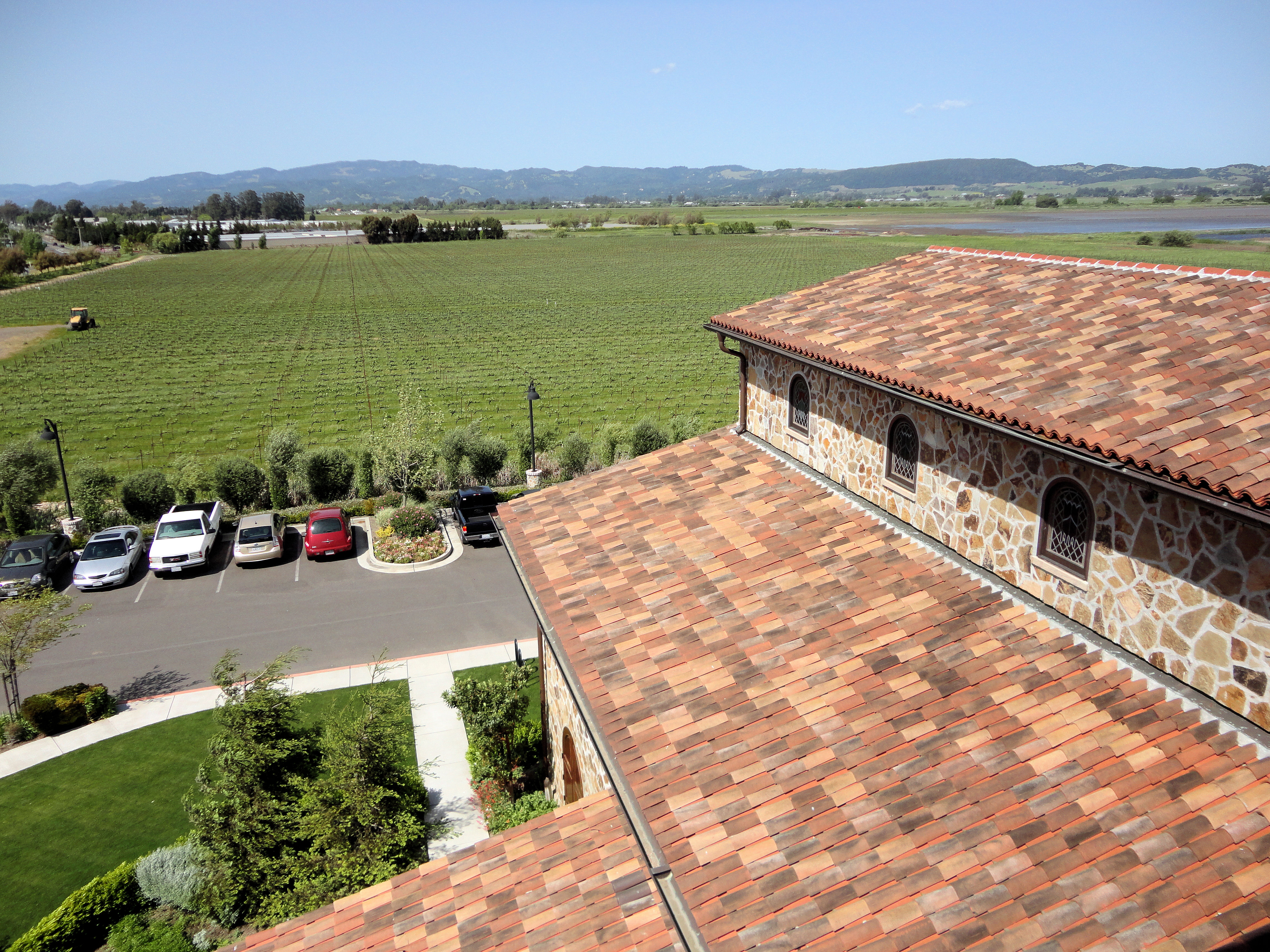
Jacuzzi Family Vineyards & Winery

== Terroir ==
The distinguishing features of the Petaluma Gap are its topography and climate that sets the appellation uniquely from Sonoma Coast AVA. The 'Gap' literally describes the geological valley that is a 15 miles (24 km) wide by 30 miles (48 km) corridor between the coastal hills allowing the salty maritime winds and a cycle of morning fog, clearing sunny spells, more fog in the afternoon and clearer evenings to flow eastward through the region. A typical day in the valley can experience a temperature change of 40 to 50 °F (22–28 °C). These cycles contribute to a longer growing season benefiting cool-climate grape varieties. The lower elevations and rolling hills in Petaluma Gap allows the marine air to enter at a higher velocity than the surrounding regions where higher and steeper slopes disrupt the air flow. Although marine breezes are present during most of the day, the wind increases significantly in the afternoon hours because the rising inland hot air pulls the cooler, heavier marine layer from the coast causing a steady airflow. The effect of these prolonged high winds on the grapes is a reduction in photosynthesis to the extent that the grapes have to remain on the vine longer (hang time) in order to reach a given sugar level, compared to the same grape varietal grown in a less windy locations. Grapes grown in windy regions are typically smaller and have thicker skins than the same varietal grown elsewhere. According to the AVA's petition, the smaller grape size, thicker skins, and longer hang time concentrate the flavor compounds in the fruit, allowing grapes that are harvested at lower sugar levels to still have the typical flavor characteristics of the grape varietal. Also with the wind, there is no botrytis or mildew issues and the grapes have a higher skin-to-juice ratio. The USDA plant hardiness zones range from 9a to 10a.

The TTB modified the boundary of the North Coast AVA as described in Notice No. 163 because it determined the expansion area had the similar marine-influenced climate of the North Coast AVA. Therefore, the North Coast was expanded approximately 28,077 acres (44 sq mi) to include all of the Petaluma Gap and a partial overlap with the Sonoma Coast AVA. The Marin County portion of the Petaluma Gap remained outside of the Sonoma Coast AVA, while the Sonoma County portion remained within the Sonoma Coast AVA. TTB allowed the partial overlap to remain, primarily because the name "Sonoma Coast" is associated only with the coastal region of Sonoma County and does not extend into Marin County.
