= Charles Creek Vineyard =

Winery in Sonoma, California, US

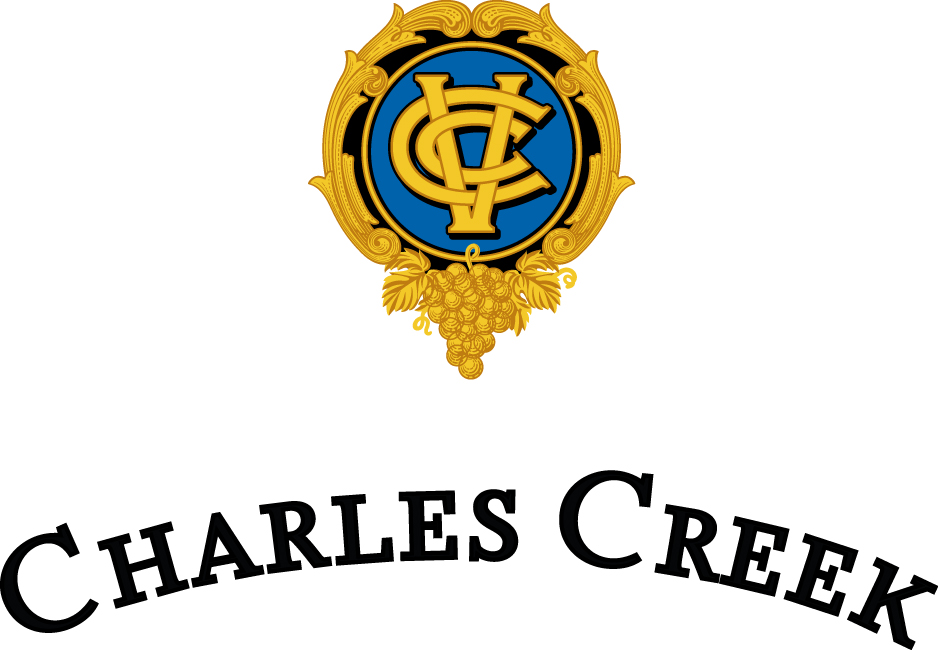
- Location: Sonoma, California, United States
- Coordinates: 38°17′32.77″N 122°27′32.62″W
- Appellation: Carneros
- Other labels: La Bomba
- Founded: 2001
- Key people: Bill Brinton & Gerry Brinton, Proprietors, Kerry Damskey, Winemaker
- Cases/yr: 8,000
- Varietals: Pinot grigio, Chardonnay, Riesling, Merlot, Cabernet Sauvignon, Syrah, Rose, Malbec, Sangiovese, Pinot noir
- Distribution: National

Charles Creek Vineyard was a winery in Sonoma, California, that specialized in Chardonnay and Cabernet Sauvignon wine and dessert wine.

== History ==
Charles Creek was founded in January 2002 by husband and wife Bill & Gerry Brinton. A veteran of the beverage industry, Bill owned the Wiman Beverage Company since 1993. They chose to sell Wimans as their interest in wine making grew, selling it to Naked Juice in 2000. Owning property on Sonoma Mountain since 1984, the Brintons had been experimenting with winemaking since their first planting of Chardonnay in 1992, and after the sale of Wiman they chose to move to Sonoma from San Francisco.

After several experiments with Chardonnay and Merlot grapes, the Brintons decided to focus on working with regional grape growers and made their small vineyard into a solar farm. In 2002 they founded Charles Creek, which is named after the couple's son Charley and Bill's grandfather, Charles Deere Wiman.

In November 2014 they shuttered the winery and tasting room, calling it a "bittersweet farewell."

== Wine production ==
Charles Creek worked with a number of wine growers throughout Sonoma and Napa including: Merlot and Chardonnay growers Hyde Vineyard and Sangiacomo Vineyards and Cabernet Sauvignon growers Mountain Terraces Vineyard and Stage Coach Vineyard Not owning their own production facility, they worked with Sonoma Wine Company, a custom winery production facility. Charles Creek maintained their own barrels and inventory at Sonoma Wine, which the Brintons believed helped keep their costs down and their wine at a reasonable price point.

== Tasting room ==
Charles Creek maintained a tasting room, art gallery and retail space on the square in downtown Sonoma. Two creatures paid special homage in the tasting room - the owl - a mascot of the tasting room, a tribute to Bill's grandmother, who bore the nickname Owl, and a life-sized cow made entirely of wine corks.
