= Gloria Ferrer Caves & Vineyards =

Winery in Sonoma County, California, U.S.

Coordinates: 38.22364°N 122.47207°W

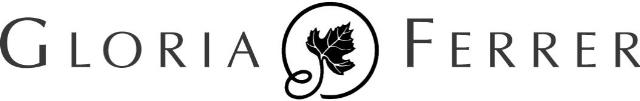
- Location: Sonoma, California, USA
- Appellation: Carneros AVA
- Founded: 1986
- Key people: José and Gloria Ferrer, Founders
- Parent company: Henkell Friexenet
- Cases/yr: 100,000
- Known for: Carneros Cuvee, Royal Cuvee, Sonoma Brut, Blanc de Noir
- Varietals: Sparkling wine, Pinot noir, Chardonnay, Pinot Blanc
- Other products: Olive Oil
- Distribution: International
- Tasting: Open to the public
- Website: http://www.gloriaferrer.com

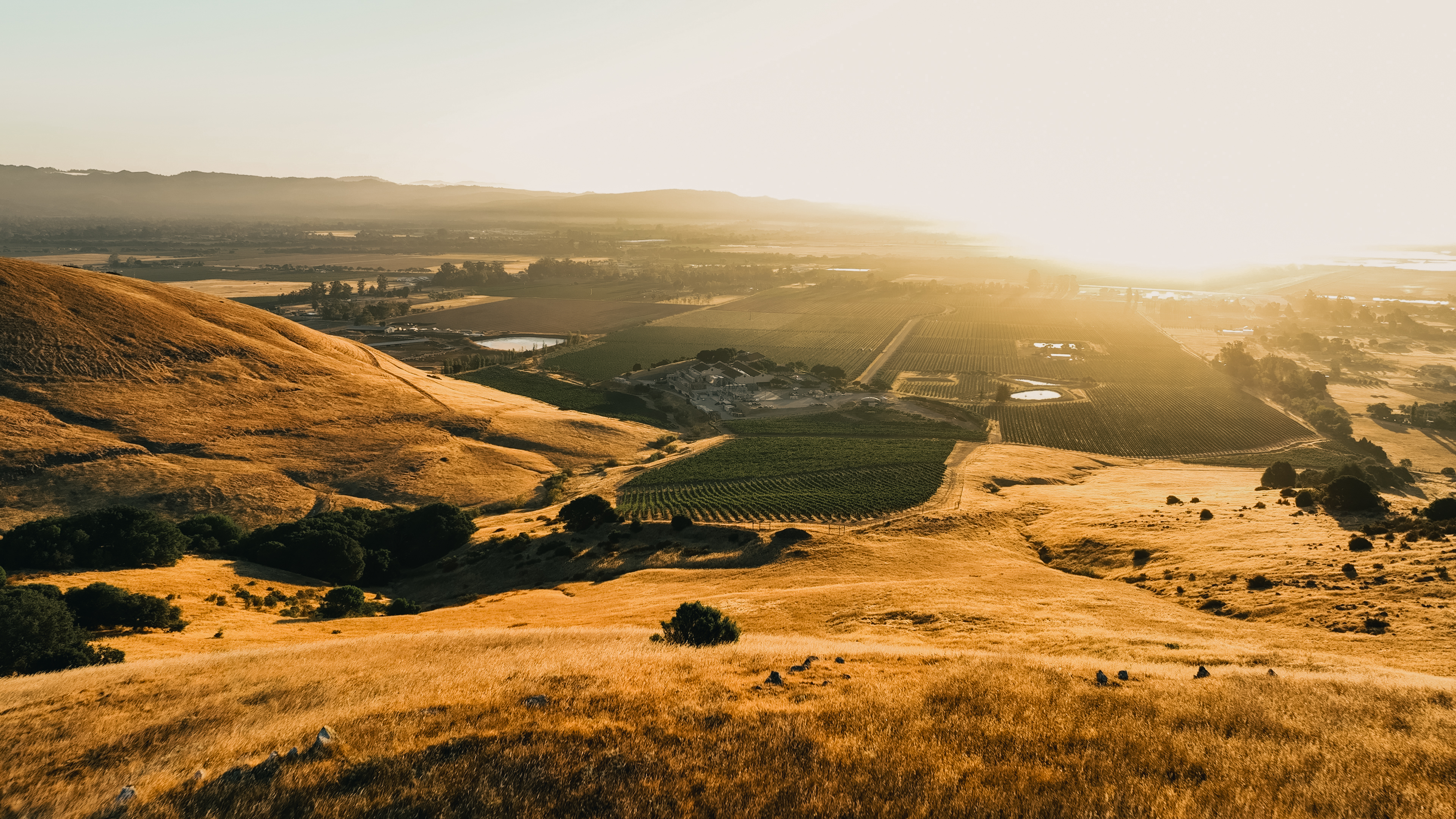
Homeranch

Gloria Ferrer Caves & Vineyards is a winery in Sonoma County, California that specializes in sparkling wines, as well as Pinot noir and Chardonnay wine. It was the first sparkling wine producer in Carneros. It was also the first to plant Champagne grape clones in the region.

== History ==
Gloria Ferrer was founded in 1982 by the Ferrer family as their primary venture into California winemaking. Owners of Freixenet S.A., one of the primarily Cava producers in Spain, they fulfilled the family's lifelong dream of producing wine in the United States. Purchasing 156 acres of cattle ranch land, an additional 100 acres was acquired and production began. The winery was named after José Ferrer's wife, Gloria.

They began producing in 1986 and while primarily founded as a sparkling wine making venue, in the early 1990s they began producing still wine. Upon this decision, red wine producing facilities were built and the wine caves were expanded for storage of both types of production.

Gloria Ferrer's wine making mission is: To capture the full expression of the distinctive Carneros terroir in wines made to pair perfectly with food.

== Wine production ==
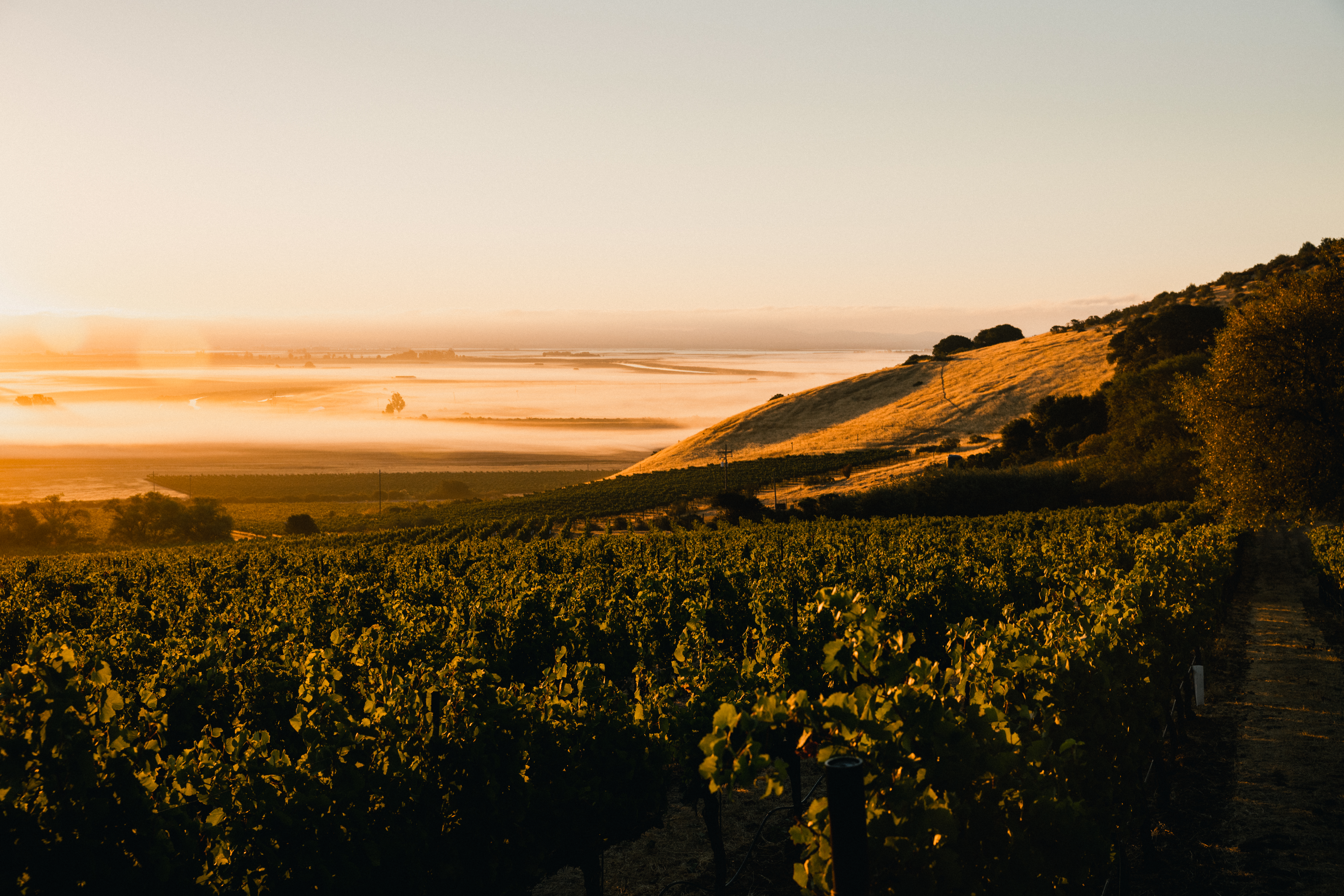
Circle Bar Ranch

Gloria Ferrer's head winemaker is Kyle Altomare and the vineyard manager is Brad Kurtz.

Gloria Ferrer owns 335 acres of estate owned vineyards and also works with other grape growers throughout the region to make their wines. They own two vineyards: Home Ranch Estate Vineyards, which is 207 acres of Chardonnay and Pinot noir grapes, and Circle Bar Ranch, 128 acres of Pinot noir and Chardonnay. Their grapes are hand picked, in the early morning hours, during harvest season.

Well known for their grape clone studies, the Gloria Ferrer team started experimenting in 1988. Working with UC Davis they started three clonal tests on the two varietals and have since studied over 40 Pinot noir and Chardonnay clones to date. Each clone is tested for vegetation, vine balance, acidity, harvest time, and proper environment.

Sustainability is a strong part of the wine making process as well. Legume cover crops are planted in the vineyard to convert nitrogen for the vine use, as well as serving as homes for beneficial insects. Other examples include: the winery pomace is composted with local farm animal manure that is spread into the vineyards in the spring, wastewater from wine production is recycled back into the vineyards and native plants are the primary plantings throughout the vineyards and winery.

=== Sparkling wine ===
The wineries sparkling wines are made from a blend of Chardonnay and Pinot noir grapes, which are created by the traditional méthode champenoise.

Gloria Ferrer's Royal Cuvee is made from 67% Pinot noir and 33% Chardonnay it incorporates strawberry, raspberry, apple and lemon. Its name is a tribute to the King of Spain.

=== Pinot noir ===
The winery's Pinot noir is grown in two types of soil: loamy clay soil on flatter ground, which produces between five and six tons per acre, and rock & volcanic soil which produces between two and three tons per acre. Pinot noir clones are experimented with by Iantosca and Crumly, who seek to find the right grapes for their Carneros land. In 1988 thirteen clones were tested for their viticultural differences and a handful were selected to continue producing. The most successful clones include Colmar 538, Wente, Wädenswil, Pommard 4, Dijon 115 and Martini.

During the harvest the grapes are de-stemmed completely. Selected wines are filtered, as well. After processing, the wine is placed in 25% to 50% French oak barrels and aged for 9 months. Between 15,000 and 20,000 cases are produced.

They make two vineyard-designated Pinot Noirs from their clone research: The Rust Rock Terrace Pinot noir and Grave Knob Vineyard Pinot noir. The Rust Rock Terrace Pinot is from certain blocks of wines on the uppermost hillside of the Circle Bar Ranch vineyard, which has a volcanic ridgeline that provides strong growing conditions. The Gravel Knob is produced on the estates rockier and windier southwest corner which provides a more aromatic wine. Less than 400 cases of each wine are created each year.

== Olive oil production ==
The winery started growing olive trees in 1998 and have since planted almost 500 trees. The trees consist of Spanish Arbequina olives and Italian olives. Their extra virgin olive oil is sold exclusively at the tasting room.

== Tasting room ==
The tasting room is attached to the winery and is open to the public for tasting and seasonal vineyard tours, they also offer special events and a membership program. The winery is known for its culinary programs featuring estate-grown produce and its variety of events. The architecture is a tribute to Spanish and California mission design, designed to celebrate the Catalan tradition of the Ferrer family. The red tile rooftop and stucco walls are a throwback to the Ferrer family 11th century farmhouse in Sant Sadurní d'Anoia.

The tasting room was remodeled in 2021.
