= Los Carneros AVA =

American Viticultural Area in California

Coordinates: 38.25347°N 122.40296°W

Los Carneros
- Wine region
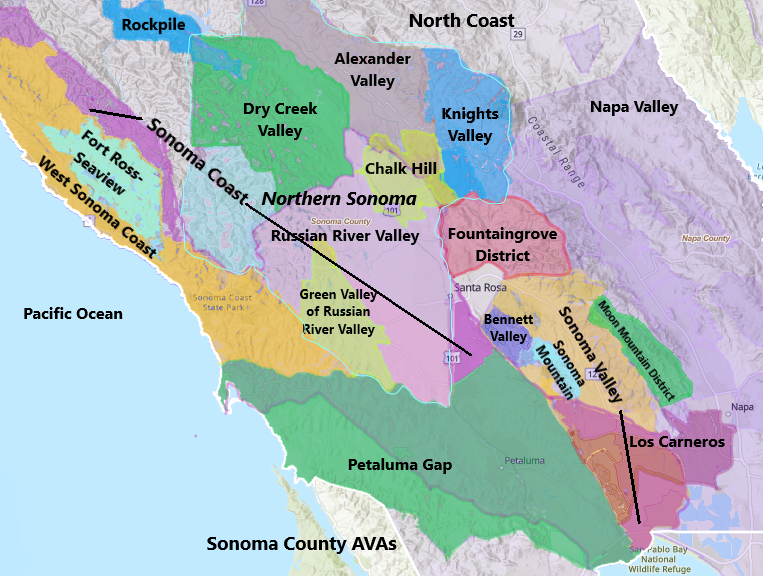
- Sonoma County AVAs
- Other names: Carneros
- Type: American Viticultural Area
- Year established: 1983; 2006 Amended
- Country: United States
- Part of: California, North Coast AVA, Napa County, Sonoma County, Napa Valley AVA, Sonoma Valley AVA
- Growing season: 277 days
- Climate region: Region Ia
- Heat units: 1,834 GDD units
- Precipitation (annual average): 25.22 inches (641 mm)
- Soil conditions: "Carnerosi" soils of the Haire-Coombs-Diablo series, clay and clay loams
- Total area: 37,000 acres (58 sq mi)
- Size of planted vineyards: 10,000 acres (4,047 ha)
- No. of vineyards: 40
- Grapes produced: Albarino, Barbera, Cabernet Franc, Cabernet Sauvignon, Chardonnay, Dolcetto, Gewurztraminer, Grenache, Malbec, Marsanne, Merlot, Muscat Canelli, Nebbiolo, Pinot blanc, Pinot gris, Pinot Meunier, Pinot noir, Riesling, Roussanne, Sauvignon blanc, Syrah, Tempranillo, Tocai Friulano, Vermentino, Vernaccia, Viognier, Zinfandel, Petit Verdot
- Varietals produced: Sparkling Wine
- No. of wineries: 30

Los Carneros and Carneros (/ kaɾˈneɾos/ kar-NE-ros) identifies the American Viticultural Area (AVA) located in the southern Sonoma and Napa counties of Northern California just north of San Pablo Bay and the San Francisco Bay Area. The 37,000-acre (58 sq mi) appellation was established as the nation's 37^{th}, the state's 24^{th}, Sonoma County's third and Napa County's second appellation on August 18, 1983 by the Bureau of Alcohol, Tobacco and Firearms (ATF), Treasury after reviewing the petition submitted by Beaulieu Vineyards proposing a viticultural area named "Los Carneros."

ATF determined that "Los Carneros" and "Carneros" are not different names, but are equivalent forms of the same name and considering the fact that the Spanish word "los" simply means "the." Consequently, either name may be used on labels and in advertising to refer to this area. The 2006 amendment described in Section §9.32 documents the names "Los Carneros" and "Carneros" can be used interchangeably for the viticultural area.
The close proximity to San Pablo Bay in the south exposes the area to coastal fog and breezes that makes the Los Carneros climate cooler and more moderate than wine regions farther north in Napa and Sonoma Valleys. The climate has positioned Los Carneros ideal for the cultivation of cool climate varietals like Pinot noir and Chardonnay. Los Carneros grapes are also processed for sparkling wine production. The Carneros area was the first wine region in California to be defined by its climate characteristics rather than political boundaries.

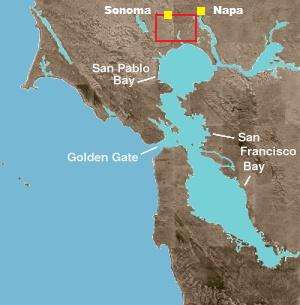
Approximate location of Carneros AVA north of San Pablo Bay.

== History ==
"Carneros" is Spanish for "rams," named after the many sheep that once dotted the hillsides of Sonoma and Napa counties, is inextricably linked to the Mexican jurisdiction that originally settled the lands in the area. To secularize the many Californian missions in the area and colonize the land, a Mexican land grant, Rincon de Los Carneros, the namesake of the Carneros region, was given to Mexican immigrants by the Californio general, Mariano Guadalupe Vallejo in the early 1800s. Early settlers were drawn to Sonoma's fertile lands and moderate climate with American, German, French, and Irish settlers arriving in the 1840s by boat or by wagon trail via the Santa Fe Trail, the Oregon route, or across the Nevada desert. Many traveled from the town of Sonoma to Carneros in search of farmland by horse, wagon, or foot through the region on the well-traveled Sonoma Highway (known today as Routes 12/121) which connected the Napa and Sonoma Valleys. Miners also passed through during the gold rush on their way to the Trinity Alps or the Sierra foothills. Throughout the 1850s and 1860s, a stagecoach traversed Carneros daily on its way from Sacramento to Petaluma.
As the Sonoma non-Mexican population grew, discontent with the Mexican government persisted. In 1846, a group of American frontiersmen overthrew Vallejo's forces in the famous Bear Flag Revolt. For a one-month period California existed as a republic until being annexed by the United States in 1848.

Carneros became an ideal location to raise livestock as well as cultivate wine grapes, pears, plums, apples, and apricots. Wharves emerged along the Napa River and Sonoma Creek and railroad stations were built in the late 1800s to accommodate the flow of fruit, milk, grain, cattle, and hay to the markets of San Francisco.
Grapes played a prominent role in Carneros agriculture in its infancy. The first Carneros winery was built in the early 1870s by Hoosier explorer William H. Winter, appropriately named Winter Winery.
The Carneros wine industry continued to thrive in the mid-1800s, but came to a grinding halt by the turn of the century due to phylloxera epidemics and the increasing popularity in prohibition of alcoholic beverages. Prohibition was formally enacted nationwide under the Eighteenth Amendment to the United States Constitution, ratified on January 16, 1919, virtually destroying the industry shutting down most wineries and uprooting vineyards. Only a few local establishments survived producing sacramental wines or giving away product for home consumption.
Following the Repeal of Prohibition in 1933, John Garetto established the first post-Prohibition winery in Carneros at the present site of Bouchaine Vineyards. Shortly thereafter, Andre Tchelistcheff and Louis M. Martini pioneered the rebirth of Carneros by establishing it as a cool climate viticultural region. Martini purchased the old Stanly Ranch and began a replanting effort in 1942. Tchelistcheff, as Beaulieu Vineyards' winemaker, provided significant contributions to the techniques of cold fermentation, vineyard frost protection, malolactic fermentation, and the development of winemaking regions in Carneros, California, Oregon and Washington.

The 1960s heralded a new wave of vineyard development begun by Beaulieu Vineyards and local growers Rene di Rosa of Winery Lake Vineyard, Ira Lee, and the Sangiacomo family. By the 1970s, the Carneros region had more than 1,300 acres (526 ha) of vineyards and started to gain a reputation for the quality of the Chardonnays and Pinot noirs produced in its cool-climate terroir. This caught the attention of sparkling wine producers from Champagne and elsewhere. In the 1970s and continuing to this day, Francis Mahoney of Mahoney Vineyards and Fleur de California in conjunction with UC-Davis have conducted an ongoing series of clonal trials to determine the best Pinot noir grapes for the Carneros region. The 1980s saw a wave of investment and development in Los Carneros by producers such as Domaine Chandon, Domaine Carneros, Gloria Ferrer, Mumm Napa and Codorníu Napa that made Carneros one of the centers of California sparkling wine production. In the late 1980s, phylloxera returned to the Carneros region prompting extensive replanting efforts. In addition to taking advantage of better phylloxera-resistant rootstock, many Carneros producers also took the opportunity to plant some of the new French clones of Pinot noir and Chardonnay. The surging popularity of Chardonnay in the 1980s further stimulated plantings in the Carneros region. By the early 1990s, the region had over 6,000 acres (2,428 ha) planted.

== Terroir ==
=== Geography ===
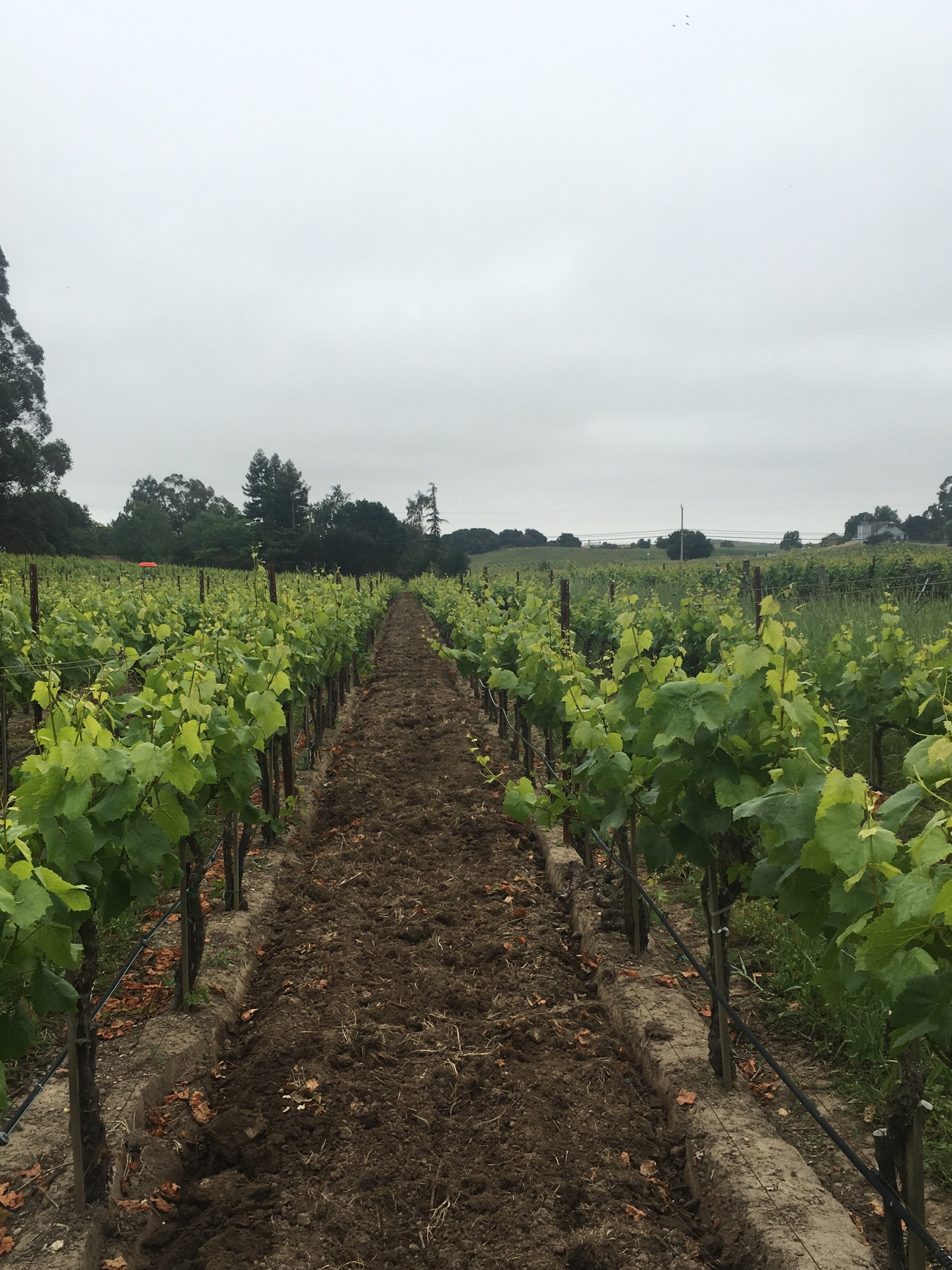
Chardonnay block under early morning fog on the Napa side of Los Carneros.

The Carneros region covers 90 square miles (58,000 acres) located along the low-lying hills of the Mayacamas range as it descends underneath San Francisco Bay. Elevations of most vineyards range from 400 feet (120 m) in the foothills to near sea level closer to the bay. The official boundaries of the AVA fall into both Napa and Sonoma counties with the largest portion being in Sonoma and entitled to use the Sonoma Valley AVA designation as well. The Napa portion of Los Carneros is similarly entitled to use the Napa Valley AVA designation. The region is moderately cool and windy with marked influences from nearby San Pablo Bay, making it the coolest and windiest AVA in both Napa & Sonoma where early morning fog is a persistent feature.

=== Climate ===
The climatic factors distinguishing Los Carneros from the surrounding areas are perhaps more significant then the soil differences. Los Carneros is an area of low hills and flatlands located at the northern end of San Pablo Bay; consequently, the climate of the area is profoundly affected by intrusion of cool, marine air from that body of water. The Beaulieu petition describes the climate as follows:

When compared to other parts of Napa Valley, Carneros has a long cool growing season. In general, the region...follows the San Pablo Bay. The close proximity of this water mass, greatly influences the daily temperatures, and generally results in a more moderate climate. Daytime highs are slightly lower than other parts of Naps Valley, and the Caneros region cools off in, i.e., afternoon faster than other parts of the Napa Vaiiey because of daily sea breezes. These cool ocean breezes rapidly drop the air temperature and vine temperature so that the vine docs not experience high afternoon temperatures during the Summer. Consequently, this makes for a cool growing season and also lengthens the growing season slightly. Because of the cool growing conditions in Carneros we have found bud break, and bloom, to be approximately 7-14 days behind our other Napa Valley vineyards. It has also been our experience that the Carneros region is too cool to adequately mature/ripen Cabernet Sauvignon grapes.

Other evidence establishes that the area is suited to early-ripening grape varieties such as Pinot Noir and Chardonnay. The Cannoisseur's Guide Handbook of California Wines states (p. 18): "Carneros Chardonnay hangs on the vines longer [than Chardonnay grown on the Napa Valley floor] and thus is capable of developing sugars in incremental steps while retaining high acid levels. The plant hardiness zone ranges from 9a to 10a.

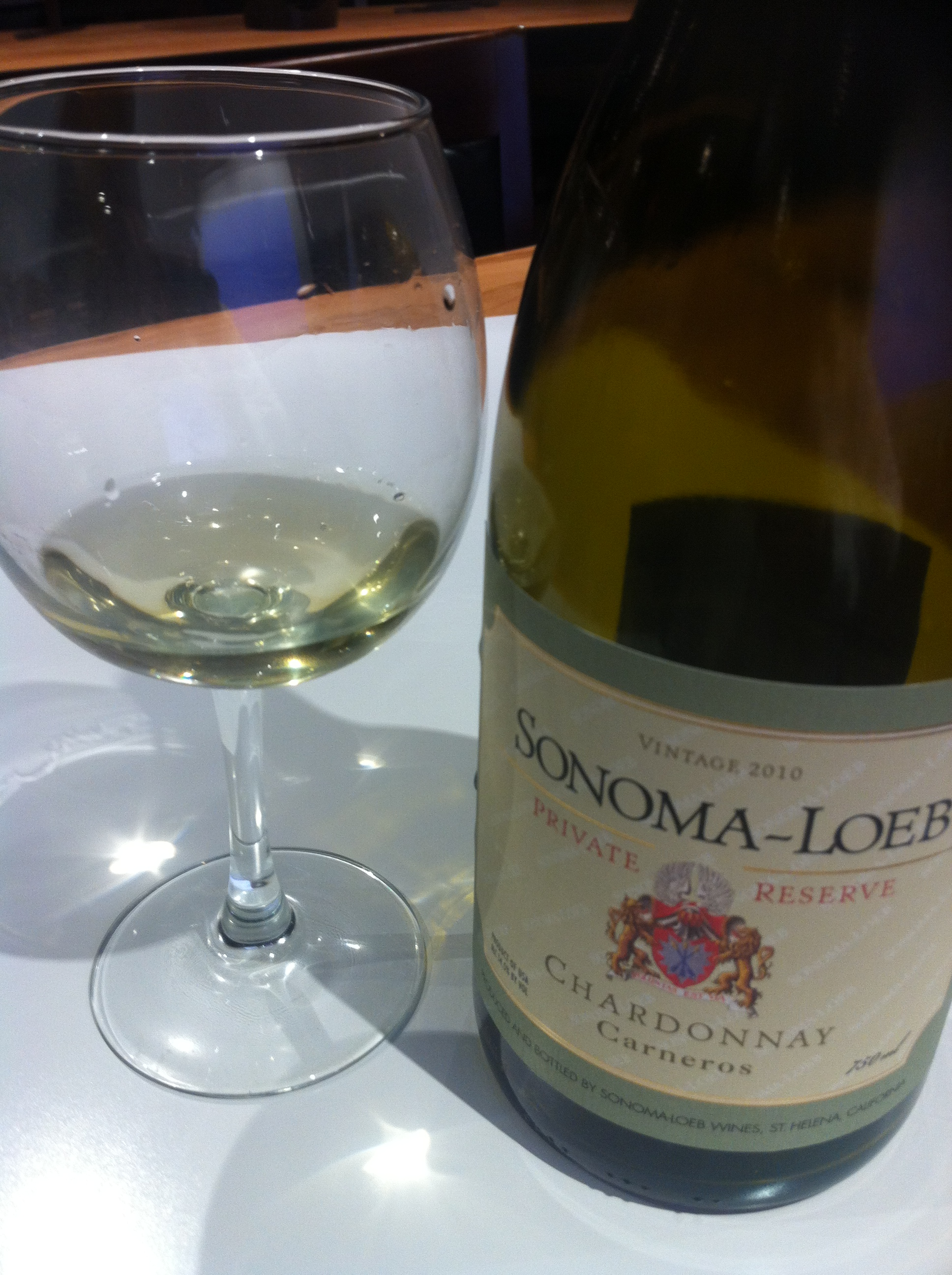
Carneros Chardonnay

=== Soils ===
Los Caneros is distinguished geographically from the surrounding areas on the basis of soil and climate. The soil types generally associated with Los Carneros are the Haire-Coombs/Diablo soils. Although these soils predominate in the Carneros area, they are rarely found elsewhere in the surrounding areas of either Napa Valley or Sonoma Valley. The soils are predominantly clay and very thin and shallow, approximately three-foot deep (1 m), providing poor drainage and fertility. The fierce and persistent winds coming off the bay encourages the grapevines to struggle and retain moisture. While this aids in keeping crop yields small, it can also delay the grapes from ripening sufficiently. In vintages with a long, drawn out growing season that allow the grapes to ripen, intense and vivid flavors can develop.

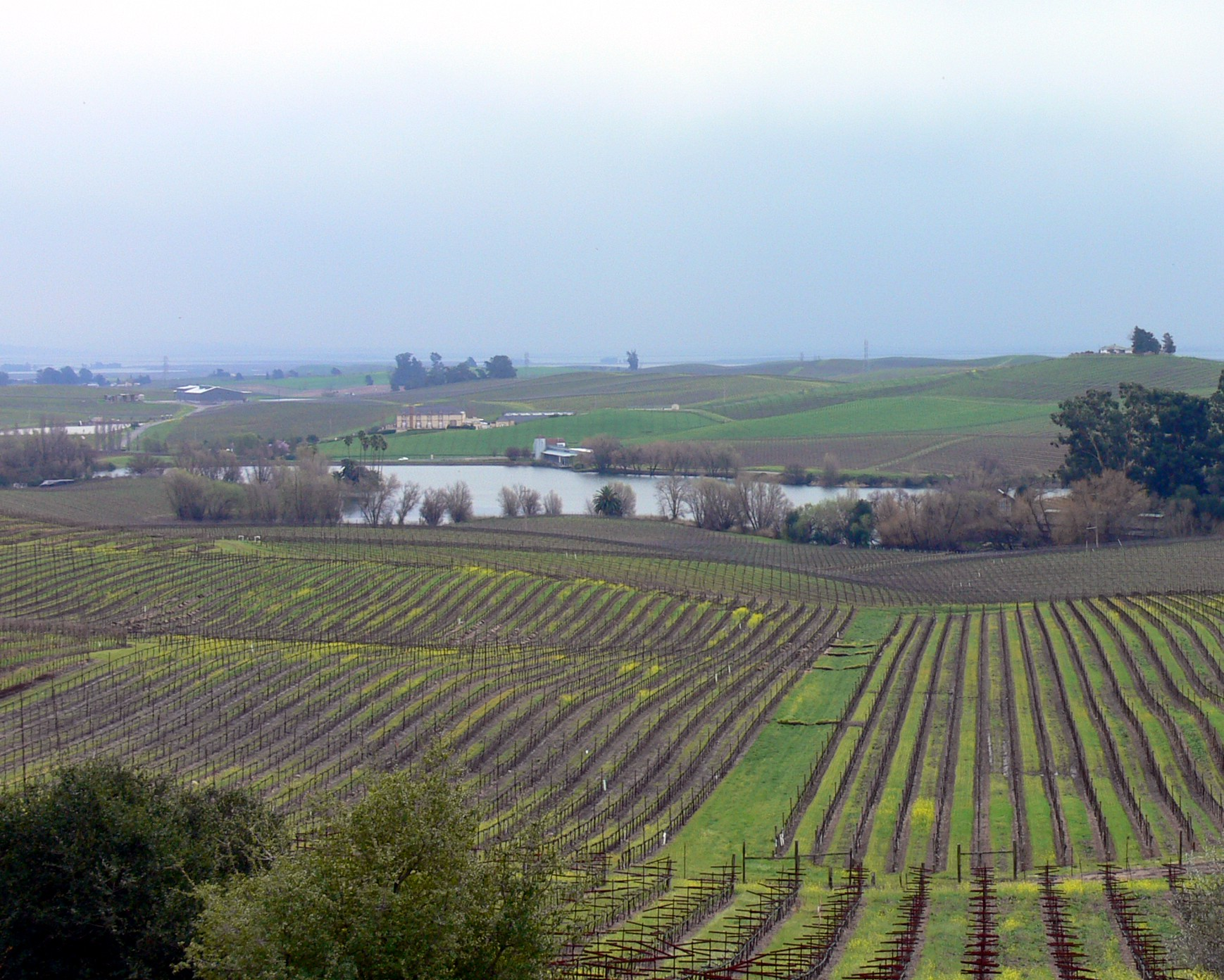
View of Los Carneros from Artesa Vineyards

== Viticulture ==
Los Carneros is primarily associated with the cool-climate wines such as Chardonnay and Pinot noir, as well as the sparkling wines made from those grapes. Many wineries in Napa & Sonoma use Carneros grapes as a cool-climate blending component. In recent years there has been interest in Merlot and Syrah coming from the warmer areas of the region. In 1996, the first possible plantings of Albarino in the United States were planted in the Carneros region.

Carneros Chardonnay is marked by its high acidity that can bring balance to the fatter, rounder Chardonnays produced in the warmer climate areas of Sonoma and Napa. While in the past, chardonnay was usually put through malolactic fermentation and was given significant oak treatment to soften some of the acidity, the current winemaking style in California emphasizes the fruit. The style now favors stainless steel and neutral French Oak, while rarely using more than a portion of the wine undergoing malolactic fermentation.

Pinot noir from the Carneros is known for its crisp acidity and tight structure and frequently exhibits spicy berry fruit. The Carneros region was one of the early pioneers of cool-climate Pinot noirs in California-long before it became a significant planting in the Russian River Valley, Anderson Valley, Sta. Rita Hills and Santa Lucia Highlands AVAs. In recent years there has been a focus by Carneros Pinot noir producers on the changing style of the region's Pinot due, in part, on emerging modern philosophies in winemaking and on clonal selections. The older clones found in Carneros include the Martini and Swan clones which produce wines that are lighter, more elegant with some earthy complexity. They are also noted for their distinctive aromas of green herbs, beets and mint. The newer French clones being planted, (such as the Dijon 115, 667 and 777) produce more alcoholic and concentrated wines with black fruit notes.

== Light brown apple moth sightings ==
In August 2008, two light brown apple moths were discovered in the Carneros region close to the Napa County line. The pests lay eggs on grape leaves and the resulting larvae feed on the leaves and fruit clusters, leaving them prone to rot. Thus, their discovery caused concern that parts of the Carneros region may be quarantined just before the busy harvest season. Proposals on how to eradicate the vineyard pest have been met with controversy, debate and legal challenges.
