= Orrs Creek =

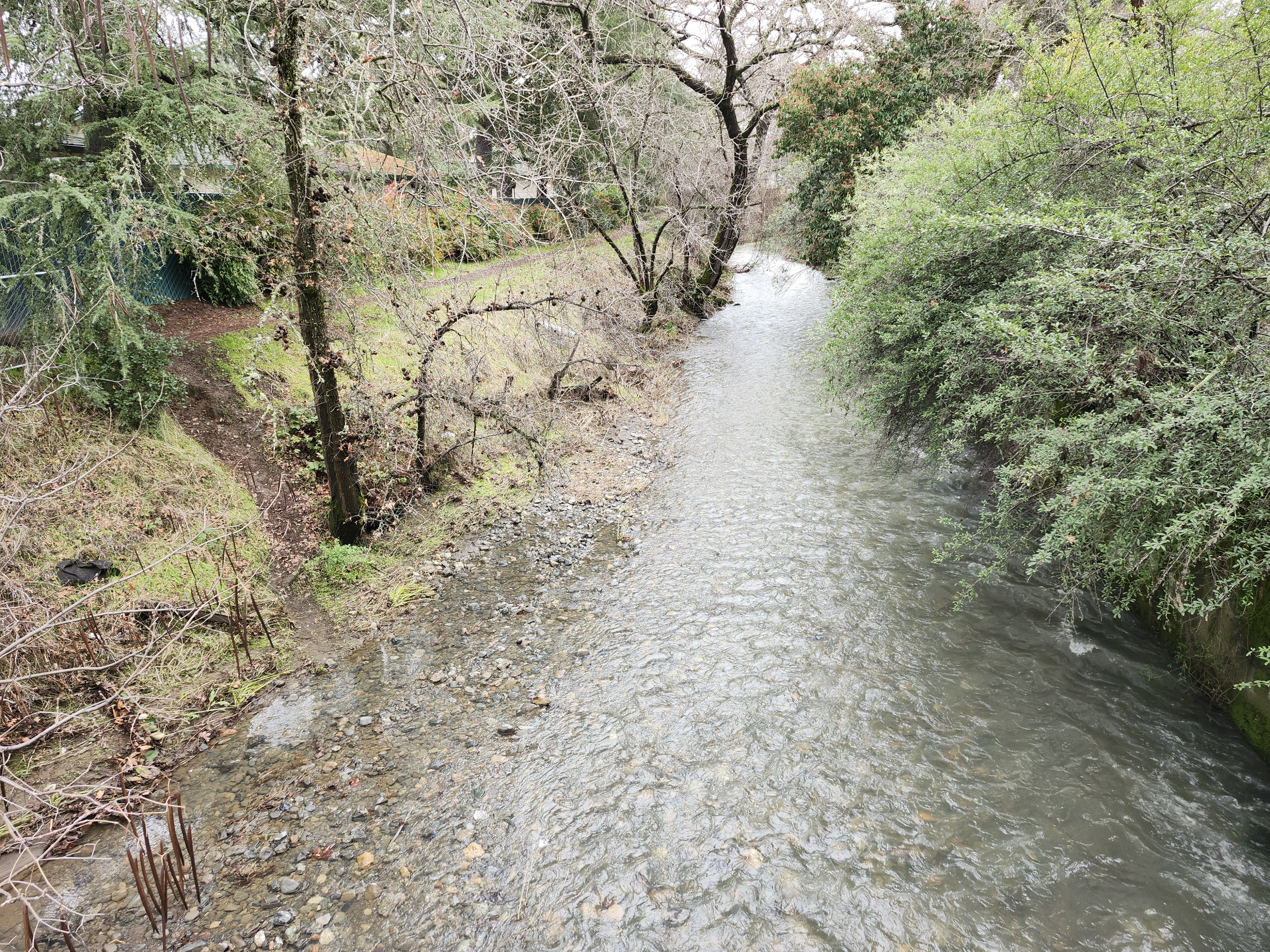
- Orrs Creek in Ukiah

Location
- Country: United States
- State: California
- Region: Mendocino County

Physical characteristics
- Source
  - location: 3.1 mi (5.0 km) west of Ukiah, California
  - coordinates: 39°08′37″N 123°15′59″W
- Mouth: Russian River (California)
  - location: 1.1 mi (1.8 km) Northeast of Ukiah, California
  - coordinates: 39°12′56″N 123°45′56″W
  - elevation: 594 ft (181 m)

Basin features
- Cities: Ukiah

Orrs Creek (also known as Orr Creek) is a 8-mile-long (13 km) westward-flowing stream in Mendocino County, California that empties into Russian River near the city of Ukiah, California. The stream serves as a greenway for recreation and wildlife.
