= Rio Nido (disambiguation) =

Rio Nido is an American jazz vocal group.

Rio Nido may also refer to:

- Rio Nido, California, a small unincorporated resort community on the Russian River in Sonoma County, California, U.S.
- Esteban Río Nido, a pseudonym of Stephen Sondheim when he wrote The Boy From...
