= Green Valley Creek =

Stream in California

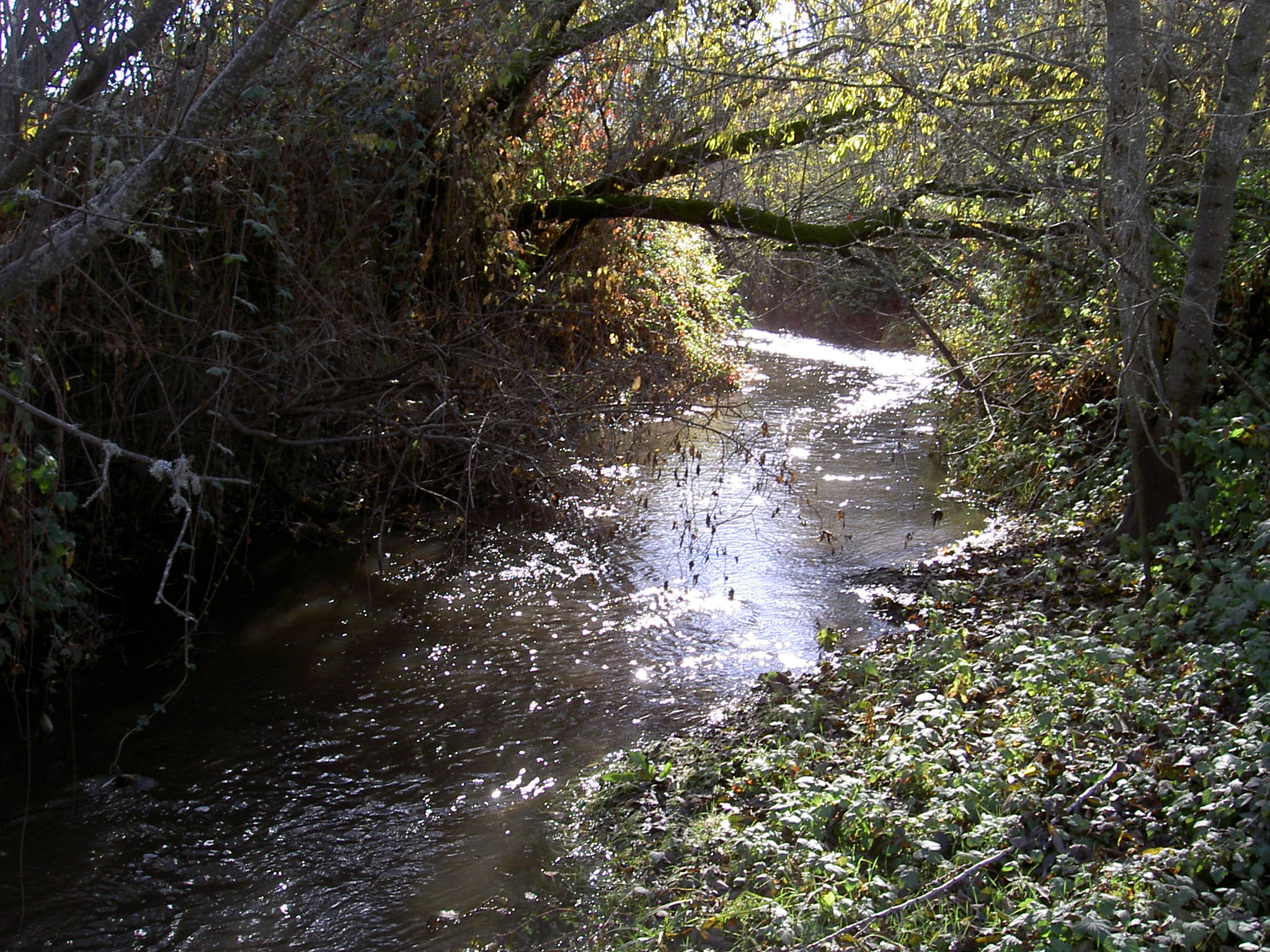
- Green Valley Creek below the Atascadero Creek confluence

- Location of the mouth of Green Valley Creek in California

Location
- Country: United States
- State: California
- Region: Sonoma County

Physical characteristics
- Source
  - location: 2 mi (3 km) north of Camp Meeker, California
  - coordinates: 38°27′25″N 122°57′0″W
  - elevation: 645 ft (197 m)
- Mouth: Russian River
  - location: 2 mi (3 km) north of Forestville, California
  - coordinates: 38°30′17″N 122°54′31″W
  - elevation: 43 ft (13 m)

Basin features
- Tributaries
  - right: Atascadero Creek, Purrington Creek

Green Valley Creek is a 10.7-mile-long (17.2 km) stream in Sonoma County, California, United States, which springs from the hills above the Bohemian Grove and is a tributary of the Russian River.

== Course ==
Green Valley Creek originates on a ridge east of Bohemian Grove, about 2 miles (3.2 km) north of the town of Camp Meeker. It descends initially to the east, crossing under Green Valley Road, then following the road southeastward for about 1.5 miles (2 km), then crossing under it again. After continuing further to the southeast, the creek curves northward to a confluence with Purrington Creek about 1.5 miles (2 km) west of the town of Graton. It continues generally northward, crossing Green Valley Road a third time to reach a confluence with Atascadero Creek, then crossing Ross Station Road. After a westward jog, the creek resumes its northward course, crossing State Route 116 west of the town of Forestville. It follows Martinelli Road north to the town of Rio Dell, where it empties into the Russian River.

== Gallery ==
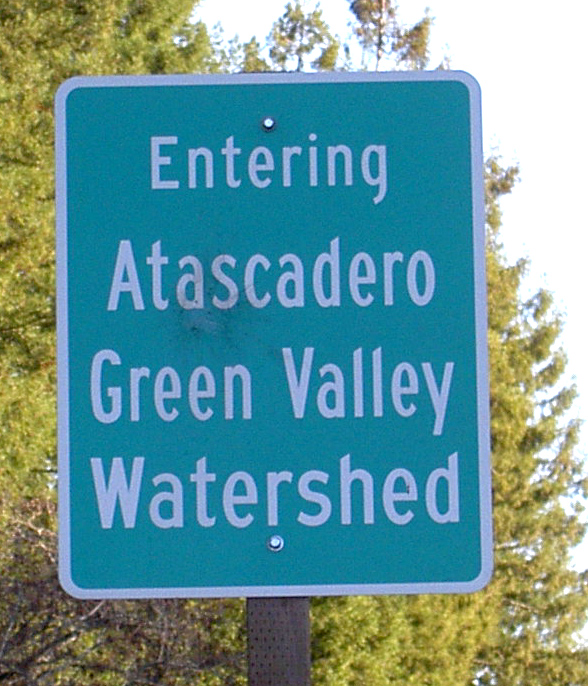
Sign marking entry into Green Valley Creek watershed

== See also ==
- Green Valley of Russian River Valley AVA
- List of watercourses in the San Francisco Bay Area
