= Guerneville, California =

Guerneville
- Census-designated place
- Location in Sonoma County and the state of California
- Coordinates: 38°30′23″N 122°59′27″W
- Country: United States
- State: California
- County: Sonoma

Area
  - Total: 9.879 sq mi (25.587 km^{2})
  - Land: 9.709 sq mi (25.147 km^{2})
  - Water: 0.170 sq mi (0.440 km^{2}) 1.72%
- Elevation: 59 ft (18 m)

Population (2020)
  - Total: 4,552
  - Density: 468.8/sq mi (181.0/km^{2})
- Time zone: UTC-8 (Pacific)
  - Summer (DST): UTC-7 (PDT)
- ZIP code: 95446
- Area code: 707
- FIPS code: 06-31470
- GNIS feature ID: 277527

Guerneville (/ˈɡɜːrnvɪl, -nivɪl/) is an unincorporated community and census-designated place (CDP) in the Russian River Valley of Sonoma County, California, United States. As of the 2020 census, Guerneville had a population of 4,552. The town is historically known as a logging community. It was founded by the Guerne family in the 1850s.

In the 21st century, Guerneville is also known for its natural environment, liberal atmosphere, and proximity to wine-tasting and redwood forests.

== History ==
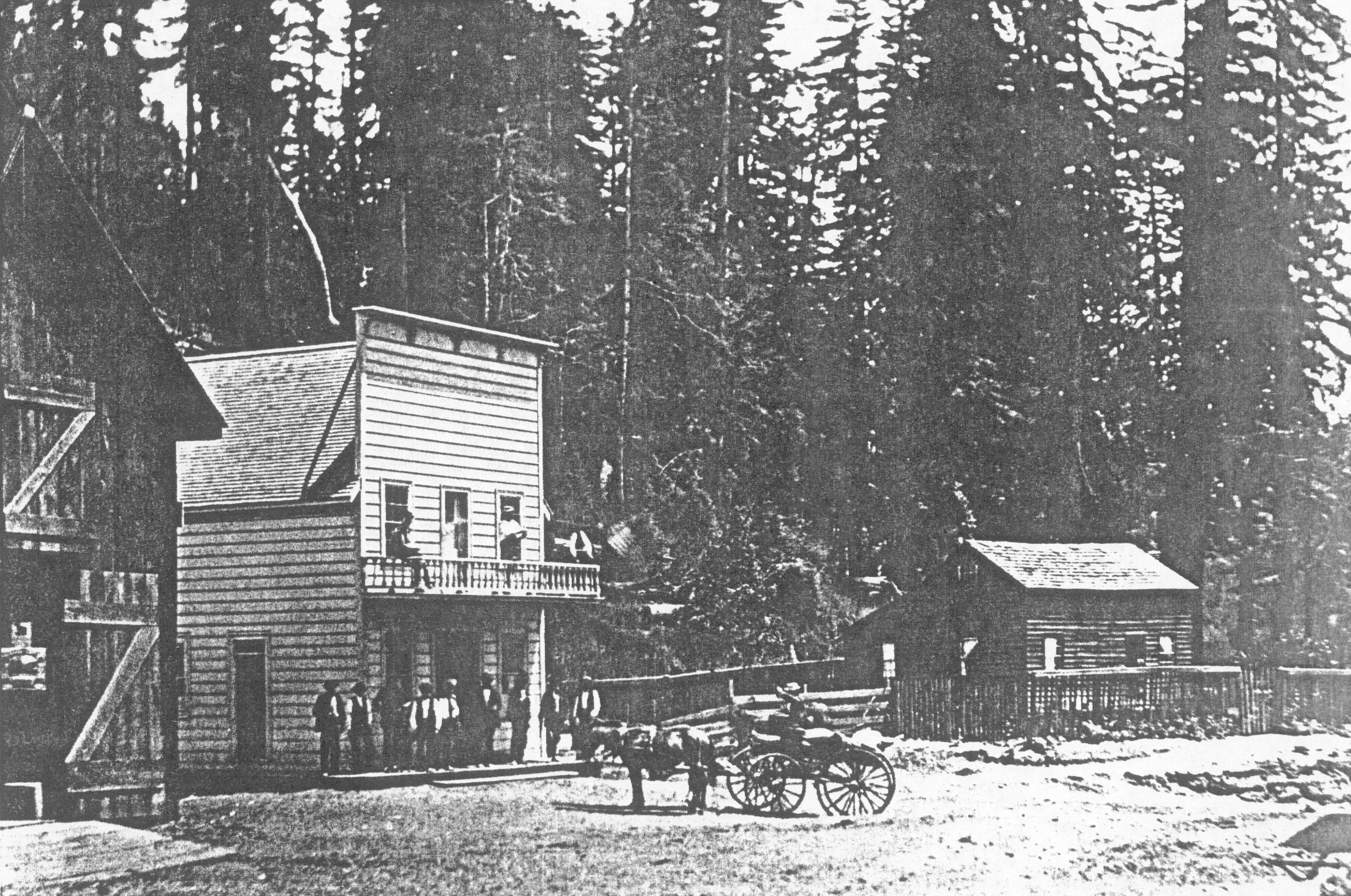
Hiram Epperly's Saloon in Guerneville, 1875

Guerneville developed adjacent to the Russian River. Redwoods grew in the riverbed with such vigor that just a few centuries ago, the valley had the greatest biomass density on the planet, according to local lore. The local Pomo Indians had long used the area as a summer camp and called it "Ceola" (/ˈsiːoʊleɪ/ or cee-oh-lay) which meant "shady place."

A large stand of ancient trees is preserved in the Fife Creek watershed, now the centerpiece of Armstrong Woods Park. But many of the trees were logged in the late 19th century and the early 20th century, giving rise to the first English name for the place – "Stumptown." Logging in the area boomed after vast amounts of lumber were needed for rebuilding after the 1906 earthquake and associated fires.

The annual town parade still commemorates the old place name by calling itself "Stumptown Days." The present name Guerneville was introduced to honor Swiss immigrant George Guerne, a local businessman of the 19th century who owned the town's sawmill. By 1870, there was a U.S. Post Office in Guerneville; it was listed by the name "Guerneville". Although locals may be found selling T-shirts that say "Don't call it Guerneyville" (alluding to the "GURN-vil" pronunciation), many have called the town "Guerneyville" in spelling and pronunciation since the 1800s. The extensive redwood forests on the surrounding mountains are less than 200 years old, having been replacement plantings for much of the logging done in the 19th century.

In the late 19th century, the area became popular with wealthy vacationers from San Francisco, and surrounding communities. The San Francisco and North Pacific Railroad in 1877 linked the town to the ferries of San Francisco Bay. Even with the demise of train service in the late 1930s, the area's resorts remained popular with vacationers who came by automobile through the 1950s. A local movie theater, the River, was built near the beach and showed double features throughout the 1950s and 1960s.

The advent of jet airplane travel in the 1960s marked a period of decline for many of the older resorts. Winter floods in 1964 caused a further decline in local businesses. A renaissance took place in the late 1970s as numerous gay entrepreneurs from San Francisco identified the area as a prime recreational destination for weekends. Many older resorts benefited from increased tourism, and the town's businesses began to thrive.

== Geography ==
Guerneville is located in western Sonoma County, along the Russian River on State Route 116, between Monte Rio to the west and Forestville to the east.

The CDP has a total area of 9.88 sq mi (25.6 km^{2}). Of that, 9.71 sq mi (25.1 km^{2}) is land and 0.17 sq mi (0.4 km^{2}) (1.72%) is water.

=== Climate ===
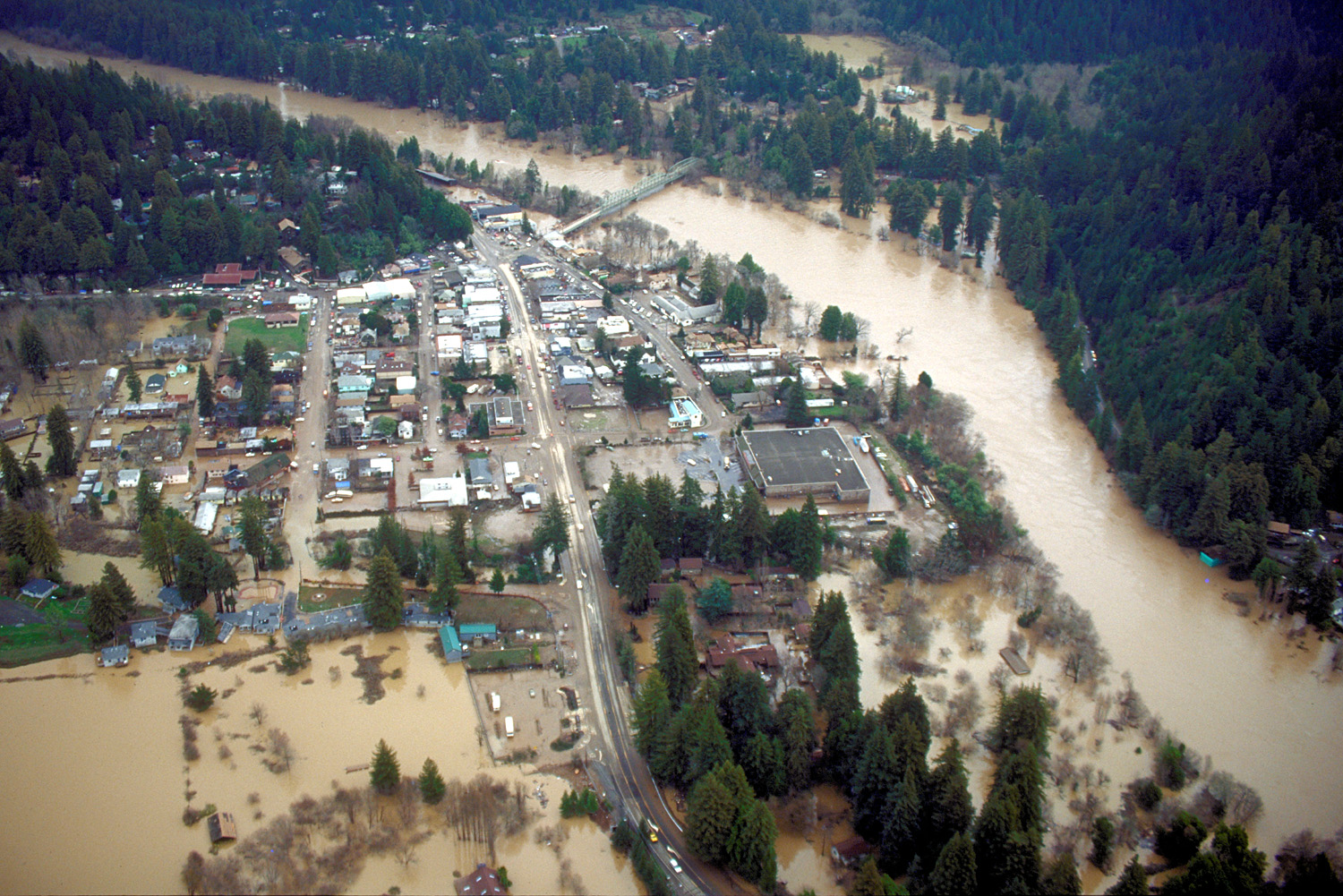
Aerial view of Guerneville during flooding on the Russian River

Guerneville has cool, wet winters and warm, dry summers, a climate typical of northern coastal California. Although rainfall is rare during the summer months, fog often comes up the river from the Pacific Ocean. The associated condensation creates "fog drip," which sustains the numerous redwood trees, ferns, and other vegetation.

The National Weather Service reports that Guerneville has an average annual rainfall of 49.15 inches (1,248 mm). Measurable precipitation occurs on an average of 73 days each year. The wettest year was 1970 with 70.2 inches (1,780 mm) and the driest year was 1949 with 31.34 inches (796 mm). The most rainfall in one month was 29.08 inches (739 mm) in January 1970. The most rainfall in 24 hours was 8.4 inches (210 mm) on February 8, 1960.

Although no official temperature records exist for Guerneville, the nearby town of Graton has average January temperatures ranging from 35.7 to 56.1 °F (2.1 to 13.4 °C), and July temperatures from 48.4 to 83.5 °F (9.1 to 28.6 °C). There are an average of 28.7 days annually with highs of 90 °F (32 °C) or higher and 44.7 days annually with lows of 32 °F (0 °C) or lower. The record high temperature was 113 °F (45 °C) on July 14, 1972, and the record low temperature was 14 °F (−10 °C) on December 22, 1990. Other nearby cooperative National Weather Service stations are in Occidental, Cazadero, and Fort Ross.

== Demographics ==
Guerneville first appeared as a census designated place in the 1980 U.S. census.

The CDP includes areas outside Guerneville proper, some of which (e.g., Rio Nido, Guernewood Park, Korbel, and Vacation Beach) are often considered separate communities by local residents.

=== Racial and ethnic composition ===
Guerneville CDP, California – Racial and ethnic composition Note: the US Census treats Hispanic/Latino as an ethnic category. This table excludes Latinos from the racial categories and assigns them to a separate category. Hispanics/Latinos may be of any race.
Race / Ethnicity (NH = Non-Hispanic)	Pop 2000	Pop 2010	Pop 2020	% 2000	% 2010	% 2020
White alone (NH)	1,958	3,665	3,333	80.21%	80.83%	73.22%
Black or African American alone (NH)	13	29	59	0.53%	0.64%	1.30%
Native American or Alaska Native alone (NH)	14	49	57	0.57%	1.08%	1.25%
Asian alone (NH)	14	45	44	0.57%	0.99%	0.97%
Native Hawaiian or Pacific Islander alone (NH)	5	10	1	0.20%	0.22%	0.02%
Other race alone (NH)	4	20	41	0.16%	0.44%	0.90%
Mixed race or Multiracial (NH)	78	163	294	3.20%	3.60%	6.46%
Hispanic or Latino (any race)	355	553	723	14.54%	12.20%	15.88%
Total	2,441	4,534	4,552	100.00%	100.00%	100.00%

Historical population
Census	Pop.	Note	%±
1880	363		—
1940	1,089		—
1980	1,525		—
1990	1,966		28.9%
2000	2,467		25.5%
2010	4,534		83.8%
2020	4,552		0.4%
2023 (est.)	4,522	▼	−0.7%
U.S Census 1880, 1940, U.S. Decennial Census; 1860–1870 1880-1890; 1900 1910 1920; 1930 1940 1950; 1960 1970 1980; 1990 2000 2010; 2020

=== 2020 census ===
As of the 2020 census, Guerneville had a population of 4,552 and a population density of 468.8 inhabitants per square mile (181.0/km^{2}). The racial makeup of Guerneville was 77.2% White, 1.4% African American, 2.0% Native American, 1.1% Asian, 0.0% Pacific Islander, 5.6% from other races, and 12.7% from two or more races. Hispanic or Latino of any race were 15.9% of the population.

The census reported that 97.6% of the population lived in households, 2.4% lived in non-institutionalized group quarters, and no one was institutionalized. Of residents, 0.0% lived in urban areas and 100.0% lived in rural areas.

There were 2,110 households, out of which 17.0% included children under the age of 18, 32.2% were married-couple households, 12.2% were cohabiting couple households, 27.8% had a female householder with no spouse or partner present, and 27.8% had a male householder with no spouse or partner present. 36.5% of households were one person, and 16.2% had someone living alone who was 65 years of age or older. The average household size was 2.11. There were 1,045 families (49.5% of all households).

The age distribution was 14.4% under the age of 18, 5.6% aged 18 to 24, 23.5% aged 25 to 44, 33.1% aged 45 to 64, and 23.4% who were 65 years of age or older. The median age was 49.9 years. For every 100 females, there were 112.2 males, and for every 100 females age 18 and over there were 113.8 males age 18 and over.

There were 3,095 housing units at an average density of 318.8 units per square mile (123.1 units/km^{2}), of which 2,110 (68.2%) were occupied. Of occupied units, 56.7% were owner-occupied and 43.3% were occupied by renters. Of all housing units, 31.8% were vacant. The homeowner vacancy rate was 1.9%, and the rental vacancy rate was 7.8%.

=== Income and poverty ===
In 2015, estimated median household income was $44,127, median family income was $53,250 and per capita income was $35,391, according to the 2011-15 American Community Survey (ACS), U.S. Census Bureau.

In 2023, the US Census Bureau estimated that the median household income in 2023 was $84,294, and the per capita income was $61,088. About 0.7% of families and 8.8% of the population were below the poverty line.

=== 2010 census ===
At the 2010 census Guerneville had a population of 4,534. The population density was 458.9 inhabitants per square mile (177.2/km^{2}). The racial makeup of Guerneville was 3,926 (86.6%) White, 31 (0.7%) African American, 68 (1.5%) Native American, 47 (1.0%) Asian, 12 (0.3%) Pacific Islander, 226 (5.0%) from other races, and 224 (4.9%) from two or more races. Hispanic or Latino of any race were 553 people (12.2%).

The census reported that 99.1% of the population lived in households and 0.9% lived in non-institutionalized group quarters.

There were 2,305 households, 407 (17.7%) had children under the age of 18 living in them, 583 (25.3%) were opposite-sex married couples living together, 197 (8.5%) had a female householder with no husband present, 112 (4.9%) had a male householder with no wife present. There were 175 (7.6%) unmarried opposite-sex partnerships, and 176 (7.6%) same-sex married couples or partnerships. 984 households (42.7%) were one person and 235 (10.2%) had someone living alone who was 65 or older. The average household size was 1.95. There were 892 families (38.7% of households); the average family size was 2.74.

The age distribution was 643 people (14.2%) under the age of 18, 306 people (6.7%) aged 18 to 24, 1,042 people (23.0%) aged 25 to 44, 1,932 people (42.6%) aged 45 to 64, and 611 people (13.5%) who were 65 or older. The median age was 48.2 years. For every 100 females, there were 119.8 males. For every 100 females age 18 and over, there were 119.3 males.

There were 3,343 housing units at an average density of 338.4 per square mile (130.7/km^{2}), of which 56.2% were owner-occupied and 43.8% were occupied by renters. The homeowner vacancy rate was 3.6%; the rental vacancy rate was 7.7%. 56.2% of the population lived in owner-occupied housing units and 42.9% lived in rental housing units.

=== 2000 census ===
As of 2000, 90% of Guerneville residents spoke English as their primary language, while 10% did not. Of these, 6% spoke Spanish, 1% spoke Russian, 1% spoke French, 1% spoke German, 1% spoke Portuguese, less than 1% spoke "other West Germanic languages," Tagalog and Thai.

== Economy ==
=== Tourism ===
Guerneville includes a plaza in the town center with permanent chess tables, and small shops. A public beach area along the Russian River is used for fishing, swimming, boating, and sunbathing.

==== LGBTQ+ community ====
Guerneville is an LGBTQ+ vacation destination, and hosts an annual Russian River Pride Parade and Celebration. Guerneville also hosts a Women's Weekend in the summer, and hosts gay bear charity events for the LGBTQ+ community, including Lazy Bear Weekend in late July or early August, and Polar Bear Weekend in mid-January. Guerneville is also home to the Russian River Sisters of Perpetual Indulgence, a chapter of the Sisters of Perpetual Indulgence, which holds entertainment events in various venues along the Russian River, including monthly bingo games.

There are several LGBT-friendly clubs and bars in Guerneville.

== Parks and recreation ==
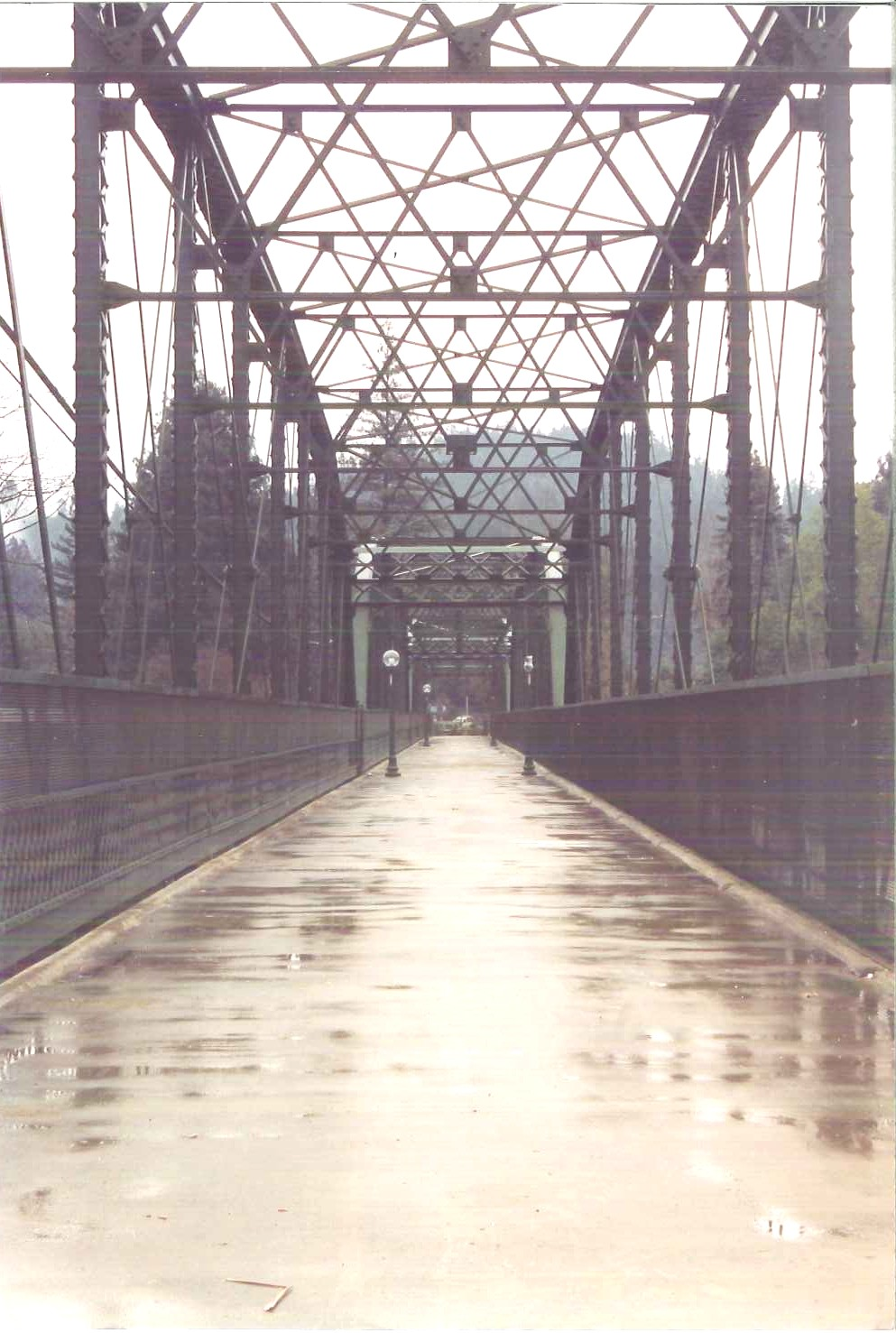
Old Russian River Bridge

Places of interest include Armstrong Redwoods State Natural Reserve and the adjacent Austin Creek State Recreation Area, the Russian River with its meandering flow and wildlife, Johnson's Beach, which hosted the Russian River Jazz and Blues festival In the past and provides summer swimming and boating, and the close proximity of the Pacific Ocean.

== Government ==
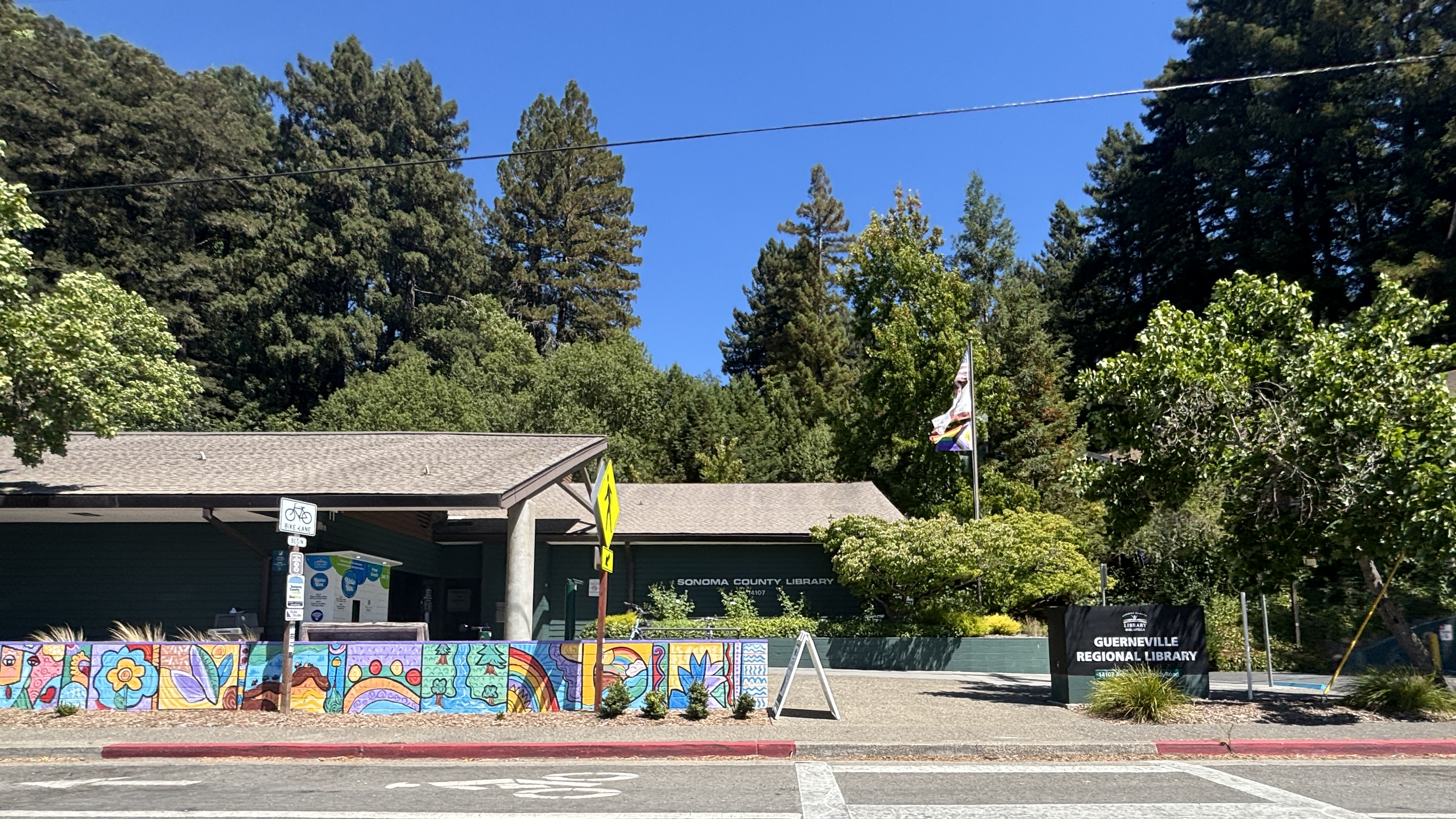
Guerneville Regional Library

In the California State Legislature, Guerneville is in the 2nd senatorial district, represented by Democrat Mike McGuire, and in the 2nd Assembly district, represented by Democrat Chris Rogers.

In the United States House of Representatives, Guerneville is in California's 2nd congressional district, represented by Democrat Jared Huffman.

== Education ==
The school districts are Guerneville Elementary School District and West Sonoma County Union High School District.

The Guerneville School District includes the Guerneville School, a K-8 school, established in 1949.

== Media ==
Guerneville/lower Russian River events receive daily coverage by the Santa Rosa Press Democrat's "hyperlocal" online Towns section.

Guerneville is the home of non-commercial radio station KGGV-FM, 95.1 MHz.

The Russian River area occasionally appears in local and/or national news due to significant winter flooding, the worst of which occurred in 1986. Because much of the housing is elevated, thanks in large part to FEMA grants, floods no longer have the impact they once did and recovery for most residents and businesses is much faster than in earlier times. The effects of floods are mitigated by the extensive upstream floodplain storage capacity of the Laguna de Santa Rosa.

== Filming location ==
Guerneville's older metal truss bridge can be filmed from the newer bridge, and made an appearance in the movie Mumford (1999) as a location for people to walk and talk in idyllic settings. The independent film Deep Dark Canyon (2012) was filmed in Guerneville. Surrounding communities were also regular filming locations for the 1960s television series Combat!
