= Big Sulphur Creek =

Stream in Sonoma County, California

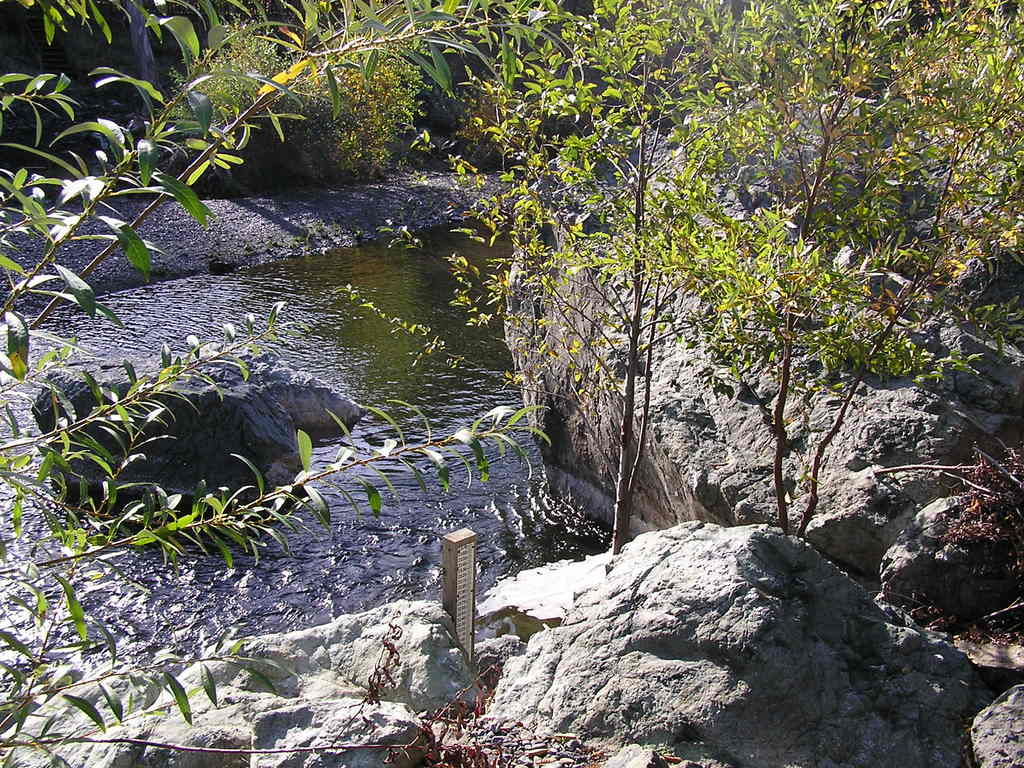
- A water monitoring station at Big Sulphur Creek

Location
- Country: United States
- State: California
- Region: Sonoma County

Physical characteristics
- Source: Pine Mountain
  - location: 12 mi (19 km) northeast of Healdsburg, California
  - coordinates: 38°44′58″N 122°42′47″W
- Mouth: Russian River
  - location: north of Cloverdale, California
  - coordinates: 38°49′6″N 123°0′39″W
  - elevation: 299 ft (91 m)
- Length: 20 mi (32 km)
- Basin size: 60 mi^{2} (160 km^{2})

Basin features
- Tributaries
  - left: Truitt Creek, Little Sulphur Creek
  - right: Hot Springs Creek, Cobb Creek, Squaw Creek, Frasier Creek

Big Sulphur Creek is a westward-flowing stream in northern Sonoma County, California, United States, which springs from The Geysers in the Mayacamas Mountains and runs 20 miles (32 km) to empty into the Russian River.

== Course ==
The creek originates on Pine Mountain in the Geysers area, near the Lake County line. It descends to the west, passing north of Sheepskin Rock. North of Mercuryville, it meets Geysers Road, which it parallels the rest of the way to the City of Cloverdale. After Hot Springs Creek and Cobb Creek enter from the right, Big Sulphur Creek passes Geysers Resort and Eagle Rock. Then Truitt Creek enters from the left, Squaw Creek and Frasier Creek enter from the right, and Little Sulphur Creek enters from the left. Big Sulphur Creek emerges into the northern end of Alexander Valley and empties into the Russian River 2 miles (3 km) north of Cloverdale.

== Watershed ==
The creek's drainage basin covers about 60 square miles (160 km^{2}) in the Mayacamas Mountains in northern Sonoma County.

== Habitat and pollution ==
When surveyed in 1973, Big Sulphur Creek supported snakes, salamanders, frogs, many kinds of fish (both steelhead and rainbow trout, Sacramento pikeminnow, suckers and roach), flies (trichoptera, diptera, hemiptera, plecoptera and odonata), and aquatic plants (sedges, cattails, and algae).

As of 2000, the creek and two of its tributaries (Little Sulphur Creek and Squaw Creek) still supported steelhead trout.

== Bridges ==
Big Sulphur Creek is spanned by two bridges:

- River Road crosses northeast of Cloverdale, California on a 212-foot (65 m) prestressed concrete span built in 1988.
- Geysers Road crosses 18.6 miles (30 km) north of State Route 128 on a 148-foot (45 m) steel truss built in 1909 and reconstructed in 1970.

== See also ==
- List of watercourses in the San Francisco Bay Area
