= Atascadero Creek (Sonoma County, California) =

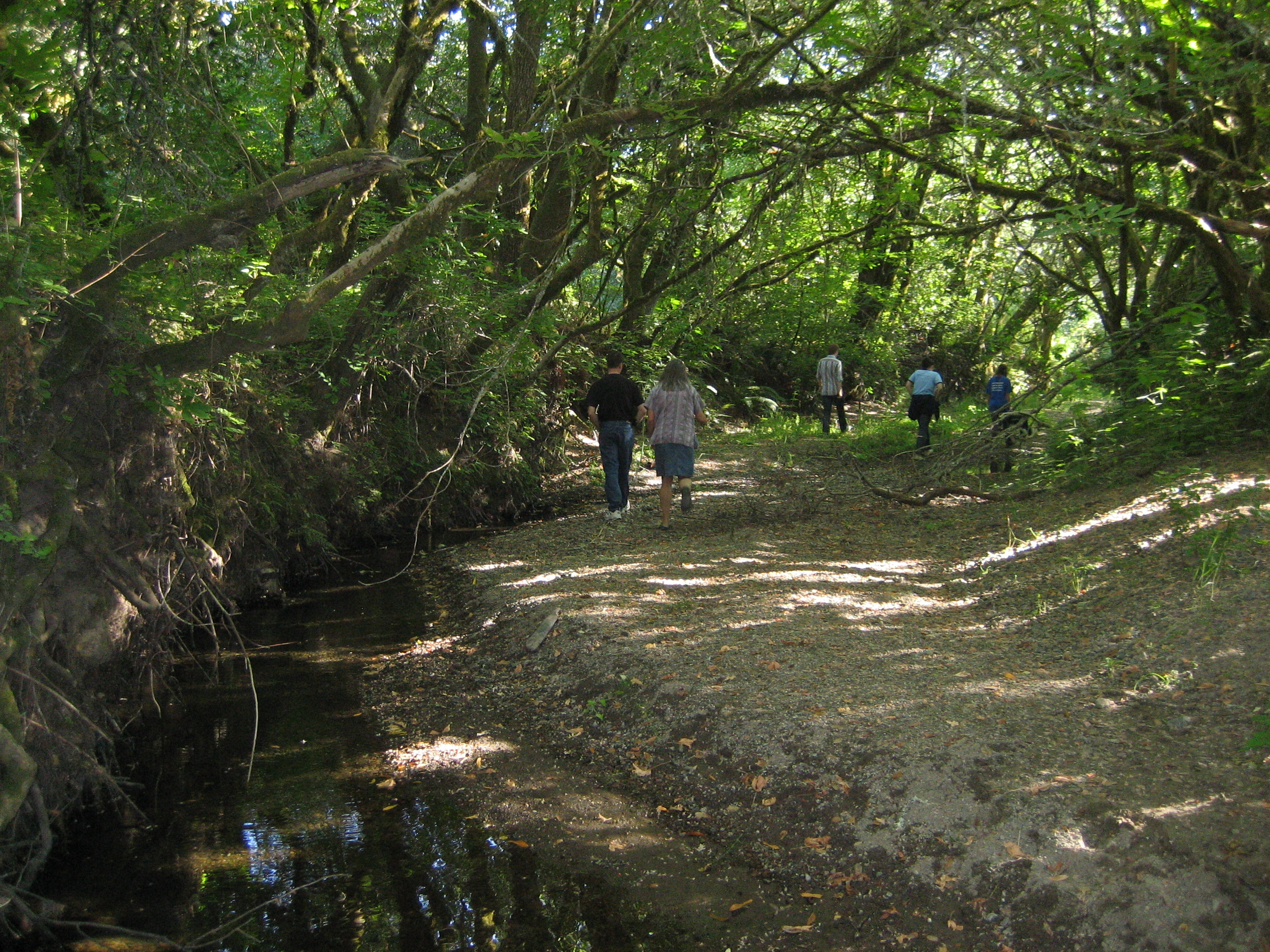

- Location of the mouth of Atascadero Creek in California
- Etymology: Spanish

Location
- Country: United States
- State: California
- Region: Sonoma County
- Cities: Graton, California, Sebastopol, California

Physical characteristics
- Source: English Hill
  - location: 3 mi (5 km) southwest of Sebastopol, California
  - coordinates: 38°20′50″N 122°51′48″W
  - elevation: 825 ft (251 m)
- Mouth: Green Valley Creek
  - location: 2 mi (3 km) northwest of Graton, California
  - coordinates: 38°26′54″N 122°53′13″W
  - elevation: 89 ft (27 m)

Atascadero Creek is an 8.8-mile-long (14.2 km) north-flowing stream in Sonoma County, California, United States, which empties into Green Valley Creek.

== Course ==
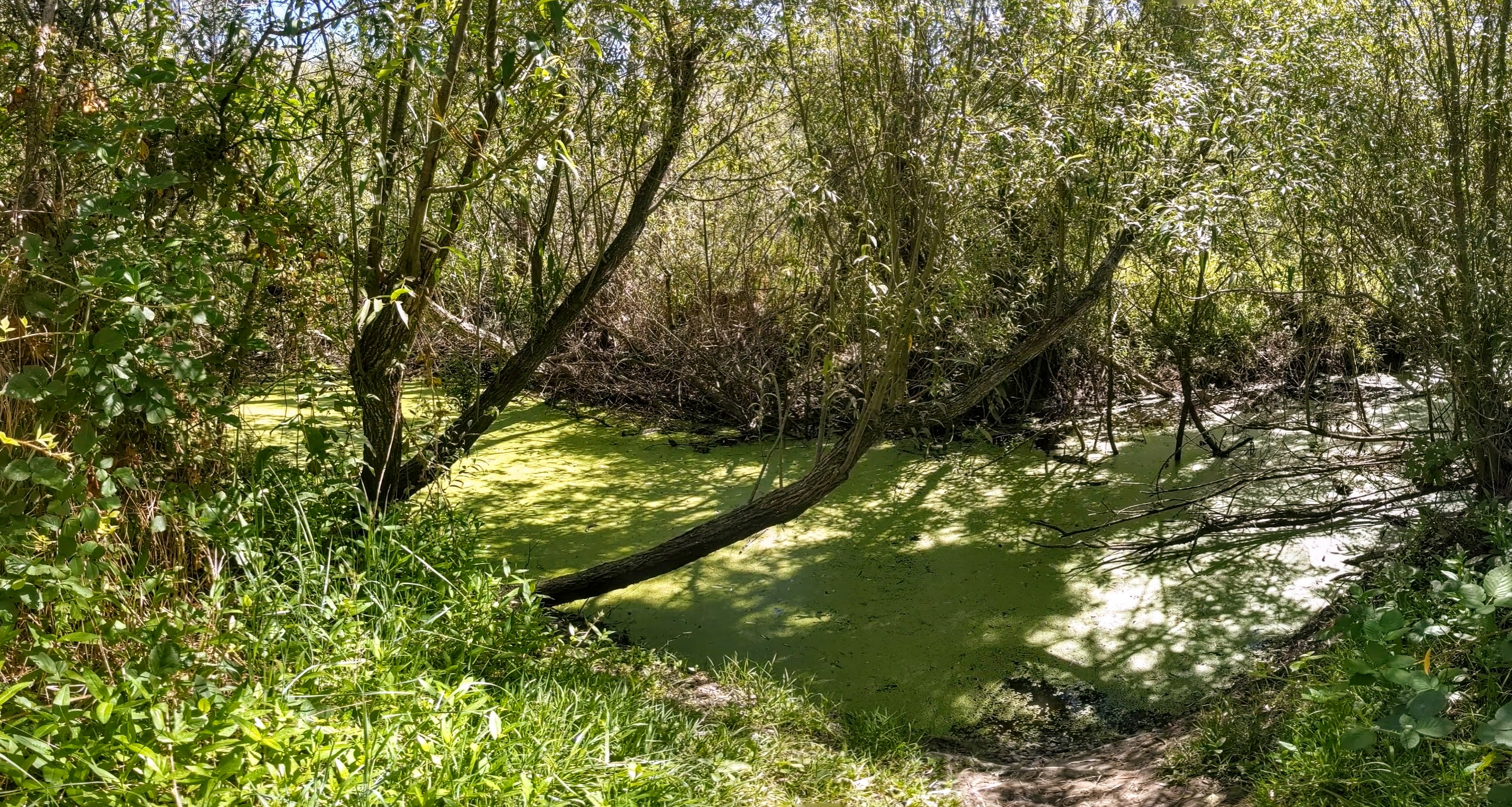
A swampy region of the creek in Ragle Ranch Regional Park in Sebastopol

Atascadero Creek springs from the north flank of English Hill, just north of Burnside Road, about 3 miles (5 km) southwest of Sebastopol. It descends to the north, flowing under Barnett Valley Road, Watertrough Road, and Bodega Highway. It continues north through Ragle Ranch Regional Park in the city of Sebastopol, then crosses Mill Station Road, Occidental Road, Graton Road, and Green Valley Road to enter Green Valley Creek about 2 mi (3 km) northwest of Graton. Atascadero Creek is the central channel of the Atascadero Wetland system, designated by the Army Corps of Engineers. It falls under increased protection with the 2015 “new rule” augmenting the 1972 Federal Clean Water Act. As a tributary to Green Valley Creek, Atascadero Creek and wetlands are part of the greater Russian River watershed.

== Habitat and pollution ==
As of 2000, Atascadero Creek and its major tributaries supported steelhead trout and California freshwater shrimp. The Atascadero is also historic spawning habitat for threatened steelhead salmon (Oncorhynchus mykiss) and endangered coho salmon (Oncorhynchus kisutch). Coho salmon are listed among the top ten endangered species under the federal Endangered Species Act. In 2001, a captive breeding program was established below Warm Springs Dam to restore their dwindling population.

== See also ==
- List of watercourses in the San Francisco Bay Area
