= Ragle Ranch Regional Park =

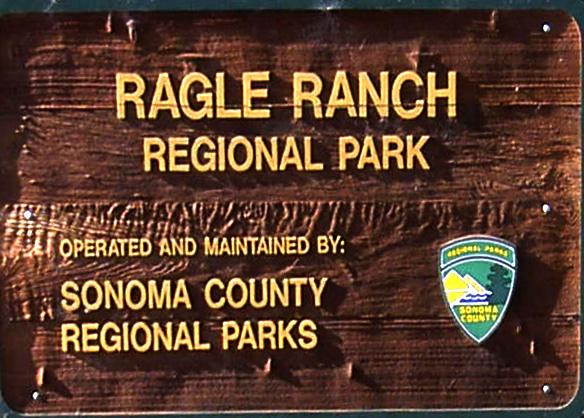
- Interactive map of Ragle Ranch Regional Park
- Type: regional park
- Location: Sebastopol, California, United States
- Coordinates: 38.4052°N 122.8511°W
- Area: 157 acres (64 ha)
- Operator: Sonoma County Regional Parks Department
- Open: Year round day use

Ragle Ranch Regional Park is a regional park in Sebastopol, California, U.S.A. that is maintained by the Sonoma County Regional Parks Department. It covers an area of 157 acres (64 ha) on the west side of town. The park entrance is at 500 Ragle Road, and the day use fee is $8 per vehicle.

== Facilities and features ==
The park features a paved loop path 0.83 mi (1.34 km) in circumference, plus secondary paved paths associated with a par course. Unpaved trails suitable for hiking, cycling, or horseback riding provide access to Atascadero Creek and its associated wetlands. The tennis courts, volleyball courts, baseball diamond, and six soccer fields are all located on the east side of the park, within sight of Ragle Road. The park includes both a Veterans Memorial Grove and a Peace Garden. Other amenities include a children's playground, picnic tables, barbecues, a gazebo, bathrooms, and a dog park. There is a small pond behind the bathrooms.

== Gallery ==
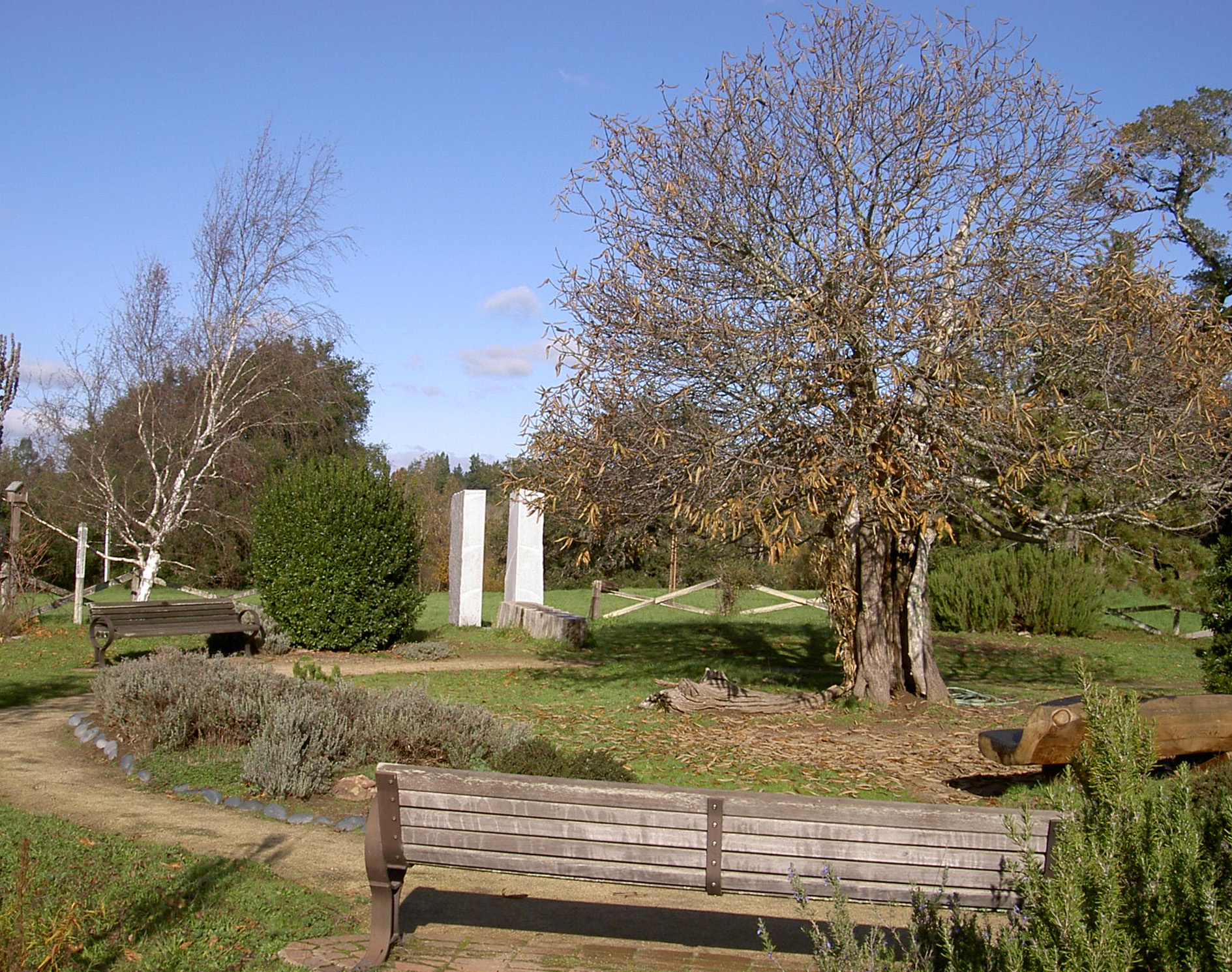
The Peace Garden

== See also ==
- List of Sonoma County Regional Parks facilities
