= Rio Nido, California =

Unincorporated community in California, United States

Rio Nido, California Rionido
- Unincorporated community
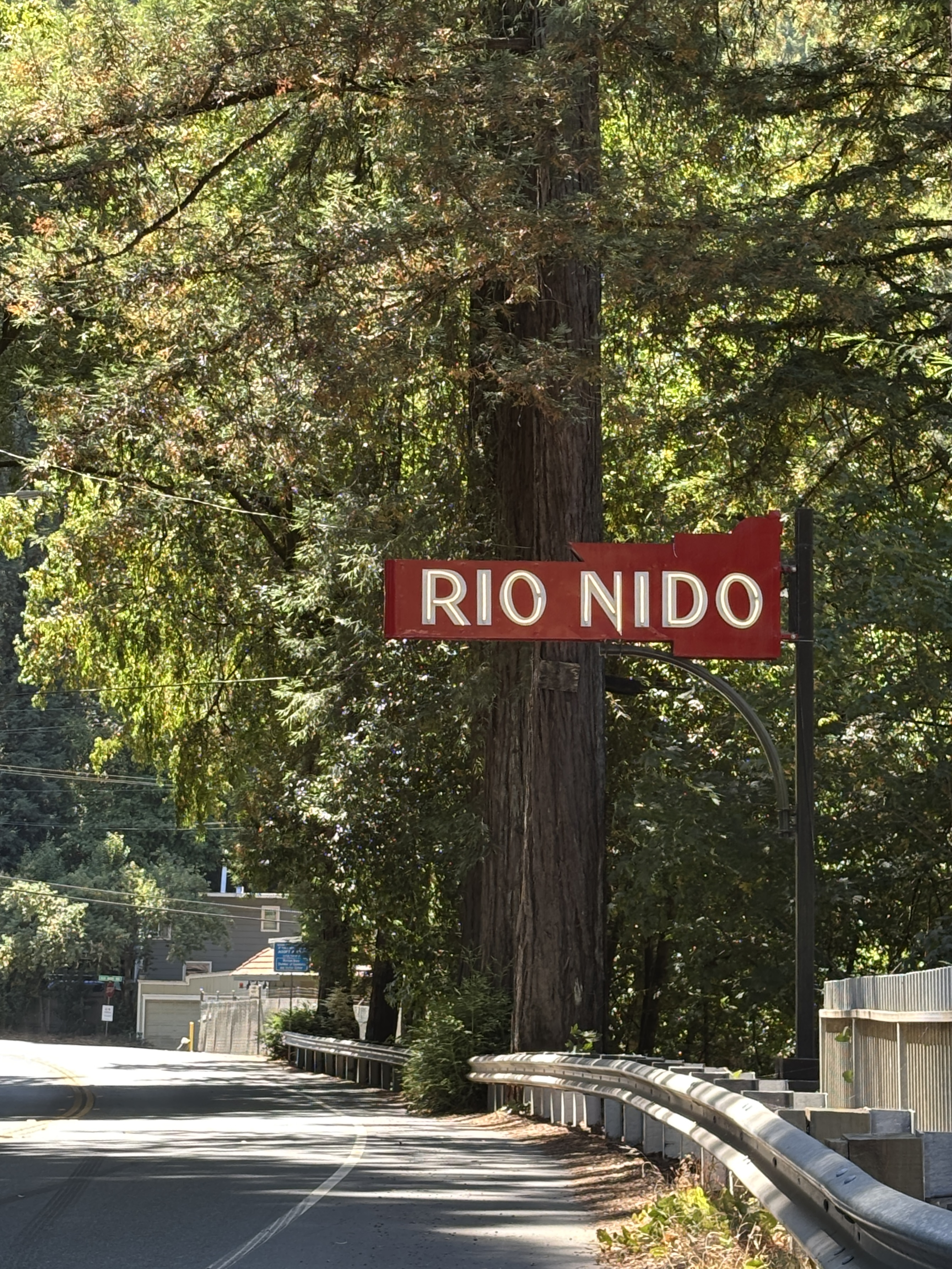

- Location within the state of California
- Coordinates: 38°31′16″N 122°58′37″W
- Country: United States
- State: California
- County: Sonoma
- Elevation: 75 ft (23 m)

Population (2010)
  - Total: 522
- Time zone: UTC−8 (PST)
  - Summer (DST): UTC−7 (PDT)
- ZIP Code: 95471
- Area code: 707
- FIPS code: 06-60956
- GNIS feature ID: 1659515

Rio Nido, California (From Spanish: Río Nido, meaning Nest River) is a small, unincorporated resort community on the Russian River, in Sonoma County, California, United States. It is situated 1.3 mi (2.1 km) east of Guerneville. The town's name means "river nest" in Spanish. One account has it that the name was originally the more grammatically correct "El Rio Del Nido", "referring to the nest of an eagle once seen in a tree on the banks of this stream". Rio Nido's unofficial slogans are "Memories That Linger" and "The Moon Is Always Out In Rio Nido".

As of 2010, Rio Nido has approximately 522 residents.

== Profile ==
Rio Nido's Post Office is a small unit on the side of its fire station. Its year-round population in 2000 was 296 persons and in 2010 it increased to 522 persons; typical of resort communities, the population increases in the summer. There were 179 housing units. The land area is only .1 square mile (.2 square kilometers).

Rio Nido consists of numerous summer homes and cabins, as well as a few small businesses- a bar/restaurant, public pool and a small resort hotel. Most of the homes are located in a redwood canyon which contains a small creek that flows into the Russian River, Rio Nido Creek. The main roads are named Canyons One, Two, Three, Four, Six and Seven. There is no Canyon Five, because of an accident that happened on Canyon Six (that was going to be Canyon Five).

The property comprising Rio Nido was purchased in 1908 as a single plot by the Eagle Lodge in San Francisco, and then it was broken up into parcels for Eagle Lodge members. The post office for Eaglenest, as the village was originally known, opened in 1908. The name was changed to "Rionido" in 1910. During World War II a number of facilities were added to accommodate the huge crowds of sailors on liberty and soldiers and Marines in transit to the war in the Pacific. The Big Band era was in full swing and the Russian River area was a well-known recreation area. Many famous bands appeared in Rio Nido's dance hall. The "Rionido" post office was changed to "Rio Nido" in 1947. The San Francisco Chronicle once reported the extended appearance in Rio Nido by singer-actress Betty Hutton. Rio Nido is about 5 miles (8 km) north of the famed Bohemian Grove.

During the 1950s and the 1960s, a footbridge crossed the river to a public beach on the south shore. A small excursion boat regularly cruised between the Rio Nido beach and Johnson's Beach in Guerneville. A snack bar was maintained on the beach. Canoe rentals were available through Bob "W.C. Bob" Trowbridge, who also served as a Sonoma County sheriff's deputy and the head of the Sonoma County and State Democratic Central Committee for 38 years. Loudspeakers were set up around the square and on the beach, playing music from KSRO in Santa Rosa. A few cabins were available for rent. On summer evenings Dick Crest (1930-2010), a teacher and band director at the College of San Mateo, led a small orchestra in free concerts in the town square and at dances. By 1974, the beach had been abandoned and overgrown with weeds. The pedestrian tunnel from Canyon 2 Road under River Road now leads to a restored foot path to the Russian River, and to the riverfront area known as the Harris Waterfront. The latter is owned by the Russian River Recreation and Park District.

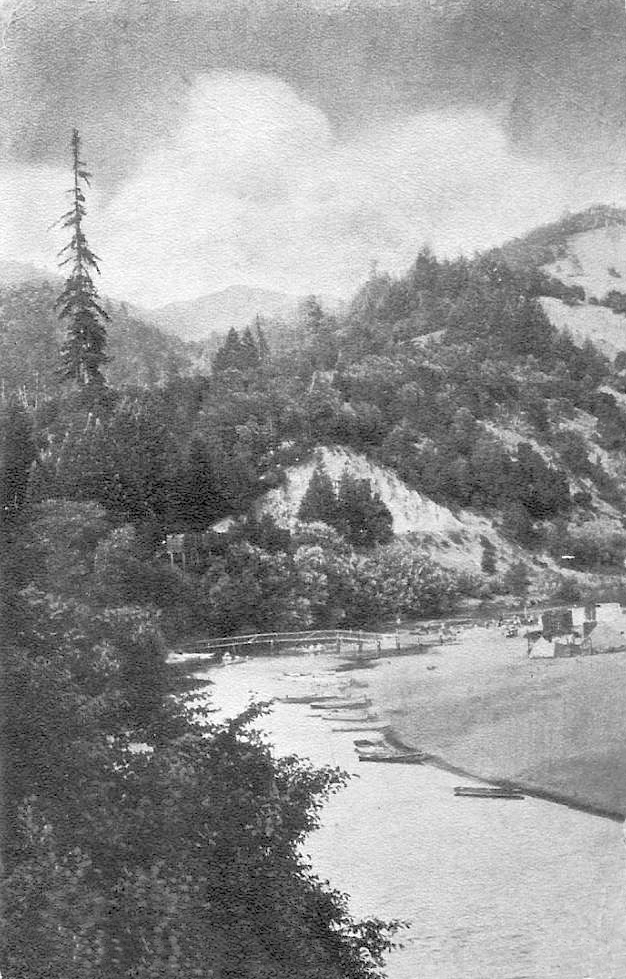
Russian River at Rio Nido, c. 1910s

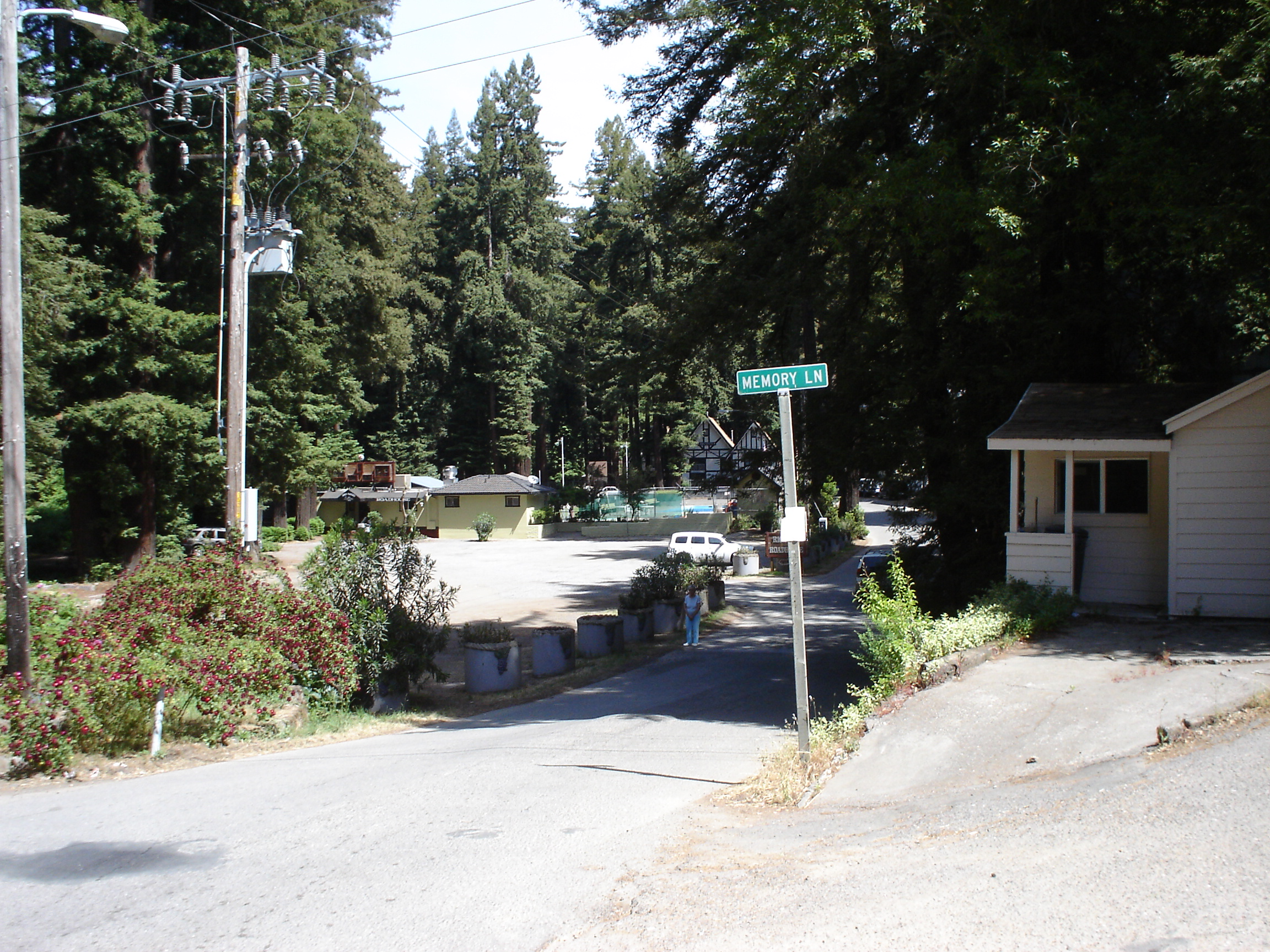
Village Square, Rio Nido, May 2008

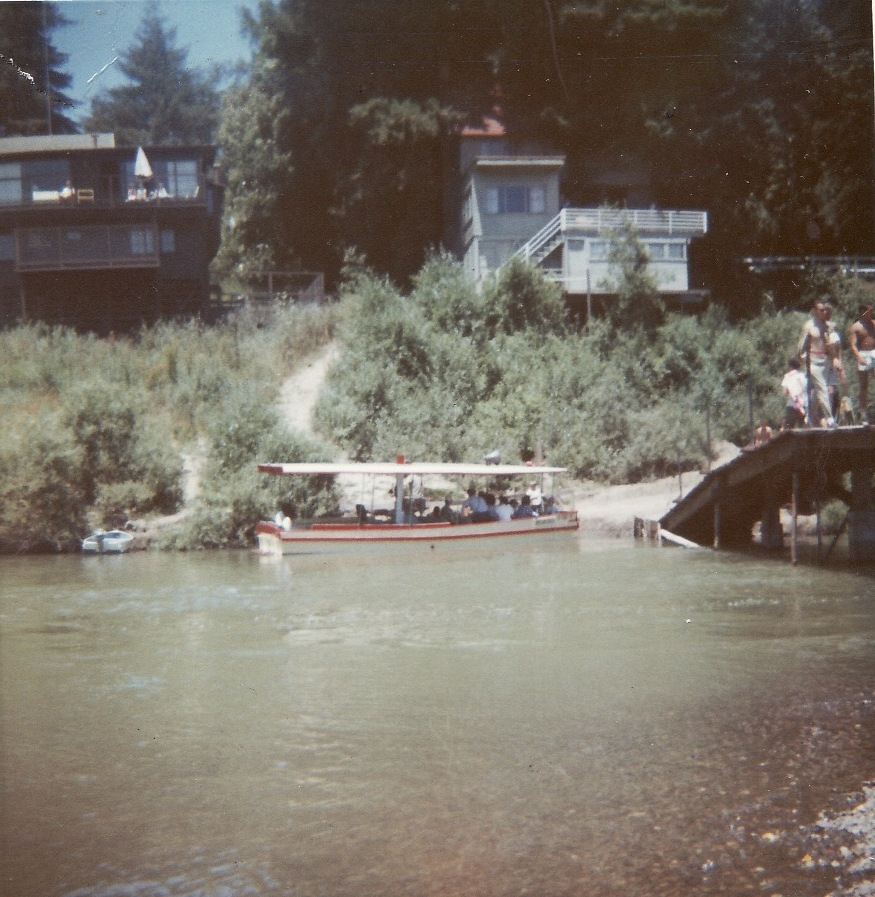
Rio Nido beach, 1963. It has since been abandoned and the bridge dismantled. The path that led to the bridge is now virtually impassable.

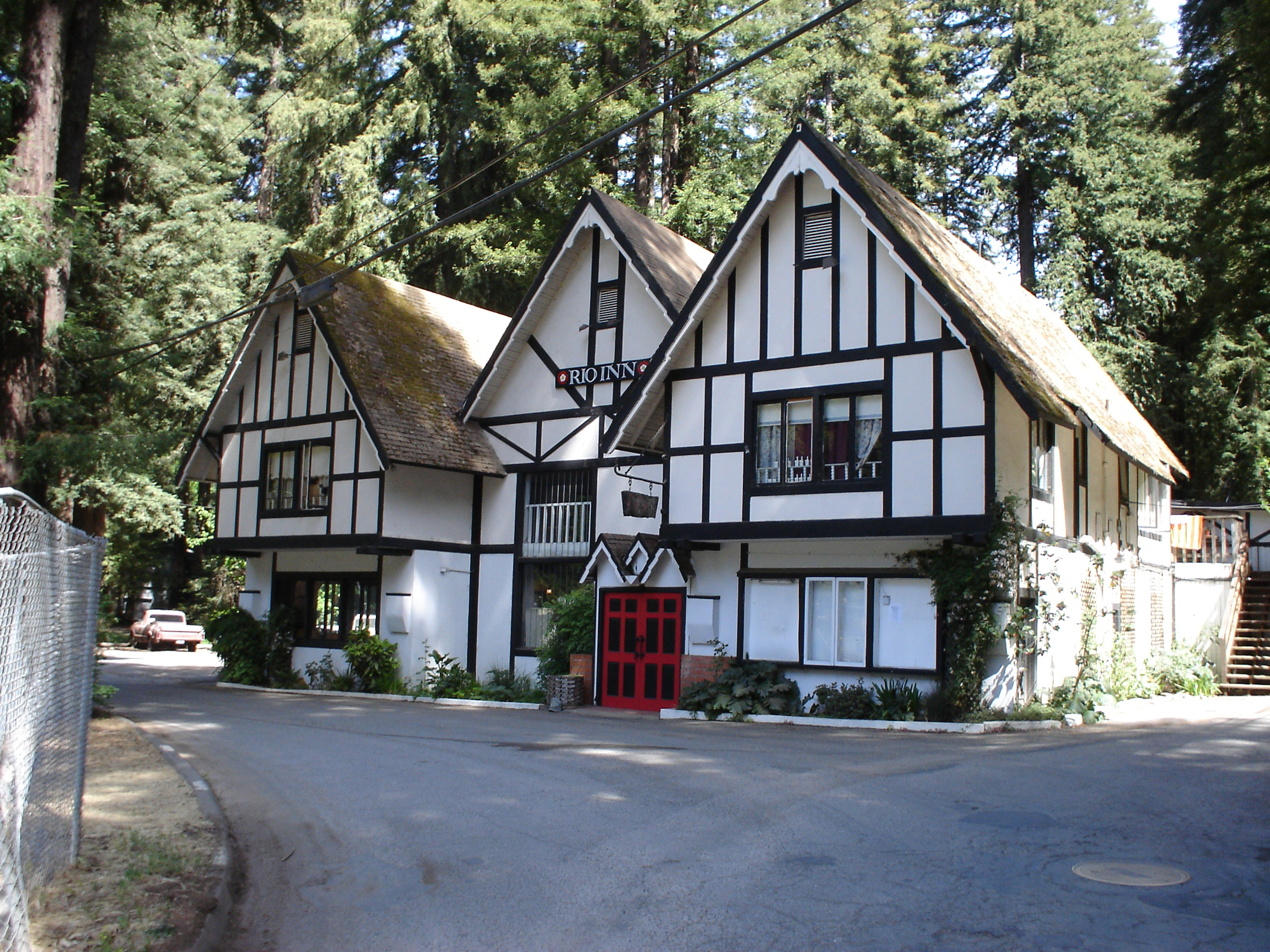
Rio Inn, 2008

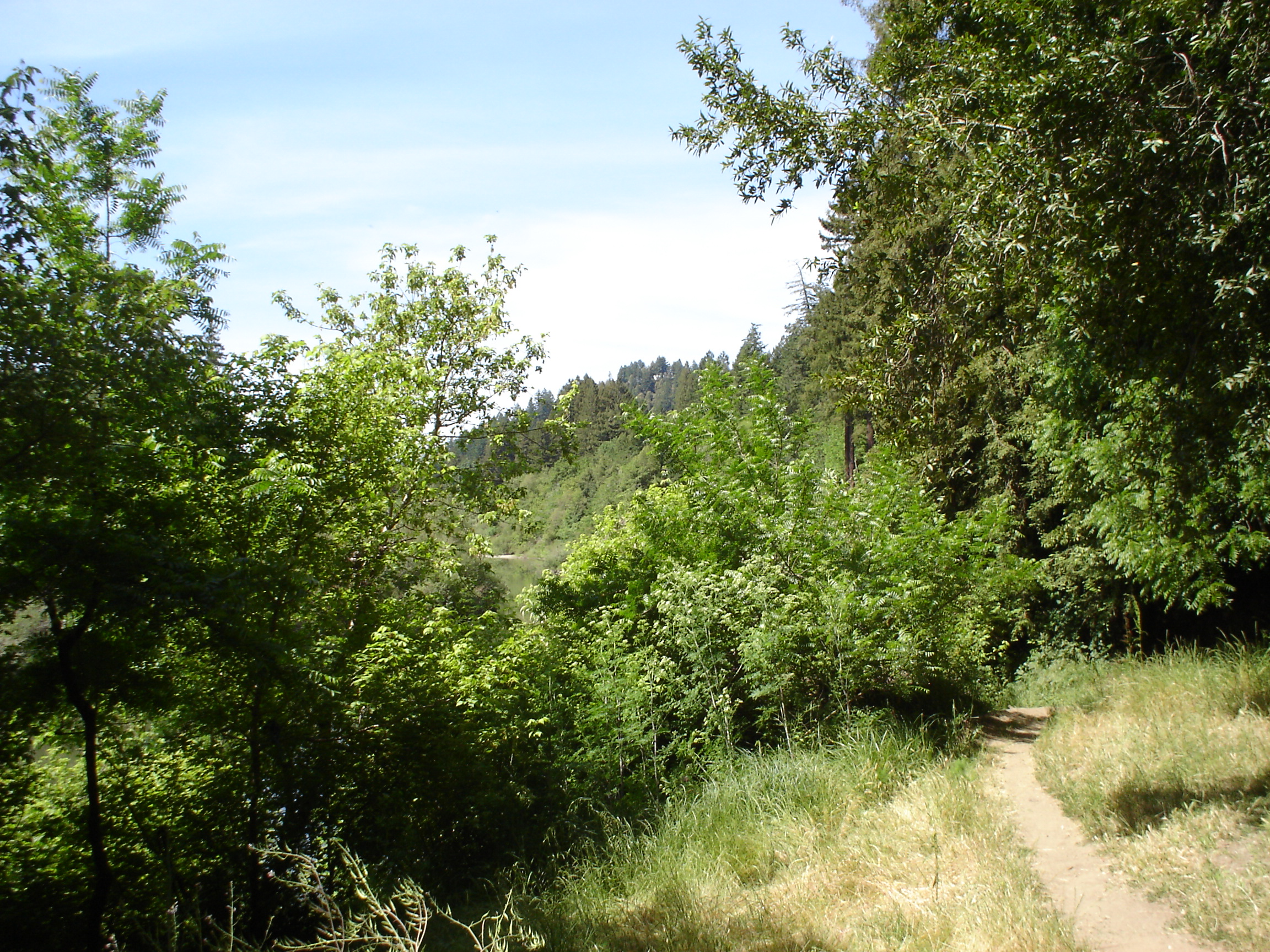
Trail to Russian River at Rio Nido, shown in 2008 when overgrown with weeds

== Climate ==
The National Weather Service reports that Rio Nido, as well as surrounding communities in the Russian River valley, has warm, dry summers with chilly night and morning fog, and cool, wet winters. Snow is extremely rare. It snowed once in 2004 and once in 1989, most recently. January temperatures average between 57.0 °F (13.9 °C) and 35.7 °F (2.1 °C). July temperatures average between 83.6 °F (28.7 °C) and 49.3 °F (9.6 °C). In the summer, fog often drifts up the river from the Pacific Ocean during the late night and early morning hours; most summer afternoons are bright and very warm with light breezes. The highest recorded temperature in nearby Graton was 113 °F (45 °C) in July 1972 and the lowest temperature was 14 °F (−10 °C) in December 1990. Average annual precipitation is 53.23 in (135.2 cm). Heavy winter rains have resulted in occasional flooding of the river.

== Population ==
The 2020 United States Census included Rio Nido in the figures for the Guerneville census-designated place.

According to the 2010 United States census, Rio Nido has 522 residents. Of Rio Nido's population, 84.9% is White, 0.8% Black or African American, 1.5% Native American or Alaskan Native, 1.3% Asian, 0.8% Pacific Islander; 6.5% are of two or more races, and 10.9% are of Hispanic or Latino origin (of any race). Rio Nido has 284 households, and 93 are family households. The average household size is 1.84 people, and 2.72 for every average family household. The median age of Rio Nido is 47.2 years.

== See also ==
- Rio Nido jazz ensemble
