= Russian River (California) =

River in California

Russian River Slavyanka River Rio San Ygnacio, Rio San Ignacio
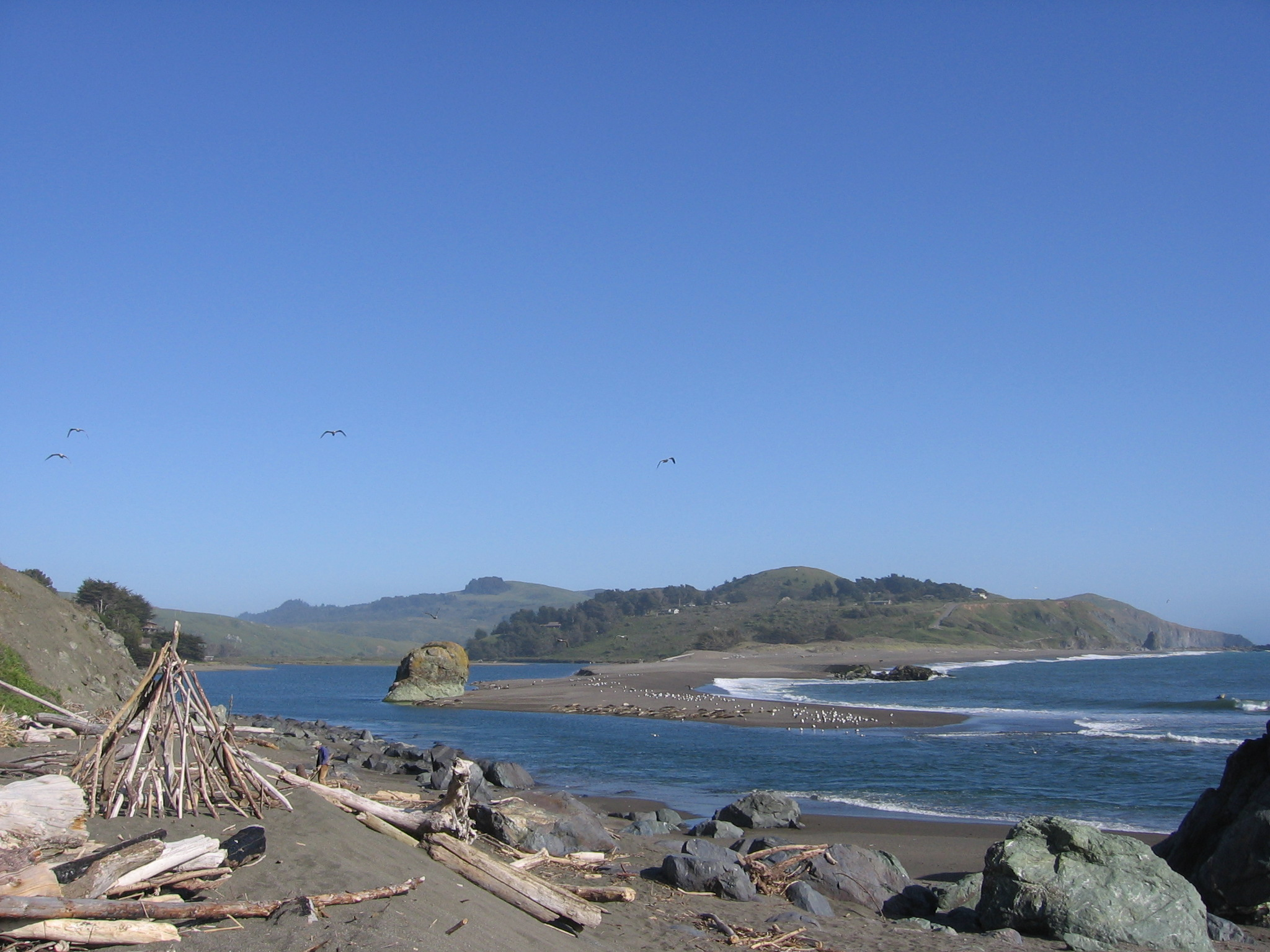
- The estuary of the Russian River, north of Bodega Bay

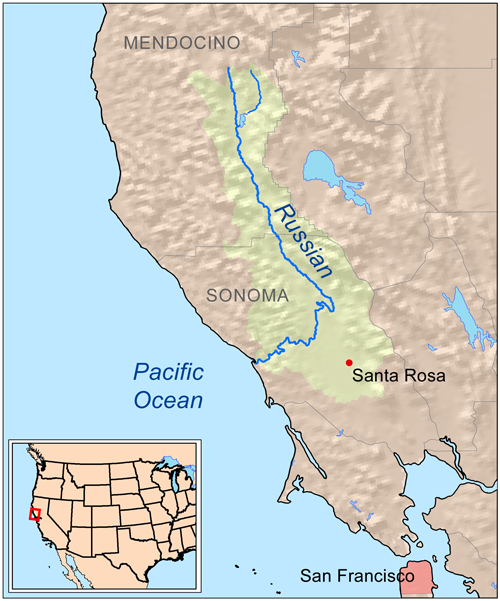
- Native name: Ashokawna, Bidapte (Southern Pomo)

Location
- Country: United States
- State: California
- Region: Sonoma County, Mendocino County
- Cities: Ukiah, Healdsburg

Physical characteristics
- Source: Laughlin Range
  - location: 5 mi (8 km) east of Willits, California
  - coordinates: 39°23′0″N 123°14′18″W
  - elevation: 1,960 ft (600 m)
- Mouth: Pacific Ocean
  - location: Jenner, California
  - coordinates: 38°27′2″N 123°7′46″W
  - elevation: 0 ft (0 m)
- Length: 115 mi (185 km)
- Basin size: 1,485 sq mi (3,850 km^{2})
- Discharge
  - location: Guerneville
  - average: 2,261 cu ft/s (64.0 m^{3}/s)
  - minimum: 0.75 cu ft/s (0.021 m^{3}/s)
  - maximum: 102,000 cu ft/s (2,900 m^{3}/s)

Basin features
- Tributaries
  - left: Mark West Creek, Maacama Creek, Green Valley Creek, Big Sulphur Creek
  - right: Dry Creek, Austin Creek, Fife Creek

The Russian River (Southern Pomo: Ashokawna, Spanish: Río Ruso) (Russian: русская река) is a southward-flowing river that drains 1,485 mi^{2} (3,850 km^{2}) of Sonoma and Mendocino counties in Northern California. With an annual average discharge of approximately 1,600,000 acre feet (2.0 km^{3}), it is the second-largest river (after the Sacramento River) flowing through the nine-county Greater San Francisco Bay Area, with a mainstem 115 mi (185 km) long.

Deriving its name from the establishment of colonial outposts by the Russian-American Company near its course, during the beginning of the 19th century, the river is today a significant body of water for recreation and agriculture and represents, as a result of its damming and the consequent creation of Lake Mendocino, a significant water source for several of the Northern California counties through which it runs.

Ecologically, the river is home to the Russian River tule perch, a distinctively endemic species of freshwater surfperch, as well as significant populations of steelhead trout, Coho and Chinook salmon. During its initial exploration, large numbers of otters and beavers were also identified, and subsequently hunted. Presently, toxic cyanobacteria of the genus Microcoleus have also represented a significant element of the Russian River ecosystem, including a species from that genus found only in the river as of yet.

== Names ==
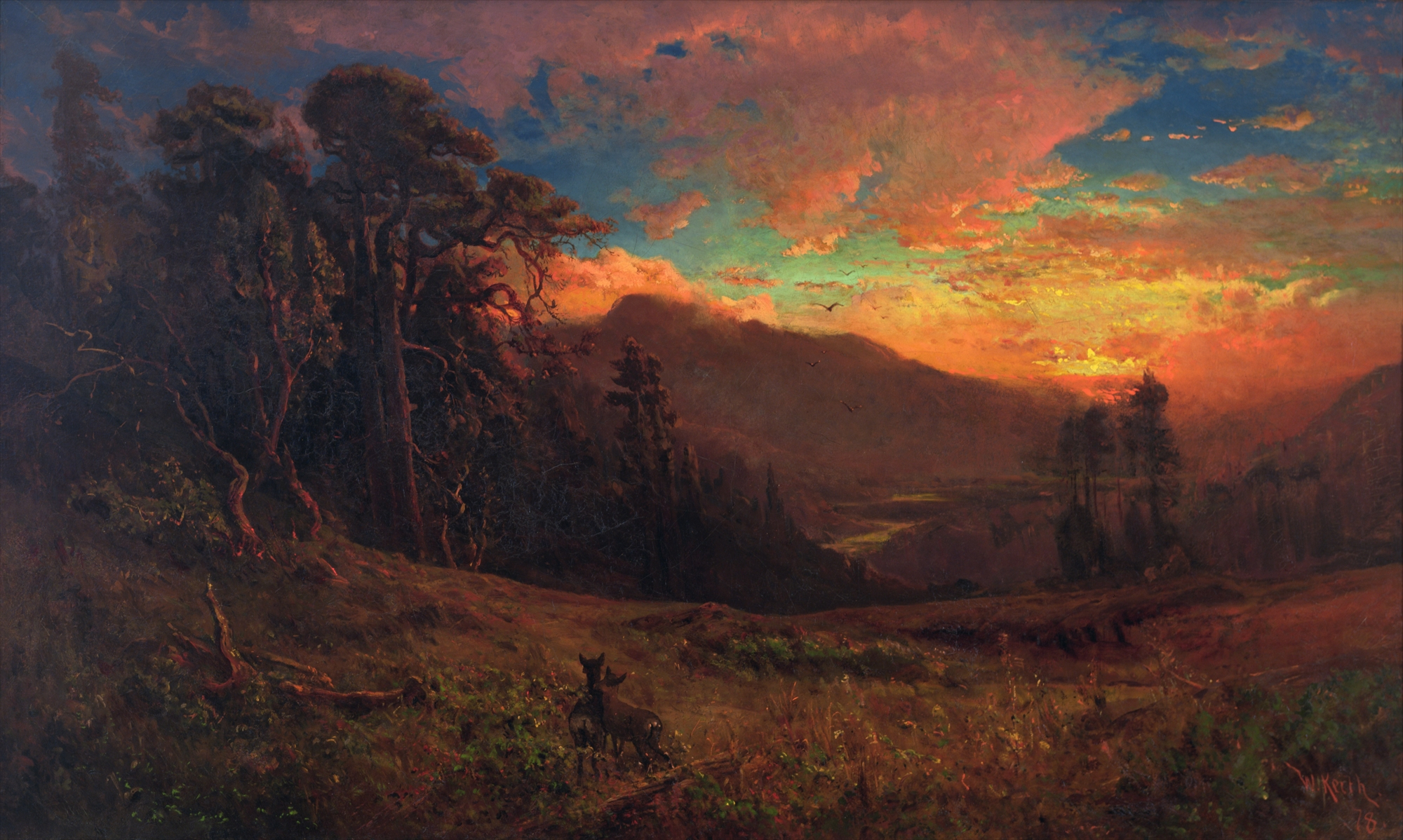
An Autumnal Sunset on the Russian River Evening Glow by William Keith, 1878

The Southern Pomo know the river as Ashokawna (ʔaš:oʔkʰawna), "east water place" or "water to the east", and as Bidapte, "big river." Juan Rodríguez Cabrillo and his expedition may have travelled as far north as the Russian River in November 1542 before storms forced them to turn back south towards Monterey. The earliest Slavic name for the river, Slavyanka, appears on a Russian-American Company chart dated 1817. In 1827 the Spanish called it the San Ygnacio, and in 1843 the Spanish land grant referred to it as Rio Grande.

The river takes its current name from Russian Ivan Kuskov of the Russian-American Company, who explored the river in the early 19th-century and established the Fort Ross colony 10 mi (16 km) northwest of its mouth. The Russians called it the Slavyanka River, meaning "Slav River". (Slavyanka in Russian means "Slavic woman".) They established three ranches near Fort Ross, one of which, the Kostromitinov Ranch, stretched along the Russian River near the mouth of Willow Creek. The redwoods that lined its banks drew loggers to the river in the late 19th century.

According to the USGS, variant names of the Russian River include Misallaako, Rio Ruso, Shabaikai, and Slavyanka.

== Course ==
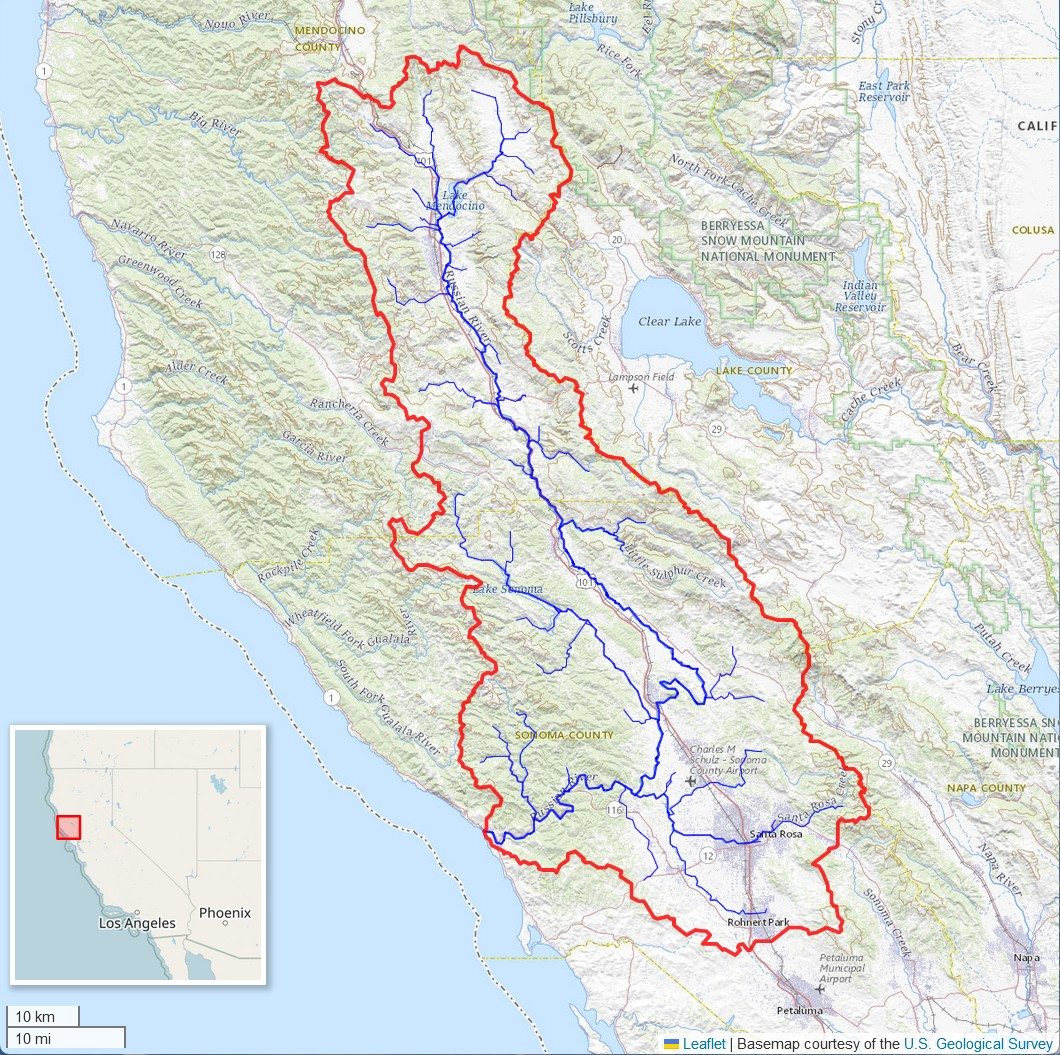
Russian River watershed (Interactive map)

The Russian River springs from the Laughlin Range about 5 mi (8 km) east of Willits in Mendocino County. It flows generally southward to Redwood Valley, then past Calpella, where it is bordered by U.S. Route 101, to join the East Fork Russian River just below Lake Mendocino.

From there the Russian River flows south, past Ukiah through the Ukiah Valley and Hopland through the Sanel Valley, and crosses into Sonoma County just north of Cloverdale. Closely paralleled by U.S. Route 101, it descends into the Alexander Valley, where it is joined by Big Sulphur Creek. It flows south past Cloverdale, Asti, and Geyserville.

From there, the Russian River flows west, east of Healdsburg, Maacama Creek joins the Russian River. After it makes a series of sweeping bends, the Healdsburg Memorial Bridge carries Old Redwood Highway over the river just upstream of U.S. Route 101's Healdsburg crossing. It receives water from Lake Sonoma via Dry Creek. The river turns westward, where it is spanned by the Wohler Bridge, and it is joined by Mark West Creek north of Forestville, followed by Green Valley Creek to the south. The river passes Rio Nido and Guerneville. In that area, State Route 116 parallels the river, bordering it past Guernewood Park and Monte Rio.

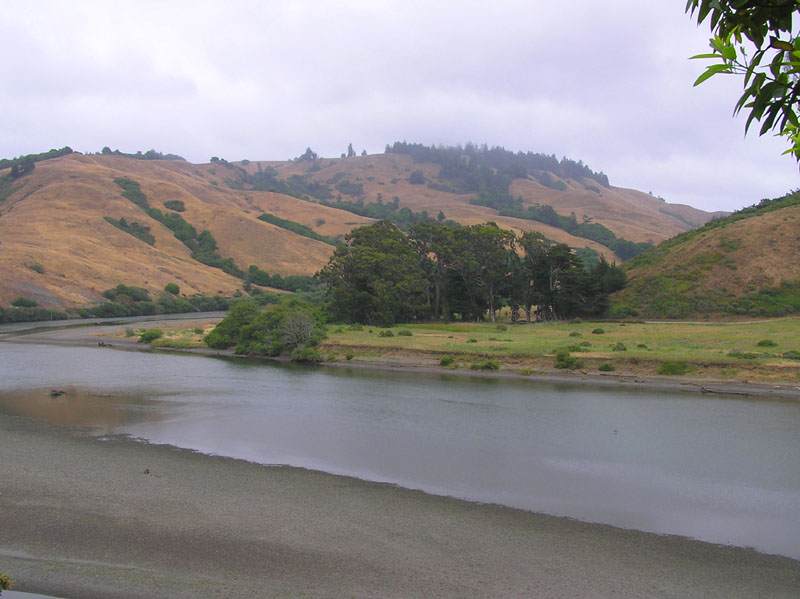
The Russian River downstream of Duncans Mills

Austin Creek enters from the north before the River passes through Duncans Mills. State Route 1 crosses over the river before it flows into the Pacific Ocean between Jenner and Goat Rock Beach. The Russian River estuary is recognized for protection by the California Bays and Estuaries Policy. The mouth is about 60 mi (100 km) north of the San Francisco Bay's Golden Gate bridge.

The lower Russian River is a popular spring, summer, and fall destination for navigation and recreation. It is very safe at that time for swimming and boating, with a gentle current. The river is dangerous in the winter, with swift current and muddy water.

== Geology ==
The geographer R. S. Holway described the Russian River in his 1917 paper "The Russian River: A Characteristic Stream of the California Coast Ranges". Originally, the Russian River was one of several rivers draining westward from the Mayacamas Mountains through the Mendocino Plateau to the sea, a region lifted up by tectonic forces. The Navarro River drained from the Cobb Mountain area, while the Russian River drained from the Mt. St. Helena area. Being at a lower elevation, the Russian River began cutting north into the drainage area of the Navarro River. Eroding up a fault line in Alexander Valley, the Russian River intersected the Navarro River just north of Cloverdale. This resulted in the stream capture of Big Sulphur Creek (formerly the upper Navarro River) and the north fork of the Navarro River, going north to Hopland and to Ukiah. The high valleys were eroded into rocky canyons for ten miles north of Cloverdale and for five miles east of Cloverdale.

After establishing a connection to Clear Lake, the Russian River was beheaded from Clear Lake by a slide at Cow Mountain, east of Ukiah. Now Clear Lake flows into the Sacramento River. The river incised a canyon into Fitch Mountain at an early time, before land levels were eroded to their present levels. The river was prevented from flowing south into San Pablo Bay by a 113-foot high ridge at Cotati. Guerneville is built on an abandoned meander of the river. Near Guerneville, another meander cut short Smith Creek.

A 1977 survey published in the journal Micropaleontology identified 29 species of foraminifera in the estuary of the river, collected from three ecologically different regions. Characterizing the estuary with respect to degrees of mixture or separation demonstrated between saltwater and freshwater, the survey found the highest diversity of species was recorded from offshore stations, as well as those occurring towards the mouth of the river.

The Mendocino Plateau is a part of the Franciscan Complex.

== River modifications ==
A portion of the Eel River is diverted to headwaters of the Russian River in Potter Valley, via a scheme known as the Potter Valley Project. The Sonoma County Water Agency draws drinking water from the Russian River for sale to several hundred thousand residents of Sonoma, Mendocino, and northern Marin counties. Santa Rosa's Laguna Wastewater Treatment Plant treats sewage from several communities to tertiary standards and returns some of it to the river by way of the Laguna de Santa Rosa.

Water transferred from the Eel River and released from Lake Mendocino flows through the Russian River channel to withdrawal points in Sonoma County. Although this method of transport supports aquatic and riparian zone habitats, it is vulnerable to chemical contamination from transportation accidents. These are an issue at points where the river is in close proximity to highway 101 and Northwestern Pacific Railroad transportation corridors, in locations like the canyon between Cloverdale and Hopland. This vulnerability was demonstrated in March 1982, when a tank car of formaldehyde was vandalized in Ukiah. Emergency response personnel were able to clean up approximately half of the 21,000 US gallons (79,000 L) spilled, and a fortuitous combination of Lake Mendocino reservoir inventory and late winter storms helped flush the remainder through the river and into the ocean before local water storage inventories were exhausted.

The Russian River reached flood stage of 32 feet (9.8 m) at Guerneville about five times per decade through the last half of the 20th century. Historic flood peaks were 49.5 feet (15.1 m) in February 1986, 48 feet (15 m) in January 1995, 47.6 feet (14.5 m) in December 1955, 47.3 feet (14.4 m) in December 1964, and 46.9 feet (14.3 m) in February 1940. Through effective use of Lake Mendocino and Lake Sonoma flood capacity, the river has exceeded flood stage at Guerneville less frequently in the 21st century. In late February 2019, however, it flooded to levels comparable to 1986.

== Ecology ==
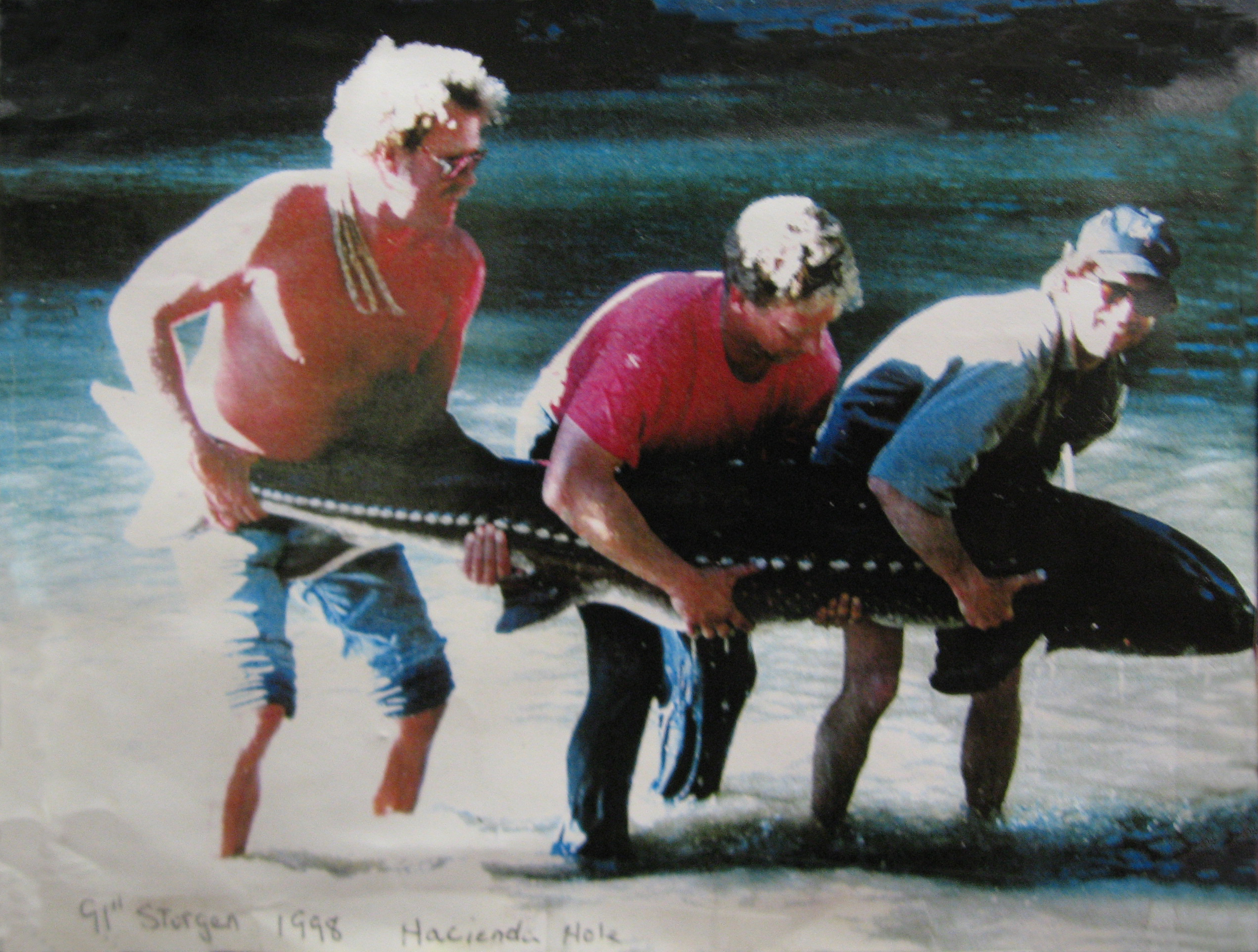
White sturgeon (Acipenser transmontanus), almost 8 feet (2.4 m) long, caught in 1998 in the Russian River's "Hacienda Hole" in Guerneville, California

=== Fish populations ===
The river provides wildlife habitat including warm and cold freshwater habitat for fish migration and spawning. It is of historical note as one of two Northern California coastal rivers mentioned in the early nineteenth century by Russian explorer K. T. Khlebnikov as hosting sturgeon along with the Pajaro River. These were presumably white sturgeon (Acipenser transmontanus), the largest freshwater fish in the United States. Khlebnikov stated in his "1820 Travel Notes": "Mr. Kuskov had sent two baidarkas to the Slavyanka River to catch sturgeon, and they returned today with ten fish... the largest one exceeding two arshins (4.67 feet) long". Moyle's Inland Fishes of California states that there were historic runs of white, but not green, sturgeon in the Russian River.

The Russian River is the largest river in the Central California Coast steelhead trout (Oncorhynchus mykiss) distinct population segment. Natural waterfalls and the two major dams, Warm Springs (built in 1982) and Coyote (built in 1959), have isolated anadromous steelhead from its non-oceangoing rainbow trout form above the impassable barriers. Recent genetic studies on steelhead collected at 20 different sites both above and below passage barriers in the watershed found that despite the fact that 30 million hatchery trout were stocked in the river from 1911 to 1925, the steelhead remain of native and not hatchery stock.

Until recently, most reviews indicated that Chinook salmon (Oncorhynchus tshawytscha) were always scarce on the Russian River. However, in 2007, the Sonoma County Water Agency completed a comprehensive re-evaluation of historical records, coupled with a five-year monitoring program using underwater cameras at two fish ladders just north of Forestville. They found that Chinook salmon always were, and still are, "a relatively abundant, widely distributed, and naturally self-sustaining population". The authors found historic information dating to 1881 suggesting the presence of an ancestral population, and their genetic analysis found the Chinook both above and below barriers to fish passage to be of native, and not hatchery stock.

In 2001 the Coho salmon (Oncorhynchus kisutch) had dwindled to less than four returning spawners per year. These low numbers were the catalyst for the Russian River Coho Salmon Captive Broodstock Program, a recovery effort in which offspring from hatchery-reared adults are released into the river system. In 2011, biologists estimate that more than 190 adult coho may have returned to the Russian River watershed, beginning with early storms in October and peaking in December. High priority tributaries for restoration of stream flows and habitat for Coho include Dutch Bill, Grape, Green Valley, Mark West and Mill Creeks.

A 2010 survey by the Sonoma County Water Agency also examined populations of the Russian River tule perch, the only species of fish endemic to the watershed of the river. It found populations of the fish, currently considered a California Department of Fish and Game (CDFG) Species of Special Concern, in 94% of the river mainstem, through a combination of historical statistics and empirical surveying at trap sites. Tule perch accounted for 2.9% to 9.5% of all fish observed in the upper portion of the river, with their presence largely confined to areas of riparian vegetation; however, specimens were also observed in the confluence of the river with Willow Creek, a brackish estuary area, indicating that the species may take advantage of freshwater microhabitats. Despite historic records of the fish in the lower East Fork tributary and in the footprint of Lake Mendocino, the contemporary assessments of the team found no tule perch at either location, noting absences downstream of its Coyote Valley Dam and the Warm Springs Dam.

The Russian River State Marine Reserve and Russian River State Marine Conservation Area protect the Russian River Estuary. Like underwater parks, these marine protected areas help conserve ocean and freshwater wildlife and marine ecosystems.

=== Beaver presence ===
Similarly to speculation about fish populations, early twentieth-century naturalists were skeptical that California Golden beaver (Castor canadensis subauratus) were extant in the coastal streams of the Bay Area. However, the Russian-American Company's Ivan Kuskov sailed into Bodega Bay in 1809 on the Kodiak and, after exploring 50 miles of the Russian River, returned to Novo Arkhangelsk, Alaska (Sitka), with beaver skins and over 2,000 sea otter (Enhydra lutris) pelts. The Russians' stated reason for establishing a settlement in Alta California was, "The rich, fertile soil [and] the abundance of seal, otter and beaver were the principal factors which favored this colonization." An 1816 report by the Russian-American Company's Board of Directors said that it was establishing a settlement to introduce agriculture.

Before establishing a southern colony at Fort Ross, the Russian-American Company contracted with American ships beginning in 1806, providing them with Aleuts and their baidarkas (kayaks) to hunt otter on the coast of Spanish California. The Hudson's Bay Company's Alexander R. McLeod reported in 1829, "The Country to the northward of Bodega is said to be rich in Beaver and no encouragement given to the Indians to hunt." The fur trapper Ewing Young led an expedition up Putah Creek to Clear Lake and onward to the Mendocino County Coast in March 1833. James Weeks, a member of Young's 1833 fur brigade, wrote: "They broke up all the beaver lodges on the lake, I believe the finest and largest beaver we caught there, we arrived at the Russian River and pitched camp sent out, trappers found signs set traps caught beavers..." This historical observer record is consistent with the Southern Pomo, who inhabited the lower half of the Russian River, having a word for beaver, ṱ'ek:e, and beavers in their "Coyote Stories". In 1881 the Sacramento Daily Union newspaper reported "Beavers are being trapped near Healdsburg", placing them again on the Russian River.

=== Toxic cyanobacteria ===
After the death of a household dog which had been exposed to the river's waters in 2015, a toxicology investigation identified the cause to be anatoxin-a, a highly potent neurotoxin produced by certain freshwater cyanobacteria. The compound induces a state of paralysis by binding to acetylcholine receptors in muscle nerves, and is known due to its rapid manifestation of symptoms as the "Very Fast Death Factor". The species which produce the compound tend to occur in nutrient-poor freshwater ecosystems, including rivers, and grow as filamentous mats on surfaces along the benthic zone of a river. Previous reports have occurred in New Zealand, Northern California and, more recently, Utah.

A study by Conklin et al., examining samples collected from the river in October 2015, attempted to isolate species of anatoxin-producing cyanobacteria. Analysis of the three collected benthic mats resulted in the discovery of the new species Microcoleus anatoxicus, in the genus Microcoleus, which contains several related and similarly toxic species found in Northern California and New Zealand bodies of freshwater.

A further study published in 2025 examined the relationship between toxigenicity and growth rates in anatoxin-producing and nonproducing Microcoleus samples collected from Northern California rivers. The results identified faster growth rates in toxin-producing samples of Microcoleus anatoxicus, the newly identified species, particularly in nutrient-rich environments. This conclusion reverses previous research indicating a contrary effect and implies a possible impact on growth rates from nutrition levels, particularly inorganic nitrogen.

== Russian River Valley ==
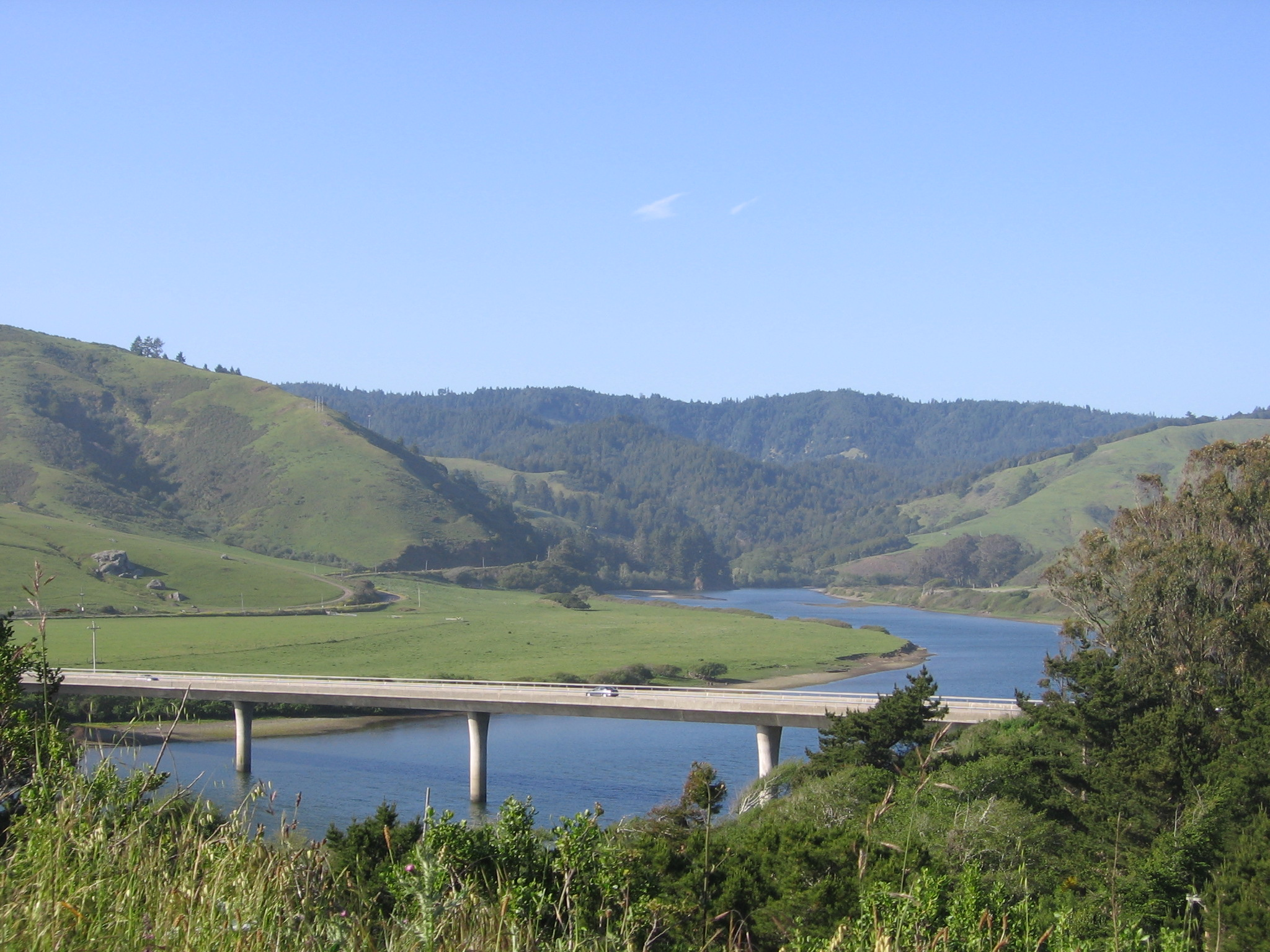
View of the Russian River and the Russian River Valley showing the California State Route 1 bridge near Jenner

The river provides groundwater recharge and a water supply for agriculture. The river's floodplain includes many vineyards, and in 1983, a portion named Russian River Valley was officially established as an American Viticultural Area (AVA) and expanded in 2003, 2005 and 2001. Chardonnay and Pinot Noir and other wine varietals are produced and many small and several large commercial wineries reside here.

== See also ==
- Bohemian Grove
- Floods in California
- List of rivers in California
- List of watercourses in the San Francisco Bay Area
- Russian River State Marine Reserve & Russian River State Marine Conservation Area
- Sonoma County wine
- Frog Woman Rock
- California Wine Country
- California Fur Rush
- Monte Rio
