= Maacama Creek =

Mayacama Creek
- Location of the mouth of Mayacama Creek in California
- Etymology: Wappo language

Location
- Country: United States
- State: California
- Region: Sonoma County

Physical characteristics
- Source: McDonnell Creek
  - location: Pine Mountain, 12 mi (20 km) northeast of Healdsburg, California
  - coordinates: 38°44′15″N 122°43′40″W
  - elevation: 3,360 ft (1,020 m)
- 2nd source: Briggs Creek
  - location: north shoulder of Mount Saint Helena
  - coordinates: 38°42′23″N 122°39′45″W
  - elevation: 2,630 ft (800 m)
- Source confluence: confluence
  - location: 8 mi (10 km) northeast of Healdsburg, California
  - coordinates: 38°40′28″N 122°44′36″W
  - elevation: 300 ft (91 m)
- Mouth: Russian River
  - location: 4 mi (6 km) east of Healdsburg, California
  - coordinates: 38°36′50″N 122°47′1″W
  - elevation: 141 ft (43 m)
- Length: 8 mi (13 km)from confluence to mouth

Basin features
- Tributaries
  - left: Redwood Creek, Franz Creek

Mayacama Creek is a 7.3-mile-long (11.7 km) stream in northern Sonoma County, California, U.S.A., which empties into the Russian River near the city of Healdsburg.

== Course ==
Maacama Creek begins at the confluence of McDonnell Creek and Briggs Creek near Peter Hill in the Mayacamas Mountains. From there, it flows south, paralleling Briggs Ranch Road almost to State Route 128, where it turns westward. It parallels the highway for about 0.7 miles (1.1 km) before passing under to meet Redwood Creek. Upon entering the Alexander Valley, it turns southward again and parallels Chalk Hill Road until it meets Franz Creek. It then flows west another 0.71 miles (1.1 km) to enter the Russian River about 4 miles (6 km) east of Healdsburg.

== Habitat and pollution ==
As of 2000, Maacama Creek and all its major tributaries all supported steelhead trout. Franz Creek also harbored California freshwater shrimp, and Redwood Creek and Maacama Creek hosted coho salmon.

== Bridges ==
Two bridges span Maacama Creek: The Chalk Hill Road bridge is a 170-foot (52 m) concrete arch built in 1915, and State Route 128 crosses the creek at milepost 17.25 on a 147-foot (45 m) concrete continuous tee beam built in 1931.

== See also ==
- List of watercourses in the San Francisco Bay Area
