= KGGV-LP =

- Guerneville, California; United States
- Frequency: 95.1 MHz
- Branding: The Bridge

Programming
- Format: Community Radio

Ownership
- Owner: (Multi Media Educational Foundation)

History
- First air date: 2005

Technical information
- Licensing authority: FCC
- Facility ID: 124862
- Class: L1
- ERP: 100 watts
- HAAT: -95.0 meters
- Transmitter coordinates: 38°30′32″N 122°59′44″W

Links
- Public license information: LMS
- Webcast: Listen Live
- Website: kggv.fm

KGGV-LP (95.1 FM) was a non-commercial all volunteer community radio station broadcasting music, news, and discussion forums. Licensed to Guerneville, California, United States, the station is owned by Multi Media Educational Foundation.
