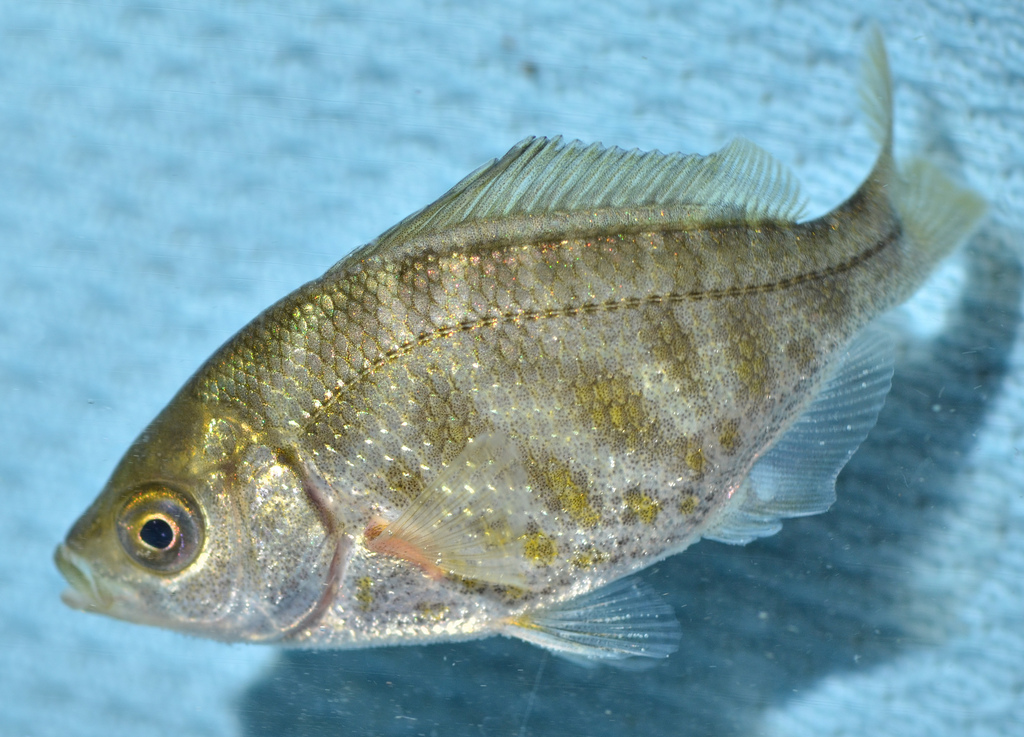

Scientific classification
- Kingdom: Animalia
- Phylum: Chordata
- Class: Actinopterygii
- Order: Blenniiformes
- Family: Embiotocidae
- Genus: Hysterocarpus
- Species: H. traskii
- Subspecies: H. t. pomo

Trinomial name
- Hysterocarpus traskii pomo Hopkirk, 1974

= Hysterocarpus traskii pomo =

Subspecies of fish

Hysterocarpus traskii pomo is one of three subspecies of tule perch and is endemic to the Russian River in California, USA. The subspecies name refers to the Pomo tribe of Native Americans who lived in the region.
