= Graton, California =

Graton
- census-designated place
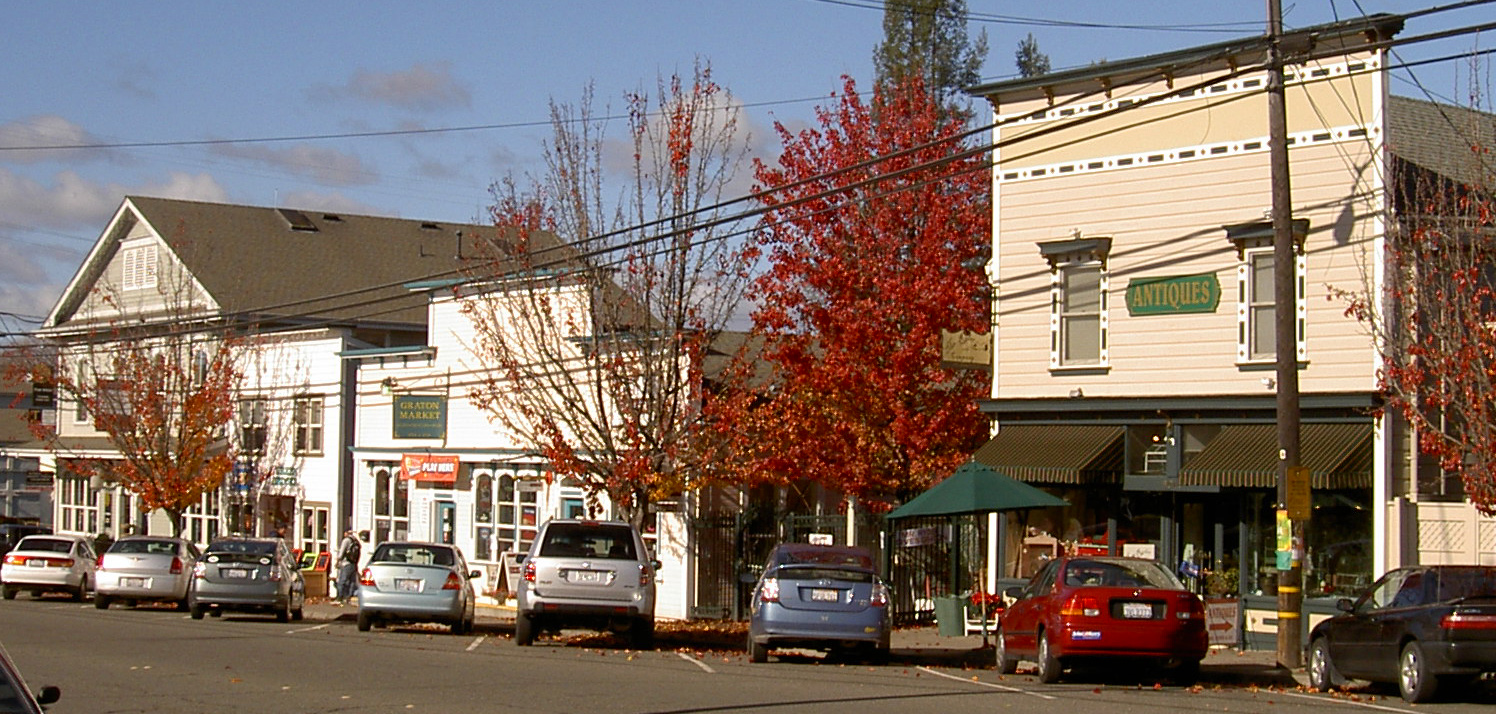
- Graton storefronts on north side of Graton Road between Ross Road and South Edison Street

- Location in Sonoma County and the state of California
- Coordinates: 38°26′15″N 122°51′59″W
- Country: United States
- State: California
- County: Sonoma

Area
  - Total: 1.579 sq mi (4.090 km^{2})
  - Land: 1.579 sq mi (4.090 km^{2})
  - Water: 0 sq mi (0 km^{2}) 0%
- Elevation: 108 ft (33 m)

Population (2020)
  - Total: 1,683
  - Density: 1,066/sq mi (411.5/km^{2})
- Time zone: UTC-8 (PST)
  - Summer (DST): UTC-7 (PDT)
- ZIP code: 95444
- Area code: 707
- FIPS code: 06-30812
- GNIS feature ID: 1658656

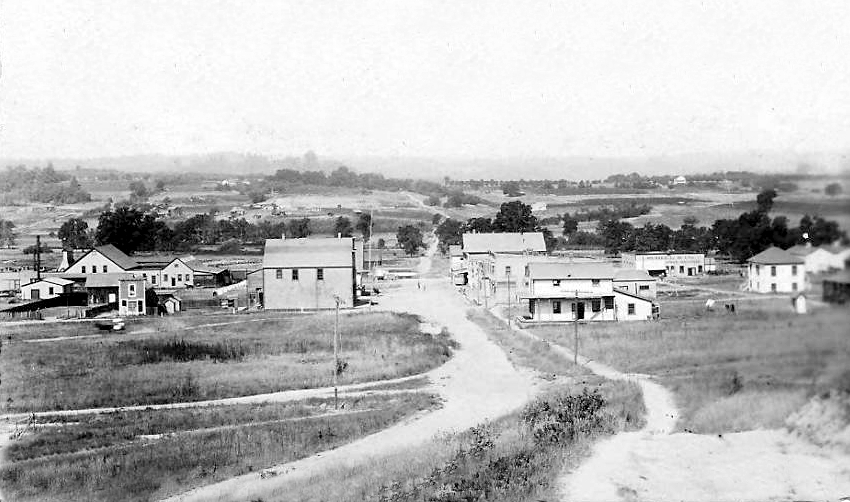
Graton, 1909

Graton is an unincorporated town and census-designated place (CDP) in west Sonoma County, California, United States. The population was 1,683 at the 2020 census. Graton's ZIP code is 95444. The town also has a culinary reputation attributed to two restaurants in the area.

The town of Graton is roughly 20 miles (32 km) from the California coastline. Graton's agriculture was historically concentrated on apple farming, but like most of rural Sonoma County it now focuses on wine production.

== Geography ==
Graton has a total area of 1.58 sq mi (4.1 km^{2}), all land.

Graton is located at the southeastern end of Green Valley, on the east bank of the seasonally flooding Atascadero Creek. The elevation ranges from approximately 85 feet (26 m) above Mean Sea Level (MSL) at Atascadero Creek to 213 feet (65 m) MSL at Oak Grove School.

Graton is noted as lying at the approximate furthest southern and eastern extent of Russian colonization of the Americas. Research on Fort Ross has indicated that several farms were developed inland from the coastal fur trading fort in northwestern Sonoma County. These farms or ranches were used for producing additional food and for agricultural projects conducted by Fort Ross's agronomist Yegor Chernykh. In 1836, a farm was established along Purrington Creek, between what are now the towns of Occidental and Graton. There Chernykh erected barracks and five other structures, and grew vegetables, fruit, wheat, and other grains. Chernykh also developed a large vineyard, introducing what has since become a major crop in the area.

=== Climate ===
This region experiences warm (but not hot) and dry summers, with no average monthly temperatures above 71.6 °F (22.0 °C). According to the Köppen Climate Classification system, Graton has a warm-summer Mediterranean climate, abbreviated Csb on climate maps.

Climate data for Graton (1991–2020 normals, extremes 1926–present)
Month	Jan	Feb	Mar	Apr	May	Jun	Jul	Aug	Sep	Oct	Nov	Dec	Year
Record high °F (°C)	84 (29)	88 (31)	90 (32)	98 (37)	103 (39)	108 (42)	113 (45)	108 (42)	114 (46)	106 (41)	92 (33)	81 (27)	114 (46)
Mean maximum °F (°C)	69.9 (21.1)	75.8 (24.3)	80.6 (27.0)	86.9 (30.5)	91.0 (32.8)	98.4 (36.9)	98.4 (36.9)	100.4 (38.0)	100.2 (37.9)	95.1 (35.1)	82.5 (28.1)	70.0 (21.1)	103.5 (39.7)
Mean daily maximum °F (°C)	58.0 (14.4)	62.3 (16.8)	65.9 (18.8)	70.2 (21.2)	75.2 (24.0)	81.3 (27.4)	82.6 (28.1)	83.8 (28.8)	83.7 (28.7)	78.2 (25.7)	66.8 (19.3)	57.7 (14.3)	72.1 (22.3)
Daily mean °F (°C)	47.7 (8.7)	50.7 (10.4)	53.3 (11.8)	56.2 (13.4)	60.4 (15.8)	64.8 (18.2)	66.5 (19.2)	67.1 (19.5)	65.9 (18.8)	61.2 (16.2)	53.3 (11.8)	47.2 (8.4)	57.9 (14.4)
Mean daily minimum °F (°C)	37.3 (2.9)	39.0 (3.9)	40.7 (4.8)	42.2 (5.7)	45.5 (7.5)	48.3 (9.1)	50.5 (10.3)	50.3 (10.2)	48.0 (8.9)	44.2 (6.8)	39.7 (4.3)	36.8 (2.7)	43.5 (6.4)
Mean minimum °F (°C)	26.0 (−3.3)	27.9 (−2.3)	30.4 (−0.9)	32.3 (0.2)	36.5 (2.5)	40.1 (4.5)	42.9 (6.1)	42.5 (5.8)	39.1 (3.9)	33.9 (1.1)	28.0 (−2.2)	25.5 (−3.6)	23.4 (−4.8)
Record low °F (°C)	18 (−8)	17 (−8)	25 (−4)	25 (−4)	29 (−2)	33 (1)	38 (3)	36 (2)	28 (−2)	22 (−6)	22 (−6)	14 (−10)	14 (−10)
Average precipitation inches (mm)	7.88 (200)	7.48 (190)	5.18 (132)	2.58 (66)	1.41 (36)	0.41 (10)	0.01 (0.25)	0.06 (1.5)	0.18 (4.6)	1.98 (50)	4.43 (113)	8.34 (212)	39.94 (1,014)
Average precipitation days	13.2	11.8	11.1	7.3	4.1	1.5	0.4	0.8	1.5	4.2	8.8	13.2	77.9
Source: NOAA

== Demographics ==
Historical population
Census	Pop.	Note	%±
1980	1,286		—
1990	1,409		9.6%
2000	1,815		28.8%
2010	1,707		−6.0%
2020	1,683		−1.4%
U.S. Decennial Census; 1860–1870 1880-1890; 1900 1910 1920; 1930 1940 1950; 1960 1970 1980; 1990 2000 2010; 2020

Graton first appeared as a census designated place in the 1980 U.S. census.

=== Racial and ethnic composition ===
Graton CDP, California – Racial and ethnic composition Note: the US Census treats Hispanic/Latino as an ethnic category. This table excludes Latinos from the racial categories and assigns them to a separate category. Hispanics/Latinos may be of any race.
Race / Ethnicity (NH = Non-Hispanic)	Pop 2000	Pop 2010	Pop 2020	% 2000	% 2010	% 2020
White alone (NH)	1,371	1,272	1,203	75.54%	74.52%	71.48%
Black or African American alone (NH)	9	10	9	0.50%	0.59%	0.53%
Native American or Alaska Native alone (NH)	21	20	6	1.16%	1.17%	0.36%
Asian alone (NH)	20	24	25	1.10%	1.41%	1.49%
Native Hawaiian or Pacific Islander alone (NH)	0	3	2	0.00%	0.18%	0.12%
Other race alone (NH)	6	1	21	0.33%	0.06%	1.25%
Mixed race or Multiracial (NH)	38	55	119	2.09%	3.22%	7.07%
Hispanic or Latino (any race)	350	322	298	19.28%	18.86%	17.71%
Total	1,815	1,707	1,683	100.00%	100.00%	100.00%

=== 2020 census ===
As of the 2020 census, Graton had a population of 1,683. The population density was 1,065.9 inhabitants per square mile (411.5/km^{2}). The median age was 49.9 years; 16.6% of residents were under age 18 and 28.8% were age 65 or older. For every 100 females, there were 81.6 males, and for every 100 females age 18 and over, there were 79.9 males age 18 and over.

Racial composition as of the 2020 census
Race	Number	Percent
White	1,279	76.0%
Black or African American	10	0.6%
American Indian and Alaska Native	11	0.7%
Asian	25	1.5%
Native Hawaiian and Other Pacific Islander	4	0.2%
Some other race	135	8.0%
Two or more races	219	13.0%

The census reported that 99.2% of the population lived in households, 14 people (0.8%) lived in non-institutionalized group quarters, and no one was institutionalized. In addition, 93.7% of residents lived in urban areas, while 6.3% lived in rural areas.

There were 678 households, of which 153 (22.6%) had children under the age of 18 living in them. Of all households, 318 (46.9%) were married-couple households, 44 (6.5%) were cohabiting couple households, 215 (31.7%) had a female householder with no spouse or partner present, and 101 (14.9%) had a male householder with no spouse or partner present. Households made up of one person totaled 212 (31.3%), and 123 (18.1%) were one person aged 65 or older. The average household size was 2.46. There were 422 families (62.2% of all households).

There were 725 housing units at an average density of 459.2 units per square mile (177.3 units/km^{2}), of which 678 (93.5%) were occupied and 47 (6.5%) were vacant. The homeowner vacancy rate was 1.9%, and the rental vacancy rate was 6.2%. Of occupied units, 514 (75.8%) were owner-occupied and 164 (24.2%) were occupied by renters.

=== 2010 census ===
At the 2010 census Graton had a population of 1,707. The population density was 1,080.9 inhabitants per square mile (417.3/km^{2}). The racial makeup of Graton was 1,402 (82.1%) White, 10 (0.6%) African American, 29 (1.7%) Native American, 25 (1.5%) Asian, 3 (0.2%) Pacific Islander, 144 (8.4%) from other races, and 94 (5.5%) from two or more races. Hispanic or Latino of any race were 322 people (18.9%).

The census reported that 99.2% of the population lived in households and 0.8% lived in non-institutionalized group quarters.

There were 680 households, 193 (28.4%) had children under the age of 18 living in them, 304 (44.7%) were opposite-sex married couples living together, 90 (13.2%) had a female householder with no husband present, 19 (2.8%) had a male householder with no wife present. There were 35 (5.1%) unmarried opposite-sex partnerships, and 18 (2.6%) same-sex married couples or partnerships. 188 households (27.6%) were one person and 73 (10.7%) had someone living alone who was 65 or older. The average household size was 2.49. There were 413 families (60.7% of households); the average family size was 3.03.

The age distribution was 343 people (20.1%) under the age of 18, 131 people (7.7%) aged 18 to 24, 352 people (20.6%) aged 25 to 44, 643 people (37.7%) aged 45 to 64, and 238 people (13.9%) who were 65 or older. The median age was 45.9 years. For every 100 females, there were 90.7 males. For every 100 females age 18 and over, there were 86.8 males. The median resident age is 48.2 years, compared to the California average of 36.2 years.

There were 723 housing units at an average density of 457.8 per square mile (176.8/km^{2}), of which 72.2% were owner-occupied and 27.8% were occupied by renters. The homeowner vacancy rate was 0.6%; the rental vacancy rate was 2.6%. 72.0% of the population lived in owner-occupied housing units and 27.2% lived in rental housing units.

The median household income was $83,082 (+70.4% from 2000), and the median family income was $87,641 (+53.9% from 2000). The median per capita income for the CDP was $35,410 (+62.1% from 2000). For comparison, statewide California median per capita income in the 2010 Census was $27,885 (+22.8% from 2000).

=== Income and poverty ===
In 2023, the US Census Bureau estimated that the median household income in 2023 was $108,750, and the per capita income was $64,330. About 22.2% of families and 19.3% of the population were below the poverty line.

== Government ==
Graton is represented by the following elected officials:

- Sonoma County Board of Supervisors (District 5): Lynda Hopkins (Dem)
- California State Assembly: Chris Rogers (Dem)
- California State Senate: Mike McGuire (Dem)
- U.S. House of Representatives (2nd District): Jared Huffman (Dem)
- U.S. Senate: Alex Padilla (Dem) and Adam Schiff (Dem)

== Education ==
The school districts are Oak Grove Union Elementary School District and West Sonoma County Union High School District.

== Notable people ==
- George Segal, Academy Award–nominated actor and musician
- Ned Kahn, artist, sculptor, MacArthur Fellow
