= Grape cultivation in California =

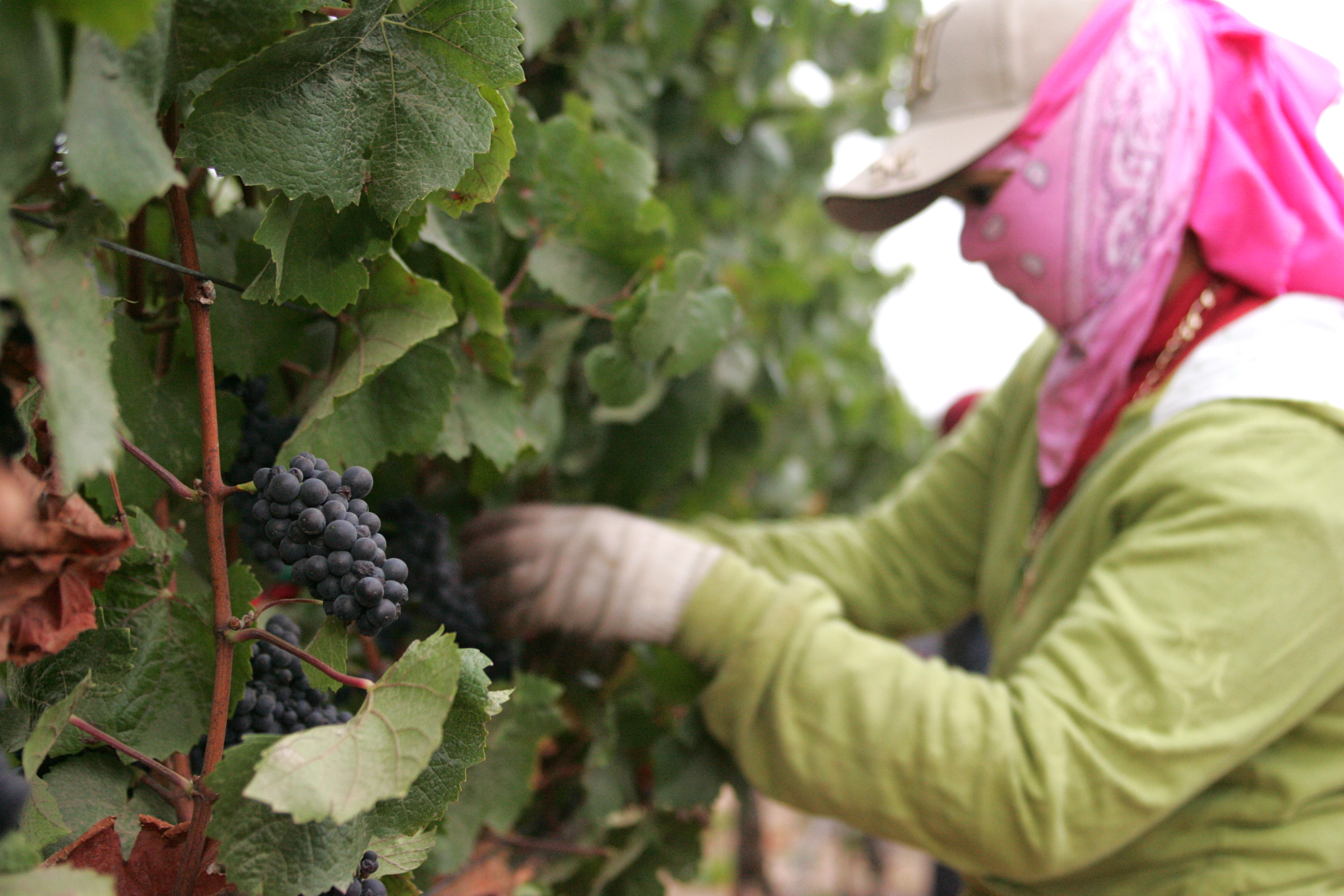
Pinot Noir harvest, Central Coast

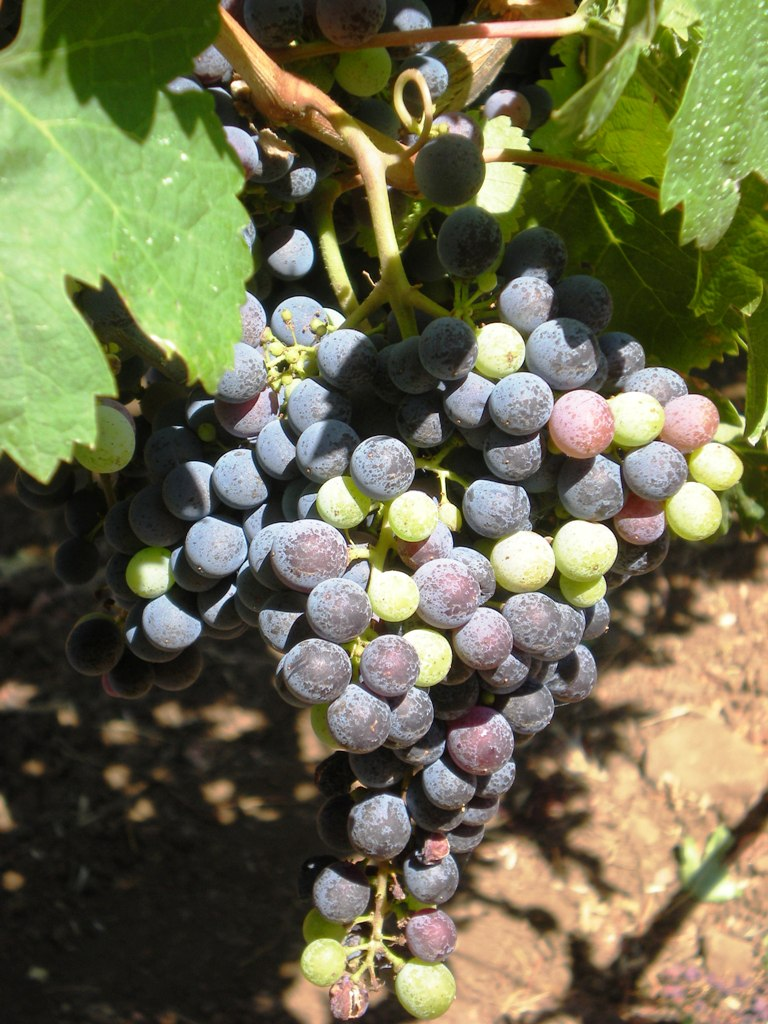
Sonoma

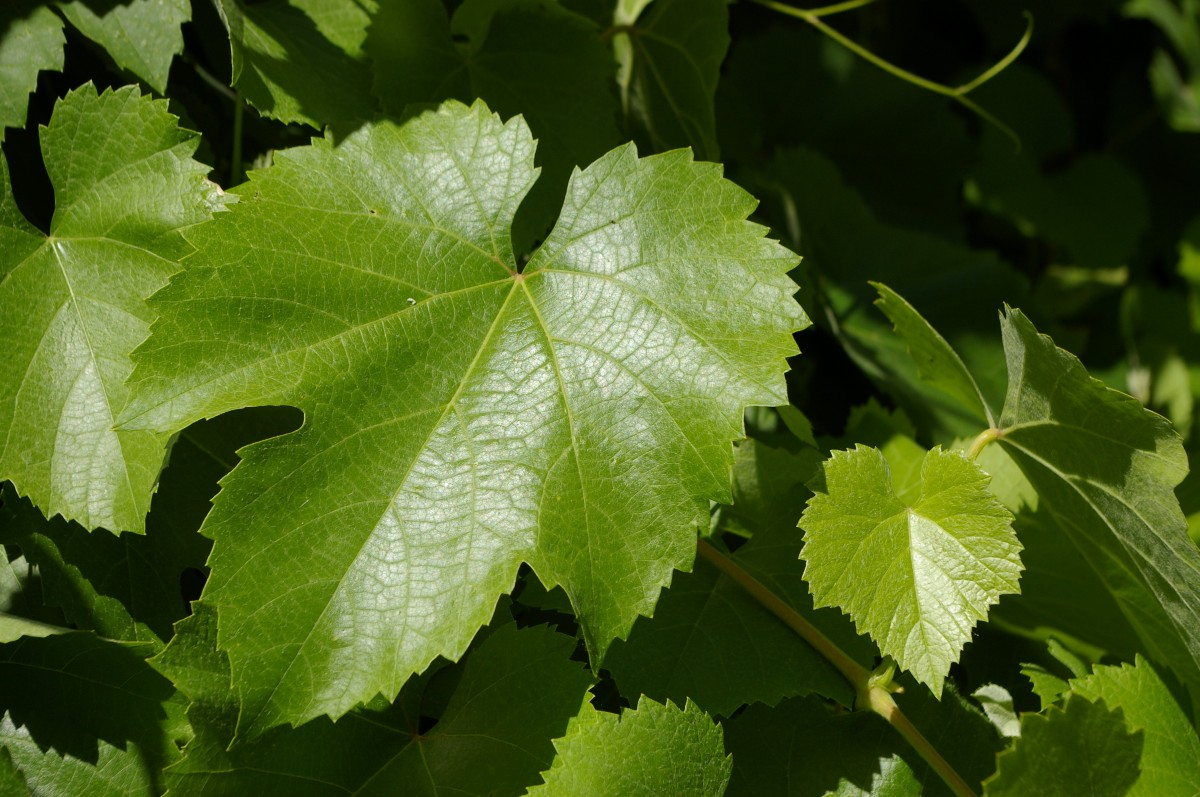
Caswell Park, V. californica, a wild type used as root stock and for §Breeding

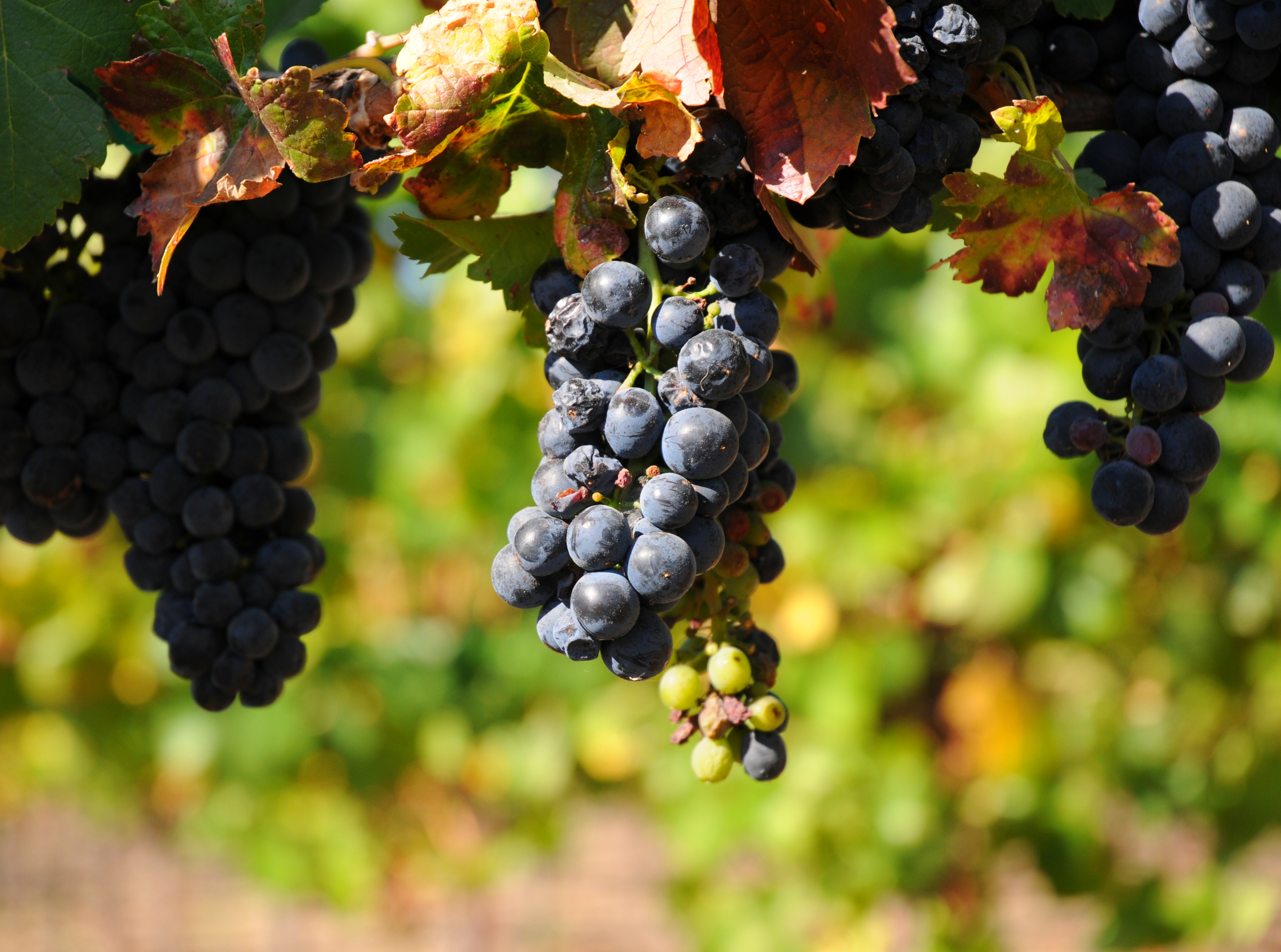
Rodney Strong Vineyards

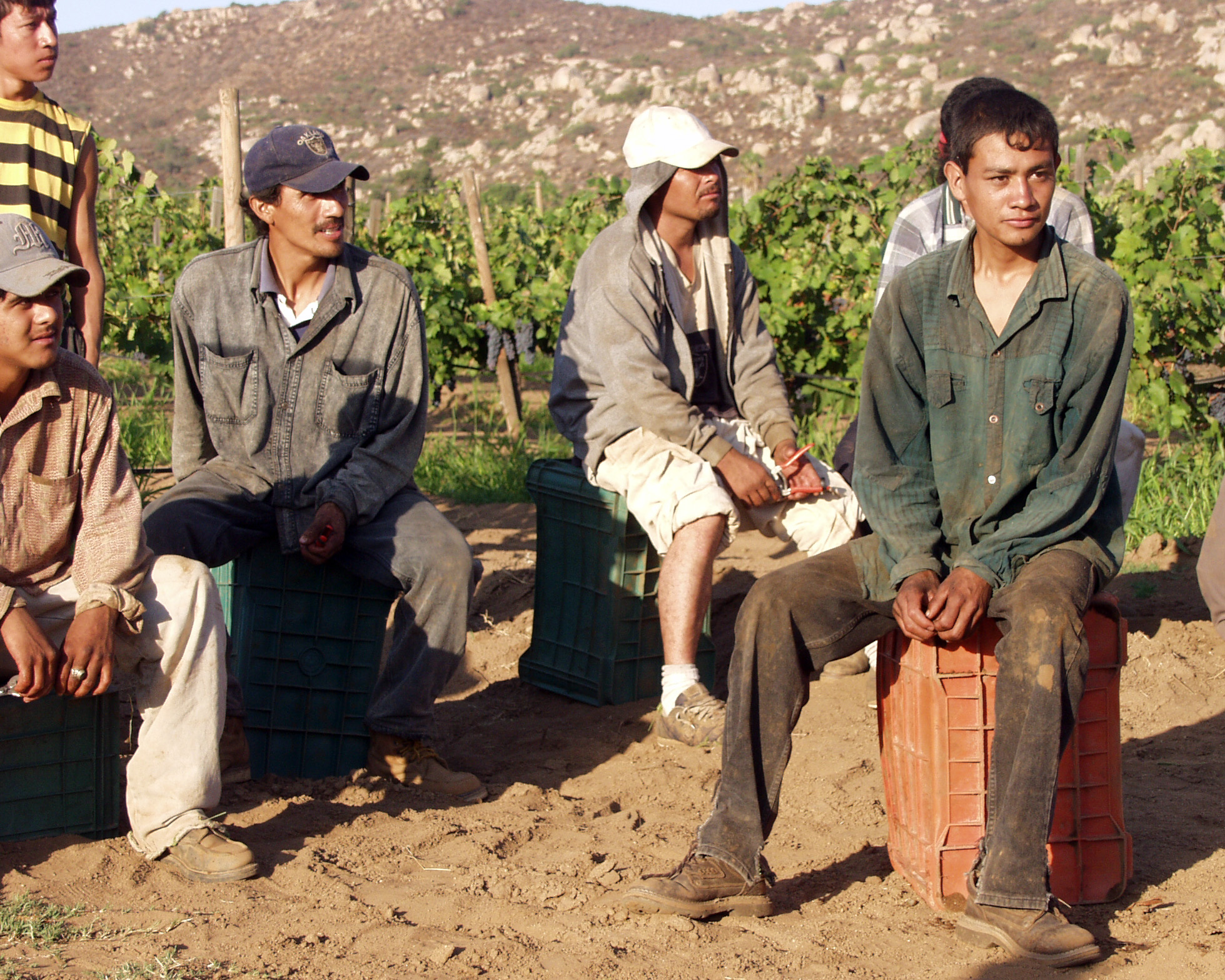

The 2020 table grape harvest was worth $2.12 billion while wine grapes brought in $1.7 billion, down 15.3% year-on-year. By weight, this was 17% lower versus 2018. The next year, 2021 saw a much better yield. From 829,000 acres (335,000 ha) viniculturists got 6.94 short tons per acre (15.6 t/ha) for a total harvest of 5,755,000 short tons (5,221,000 t). At an average of $909 per short ton ($1,002/t) they were paid $5,229,902,000 for the season. Of that, 4,844,600 short tons (4,394,900 t) were for destined for processing industries (including wine, see § Wine below) and at $835 per short ton ($920/t) that was worth $4,046,382,000. The fresh (table grape) harvest was 910,400 short tons (825,900 t) and selling at a price of $1,300 per short ton ($1,433/t), this sector was worth $1,183,520,000 for the season.

The table grape and wine grape sectors are represented by the Table Grape Commission and the California Association of Winegrape Growers.

Table production is most concentrated in three counties and somewhat in another two. Dollar value annually is $1,240 million in Kern, $682 in Tulare, $416 in Fresno, and in the top ten crops in Riverside and Madera. California's own consumption of table production grew from 1980 to 2001 from 1.8 to 3.5 kilograms (4.0 to 7.7 lb) per capita per year. Consumption here and throughout the country is so high that the country remains a net importer despite this state's production, which reached 71,000 short tons (64,000 t) in the 2015 table harvest.

During dormancy, UC IPM recommends pruning. UC IPM publishes recommendations for this and other tasks during dormancy. Although thinning is often proven to improve wine qualities in many areas, some reviewers note a lack of benefit in thinning table grapes in this state's vineyards.

Deyett et al., 2020 finds Proteobacteria are the most common components of the microbiomes of this crop in this state's soils.

This crop has also played a large part in farm labor relations in the state. The Delano grape strike began among table grape workers before spreading to other industries. See § Labor.

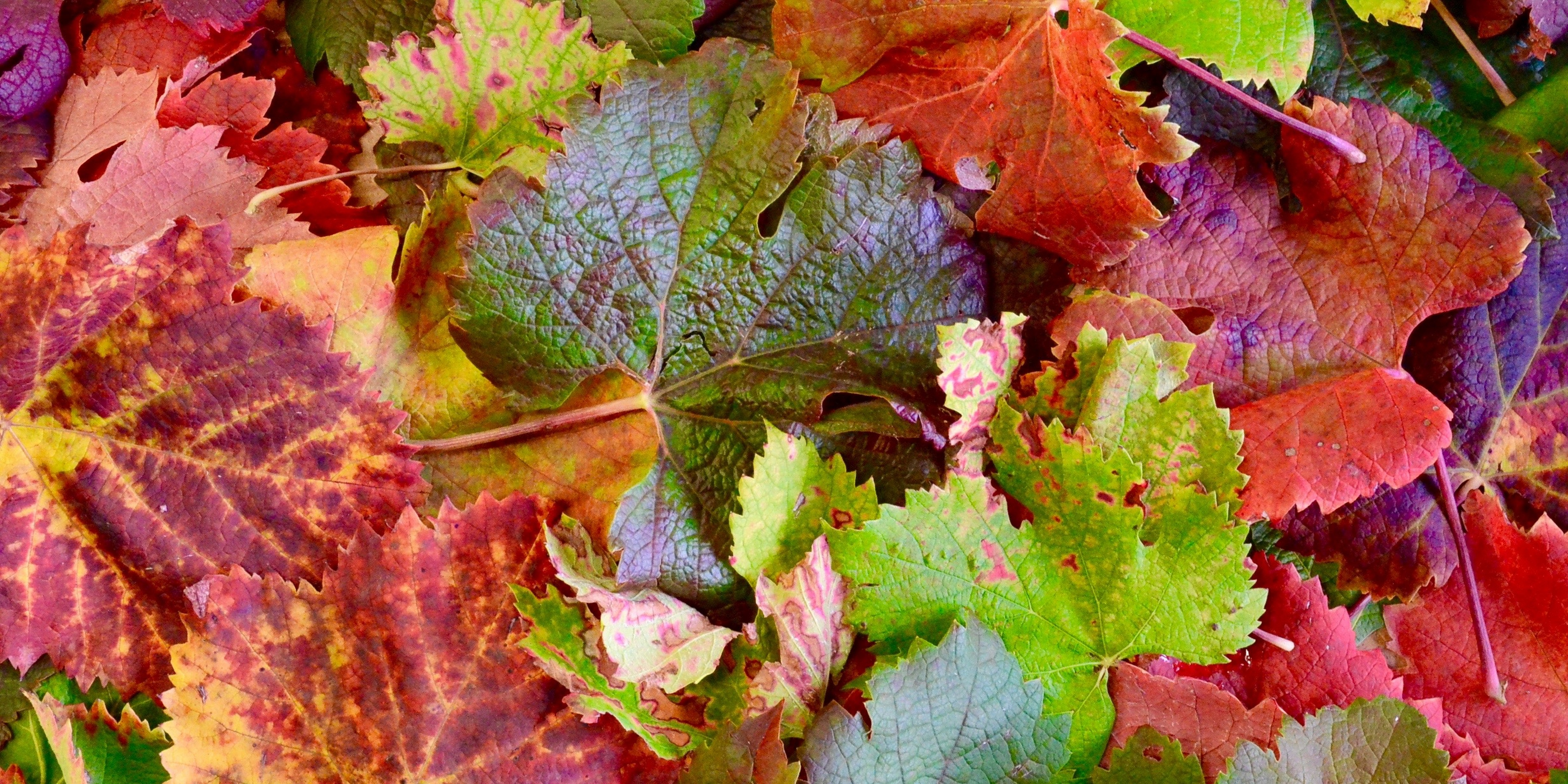
Leafroll, black measles, nutrient deficit

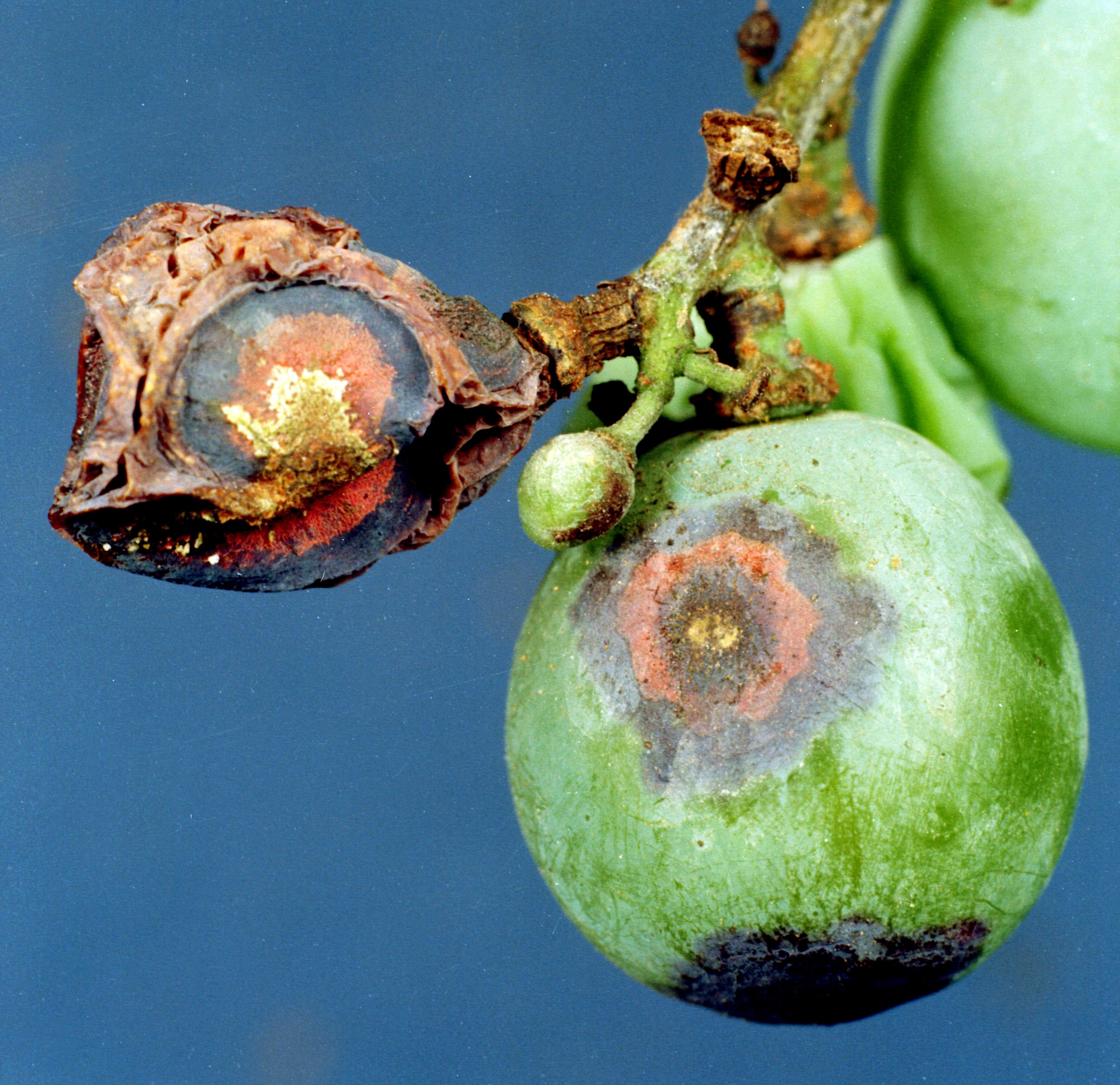
Grape anthracnose

== Diseases of grape ==
Disease information is provided by UC IPM.

Xylella fastidiosa was first discovered here in 1892 when Newton B. Pierce found Pierce's Disease in Los Angeles. Today it costs the state an estimated $100m per year. Because Vitis species native to the USA are tolerant to PD while the introduced European V. vinifera is very susceptible, Hewitt 1958 posited the Gulf Coastal Plain as the center of origin for the pathogen. However Nunney et al., 2010 demonstrates that the PD population of the USA is originally in Central America. Sisterson et al. 2020 finds that the southern San Joaquin Valley rarely has any X. fastidiosa prior to July. This suggests an entirely Glassy-Winged Sharpshooter vectored problem that has no (or very little) overwintering capacity. Consistent with this they also found that neonicotinoid applications tended to reduce PD incidence. See also § Pierce's Disease, § Glassy-Winged Sharpshooter and for a treatment see § Ozone.

Al Rwahnih et al., 2015 finds widespread Grapevine red blotch-associated virus (GRBaV) among raisin and table accessions of propagation material in California. The virus population here has an unusually low amount of genetic diversity. Although not known outside of North America, Al Rwahnih et al. does find this virus in California material originating outside North America. See § Red Blotch Disease of Grapevine.

UCD's FPS performs disease testing, vinestock identification testing, and supplies vinestock. FPS is one of the few National Clean Plant Network (NCPN) members holding vinestock for grapes in the country. See also § Foundation Plant Services.

The Canadian Food Inspection Agency has a good opinion of the state's phytosanitary certification system. As a result, CFIA's Plant Protection Division has approved California plant material for import.

Hoffman et al., 2011 surveys the Lodi AVA and finds that growers themselves (including those who also work as educators for other growers) are most central to the spread of management information. Those who are not themselves growers, but are full time educators, are less connected to the actual spread of information.

Powdery Mildew (Uncinula necator) is another costly disease here. PM cost the industry $239 million in 2015, including losses and treatment costs, according to the estimate of Sambucci et al., 2019. For decades both the programs of USDA ARS and SunWorld have prioritized breeding for resistance to this disease.

Afflictions in grapevine around the world are often treated by removal and replanting, and this is often used in this state's industry. Regrowth is slow and replant disease often results from this. Westphal et al., 2002 finds that regrowth is hampered by the soil microbiome in California's soils. They apply a supplemental plant growth-promiting rhizobacteria (PGPR) treatment using arbuscular mycorrhizal fungi (AMF) and achieve quicker productivity recovery. This is one of the few studies in this technique and this area is understudied.

It is speculated that drought stress will increase fungal pathogen geographic range in the future around the world, but in this state this has already been observed.

Although famous for its devastation of strawberry gray mold affects table grape as well. Karabulut et al., 2003 finds it is an especially large part of post-harvest losses. They also describe common treatments and make recommendations See § Gray mold and for a treatment see § Ozone.

Grapevine Trunk Diseases are common in California. They are not caused by any one pathogen but are united by their similar symptomology in this part of the grape plant.

Botryosphaeria Grape Trunk Dieback diseases are common trunk diseases. In the southern parts of the state, a Botryosphaeria Dieback caused by Lasiodiplodia theobromae is almost always the only trunk disease in this crop.

Eutypa dieback is another common trunk dieback here, caused by Eutypa lata. It was first found here by English et al., 1962 a few years after its discovery elsewhere. Travadon et al., 2011 finds that E. lata is an entirely or almost entirely sexual population here but asexual reproduction may be a rare occurrence. E. lata populations in California are shared between three hosts, this one, apricot and willow (Salix spp.). Travadon et al. 2015 finds high gene flow and an absence of differentiating alleles between populations on these hosts. (See also § Apricot.) Additionally they find no differentiation by geography.

Xiphinema index (the California Dagger Nematode, or just Dagger Nematode) is a common disease here. Although first discovered in this state it has spread throughout the world's vineyards.

Esca (Measles, Spanish Measles, Black Measles) is a basidiomycete disease caused by several species of the Fomitiporia. It is a common cause of economic loss in the state. Vasquez 2007 assessed losses $2,000 to $3,000 per hectare ($810 to $1,210/acre) for all afflictions called "Esca" in the state's vineyards.

Grapevine Pinot gris virus (GPGV) was imported in infected 'Touriga National' in 1981 and maintained at UCD, but no epidemic has ever been documented from that contamination. The California epidemic began decades later. Al Rwahnih 2018 documents an active epidemic in the Napa Valley AVA and finds wide variation in occurrence per variety, from 8.7 to 100%.

== Pests of grape ==
For insect pests see § Glassy-winged sharpshooter (GWSS) and § Blue-Green Sharpshooter (BGSS).

The arrival of the European Grapevine Moth (EGVM) in Napa County in 2009 brought together local, state and federal agricultural officials, scientists in California universities, and the wine, table and raisin industries. Together they brought about an eradication by 2015 and the effort was declared a success in August 2016. There is ongoing concern that it will invade again. Gutierrez et al., 2012 finds that climate change has increased its potential invasive range on this crop in the time since its eradication, and will continue to do so. See § European Grapevine Moth.

Some vertebrate pests are also significant and UC IPM has management recommendations for them:

- Birds
- California Ground Squirrels (Otospermophilus beecheyi)
- Deer
- Pocket Gophers
- Rabbits
- Voles,
  - especially the California Vole (Microtus californicus)
  - Meadow Voles (Microtus drummondii)
  - Meadow Mice (Microtus pennsylvanicus)

Delayed-dormancy in table grape varieties is February in the San Joaquin Valley and December to January in the Coachella Valley. UC IPM provides sampling techniques and management information for delayed-dormancy in table grape.

Budbreak is in March in the SJV and January to February in the Coachella Valley for common table varieties. UC IPM provides monitoring and treatment information for budbreak.

The rapid shoot growth phase is March to May in the San Joaquin Valley and February to May in the Coachella Valley. UC IPM recommends looking for spider mites and their natural enemies at this time. See § Spider mites.

During postharvest in the SJV, table grape growers should monitor for European Fruit Lecanium Scale (Parthenolecanium corni). UC IPM provides information on this and other pests of postharvest in table grape. They recommend some parasitoids for biological control including Aphytis spp., Coccophagus spp., Encarsia spp., and Metaphycus luteolus.

Its anticipated damage to this crop was one of the major reasons for the passage of the LBAM Act of 2007. Despite expectations, this crop was not sufficiently impacted to justify the cost and controversy involved and the action is regarded as a failure. See § Light Brown Apple Moth.

The Western Grapeleaf Skeletonizer (Harrisina metallica, syn. H. brillians) is a native pest of this crop. The parasitoids Ametadoria misella and Apanteles harrisinae were imported in the 1950s but without success. However A. misella was found in the 1990s to be a vector of a granulovirus of this pest. WGS is multivoline, trivoltine in the Central Valley and bivoltine on the coasts because temperatures are lower.

The Vine Mealybug (Planococcus ficus) (Signoret (Homoptera: Pseudococcidae)) is a pest introduced in the early 1990s. It has spread quickly, impacting vine culture due to its phloem-feeding habit and because it is a vector of GLRaV. See also § GLRaV.

Thrips are a minor concern in wine and raisin but are significant pests in table varieties. This includes Grape Thrips (Drepanothrips reuteri) and Western Flower Thrips. The scarring that they cause defaces the appearance of table grapes. Grape Thrips in Salvador is especially problematic. See § Western Flower Thrips.

Five species of ant are significant in this crop: Argentine Ants (Linepithema humile), Gray Ants (Formica aerata, Formica perpilosa), Pavement Ant (Tetramorium caespitum), Southern Fire Ant (Solenopsis xyloni) and Thief Ant (Solenopsis molesta).

The Black Vine Weevil is mostly a pest of the Central Coast AVA but does rarely occur elsewhere. Treatment is possible but is usually not employed. See § Black Vine Weevil.

Orange Tortrix (Argyrotaenia franciscana) is a native pest of this crop. It is endemic to this state and Oregon and Washington. UC IPM recommends restricting use of insecticides to control Orange Tortrix because many natural biological controls are present in the state.

Pseudococcus mealybugs are common pests in California's vineyards. They have become an increasing problem in the first half of the 2010s. Three species are present: Grape Mealybug (P. maritimus), Longtailed Mealybug (P. longispinus) and Obscure Mealybug (P. viburni).

Phylloxera of Grape is a common aphid in California with multiple subpopulations derived from multiple foreign points of origin producing multiple invasions. The rootstock AxR#1 was formerly used due to its resistance but this has since collapsed and been replaced by other rootstocks. This phylloxera has since that time adapted to these various rootstocks. Corrie et al., 2002, Lin et al., 2006, Vorwerk & Forneck, 2006 develop microsatellite markers to track these multiple invasions and their adaptation. See § Phylloxera of Grape and § AxR#1.

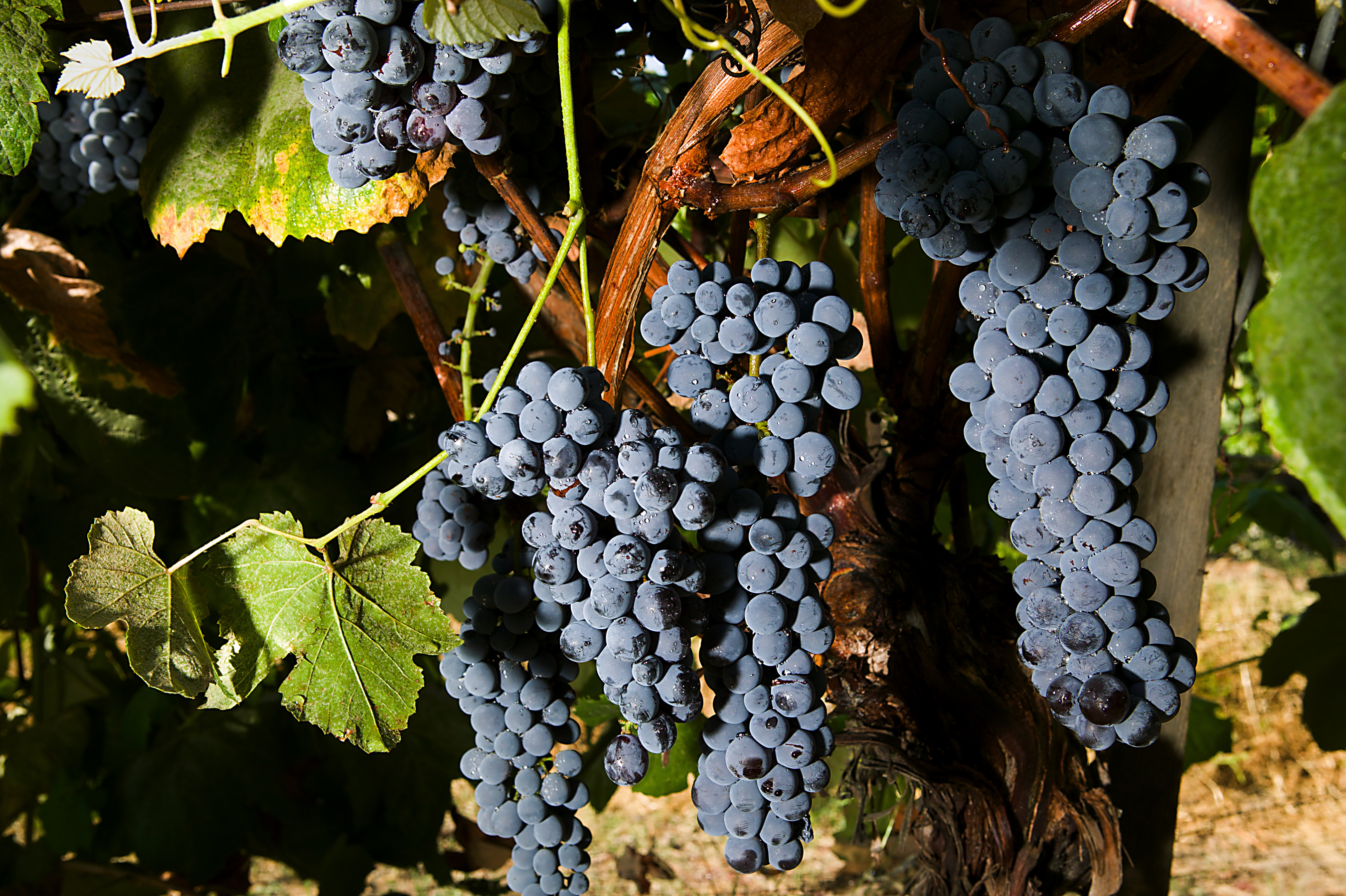
Thomcord breeding, Parlier

== Breeding of grape ==
This state has the largest breeding program for table grape in the country. The next largest is at the University of Arkansas, and that was started in part from varieties developed here. Many widely used table varieties have been developed here, such as 'Perlette' and 'Red Globe' from Harold Olmo at UCD, and the 'Flame Seedless' in 1973 and 'Fantasy Seedless' in 1994 by the USDA program in Fresno.

Although there is some resistance to Pierce's Disease in some Vitis vinifera varieties, none is immune – none will be productive and all will die. The Walker group at UC Davis has discovered several monogenic and polygenic PD resistances in several other Vitis spp. A few years later in December 2019, their Camminare Noir, Paseante Noir, Errante Noir, Ambulo Blanc, and Caminante Blanc were plant patented and released for licensing.

AxR#1 was a very popular rootstock here until the 1980s for its protection against grape phylloxera. Since the collapse of AxR#1's phylloxera resistance it has been replaced by a wide diversity of rootstocks. See also § Phylloxera of Grape.

Fuller et al., 2014 finds Powdery Mildew resistance in grape (Erysiphe necator) is so valuable in the state's AVAs and the technique of blending has so improved that PM-resistant type are becoming increasingly adopted, despite their history of consumer rejection due to off flavors. Riaz et al., 2011 finds 2 major PM resistance loci on chromosome 18 in many of California's grape strains, Run2.2 and Ren4. Ramming et al., 2011 find that in the San Joaquin Valley's table/E. necator and raisin/E. necator pathosystems almost all resistance is explained by Ren4. Fuller et al. 2014 also find that widespread adoption of such varieties would save growers as much as $48 million/year in California's Crimson Seedless table, raisin and Central Coast Chardonnay vineyards alone.

Table and raisin production are associated with higher temperature areas of the state.

The San Joaquin Valley Agricultural Sciences Center is located in Parlier. SJVASC produces varieties of table and raisin, including the Thomcord. Many of the state's table and raisin varieties have been produced using embryo rescue. The Ramming group in Parlier has been the source of many of these varieties since the 1980s. Their work includes incorporating wild North American V. arizonica and V. candicans into seedless raisin and table varieties.

UCD ceased releasing wine varieties in the 1980s. Then in 2019 they released 5 with high PD resistance to combat a problem which costs California grape growers over $100 million per year. This breeding program did not end with the release of these 5 and additional varieties continue to be released.

Intensive selective breeding has been ongoing in California since the 1950s for seedlessness in raisin and table. Much of the world's seedless varieties originate in this state's breeding efforts.

Aradhya et al., 2003 finds that California's accessions of germplasm originates from a single original gene pool. Aradhya finds that from this original gene pool there has been very active selective breeding primarily by cuttings.

Riaz et al., 2009 introgress PD resistance from into some of the state's susceptible varieties, and provide SSR markers for them. They introgressed 2 resistance alleles from V. arizonica that V. vinifera does not have. Accessions F8909-17 and F8909-08 are the sources of PdR1a and PdR1b respectively. Riaz also provide markers for marker-assisted breeding with these alleles.

Bowers et al., 1999 develops some of the foundational microsatellite markers for breeding of California Pinot noirs and Cabernet Sauvignons.

This et al., 2004 produces a set of standard references for molecular breeding of varieties used here. This develops a standard of microsatellites for California's most common vinestock and rootstock varieties to aid identification in breeding programs.

Roger's Red is an ornamental grape selected from a wild vine near Healdsburg. Initially the discoverer – Raiche of the University of California Botanical Garden Native Plant Collection – designated it a color variant of the native V. californica. This was doubted by many nurseries however and Dangl et al., 2010 finds it is a hybrid of V. californica × V. vinifera cv. Alicante Bouschet.

Vignani et al. 1996 demonstrates that several cultivars long grown in California, and thought to be local innovations, are instead clones of several Italian varieties.

Petite Sirah is a popular variety in this state. Meredith et al., 1999 determines that almost all California Petite Sirah is genetically identical to Durif.

Table and raisin varieties used here come from a very narrow base. Genetic testing by Bourisquot et al., 1995 find that because they are almost always seedless they are frequently directly derived from Kishmish. Bourisquot also find that about 1/3 of the state's table and raisin varieties are not derived as their pedigrees state.

== Genetic engineering of grape ==
Up to around 2004 there was little understanding of what non-Vitis genes might provide immunity in grape, and would make good transgenes. As of 2014 several candidate genes have been identified, several have been transferred, and some even produce immune factors that cross the graft union and so can be rootstock-only. Proven transgenes include pPGIP (the polygalacturonase-inhibiting protein from Pyrus communis L. cv 'Bartlett', identified by Stotz et al. at UCD) employed in a large number of transformations at several labs at UCD, HNEsp-HNE-GSTA-cecropin B (a protein chimera of pGIP and cecropin B) and PGIPsp-HNE-GSTA-cecropin B (another cecropin B chimera) from Dandekar et al. at UCD and Los Alamos, HxfA from the Kirkpatrick lab at UCD, an XfDSF catalyst (catalyzing the disease's synthesis of its diffusible signal factors) from Lindow et al. at UC Berkeley, and programmed cell death inhibitors from the Gilchrist lab at UCD. (See § Pierce's Disease.)

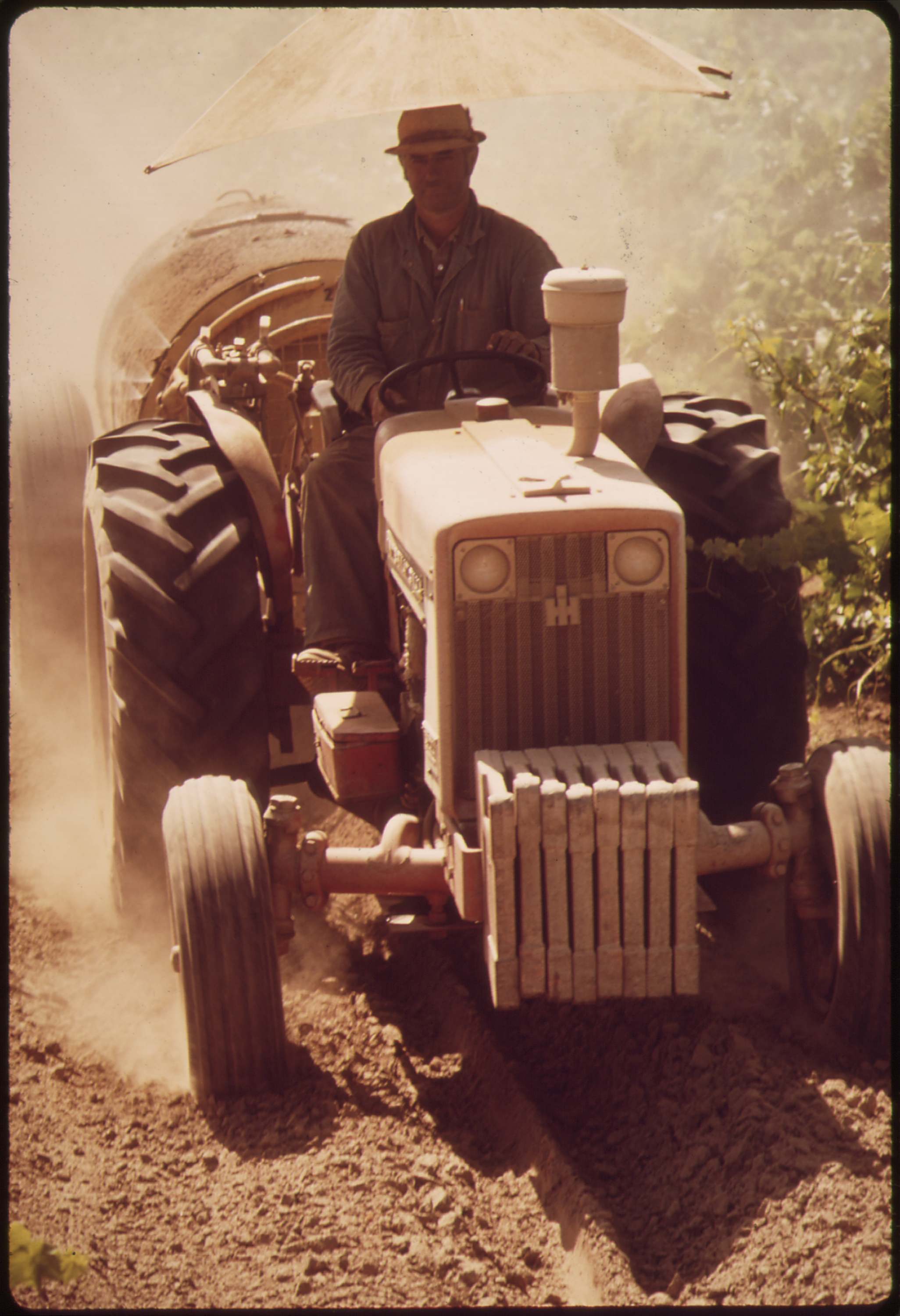
Fresno, 1972

== Treatments in grape ==
Zakowski & Mace 2022 finds heavy use of fungicides for cosmetic reasons in the state's table grape industry. Pruning produces wounds which may admit pathogens into the trunk of the vine. Brown et al., 2021 finds that pyraclostrobin continues to have good efficacy against populations in California. See § Pyraclostrobin and § Fungicide.

The General Beale Pilot Project has been very successful since the early 2000s in monitoring and reducing the deadly disease and vector combination of PD and GWSS. It is located in southeast Kern County and involves both trapping and roguing of infected vines. The infestation in Kern has been managed well with a combination of symptomology, molecular surveillance and quantitative vector surveys.

Prior to the 2000s there were no selective insecticides available for the most important pests of table grape. There was one – phosalone – which was banned in the state in 1988. Since then baits made of carbaryl have been formulated which act selectively and are used for cutworm in table grape, and Bacillus thuringiensis is used selectively for Omnivorous Leafroller and Grape Leaffolder.

Chlorpyrifos was a vital chemical for this crop until 2019 especially for the Vine Mealybug. In 2019 the state Department of Pesticide Regulation (DPR) determined that it was necessary to withdraw virtually all chlorpyrifos registrations. Since then this has imposed a negative economic impact on the industry both due to higher costs for substitute treatments and due to control failures. See § Vine Mealybug.

Cover crops are used to produce several different kinds of pest and weed control. Ground cover may enhance spider pest control of herbivorous insects. Costello & Daane 1998 finds that ground cover in table grape increases Trachelas pacificus abundance but decreases Hololena nedra. Over all they find that this method is of limited effectiveness in table vineyards. UC IPM recommends considering the impact of a pesticide application on natural enemies and honey bees before applying to table vineyards.

Crab shell chitosan reduces postharvest Gray Mold in table grape in Fresno county. Romanazzi et al., 2009 tests table stock from several varieties commonly grown around Fresno and an isolate from USDA ARS in Parlier, Fresno county. By dissolving the shell material in an acid they achieve control of postharvest Gray Mold by inducing a defense prior to the fungus's invasion. Pichyangkuraa & Chadchawanb 2015 believe this to be applicable to viticulture around the world.

Karabulut et al., 2003 finds that many postharvest pathogen isolates in California's vineyards are well controlled by a yeast, Metschnikowia fructicola, applied as a spray shortly before harvest.

== Research in grape ==
Table grape growers are charged an assessment statewide for research and treatment for PD and GWSS. For the fiscal year 2009–2010 this contributed $735,000, almost all coming from the southern San Joaquin Valley. See § Pierce's Disease, § Glassy-Winged Sharpshooter and § Treatments in grape.
