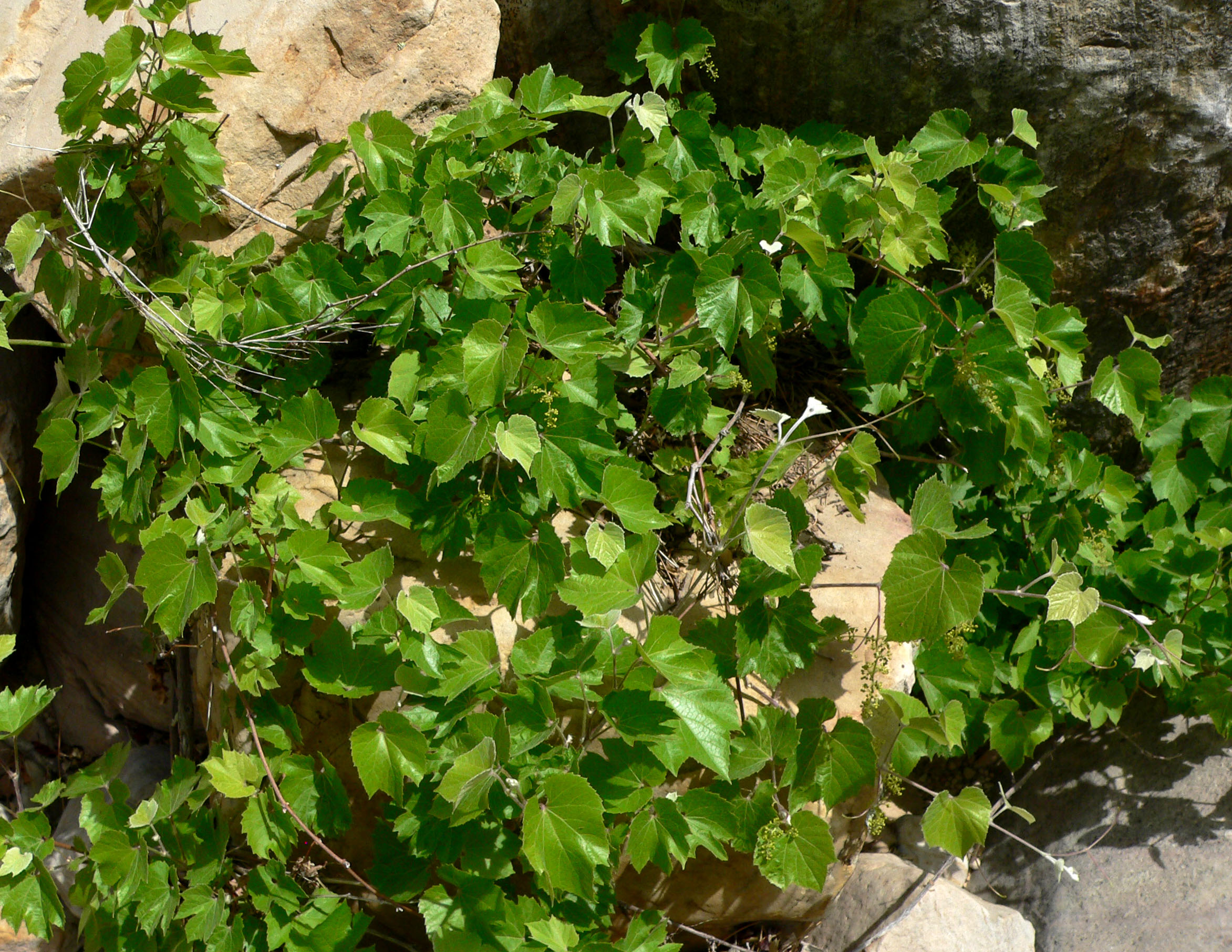
- Arizona grape in Icebox Canyon, Spring Mountains, southern Nevada

Scientific classification
- Kingdom: Plantae
- Clade: Tracheophytes
- Clade: Angiosperms
- Clade: Eudicots
- Clade: Rosids
- Order: Vitales
- Family: Vitaceae
- Genus: Vitis
- Species: V. arizonica

Binomial name
- Vitis arizonica Engelm. 1868 not S.Wats. 1875

Synonyms
- Vitis arizonica var. glabra Munson

= Vitis arizonica =

Arizona grape

Species of grapevine

Vitis arizonica is a North American species of wild grape. It is a deciduous vine.

Common names for the grape are Arizona grape, canyon grape, and uva del monte. It has historically been used as a food source by Indigenous peoples of the Southwest. Canyon grape can tolerate drought and cold temperatures. It grows in a variety of habitats including riparian zones and shady canyons. It can hybridize with mustang grape, sweet mountain grape, and California wild grape where their ranges overlap.

== Etymology ==
Vitis is Latin for "vine", while arizonica means "of or from Arizona". The plant was described by George Engelmann in 1871.

== Distribution ==
Arizona grape is found in California (Inyo County), Arizona, Nevada, New Mexico, western Texas, southern Utah, Sonora, Chihuahua, Coahuila, Durango, and Tamaulipas. Within Arizona, Vitis arizonica is found in all counties, except La Paz.

== Morphology ==
Form: Vine General: Woody vine, sprawling or weakly climbing; stems generally 2–6 m long; the young twigs densely woolly, but losing this over time and the bark becoming shreddy. Leaves: Winter deciduous; broadly cordate, 3–10 cm long and about as wide, irregularly toothed and sometimes shallowly 3-lobed, more-or-less cottony hairy; petiole 1–3 cm long; tendrils opposite the leaves, bifurcate, lacking adhesive discs, withering quickly if not attached to something. Flowers: Inflorescence a loose, open, strongly branched panicle, 2–10 cm long, emerging opposite the leaves; flowers tiny with five, white petals. Fruits: Edible (but sometimes bitter) grapes, 8–10 mm thick, black.

The canyon grape is a vigorously branching vine. Stems are slender, with significant tapering from base to apex. Fully developed leaves resemble a three-lobed heart shape and generally grow to an average of 4 inches long/wide. Leaves exhibit irregular toothed edge. Green flower buds develop in clusters, and small flowers bloom in a whitish green hue. Globe or ovate shaped fruit are typically 1/3-3/8 in diameter; immature fruit is green in color, developing into a deep purple or black. Fruit are clustered on red pedicels.

== Uses ==
Vitis arizonica has been used in breeding varieties resistant to Pierce's Disease. Canyon grape is edible with different individual plants being sweet and others being bitter. The fruit can be used for wine making and jams, but is mainly consumed by wildlife. It is consumed by both birds and mammals. Canyon grape has historically been used as a food source by many Indigenous peoples. Historically it was cultivated by the Pueblo, and was eaten both fresh or dried. Other tribes consumed it as well, such as the Chiricahua and Mescalero Apache. Both Native Americans and early European settlers would chew on grape leaves to quench their thirst. Aside from food, it was also used by the Havasupai to make toys, used by the Navajo in courtship rituals, and was used by the Jemez to make ritual items.

== Gallery ==
Vitis arizonica

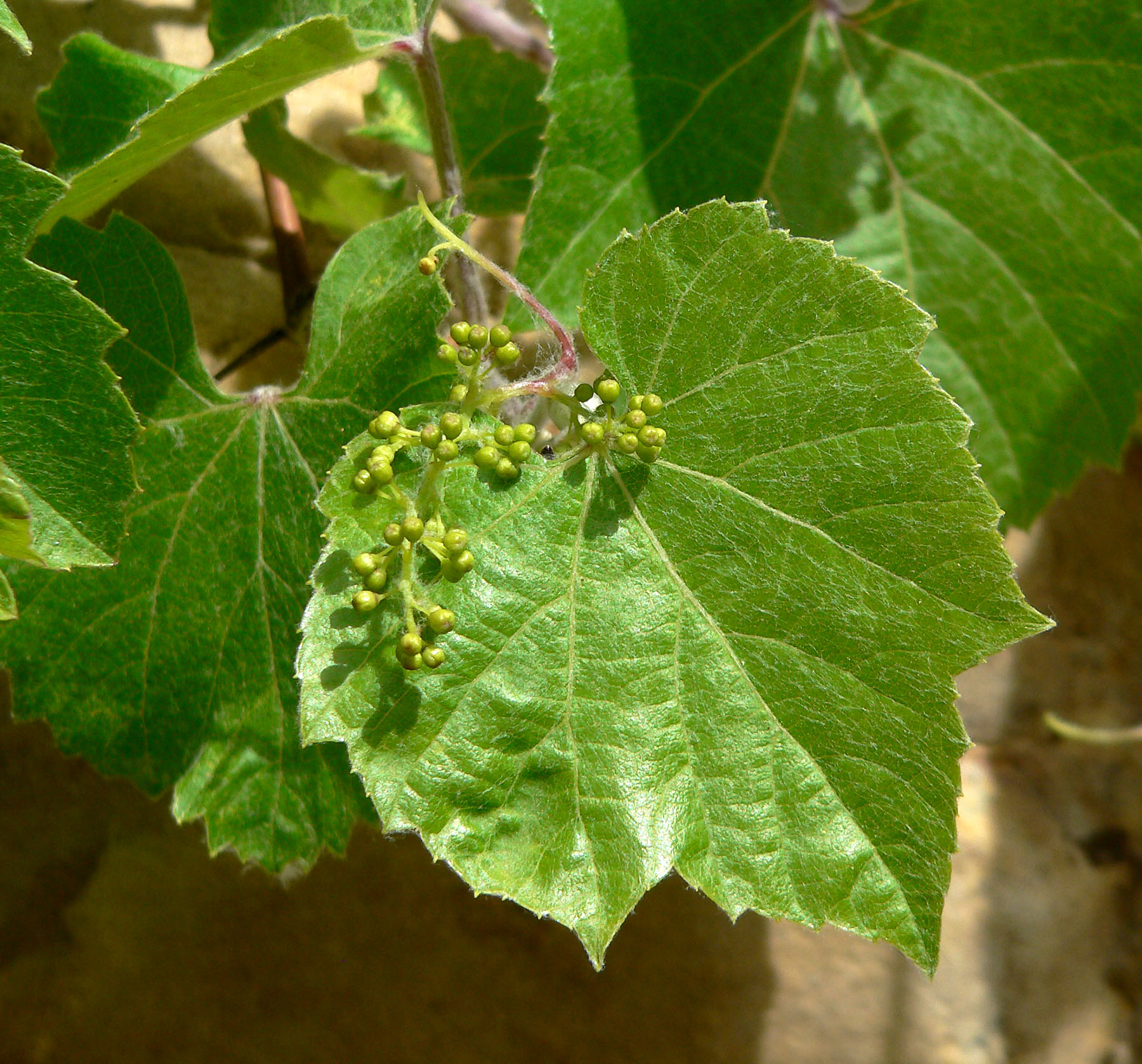

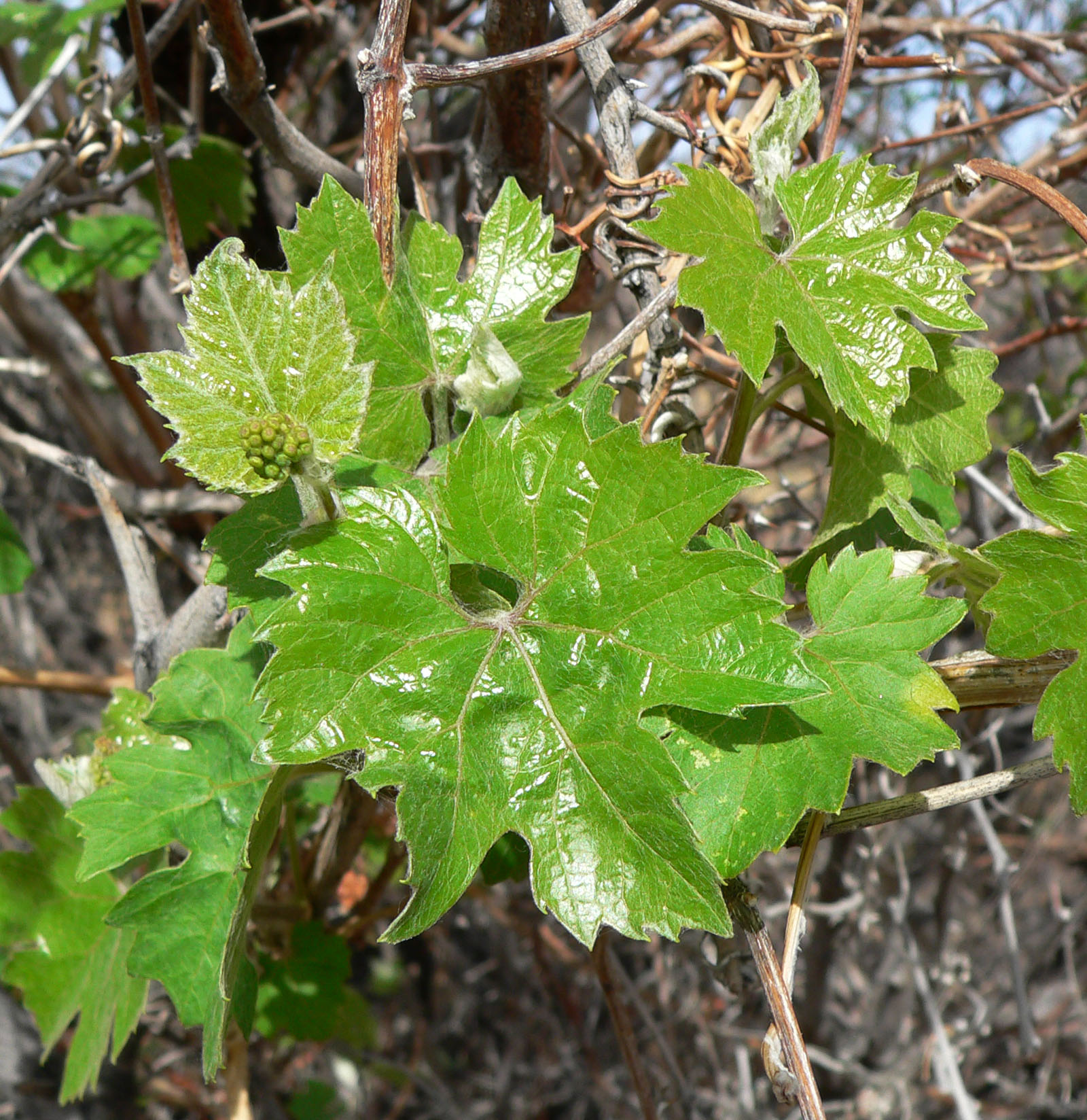

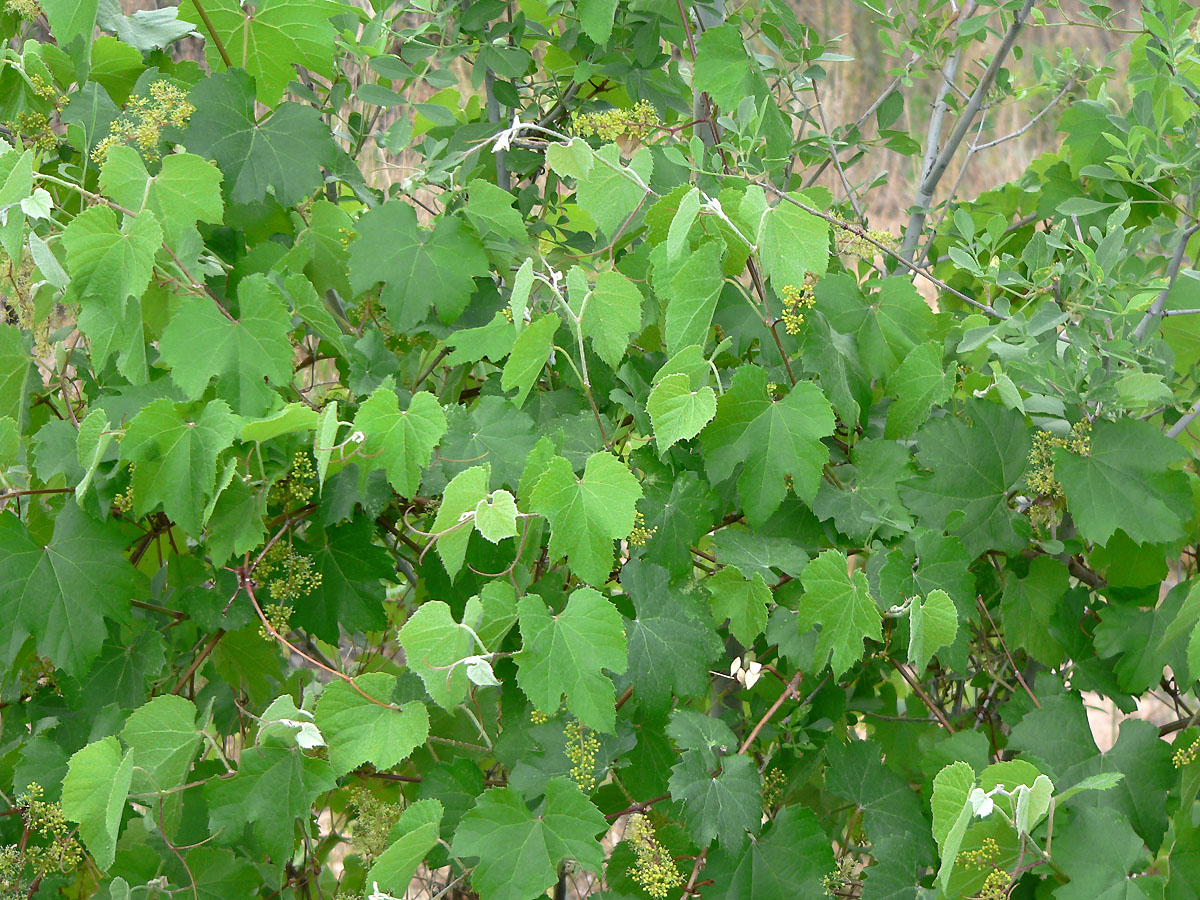

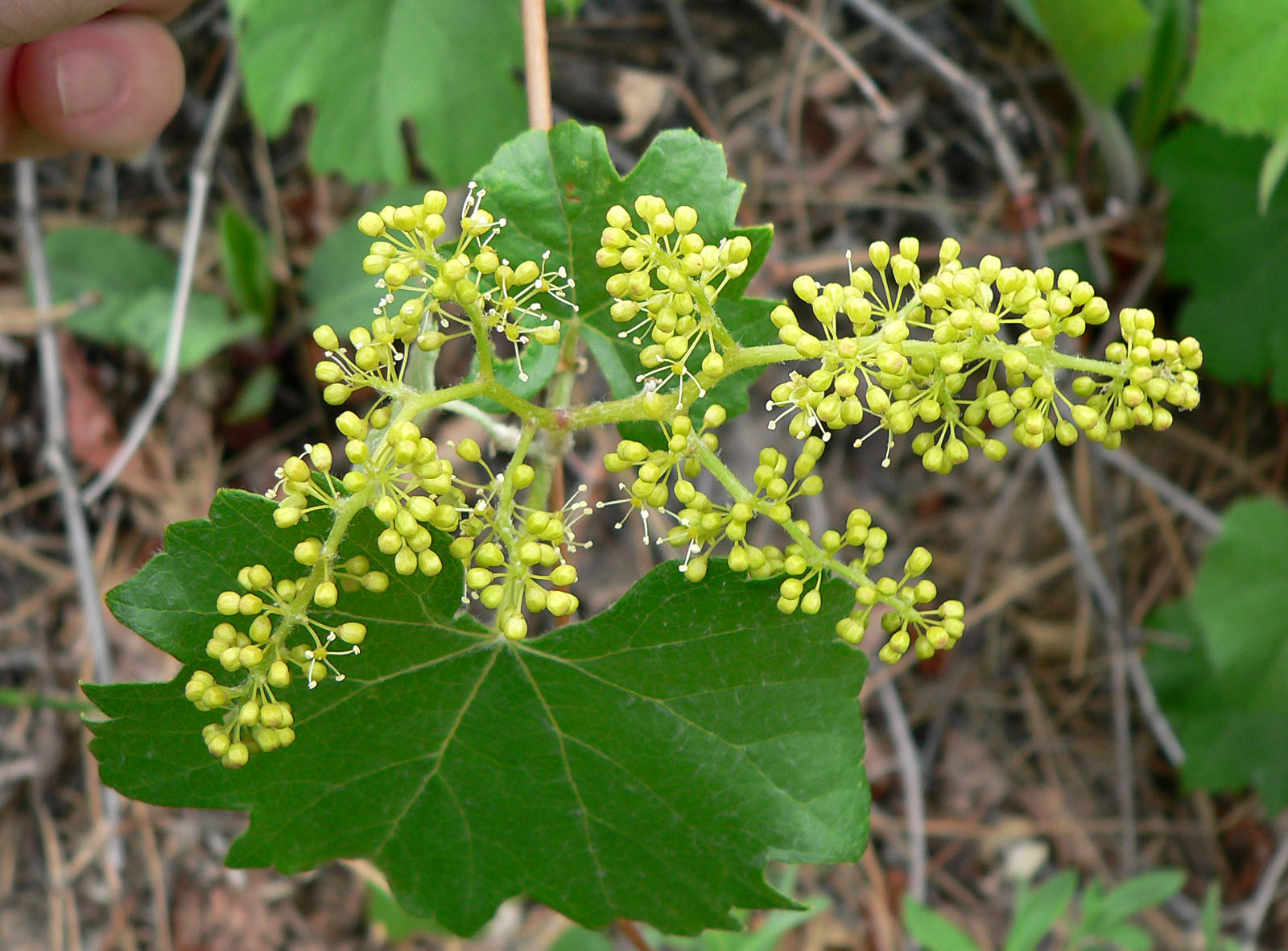

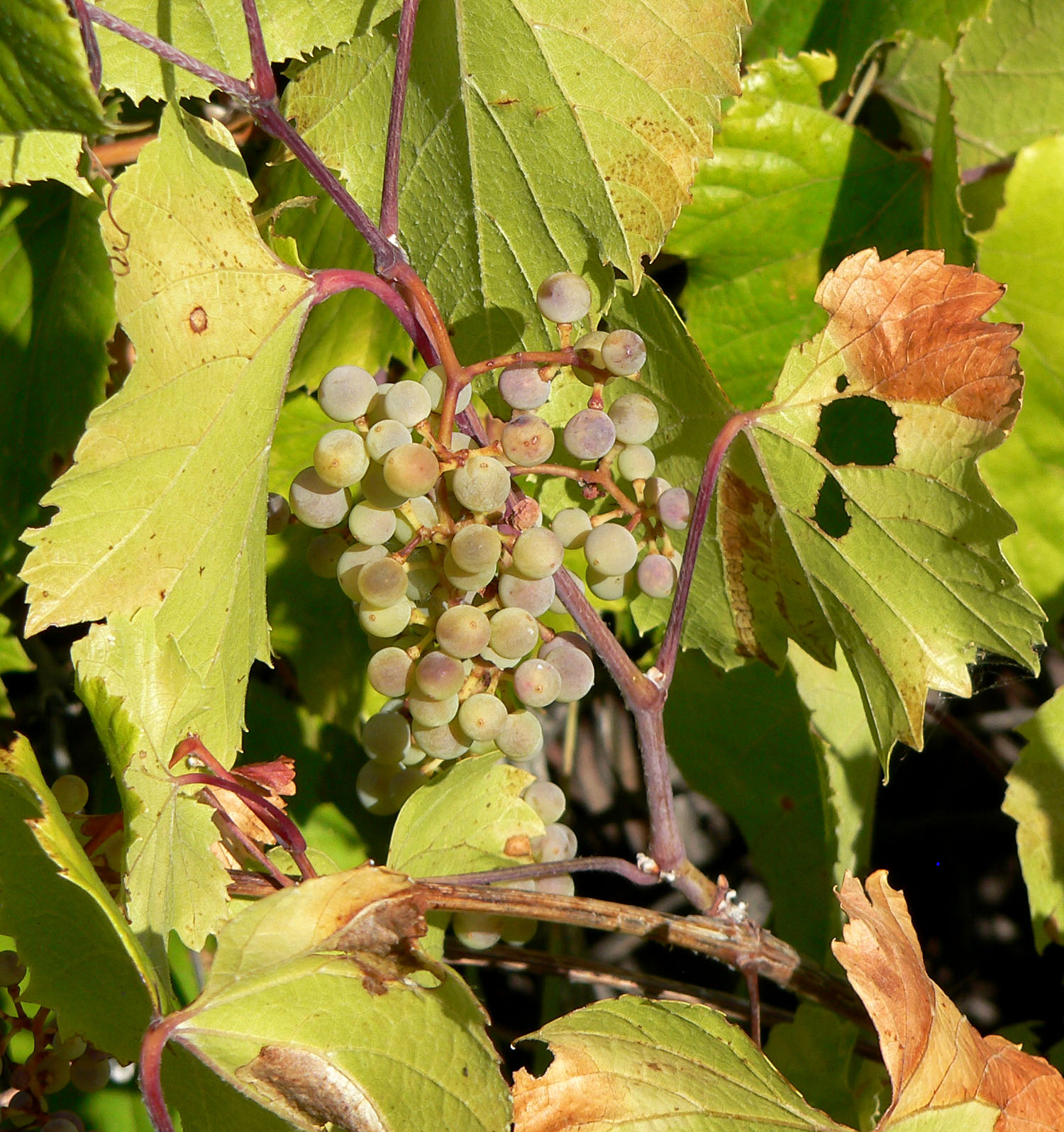

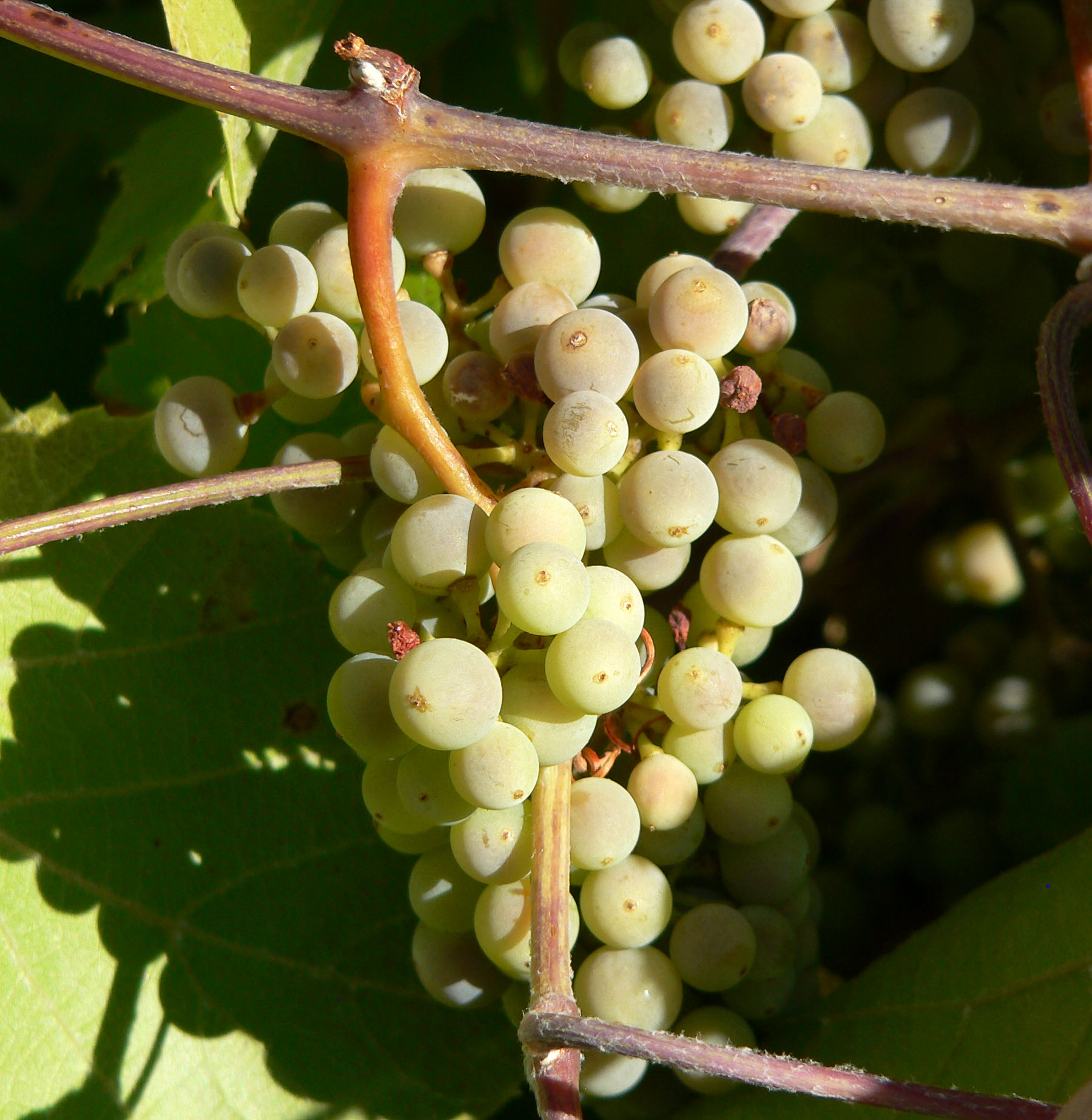

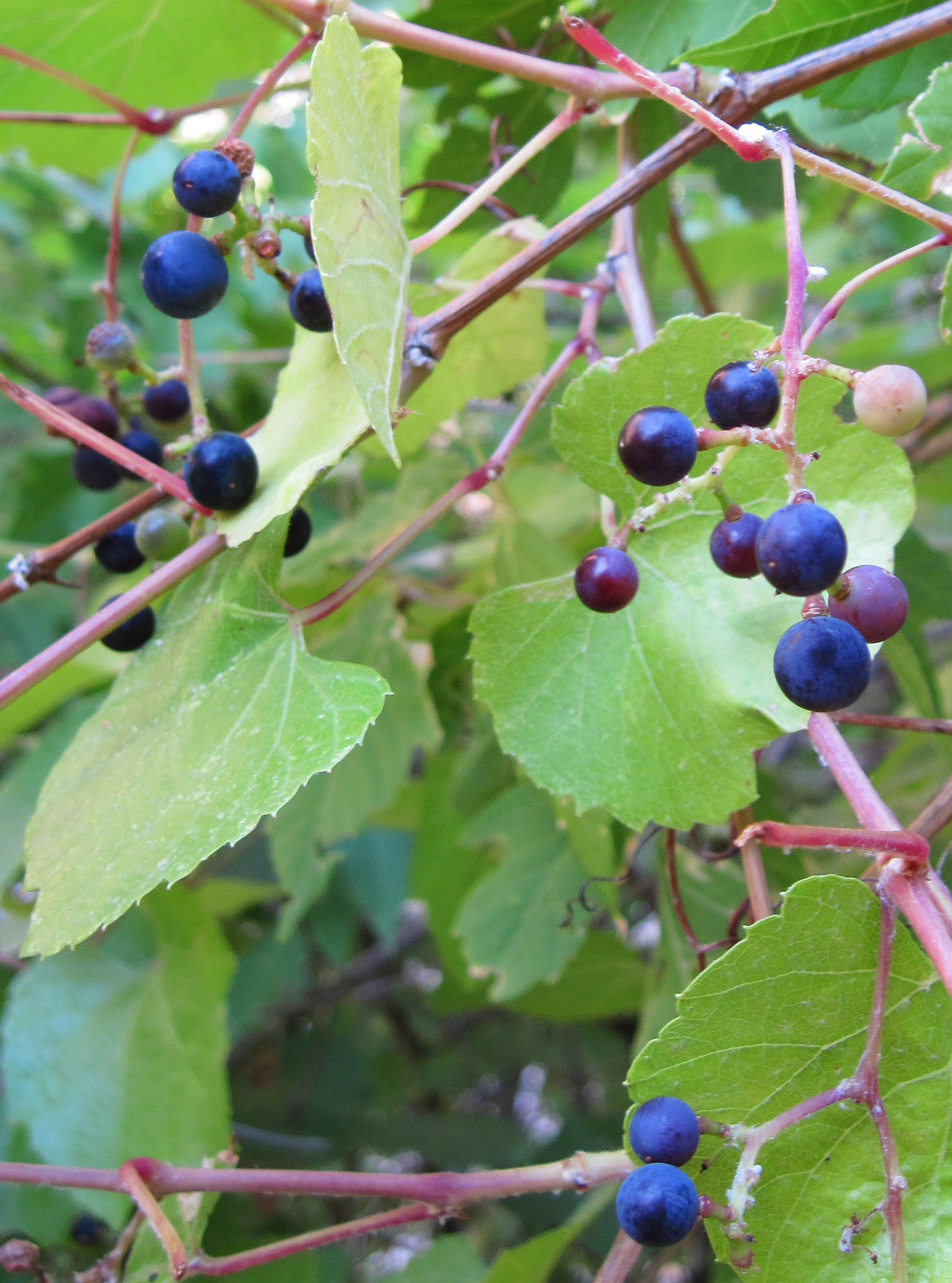
