= Ametadoria abdominalis =

Scientific classification
- Kingdom: Animalia
- Phylum: Arthropoda
- Class: Insecta
- Order: Diptera
- Family: Tachinidae
- Subfamily: Exoristinae
- Tribe: Eryciini
- Genus: Ametadoria
- Species: A. abdominalis

Binomial name
- Ametadoria abdominalis (Townsend, 1934)

Synonyms
- Abolodoria abdominalis Townsend, 1934

Species of fly

Ametadoria abdominalis is a species of tachinid flies in the genus Ametadoria of the family Tachinidae. It was originally placed in the genus Abolodoria, where it was the type (and only) species of the genus; Abolodoria was later found to be a synonym of Ametadoria in 2015.

== Distribution ==
Brazil.
