= Phosalone =

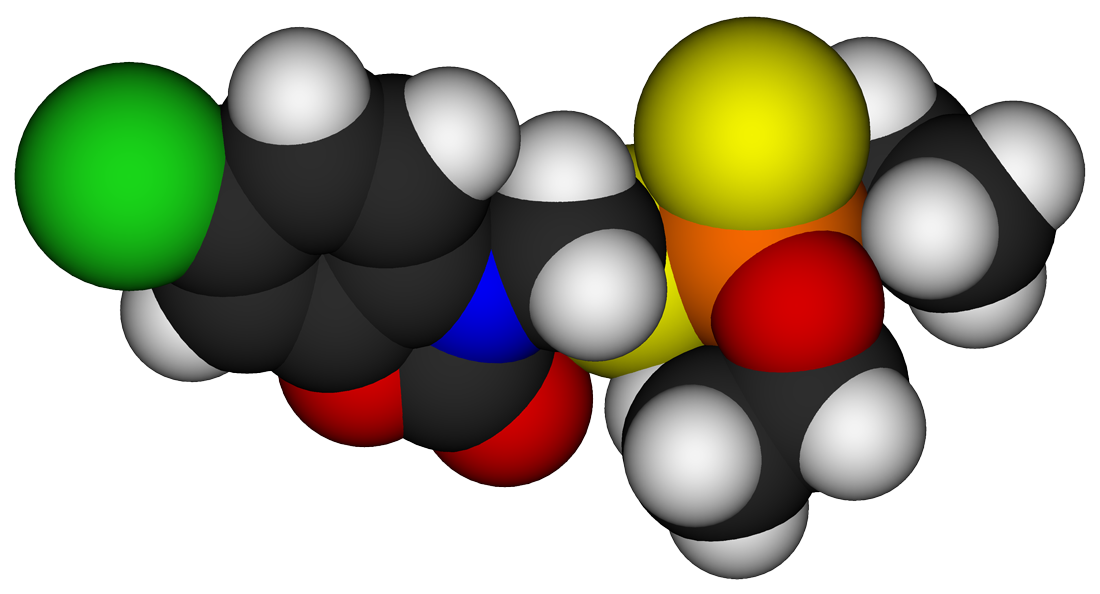

Names
- Preferred IUPAC name S-[(6-Chloro-2-oxo-1,3-benzoxazol-3(2H)-yl)methyl] O,O-diethyl phosphorodithioate
- Other names Zolone

Identifiers
CAS Number	2310-17-0
3D model (JSmol)	Interactive image
ChEBI	CHEBI:8121
ChEMBL	ChEMBL1528531
ChemSpider	4629
ECHA InfoCard	100.017.270
KEGG	C11028
PubChem CID	4793
UNII	448B85HT8M
CompTox Dashboard (EPA)	DTXSID1024259
- InChI: InChI=1S/C12H15ClNO4PS2/c1-3-16-19(20,17-4-2)21-8-14-10-6-5-9(13)7-11(10)18-12(14)15/h5-7H,3-4,8H2,1-2H3 Key: IOUNQDKNJZEDEP-UHFFFAOYSA-N; InChI=1/C12H15ClNO4PS2/c1-3-16-19(20,17-4-2)21-8-14-10-6-5-9(13)7-11(10)18-12(14)15/h5-7H,3-4,8H2,1-2H3 Key: IOUNQDKNJZEDEP-UHFFFAOYAA
- SMILES: Clc2ccc1c(OC(=O)N1CSP(=S)(OCC)OCC)c2

Properties
Chemical formula	C_{12}H_{15}ClNO_{4}PS_{2}
Molar mass	367.80 g·mol^{−1}
Appearance	Colorless crystalline
Odor	garlic
Density	1.39 g cm^{−3}
Melting point	47.5 to 48 °C (117.5 to 118.4 °F; 320.6 to 321.1 K)
Solubility in water	3.05 mg/L
Solubility	many organic solvents
- Except where otherwise noted, data are given for materials in their standard state (at 25 °C [77 °F], 100 kPa). verify (what is ?) Infobox references

Phosalone is an organophosphate chemical commonly used as an insecticide and acaricide. It is developed by Rhône-Poulenc in France but EU eliminated it from pesticide registration in December 2006.

The median lethal dose of oral exposure in rat is 85 mg/kg and that of dermal is 390 mg/kg.。It is a weak acetylcholinesterase inhibitor. It is taken by not only oral and inhalation but skin and it causes toxic symptoms peculiar to organophosphorus compounds such as miosis, hypersalivation, hyperhidrosis, chest pressure, pulmonary edema and fecal incontinence. It is flammable and decomposes to toxic gases such as phosphorus oxides, sulfur oxides and nitrogen oxides. It is harmful especially to water creatures.
