= Ametadoria =

Scientific classification
- Kingdom: Animalia
- Phylum: Arthropoda
- Clade: Pancrustacea
- Class: Insecta
- Order: Diptera
- Family: Tachinidae
- Subfamily: Exoristinae
- Tribe: Eryciini
- Genus: Ametadoria; Townsend, 1927

Type species
- Ametadoria unispinosa Townsend, 1927

Synonyms
- Abolodoria Townsend, 1934; Adidyma Townsend, 1935

Genus of flies

Ametadoria is a genus of flies in the family Tachinidae.

== Species ==
- A. abdominalis (Townsend, 1934) (Synonym: Abolodoria abdominalis Townsend, 1934)
- A. austrina (Coquillett, 1902) (Synonym: Sturmia austrina Coquillett, 1902)
- A. fuliginipennis (Wulp, 1890) (Synonym: Didyma fuliginipennis Wulp, 1890)
- A. harrisinae (Coquillett, 1897) (Synonyms: Sturmia harrisinae Coquillett, 1897, Erycia tuxedo Curran, 1930, Masicera unispinosa Reinhard, 1930)
- A. humilis (Wulp, 1890) (Synonym: Exorista humilis Wulp, 1890)
- A. karolramosae Fleming & Wood, 2015
- A. leticiamartinezae Fleming & Wood, 2015
- A. mauriciogurdiani Fleming & Wood, 2015
- A. misella (Wulp, 1890) (Synonym: Anisia misella Wulp, 1890)
- A. unispinosa Townsend, 1927 (Synonyms: Adidyma adversa Townsend, 1935, Ametadoria adversa (Townsend, 1935))
