= Rodney Strong Vineyards =

Winery in Healdsburg, California

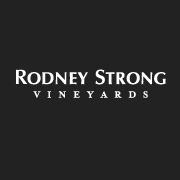
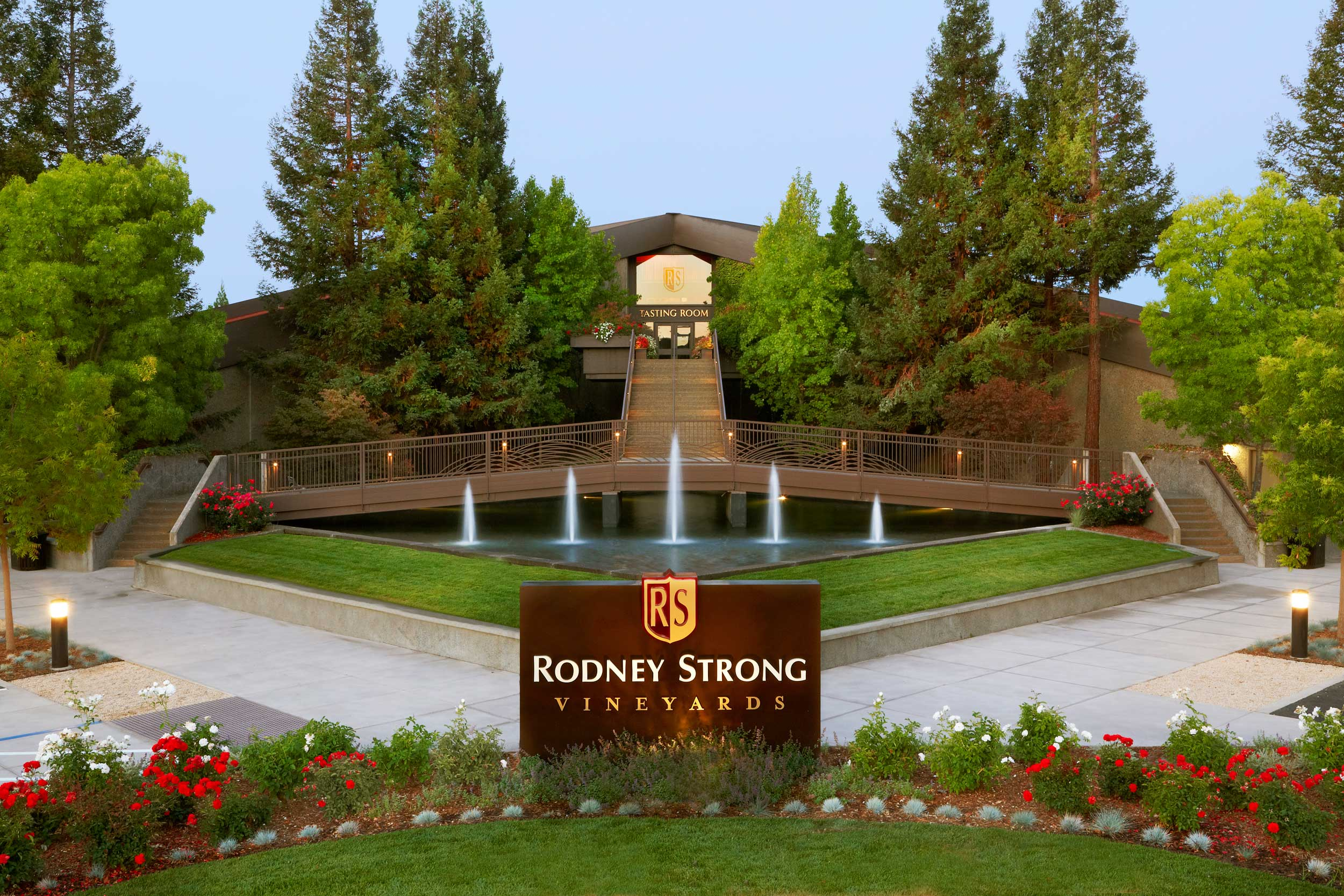
- Location: Healdsburg, California, United States
- Coordinates: 38.569677°N 38.569677°E
- Founded: 1959
- Key people: Tom Klein (Proprietor) Rick Sayre (Sr. Vice President of Winemaking)
- Varietals: Chardonnay, Sauvignon Blanc, Syrah, Zinfandel, Cabernet Sauvignon, Merlot, Pinot Noir, Port
- Website: www.rodneystrong.com

Rodney Strong Vineyards is a family-owned winery based in Healdsburg, California, United States. It was founded in 1959 by wine pioneer and former dancer, Rodney Strong, the winery focuses solely on Sonoma County grape growing and wines. Rodney Strong Vineyards sources from throughout Sonoma County and has 14 estate vineyards located in Alexander Valley, Russian River Valley, Chalk Hill, Sonoma Coast and Dry Creek Valley. It was recognized as American Winery of the Year in 2013 by Wine Enthusiast Magazine.

== About ==
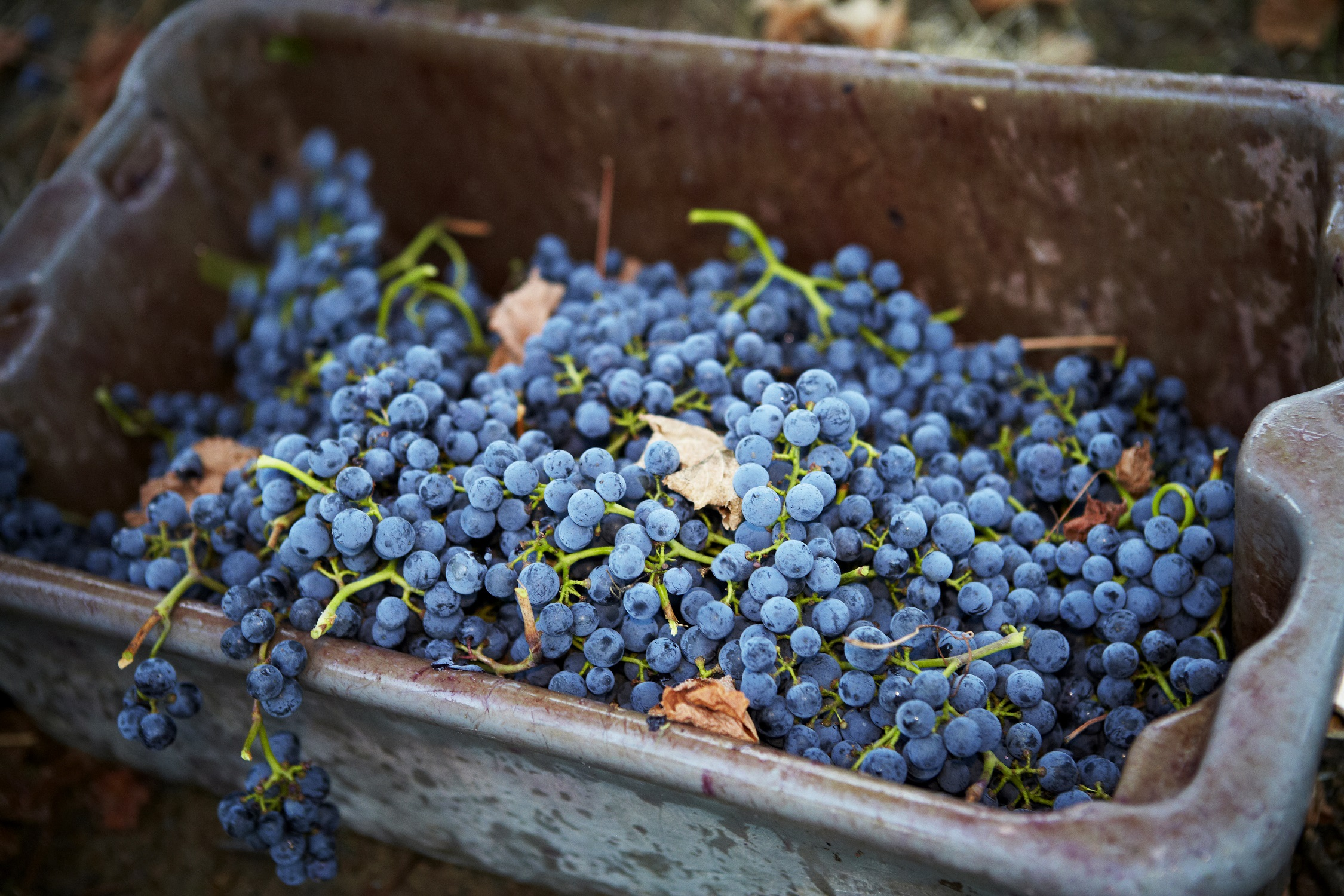
Grapes from the vineyard

Rodney Strong Vineyards was founded in 1959 by Rodney Strong, an American dancer and a pioneer in the wine industry. It was later purchased by the Klein family, a fourth generation California farming family, in 1989.

In 1991, Tom Klein became president of Klein Family Vintners and Rodney Strong Vineyards. Tom Klein proceeded to invest in winemaking innovation and production growth. Rick Sayre, Vice President of Winemaking, joined Rodney Strong Vineyards in 1979.

The winery farms 14 estate vineyards and sources grapes from vineyards throughout Sonoma County, focusing on Russian River Valley, Alexander Valley, Chalk Hill and Sonoma Coast. Rodney Strong Vineyards wines are estate-bottled, Sonoma County wines, including single varietal and single vineyard offerings. They are recognized for their sustainability efforts including fish friendly farming, solar energy production and being carbon neutral.

== History ==
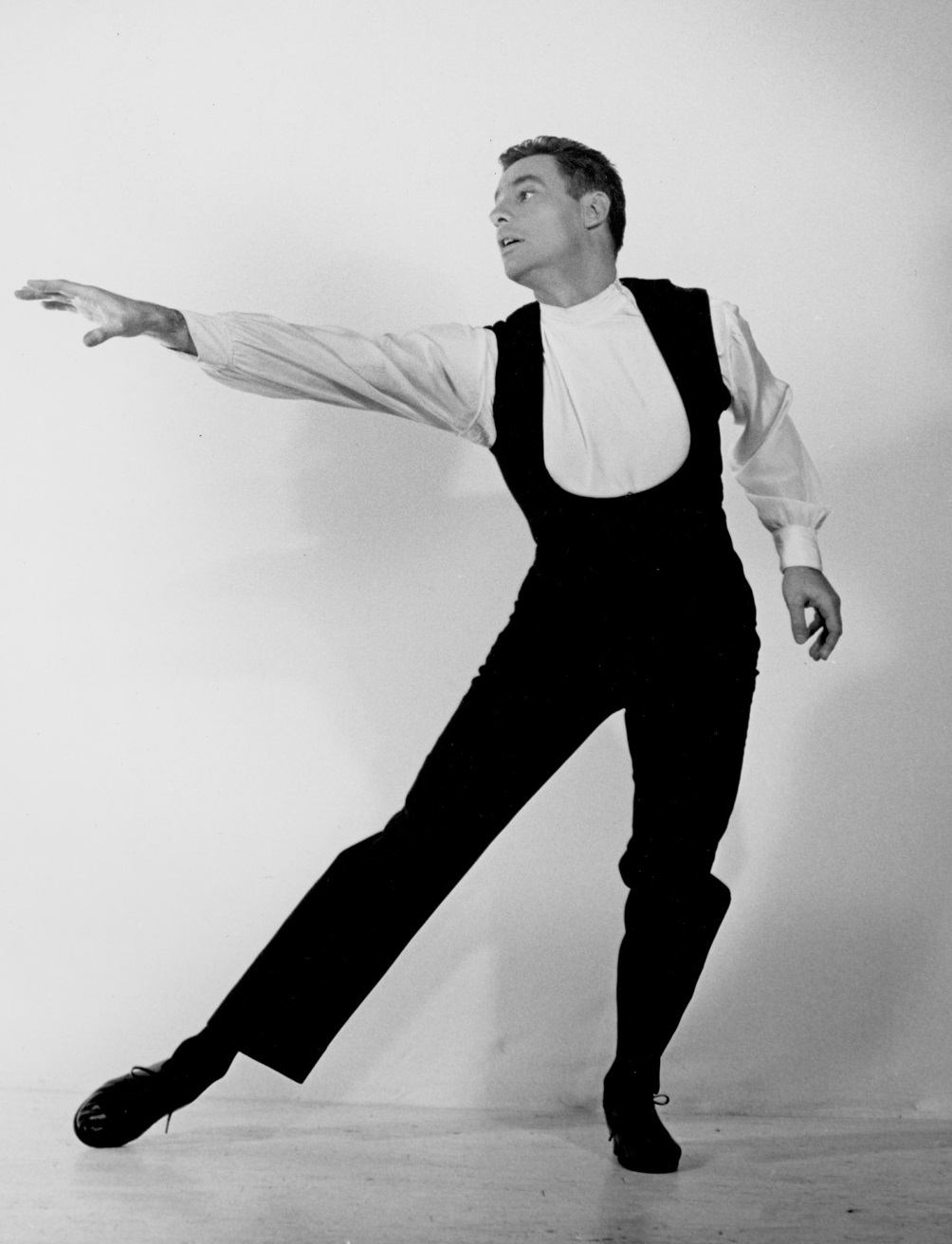
Founder Rodney Strong as a dancer

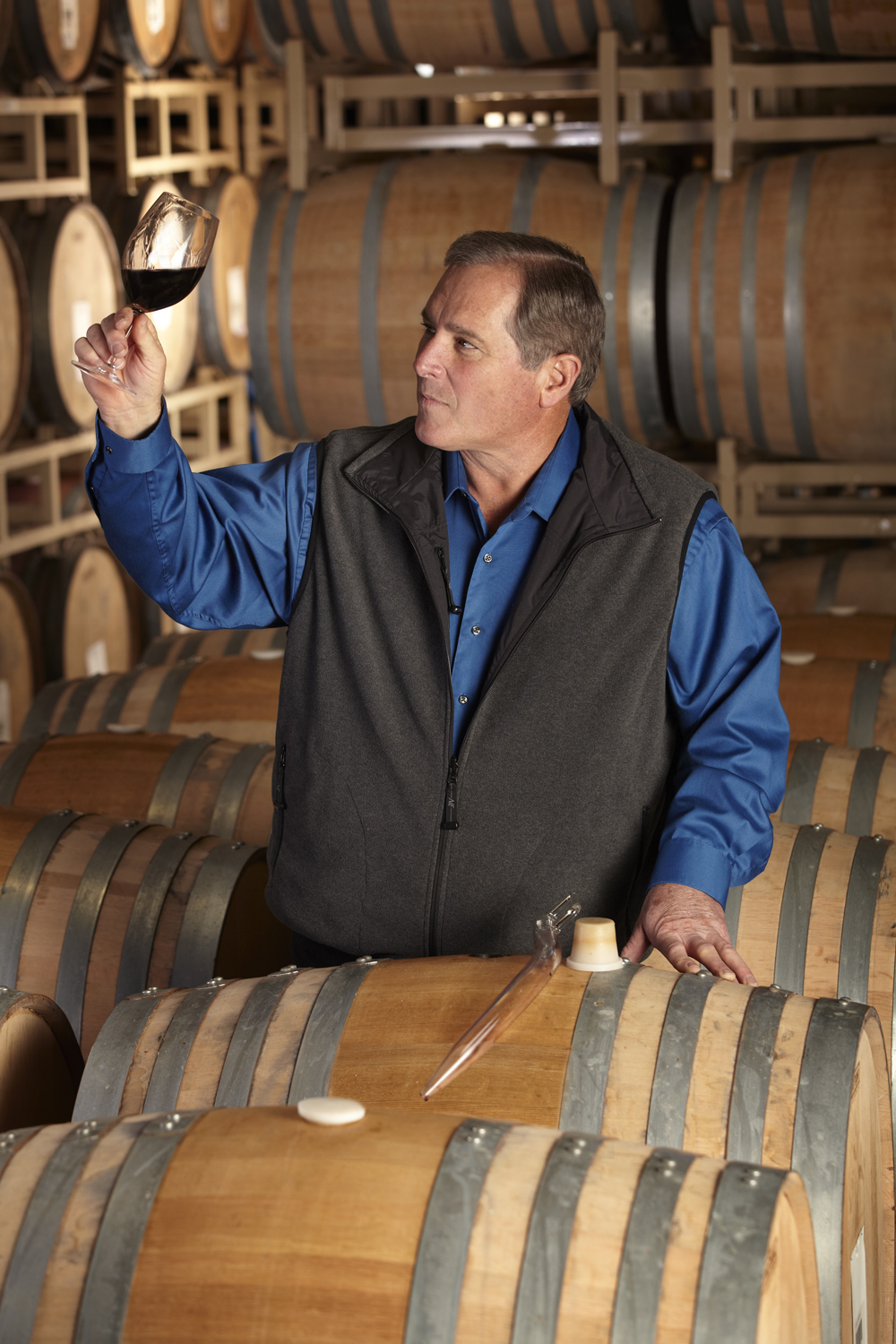
Sr. Vice President of Winemaking Rick Sayre

Rodney Strong was a professional dancer turned Sonoma County vintner. He was one of the first to plant extensive vineyards in prime Sonoma locations including Chalk Hill, Russian River Valley and Alexander Valley.

In 1959, Rodney Strong and his wife Charlotte Ann Winson, moved to Northern California where they purchased a century-old boarding house and began making their first wines. It was the thirteenth bonded winery in Sonoma County.

In 1962, Rodney Strong purchased a turn-of-the-century winery and vineyard in Windsor, Sonoma County with 159 acres of “mixed” grapes. In 1965 he replanted his vineyard to Chardonnay vines - the first Chardonnay planted in what would later become the Chalk Hill AVA.

In 1968, Rodney Strong was the first to plant Pinot Noir in Russian River Valley. In those days, Sonoma County was known for dairies and fruit orchards with few vineyards. Using the latest climate data from UC Davis, he purchased his River East Vineyard and planted Pinot Noir.

In 1974, Rodney Strong released the first Alexander Valley single vineyard Cabernet Sauvignon. He was one of the first to recognize the potential of Alexander Valley. The wine came from his Alexander’s Crown vineyard located near Jimtown. Alexander Valley became an AVA 10 years later.

In 1977, Rodney Strong released the first “Chalk Hill” labeled Chardonnay, introducing the world to Chardonnay from Chalk Hill. Chalk Hill became an AVA five years later.

In 1979, Rick Sayre joined the Rodney Strong winemaking team, growing it into the award-winning program is it today.

In 1989, The Klein Family purchased Rodney Strong Vineyards. Over the next decade, the Klein family funded the purchase of fermentation tanks, state-of-the-art Bucher presses, a steady infusion of new oak barrels, an on-site case goods warehouse, custom barrel servicing equipment, a new crush pad and scale house, a conveyance system to perform whole-cluster pressing on white grapes, and a 100,000 square-foot, temperature-controlled barrel storage building.

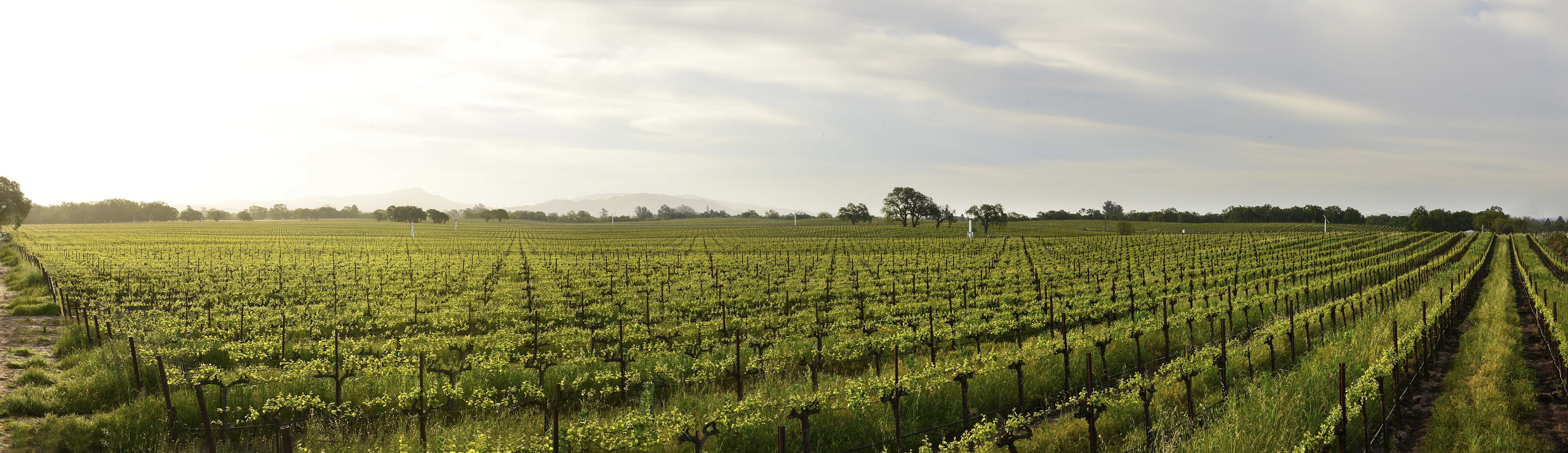
Vineyard at Russian River Valley AVA

In January 2020, Rodney Strong Vineyards made headlines when it was reported that thousands of gallons of cabernet sauvignon spilled into California's Russian River. The spill was estimated to be one of the largest in the county's history.

== Sustainability ==
Rodney Strong Vineyards sustainably farms their 14 estate vineyards. They are certified sustainable by the California Sustainable Winegrowing Alliance and were the first carbon neutral winery in Sonoma County.

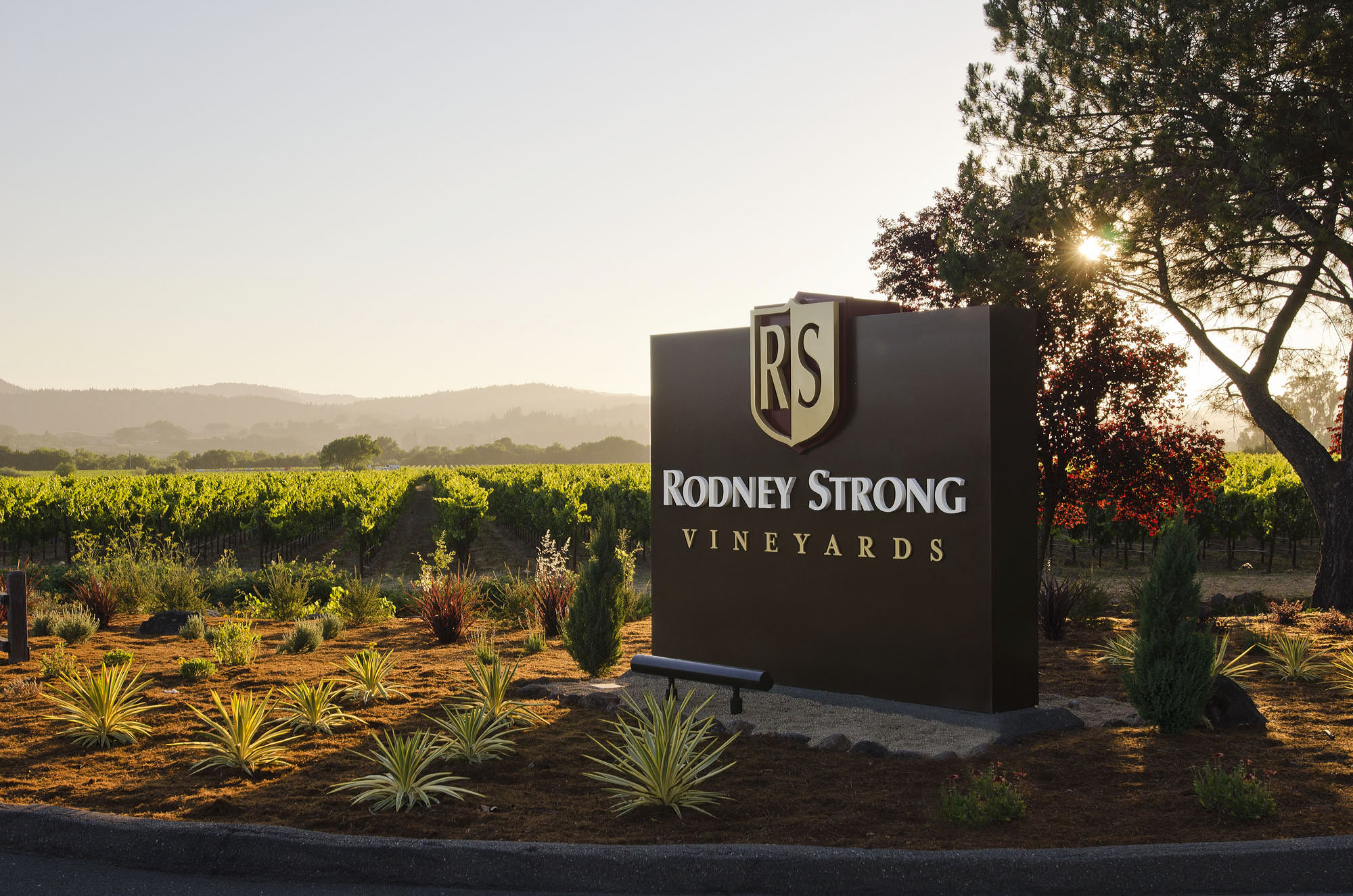
Front entrance of the winery

Their sustainable practices include solar panels which were installed in 2003 on the roof of the barrel room. At the time this was the largest winery solar array in the world. They use soil management techniques to conserve the land including: proper runoff management, erosion prevention, reducing soil compaction, composting grape pumice to return to the soils as organic matter, minimal tillage and the intelligent use of cover crops. Vineyard water management is extremely important and includes using drip irrigation to reduce water use, along with tools, technologies and strategies to monitor water in soils and vines. Rodney Strong Vineyards are Fish Friendly Farming (FFF) certified to restore fish and wildlife habitats and improve water quality. They protect air quality by using natural cover crops, completely eliminating the burning of winter prunings and the use of environmentally safe wetting agents for vineyard roads.

== Collaborations ==
In December 2016, Rodney Strong Vineyards announced in partnership with Wine Business Institute at Sonoma State University the Rodney Strong Pathways Program, designed to bring a broad range of students to Sonoma State University and provide them with a better educational experience and support to guarantee academic and life success. The winery is a sponsor of the Luther Burbank Center for the Arts supporting performances and education programs for children and adults throughout Sonoma County. They are also sponsor of Children of Restaurant Employees (CORE). CORE supports the children of food and beverage employees with life-altering conditions and circumstances. They are also involved in a variety of other philanthropic organizations throughout Sonoma County including The Ortiz Plaza project for affordable housing for agricultural workers and their families.
