= Ametadoria misella =

Scientific classification
- Kingdom: Animalia
- Phylum: Arthropoda
- Class: Insecta
- Order: Diptera
- Family: Tachinidae
- Subfamily: Exoristinae
- Tribe: Eryciini
- Genus: Ametadoria
- Species: A. misella

Binomial name
- Ametadoria misella (Wulp, 1890)

Synonyms
- Anisia misella Wulp, 1890

Species of fly

Ametadoria misella is a species of bristle fly in the family Tachinidae.

== Distribution ==
Mexico
