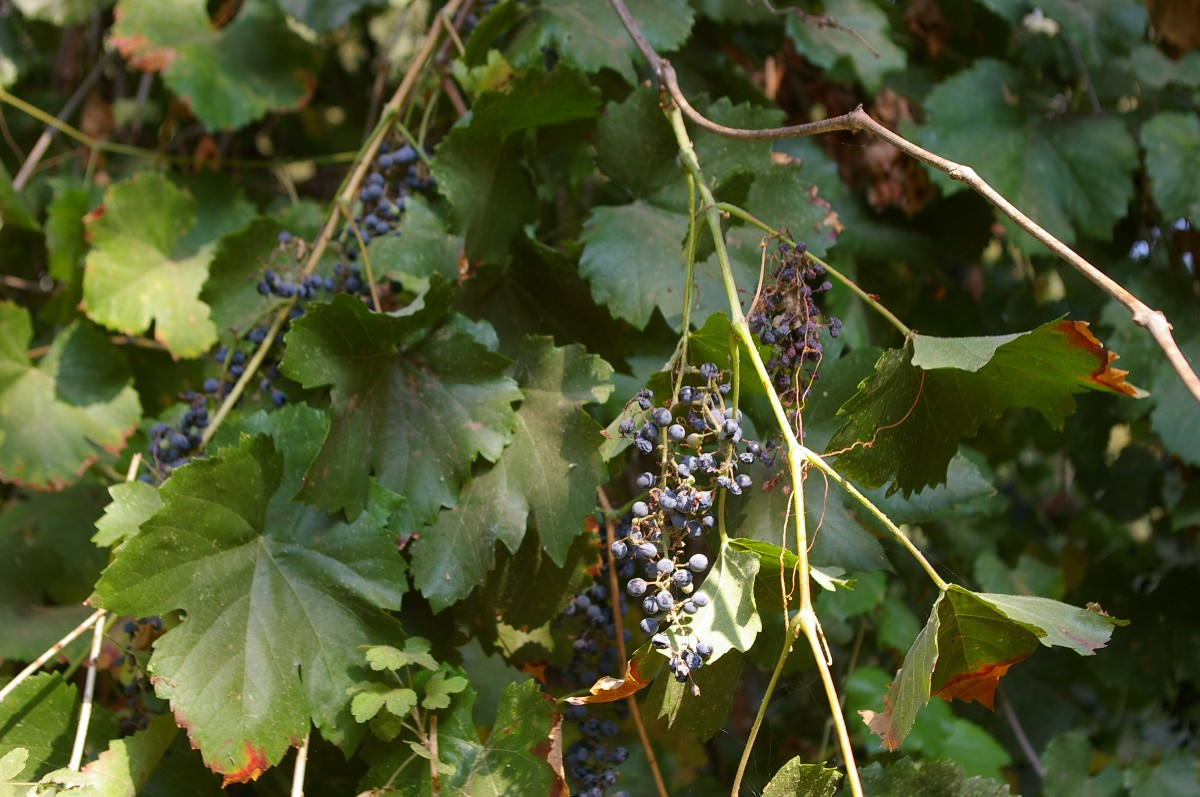

Conservation status
- Apparently Secure (NatureServe)

Scientific classification
- Kingdom: Plantae
- Clade: Embryophytes
- Clade: Tracheophytes
- Clade: Angiosperms
- Clade: Eudicots
- Clade: Rosids
- Order: Vitales
- Family: Vitaceae
- Genus: Vitis
- Species: V. californica

Binomial name
- Vitis californica Benth.

= Vitis californica =

Northern California grape, Pacific grape

Vitis californica, with common names California wild grape, Northern California grape, and Pacific grape, is a wild grape species native to western North America.

== Description ==
Vitis californica is a deciduous vine. It is fast growing and can grow to over 10 metres (33 ft) in length. It climbs on other plants or covers the ground with twisted, woody ropes of vine covered in green leaves. It typically flowers in May and June. In autumn, the leaves turn orange and yellow before falling.

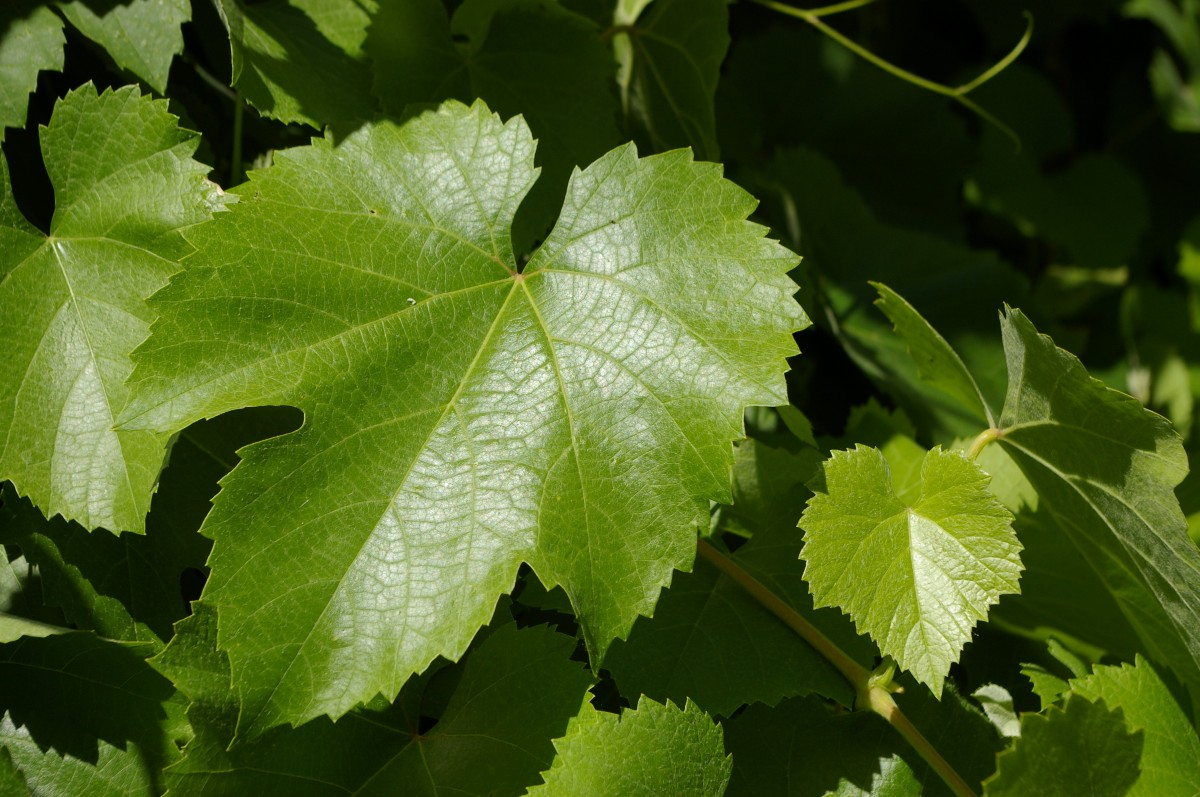
New leaves in a riparian woodland in the San Joaquin Valley

== Distribution and habitat ==
The species is widespread across much of California as well as southwestern Oregon. It is distributed along the Coast Ranges from Douglas County, Oregon, south to San Luis Obispo County, California; in the Klamath Mountains, the Cascade Range, and the Sierra Nevada from Siskiyou to Kern counties, California; and in the Central Valley. The grapes are a common sight along the banks of the Sacramento River.

The plant grows in canyons, alongside springs, and streams. It tends to thrive in damp conditions and so it is common in riparian areas. It can be found on slopes as well as flat ground in wetland and forested habitats. Once matured like most other native California plants it can withstand periods of dry conditions.

== Cultivation ==
=== Viticulture ===
The wild grape is strong and robust, and viticulturists worldwide often use it as rootstock for their wine grapes. It prefers heavier soils. In some areas where the plant is not native it has the capacity to become a noxious weed. However, its invasive nature can be kept under control and is very easy to pull out.

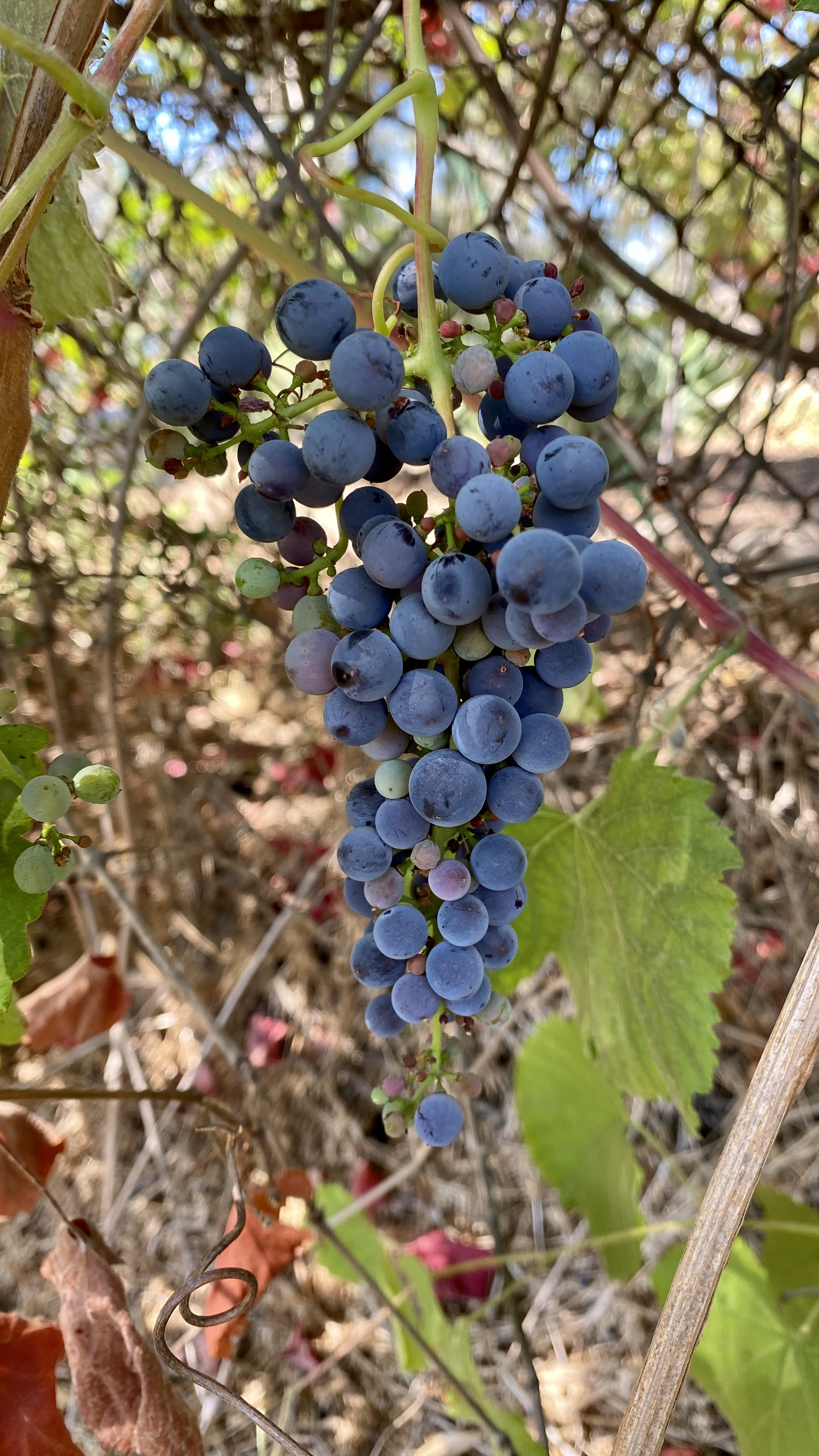
Roger's Red, ripe

=== Horticulture ===
Vitis californica is cultivated as an ornamental plant. The interesting shape and color of the leaves and the lush, trainable vines make this species an attractive garden plant. This vine is commonly used in native plant gardens, where once established it thrives without summer water.

The cultivar 'Roger's Red' (named for noted horticulturist Roger Raiche) turns brilliant red in fall. It is a hybrid with a wine grape, × Vitis vinifera cv. Alicante Bouschet. The cultivar 'Walker Ridge' turns yellow in the autumn.

== Uses ==
Bunches of small and often sour but edible purple grapes hang from the vines in autumn, which can be made into wine or jelly. The grapes provide an important food source for a variety of wild animals, especially birds, and the foliage provides thick cover.
