= Benmore Valley AVA =

Wine growing region in Lake County, California

Coordinates: 38.9982°N 122.9890°W

Benmore Valley
- Wine region
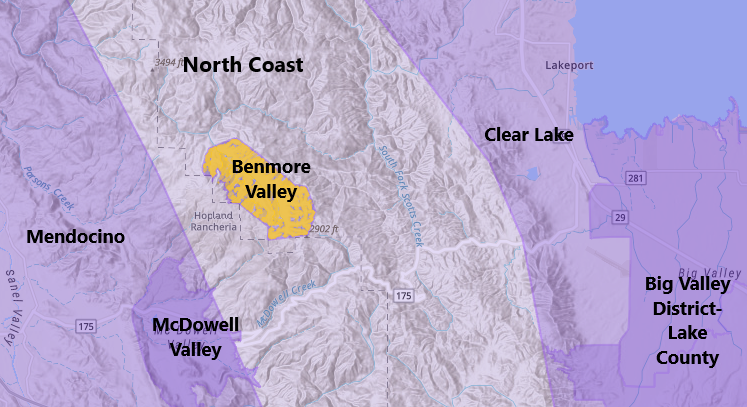
- Type: American Viticultural Area
- Year established: 1991
- Country: United States
- Part of: California, North Coast AVA, Lake County
- Other regions in California, North Coast AVA, Lake County: Big Valley District-Lake County AVA, Clear Lake AVA, Guenoc Valley AVA, High Valley AVA, Kelsey Bench-Lake County AVA, Long Valley-Lake County AVA, Red Hills Lake County AVA, Upper Lake Valley AVA
- Total area: 1,440 acres (2 sq mi)
- No. of vineyards: 0
- Comments: de facto defunct

Benmore Valley is an American Viticultural Area (AVA) located in southwestern Lake County, California. It was established as the nation's 112^{th}, the state's 65^{th} and the county’s fourth appellation on October 19, 1991 by the Bureau of Alcohol, Tobacco and Firearms (ATF), Treasury after reviewing the petition submitted by Sara Schorske of Compliance Specialists, Santa Rosa, California, on behalf of Vimark, Inc., a vineyard owner, proposing the viticultural area in southwest Lake County to be known as "Benmore Valley."
The valley is named for Benjamin Logan Moore, or Ben Moore, a local 19th century cattle rustler. Ben Moore would steal cattle in adjacent Mendocino County and then drive them to Lake County into the hidden valley which now bears his name. He would later drive the cattle into Sacramento Valley where he would sell them.
Benmore Valley is a high depression in the mountains at 2,400 feet (730 m) in elevation prominently identified on U.S.G.S. maps, and is much cooler than surrounding areas. At the outset, the viticultural area encompassed about 1,440 acres (2 sq mi) of which 125 acres (51 ha) were cultivating Chardonnay grapes. There were no bonded wineries in the area. Most of the grapes last produced there were used by Geyser Peak Winery.

As of February 2018, no wineries or planted vineyards were active in the AVA, therefore, no longer highlighted by Lake County Winegrowers Association. The crop is now cannabis planted on the same location of the defunct vineyard. The plant hardiness zone is 9b.
