= Long Valley-Lake County AVA =

American Viticultural Area in Lake County, California

Coordinates: 39°01′56″N 122°34′13″W

Long Valley-Lake County
- Wine region
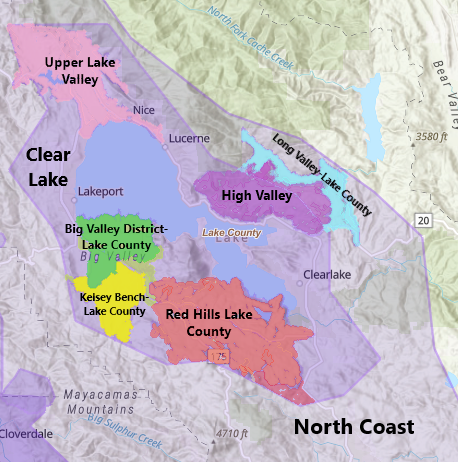
- Type: American Viticultural Area
- Year established: 2023
- Years of wine industry: 143
- Country: United States
- Part of: California, North Coast AVA, Lake County
- Other regions in California, North Coast AVA, Lake County: Guenoc Valley AVA, Clear Lake AVA, Benmore Valley AVA, High Valley AVA, Big Valley District-Lake County AVA, Kelsey Bench-Lake County AVA, Red Hills Lake County AVA, Upper Lake Valley AVA
- Climate region: Region III
- Heat units: 3,378 GDD units
- Precipitation (annual average): 27–33 inches (686–838 mm)
- Soil conditions: tuffaceous, diatomaceous sands and silts, limestone, gravel, intercalated volcanic rocks
- Total area: 7,605 acres (12 sq mi)
- Size of planted vineyards: 150 acres (61 ha)
- No. of vineyards: 5
- Varietals produced: Chardonnay, Pinot noir, Sauvignon Blanc
- No. of wineries: 3

Long Valley-Lake County is an American Viticultural Area (AVA) located in eastern Lake County, California elevated above the eastern shores of Clear Lake. The appellation was established as the nation's 268th, the state's 148th and the county's tenth AVA on July 5, 2023, by the Alcohol and Tobacco Tax and Trade Bureau (TTB), Treasury after reviewing the petition submitted by Terry Dereniuk, owner of Terry Dereniuk Consulting, Don Van Pelt of Cache Creek Vineyards and Clay Shannon of Shannon Family of Wines, on behalf of Long Valley wine grape growers, proposing the viticultural area named “Long Valley-Lake County."

Additionally, TTB expanded the boundary of the established 14,000-acre (22 sq mi) High Valley viticultural area by approximately 1,542 acres (2 sq mi) in order to create a contiguous border with the Long Valley–Lake County viticultural area and, therefore, modified the boundary of the North Coast viticultural area to eliminate a partial overlap with the 7,605-acre (12 sq mi) Long Valley–Lake County viticultural area. At the outset, the Long Valley contained 3 wineries and 5 commercial vineyards, which cultivated approximately 149 acres (60 ha). The plant hardiness zone ranges from 8b to 9b.

== History ==
Long Valley was the ancestral home of Lake County's native people for at least 20,000 years according to history of the area gathered by local historian Dr. John Parker. White settlers arrived in the Valley starting in mid-1800. The name Long Valley has been recognized for this geographical area in Lake County since the late 1800s. Numerous references to Long Valley including references to early settlers as well as voting records and distance information can be found in the History of Napa and Lake Counties published in 1881.

James and Hiram Kennedy purchased the property that is still known today as Kennedy Ranch in 1859. Hiram and his family had a dairy operation on the property for more than 25 years and later switched to raising beef and pork. The Kennedy family dairy produced butter and dairy products served at Bartlett Springs Resort in Lake County. John Gamer came to Long Valley in 1883. Eventually controlling 2,700 acres (1,093 ha), Garner established Garner Stock Farm. Garner Ranch, a working cattle and hay ranch, is now known as Eleven Roses Ranch is still in the Garner family.

The first record of vineyards in Long Valley was a family vineyard planted on land near the southern end of the Valley by John Bonham in 1883. This was followed by in 1885 when N.E. Hanson planted a vineyard with 2,000 vines on his ranch called "The Crags" Modern viticulture in the area, started by David James, with the planting of a block of vines with cuttings from the Fay vineyard that won the 1976 "Judgement of Paris." James and his wife moved to Lake County in 1978 and purchased Pomo Ranch that is located on the western shelf along the southern end of Long Valley. The vines were planted on their own rootstock and are still in production. Today this property is the location of Stonehouse Cellars, a licensed Lake County wine producer (Et Al Wines, Inc).

In 1985, Don Fiora planted the first winegrapes on his property, just up the road from Stonehouse Cellars. This was followed by vines at Noggle Vineyards nearby. Today, this growing area has about 149 acres (60 ha) planted to vines and three bonded wineries. The area is known for producing high quality red winegrapes including Cabernet Sauvignon, Cabernet Franc, Petite Sirah, and Syrah.

== Terroir ==
=== Topography ===
Long Valley AVA includes the valley floor and hillsides rising along the edges of the Valley. Long Valley Creek runs along the valley floor. Wolf Creek flows south along the west side in the area known as Spring Valley. Both creeks merge and empty into the North Fork Cache Creek. The valley floor as well as the bench area along the southwest side are generally flat with slopes from 0% to 10%. Hillsides are much steeper with slopes along some areas more than 30%. In describing the Planning Area Geography, the Shoreline Communities Area Plan characterizes the area with the following, "The narrow valleys were locally filled by lake deposits, volcanic flows, and alluvium. Associated erosion of adjacent ridges has developed an overall rolling foothill and valley topography." The elevation for the proposed area varies. The median elevation of the valley floor is about 1,322 feet (403 m) above sea level with the end of the Valley nearest State Highway 20 as low as 1,063 feet (324 m) above sea level. This is below the level of Clear Lake which is 1,330 feet (405 m) above sea level. This bench area was formerly home to Cache Creek Indian Rancheria. The property was subsequently sold and sub-divided into individual parcels. Today, Noggle Vineyards and Winery and Fiora Vineyards are located on this property.

=== Climate ===
The petition provided information about the climate of the Long Valley-Lake County AVA, including annual rainfall amounts and growing degree day (GDD) accumulations. First, the petition notes that based on data from a California groundwater bulletin, annual rainfall amounts within the AVA generally range between 27 and 33 inches (686 and 838 mm), increasing to the west. The bulletin states that to the southeast of the Long Valley-Lake County AVA, within the Clear Lake Cache Formation Groundwater Basin, annual precipitation amounts range from 25 to 29 inches (635–737 mm). South of the AVA, within the Burns Valley Basin, annual precipitation is approximately 27 inches (686 mm). West and southwest of the AVA, in the High Valley Groundwater Basin, annual precipitation ranges from 27 to 35 inches (686–889 mm), decreasing to the east; however, the petition notes that annual precipitation amounts within the High Valley AVA, which is located within the High Valley Groundwater Basin, can reach up to 54 inches (1,372 mm). To the northwest of the AVA is the Middle Creek Groundwater Basin, and the California groundwater bulletin indicates that annual precipitation amounts in that region range from 43 to 45 inches (1,092–1,143 mm), increasing to the north. Rainfall data was not provided for the regions to the north and east of the AVA.
The petition also includes measurements for rainfall amounts from three specific vineyard locations within the AVA. Noggle Vineyards is located on a bench west of the southern end of the Long Valley floor. Garner Ranch is located in the western portion of the valley floor, which typically receives higher rainfall amounts than the eastern portion of the valley. Garner Ranch is also located at elevations lower than Noggle Vineyards and higher than Spring Valley. The Spring Valley location is on the southeastern side of the valley floor, at elevations lower than both of the other two locations.

Winds blowing through the valley during the growing season cool the vines from the day's heat. Cool air drainage provides protection from damaging late spring frosts in vineyards in the foothills, while vineyards along the valley floor require overhead sprinklers.

=== Geology ===
According to the petition, geology is a significant distinguishing feature of the proposed Long Valley-Lake County AVA. The proposed AVA sits on what is known as the Cache Formation, which is estimated to be 1.6 to 2.8 million years old and from the Pliocene and early Pleistocene period. The formation is largely made up of lake deposits and consists of tuffaceous and diatomaceous sands and silts, limestone, gravel, and intercalated volcanic rocks. The Cache Formation is the foundation for the soils of the AVA and the nutrients found therein, meaning that the roots of vines grown in the Cache Formation will come into contact with a different set of minerals and nutrients than vines grown elsewhere. To the north and west of the Long Valley-Lake County AVA, the primary geologic formation is the Franciscan Formation. This formation is composed of Cretaceous and Jurassic sandstone with similar amounts of shale, chert, limestone, and conglomerate rocks from the Mesozoic period. To the east and south of the AVA is the Great Valley Sequence. Holocene volcanic flow rocks and minor pyroclastic deposits, as well as the Franciscan Formation and ultramafic rocks, also occur to the south and east of the AVA.

=== Soils ===
The Lake County Soil Survey describes the Cache Formation, "The Cache Formation is a sequence of transported freshwater sediments that were subsequently uplifted and dissected to form the hills east of Clearlake Highlands." Soils of the general soil map unit Still-Lupoyoma, including soil map units 158, (Lupoyoma silt loam protected), 246, (Wolf Creek gravelly loam), and 247, (Wolf Creek loam) are the most prevalent soil series on the western half of the valley floor of the proposed area. These soils are described in the Lake County Soil Survey as very deep, moderately well to well-drained soil formed in alluvium from mixed rock sources. These soils are level with slopes of 0% to 2% and are included in the list of soil map units that are noted as prime farmland when irrigated. Xerofluvents very gravelly or Xerofluvents - Riverwash complex are found along the creek beds of Long Valley Creek, Wolf Creek, and North Fork of the Cache Creek. These soils are typically not suitable for viticulture. Pockets of Maywood variant sandy loam is also found on the southern end of the Valley floor. This soil map unit is included in the list of soils that comprise prime farmland. All of these soils are part of the Talmage-Xerofluvents-Riverwash general soil unit, and found along stream beds. There are also pockets of Manzanita gravelly loam, found along the Valley floor closer to Highway 20. Cache Creek Vineyards which sits on a bench on the south-eastern side of Long Valley, has mostly Phipps Complex soil. Slopes in this map unit are steeper, ranging from 5% to 15%. All of these soil units have a common theme in that they were formed in alluvium from mixed rock sources. This is consistent with the description of the Cache Formation description as "a sequence of transported freshwater sediments."

== Viticulture ==
Long Valley is the eastern most viticulture area in Lake County. It is bordered by State Highway 20 to the south, High Valley AVA to the west and southwest, the Mendocino National Forest to the north and west, and steep mountainous terrain on the east. The western third of the proposed Long Valley area currently lies within the larger North Coast AVA. Vineyard development in this area did not start until ten years later than much of the rest of Lake County. The alluvial valley floor, approximately nine miles (14 km) long and one mile (2 km) wide, has elevations of 1,200 to 1,300 feet (366–396 m) above sea level which is below the level of Clear Lake as well as most of the acreage planted to vines in Lake County. Cache Creek Vineyards, which is based at the southern tip of Long Valley, and Shannon Family of Wines, which in 2015 acquired 280 acres in the area, were key petitioners to get the region recognized as an American Viticultural Area. As of May 2024, three wineries operate within the Long Valley boundaries: Noggle Vineyards & Winery, Cache Creek Vineyards, and Stonehouse Cellars.
