= Jed Steele =

California winemaker (1945–2025)

- Born: January 26, 1945; New York, U.S.
- Died: October 31, 2025 (aged 80); Lake County, California, U.S.
- Education: Gonzaga University, UC Davis
- Occupation: Winemaker
- Years active: 1968–2020

Jedediah Tecumseh Steele (January 1, 1945 – October 31, 2025), known as Jed Steele, was a California winemaker. He was Kendall-Jackson's winemaker from 1982 until 1990. He subsequently started Steele Wines, and is considered a pioneer and advocate for California wine in general and Lake County in particular.

== Early life ==
Born in New York, Jed, the youngest of five siblings, moved with his parents to San Francisco in 1950 where he grew up. His father Robert was a published historian and newspaperman. Jed's middle name Tecumseh was his father's homage to the Shawnee chief, whom he admired and wrote about.

In 1961, Jed obtained a basketball scholarship to Gonzaga University in Spokane, Washington, and graduated in 1967 with a degree in psychology.

== Career ==
In 1968, he interned for a few months in the cellar of Stony Hill Vineyard in Napa Valley, owned by Fred and Eleanor McCrea, who were friends of his parents, living with writer M. F. K. Fisher. Steele went on to earn a MS in enology at UC Davis in 1974. He then joined Edmeades Winery in Anderson Valley, where he eventually led viticulture and winemaking operations for eight years.

=== Kendall-Jackson ===
Fetzer winemaker Paul Dolan urged Steele to meet attorney Jess Jackson, who owned vineyards in the Lakeport area of Lake County, California, and wanted to start his own winery (Jackson had produced wine himself for a few vintages under the Chateau du Lac label, but largely as a hobby).

Steele was hired as winemaker for Kendall-Jackson (K-J) in 1982. The first Chardonnay vintage, assembled from grapes from Lake County, but also Sonoma, Monterey and Santa Barbara counties, became stuck in fermentation. The resulting somewhat off-dry wine was bottled, and became an instant sensation. After bottles were sent by a Sacramento wine buyer to the Reagan White House in 1984, it became the First Lady's favorite, and the K-J Chardonnay was soon nicknamed "Nancy's wine" by San Francisco Chronicle's columnist Herb Caen. By the end of the decade, K-J was producing 550,000 cases of its Vintner's Reserve Chardonnay.

While the Chardonnay remained the "bread-and-butter wine" for K-J, its Vintner's Reserve affordably priced in 1986 at US$7 (equivalent to $20.56 in 2025), Steele also made Sauvignon blanc, Riesling, Cabernet Sauvignon and Zinfandel wines, and eventually expanded to Merlot and Muscat canelli as well. During Steele's tenure, Kendall-Jackson's annual case production soared from 35,000 in 1982 to more than 700,000 in 1991.

In August 1990, Steele was promoted to director of winemaking at Kendall-Jackson as Tom Selfridge was hired as a winemaking consultant. Frustrated by the corporate nature his job had taken, he decided to leave. In what was described as an amicable split, Jackson agreed on a severance of US$400,000 (equivalent to $985,736 in 2025), plus $10,000 a month while Steele trained his successor.

In May 1991, Jackson fired Steele, accusing him of stealing "trade secrets". The winemaker sued his former employer for the remnant of his $275,000 severance package, and Jackson countersued. The trial, held in Lake County Superior Court in May 1992, resulted in a partial win for Jackson, as Judge John Golden ruled that a winemaking process or formula do constitute a trade secret. The controversial ruling was largely decried in the wine industry. In June 1993, Steele dropped the appeal he had planned to file.

=== Steele Wines ===
In 1991, Steele started his own eponymous label, first producing in a Lower Lake facility in Lake County. He began a 17-year consulting relationship with Chateau Ste. Michelle in Woodinville, Washington, and also consulted for Fess Parker Winery in Los Olivos, in Santa Barbara County as well as other wineries.

A firm believer in single-vineyard wines, Steele released no fewer than eight different Chardonnays from single sites for his 1994 vintage, including from such reputed vineyards as Bien Nacido, Durell and Sangiacomo, respectively in the Santa Maria Valley, Sonoma Valley and Carneros AVAs (he continued producing several different Chardonnay wines under his different labels in subsequent years, including from some of those original vineyards). Steele's newly found independence also allowed him to experiment with new varieties, such as Pinot noir, which he first made for the 1991 vintage.

In 1996, Steele acquired the former Konocti Winery in Lakeport, along State Highway 29, allowing him to consolidate production, which until then was spread out across different facilities. At the time, Steele planned to cut production and hover around 15,000 cases a year.

Besides his flagship Steele Wines label, Steele soon established other brands: Shooting Star, Stymie and Writer's Block, each corresponding to a different style and price point. Shooting Star (a translation for "Tecumseh") was the second, affordable label, usually stainless-fermented and accessible wines meant to be drunk young. Writer's Block was developed with Jed's son Quincy. The Stymie line, the reserve wines, took its name from the horse his father supposedly bet on and ended up winning big, funding the family's move from New York City to San Francisco.

Steele was producing at some point nearly 40 different wines each vintage. The winery owned five estate vineyards in Lake County, totally 81 acres, but worked with dozens of different California vineyards in Mendocino, Sonoma and even Santa Barbara counties, and grapes coming as far as Washington state. Lake County remained however Steele's focus, showcasing grapes from various varieties ranging from the usual suspects (Cabernet Sauvignon, Chardonnay, Sauvignon blanc, Zinfandel, Merlot) to Carignan, Barbera, Cabernet Franc or Tempranillo.

By 2018, Steele Wines' annual output was about 65,000 cases of wine, not including its custom crush facility production.

After suffering a stroke, Jed Steele sold his winery and brand to Shannon Family of Wines in August 2020. The acquiring company, headed by Clay Shannon, had been using Steele Wines as one of its custom crush facilities for years. The sale was characterized as "a very friendly deal" by Shannon. The new owner originally phased out Steele's brands (except Shooting Star) from its portfolio, but relaunched the Steele Wines label in 2025. The former Steele winery site is now the headquarters for Shannon Family of Wines, which has expanded it with The Mercantile, a tasting room and event venue.

== Winemaking style and legacy ==
The inaugural Chardonnay vintage Jed Steele bottled for Kendall-Jackson was a game-changer in the American wine market, where the best-selling and most planted white variety until then was Sauvignon blanc. California Chardonnay, which had already seen a rising popularity following the Paris Wine Tasting of 1976 and the advocacy of personalities like winemaker David Ramey or wine writer Frank Prial, quickly overtook and by the early 1990s, it had become the most popular white wine in the U.S. In 2005, Kendall-Jackson's Vintner's Reserve Chardonnay was the most frequently ordered wine on American restaurant lists. According to Wine Spectator, it was "the most popular Chardonnay sold in America from 1992 to 2022 by value".

Jed Steele's wines have been described as "bold", and he prized consumer tastes, and insisted on making affordable wines expressing the personality of the vineyard they stemmed from. He enjoyed making wines from lesser known varieties, such as Aligoté or Blaufränkisch, both of which he used Washington grapes for, and produced Black Bubbles, an Australian-style sparkling Syrah, as well as port-style wines from estate grapes.

Napa Valley's winegrower Andy Beckstoffer credits Jed Steele with showing him the viticultural potential of Lake County, in particular its Red Hills region. Beckstoffer ended up acquiring hundreds of acres through multiple transactions, becoming himself an advocate for Cabernet Sauvignon grown in the rich volcanic soil characterizing the appellation.

== Personal life ==
Jed Steele married Ann Stenerson in July 1973 in Spokane, Washington, with whom he had two children, Quincy and Mendocino. He later married Marie Beery, at the time Kendall-Jackson's bookkeeper, with whom he moved to Lake County. They divorced in the early 1990s. In his later years, Jed Steele shared his time between his homes in Kelseyville, Jacksonville and Montana with his partner Paula Doran.

He died of bladder cancer on October 31, 2025.
