= Lake County wine =

Appellation designating wine from Lake County, California

Coordinates: 39°01′44″N 122°48′41″W

Lake County
- Wine region
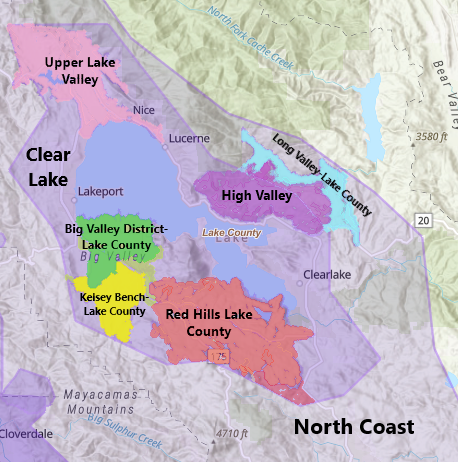
- Type: U.S. County Appellation
- Year established: 1861
- Years of wine industry: 156
- Country: United States
- Part of: California, North Coast AVA
- Other regions in California, North Coast AVA: Napa County, Sonoma County, Mendocino County
- Sub-regions: Benmore Valley AVA, Big Valley District-Lake County AVA, Clear Lake AVA, Guenoc Valley AVA, High Valley AVA, Kelsey Bench-Lake County AVA, Long Valley-Lake County AVA, Red Hills Lake County AVA, Upper Lake Valley AVA
- Precipitation (annual average): 20–80 inches (508–2,032 mm)
- Soil conditions: Volcanic origin, gravel, sand, tephra and obsidian
- Total area: 1,257 square miles (804,480 acres)
- Size of planted vineyards: 10,516 acres (4,256 ha)
- Grapes produced: Cabernet Franc, Cabernet Sauvignon, Chardonnay, Malbec, Merlot, Muscat blanc, Petit Verdot, Petite Sirah, Pinot gris, Pinot noir, Sauvignon blanc, Sémillon, Syrah, Tempranillo, Viognier, Zinfandel

Lake County wine designates wine made from grapes grown mostly in Lake County, California. The region is located northeast of Napa and Sonoma Counties, and east of Mendocino County. Although each region within Lake County has unique viticultural attributes, they are all influenced by Clear Lake, the largest inland body of water in California.

Lake County has 10,516 acres (4,256 ha) of cultivated vineyards at elevations ranging from 1,370 feet (420 m) (Clear Lake's level) to 2,640 feet (800 m), and is known for red wines made from Cabernet Sauvignon, Syrah and Zinfandel, and for white wines made from Sauvignon blanc.

== History ==
Although the local Pomo were familiar with Vitis californica vines, the first winegrape vineyards in the area were planted by European American settlers in the 1870s (although it is claimed the first vines were planted in 1854 at Lillie Langtry's Guenoc estate), and in 1884 totaled about 600 acres (243 ha). One of the county's earliest viticulturists was a Frenchman, "Professor" William Claudius Mottier, who near Harbin Springs experimented in the early 1870s with grafting European varieties on californica rootstocks, notably "Carbonet Malbec" (probably Carménère) and Mourvèdre. Mottier's wine is said to have earned Arpad Haraszthy's praise. Another early viticulturist was Serranus Clinton Hastings, who reportedly farmed 125 acres (51 ha) of vineyards (including 60 acres of Zinfandel) in the Upper Lake area and had a 150,000 U.S. gallons (570,000 L) capacity winery and distillery in 1886. He and his brothers eventually acquired more acreage in the region, but the winery ceased operation in 1900.

Varieties reported planted in the 1880s included Zinfandel, Charbono, Riesling, Golden Chasselas, and Burger, grown notably in a 300-acre vineyard planted by the California Agricultural and Improvement Association in the Lower Lake area. In 1907, Lake County reported 7 wineries and a production of 34,500 gallons.

When Prohibition was enacted, over thirty wineries existed in the county, and the law dealt a serious blow to Lake County's viticulture industry. Wineries closed, and most vineyards were uprooted and replaced with walnut and pear orchards, which have remained significant, although secondary, crops in the region. Some vineyards were replanted after the 1933 Repeal. A 1953 county agricultural report lists 150 acres (61 ha) of grapes (yielding 175 tons), while walnuts account for 4,788 acres (1,938 ha) and pears for 3,792 acres (1,535 ha). Lake County grapes were sent to neighboring counties for vinification and bottling at operations such as Fetzer Vineyards or Parducci Wine Cellars in Mendocino County. In 1972, a phylloxera control ordinance was passed to address the ongoing pest problem affecting many North Coast vineyards. The decade saw a rapid increase in vineyard plantings, with 532 acres of bearing grapevines in 1974, 1,237 acres the following year, and 2,680 by 1979.

It was only in 1977 that Lower Lake Winery, the first to open in the county since Prohibition, held its first crush. In 1979, Albert Moorhead built Konocti Winery in Lakeport. By 1980, 2,990 acres of vineyards had been planted in the county, and Lake Wine Producers had been formed to promote the use of local grapes. Lake County Vintners was spun off from that group, a co-op of 34 wine growers that took an interest in Konocti Winery.

The Guenoc Valley, the county's first American Viticultural Area (AVA), was established in 1981, followed in 1984 by Clear Lake AVA. In the early 1980s, Jess Jackson founded Chateau Du Lac in Lakeport, which would become the foundation for the Kendall-Jackson brand. In 1987, the county counted five winery tasting rooms: Stuermer Winery (formerly Lower Lake Winery), Konocti Cellars and Kendall-Jackson in Lakeport, and Guenoc and Channing Rudd Cellars in Middletown. By 1989, Shed Horn Cellars, located south of Middletown, had joined the list.

In 1993, after outgrowing its Lakeport location, Kendall-Jackson moved most of its operations to Windsor, in Sonoma County. In 1996, Jed Steele, who had worked for Kendall-Jackson in Lakeport until 1990 and had since started his own label and consulted for Wildhurst Vineyards in Kelseyville, purchased Konocti Winery.

A resurgence of the Lake County wine industry in the late 1990s and 2000s saw the establishment of new wineries, notably Wildhurst Winery, Brassfield Estate Winery, Shannon Ridge, Céago, Gregory Graham Wines, Chacewater Winery, and Six Sigma Ranch and Winery. New AVAs were recognized by the TTB: Napa Valley-based Andy Beckstoffer was instrumental in the creation of the Red Hills AVA in 2004, when he acquired over 1,000 acres (400 ha), and High Valley AVA, where Brassfield Estate and Shannon Ridge already owned acreage, was established the following year.

Wildfires, in particular the 2015 Valley Fire and the 2018 Mendocino Complex Fire, have affected Lake County's wine industry over the years. While the physical damage to vines has been minimal (some were credited as serving as firebreaks), smoke taint affected several vintages. The Mendocino Complex Fire is estimated to have cost the county's growers over $37 million. The Lake County Winegrape Commission has been collaborating with UC Davis, public agencies, laboratories and other wine groups to investigate the effects of wildfire smoke on crops.

Lake County has also been affected by the downturn in the American wine industry, and some vineyards have been removed to reduce planted acreage. In 2025, Beckstoffer Vineyards began removing 800 acres of vines and planned to keep only 140 planted acres.

== Viticulture ==

Since Lake County reemerged as a winegrowing region in the 1960s, most grapes harvested in the area have been transported to neighboring counties for vinification. That share is estimated at 80%, with Napa County the primary destination for Lake County grapes. TTB rules allow up to 15% of grapes from another area to be blended into a wine bearing an appellation such as Napa Valley, and the lower prices for Lake County grapes have made them an attractive blending component for wineries in regions with higher-priced appellations. In 2023, Lake County Cabernet Sauvignon brought on average $2,321 per ton (as opposed to $9,235 for Napa Valley and $3,058 in Sonoma County), and Sauvignon blanc averaged $1,425 per ton (as opposed to $3,160 in Napa Valley and $2,054 in Sonoma County).

Some local grapes are also used in wines labeled North Coast, since Lake County lies within that larger appellation, or California. Wineries based in Napa Valley or Sonoma County that source from the region include Francis Ford Coppola Winery, Trinchero Family Estates, Hagafen Cellars, Arnot-Roberts, Conn Creek and Kendall-Jackson (which still owns vineyards in Lake County). Lake County has about 20 bonded wineries as of May 2024. Several other operations own vineyards in the area and focus on labels primarily bearing Lake County appellations, even if their wine is made in neighboring Napa, Mendocino or Sonoma counties; these include Obsidian Ridge, Fore Family Vineyards, Dancing Crow Vineyards, Wild Diamond Vineyards and Sol Rouge.

Through marketing efforts by the Lake County Winegrape Commission, the Lake County Winery Association and advocates for the region such as the late Jed Steele and Andy Beckstoffer, who invested heavily in the Red Hills appellation, some Lake County AVAs or designations now appear more often on the labels of wineries outside the county. As of April 2024, Lake County had 3,359 acres (1,359 ha) acres planted to white grape varieties and 7,948 acres (3,216 ha) acres planted to red winegrapes, totaling 11,307 acres (4,576 ha).

Lake County's Cabernet Sauvignon was recognized early on for its quality. At 4,834 acres (1,956 ha), the Bordeaux variety is by far the most planted grape in the county, dominating the Red Hills AVA and the rocky soils of the High Valley and Kelsey Bench AVAs; however, over 800 acres of the variety have been removed since 2024. Sauvignon blanc is the second most planted grape, which the county's growers have been capitalizing on. The range in terroirs allows for different expressions of the variety, from the sedimentary soils at 1,300 feet in the Big Valley District to the mountainous volcanic soils of the Red Hills and High Valley.

Petite Sirah is the second most cultivated red variety in the county, followed by Zinfandel, which was among the first varieties planted in the area. Syrah and Bordeaux varieties are also common plantings. At 516 acres, Chardonnay is the second most planted white, followed by Pinot gris. As of 2025, there were reportedly 4 acres of table grape vineyards in Lake County.

Planted vineyard acreage in Lake County is reportedly broken down as follows:

| White winegrape variety | Planted acreage |
|---|---|
| Albariño | 1 |
| Chardonnay | 516 |
| Chenin blanc | 6 |
| Gewürztraminer | 11 |
| Marsanne | 1 |
| Muscat blanc | 74 |
| Pinot gris | 233 |
| Roussanne | 5 |
| Sauvignon blanc | 2,502 |
| Sémillon | 35 |
| Vermentino | 1 |
| Viognier | 36 |
| Riesling | 25 |
| Other white | 6 |

| Red winegrape variety | Planted acreage |
|---|---|
| Aglianico | 1 |
| Alicante Bouschet | 1 |
| Barbera | 18 |
| Cabernet Franc | 117 |
| Cabernet Sauvignon | 4,834 |
| Carignan | 6 |
| Carménère | 1 |
| Cinsault | 5 |
| Dolcetto | 1 |
| Grenache noir | 30 |
| Malbec | 196 |
| Merlot | 289 |
| Mourvèdre | 25 |
| Nebbiolo | 4 |
| Nero d'Avola | 9 |
| Petit Verdot | 100 |
| Petite Sirah | 702 |
| Pinot noir | 91 |
| Primitivo | 6 |
| Sangiovese | 6 |
| Syrah | 205 |
| Tempranillo | 33 |
| Teroldego | 11 |
| Touriga Nacional | 2 |
| Valdiguié | 12 |
| Zinfandel | 338 |
| Other red | 24 |

Vineyard holders in Lake County include Beckstoffer Vineyards, Shannon Family of Wines, Kendall-Jackson, E&J Gallo, Brassfield Estate Winery, Bartolucci Vineyards, Luchsinger Vineyards, Sol Rouge, and Obsidian Wine Company.

== Appellations ==
Nine AVAs have been designated by the Treasury Department in Lake County as of 2025. The initial appellation, Guenoc Valley, established in 1981, still has a single winery. The county's most prominent AVA is Red Hills, which commands higher prices for its Cabernet Sauvignon.

As of April 2025, two additional proposed appellations encompassing Lake County acreage were pending with the TTB: Mount St. Helena-Lake County AVA, a 4,000-acre area north of Mount St. Helena, and Collayomi Valley AVA, which encompasses much of the original Rancho Collayomi land grant.

=== Benmore Valley ===
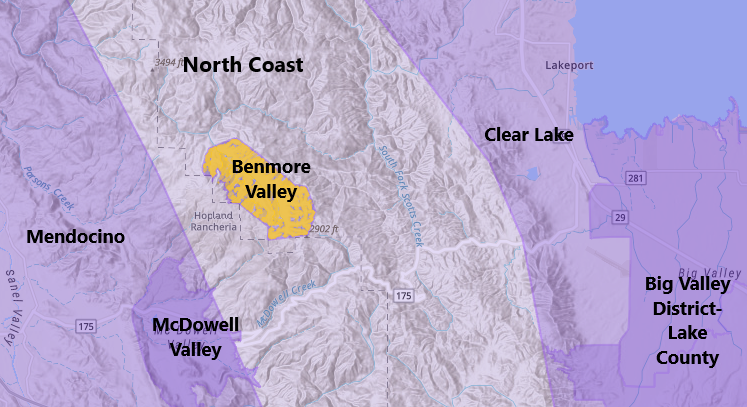

The Benmore Valley AVA was established in 1991. It is a high valley in the mountains of southwestern Lake County. As of February 2018, no wineries or planted vineyards were active in the AVA, making it a de facto defunct appellation that the Lake County Winegrowers Association no longer promotes. The land is now planted with cannabis on the site of the former vineyard.

=== Big Valley District ===
The Big Valley District is located south of the southern shore of Clear Lake and was established as a viticultural area on October 2, 2013. It covers approximately 11,000 acres (17 sq mi), and at the time of its official recognition contained six bonded wineries, 43 vineyards, and roughly 1,800 acres (730 ha) of cultivated vineyards.

=== Clear Lake ===
The second AVA recognized by the TTB in Lake County, Clear Lake AVA encompasses 174,798 acres (273 sq mi) centered around Clear Lake. Elevations range from 1,300 to 3,000 feet (400 to 910 m). The Big Valley District, High Valley, the Kelsey Bench and the Red Hills viticultural areas are nested within the Clear Lake AVA.

=== Guenoc Valley ===
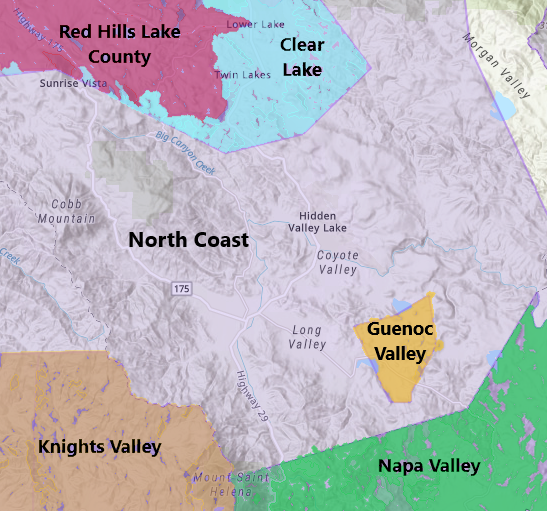

Established in 1981, Guenoc Valley AVA was the first American Viticultural Area designation granted to an area with just a single winery. Located in southern Lake County, Guenoc Valley is a small inland valley comprising an alluvial fan of arroyo and Conejo loam series soils isolated from surrounding areas by rocky ridges.

=== High Valley ===
High Valley AVA is located in the eastern part of the county. The valley lies at elevations ranging from 1,600 to 3,000 feet (490 to 910 m). Red volcanic soils can be found on the hillsides, while alluvial fans and benches on the valley floor provide well-drained beds for the vines.

=== Kelsey Bench ===
Established on October 2, 2013, the Kelsey Bench AVA encompasses about 9,100 acres (14 sq mi), with 900 acres (360 ha) under cultivation, 27 vineyards at the time of its official recognition, and two bonded wineries. The term "bench" was chosen to reflect the area's higher elevations and hills. The boundaries of the Kelsey Bench AVA are the Big Valley District AVA to the north ( established concurrently), the Red Hills AVA to the southeast, and Adobe Creek Drive to Highland Springs Road in Lakeport to the west.

=== Red Hills ===
Part of the Mayacamas Range, the Red Hills Lake County AVA lies along the southwestern shores of Clear Lake, separating Excelsior Valley to the east from Big Valley to the west. The hills lie at the foot of Mount Konocti, a volcano that last erupted 11,000 years ago and is still regarded as active. The terrain consists of rolling hills with elevations between 1,400 feet (430 m) and 3,000 feet (910 m) above sea level. Cabernet Sauvignon dominates the Red Hills, where 3,250 acres (1,320 ha) are under vines.

=== Upper Lake Valley ===
On June 3, 2022, the TTB established Upper Lake Valley AVA. The Upper Lake Valley is the eighth AVA in Lake County, California. The AVA consists of a series of valleys running north-northwesterly from the shores of Clear Lake. These valleys and the surrounding hillsides sit at elevations of 1,330 to 1,480 feet (405 to 451 m) and are slightly cooler than nearby areas.

=== Long Valley ===
On August 4, 2023, the TTB established the Long Valley-Lake County AVA, a transverse valley lying to the north and east of High Valley and covering approximately 7,605 acres (12 sq mi).

== See also ==
- Mendocino County wine
- Napa County wine
- Sonoma County wine
- Wine Country (California)
