= Shannon Family of Wines =

Winery operation in Lake County, California

- Location: Lakeport, California, US
- Coordinates: 38°59′34″N 122°52′29″W
- Appellation: North Coast AVA
- Other labels: Clay Shannon, Ovis, Buck Shack, Steele, Giannecchini, Cricket Farms, High Valley
- Founded: 2001; 24 years ago
- Key people: Clay Shannon (Proprietor); Joy Merrilees (Vice-President of Production)
- Cases/yr: 280,000 (2023)
- Varietals: Cabernet Sauvignon, Sauvignon blanc, Zinfandel, Chardonnay, Petite Sirah, Cabernet Franc, Pinot noir, Cinsault
- Other products: Lamb meat, olive oil
- Distribution: United States, Canada
- Tasting: The Mercantile (Lakeport, California)
- Website: shannonfamilyofwines.com

Shannon Family of Wines is a family-owned and operated vineyard, winery and ranching operation in Lake County, California. It produces wine under various labels, notably Cabernet Sauvignon, Zinfandel, Sauvignon blanc and red blends made from Lake County grapes and neighboring counties in the North Coast AVA. Most of its labels fall under the super-premium, ultra-premium and luxury wine segments.

The operation was founded in 2001 as Shannon Ridge Vineyards & Winery by Clay Shannon (who worked for Sutter Home Winery from 1985 to 1993), and produced wines from Lake County vineyards under the Shannon Ridge and Cross Springs labels. The winery added a new brand when in 2010 it opened its Vigilance Winery & Vineyard tasting room on one of its Red Hills Lake County AVA vineyards in Lower Lake, California.

In 2018, Shannon Ridge Family of Wines purchased Nice Wine Co., located in Nice, California, expanding its winemaking and bottling capacity. In 2020, the company acquired Steele Wines, another Lake County winery, which Shannon had been using as a custom crush facility. Steele Wines had been founded in 1991 by Jed Steele, the original winemaker for Kendall-Jackson. Shannon still produces wines under the Steele brand. That same year, the winery acquired the Giannecchini Vineyard in the Talmage Bench AVA of Mendocino County.

In December 2021, Shannon Family of Wines opened The Mercantile, a wine bar, gourmet food retail and event venue at the original Steele winery location in Lakeport, California.

The company was a key petitioner in the process to get Long Valley, in eastern Lake County, recognized as an American Viticultural Area in April 2023.

The operation's 1,000 acre mountain vineyard in the High Valley AVA is certified organic, making use of its sheep flock for weeding and pest control.
