= Red Hills Lake County AVA =

American Viticultural Area (AVA) in Lake County, California

Coordinates: 38°55′44″N 122°42′18″W

Red Hills Lake County
- Wine region
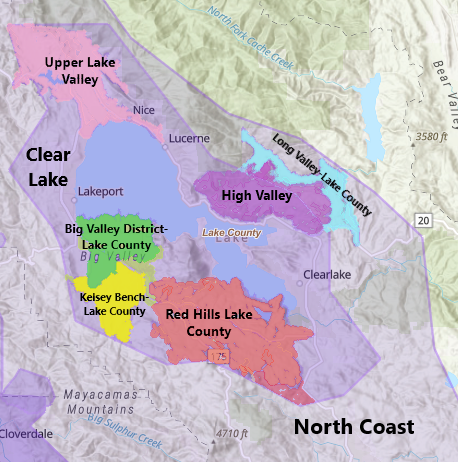
- Type: American Viticultural Area
- Year established: 2004; 2013 Amend; 2024 Amend
- Years of wine industry: 45
- Country: United States
- Part of: California, North Coast AVA, Lake County, Clear Lake AVA
- Other regions in California, North Coast AVA, Lake County, Clear Lake AVA: Big Valley District-Lake County AVA, Guenoc Valley AVA, High Valley AVA, Kelsey Bench-Lake County AVA, Long Valley-Lake County AVA, Upper Lake Valley AVA
- Growing season: 120-185 days
- Climate region: Region III
- Heat units: 3,244 GDD
- Precipitation (annual average): 35 to 65 inches (889–1,651 mm)
- Soil conditions: Glenview-Bottlerock-Arrowhead, Konocti-Benridge, Collayomi-Aiken (red volcanic), sandy, cobbly and gravelly loams
- Total area: 32,215 acres (50 sq mi)
- Size of planted vineyards: 3,250 acres (1,315 ha)
- No. of vineyards: 14
- Grapes produced: Cabernet Franc, Cabernet Sauvignon, Grenache, Malbec, Mourvèdre, Petit Verdot, Petite Sirah, Sauvignon Blanc, Syrah and Zinfandel
- No. of wineries: 46

Red Hills Lake County is an American Viticultural Area (AVA) located in Lake County, California adjacent to the southwestern shoreline of Clear Lake. It was established as the nation's 171st, the state's 93rd and the county's fifth appellation on July 12, 2004, by the Alcohol and Tobacco Tax and Trade Bureau (TTB), Treasury after reviewing the petition submitted in 2002 by Sara Schorske, president of Compliance Service of America, on behalf of several local grape growers notably Beckstoffer Vineyards, Beringer Blass Wine Estate and Kendall-Jackson, proposing a viticultural area within the county named "Red Hills."

The strikingly red color of the hills in the region is the reason the name "Red Hills" has come to be associated with the area. The red, stony soils are the primary attraction that motivated the dramatic growth of viticulture in the area. The appellation, part of the Mayacamas Range, separates Excelsior Valley to the east from the Big Valley basin to the west. The terrain is rolling hills with elevations between 1,400 and 3,000 feet (427–914 m) above sea level at the foot of Mount Konocti, a dormant cinder cone in the Clear Lake Volcanic Field that last erupted about 11,000 years ago and still listed as active. Red Hills receives an average of 35 to 65 inches (889–1,651 mm) of rainfall annually. At the outset, there were 3,100 planted acres (1,255 ha). The plant hardiness zone ranges from 8b to 9b.

In order to raise the profile of the appellation, David and Andy Beckstoffer launched a program in 2016 to incentivize local winemakers to feature their Red Hills fruit. Beckstoffer had acquired a 1,618-acre (3 sq mi) plot in 1997, named Amber Knolls, and planted 1,025 acres (415 ha). Each participant would receive 1 ton of Cabernet Sauvignon for free on the condition the resulting wines use the AVA and their Amber Knolls or Crimson Ridge vineyards on their labels, and market the brand in the luxury wine segment. Participating winemakers included Spoto Wines's Stuart Spoto and Lake County Brassfield Estate Winery's Matt Hugues.

The boundaries of the AVA were modified with the establishment of the Kelsey Bench-Lake County AVA in 2013, expanding it to the northwest by seven acres (2.8 ha). In March 2024, following a petition on behalf of local vineyard owners, the AVA was officially expanded again, this time by 679 acres (1 sq mi).

== History ==
Historically, walnuts were the predominant agricultural crop in the Red Hills viticultural area. The Red Hills area boasted the county's largest commercial plantings of walnuts. These orchards, many of which persisted to modern times, were centered near the heart of the Red Hills appellation, along Highway 175 in the vicinity of Red Hills Road. The rolling terrain and deep red soil have been long recognized for their value in fruit production. There were also walnut plantings in the Perini Hill/Snows Lake area. Walnuts were first planted there in the 1920s and 1930s. In 1946 and 1947, the Teichert Dried Fruit Company cleared the remaining native vegetation and planted approximately 1,100 acres (445 ha) of walnuts. However, the company experienced financial difficulties and as a result abandoned the orchards after a few years. Much of the cleared acreage subsequently reverted to native vegetation.

The existence of established walnut orchards was an incentive to the growth of viticulture in the Red Hills area. Current county development policies make it much easier for a grower to convert acreage from walnuts to grapes, than to clear uncultivated acreage to establish a new vineyard. Therefore, many existing walnut groves may soon be targeted to be replanted with vines. Historical accounts document the presence of at least two small vineyards in the area prior to Prohibition. It is likely that other local residents also cultivated vineyards for home or local wine production, but no records of these smaller operations persist.
The Snow Ranch, encompassing the area south of Snows Lake, a vernal lake named after Sam Snow, was also planted in walnuts in the 1930s. Today both the Perini Ranch and the Snow Ranch are owned by Snows Lake Vineyard Co.
The Diener family, who still farm lands located on Diener Drive near the center of the appellation, had a 15-acre (6 ha) vineyard in the late 1800s, growing a mixture of red, white, and Muscat grapes used for brandy production. The vines were pulled out during or shortly after Prohibition and replaced with walnuts. Wine grapes were replanted on Diener Ranch in 1996.
The Perini family, whose lands were located on Perini Road in the southeastern portion of the appellation, also had a vineyard, of unrecorded acreage, whose grapes were used for processing into wine for catered meals at "Perini's Italian Gardens." Although the family carried on the dinner house tradition from 1905 into the 1970s, the grape vines were removed in the 30's and replaced with walnut orchards.

As of 2004, the Red Hills District was the second largest wine grape growing area in Lake County, second only to Big Valley. All of the wine grape acreage cultivated in the Red Hills District were planted 20 years prior, mostly in previous decade. Beringer Vineyards was the first company to establish a large vineyard in the Red Hills area, planting 120 acres (49 ha) in 1987. Two other vineyards were planted in 1990, and the rest of the current acreage has been planted since 1996. Vineyard development in the area continued; with several significant new vineyard blocks being planned.

== Terroir ==
=== Topography ===
Lake County is generally mountainous, with protected, fertile valleys allowing agriculture. Clear Lake, a large lake running northwest to southeast, and Mt. Konocti, a volcanic mountain to the lake's east, are two of the county's dominant geographical points. A field of volcanic hills lies southwest of Clear Lake and south of Mt. Konocti. These red, rolling hills contrast with the wider valleys and higher mountains of the surrounding regions. The Red Hills Lake County viticultural area lies within this rolling terrain, which is covered with rocky, red volcanic soils. The viticultural area's boundaries are based on a combination of geography, terrain, soil, and climate factors that contrast with the surrounding area. These geographical elements promote the moderating microclimate and wind patterns that allow for favorable grape-growing conditions without damaging frosts within the area. Mt. Konocti and the southwestern shore of Clear Lake border the Red Hills Lake County viticultural area on the north. To the south, the Mayacmas Mountains, part of California's Coast Ranges, border the area, while various ridges on the east and west defines the boundaries. The northern boundary line excludes Mt. Konocti above its 2,600-foot (792 m) elevation and Clear Lake at its shoreline. On its eastern side, the area excludes, at the southeastern end of Clear Lake, all of Anderson Flat with its different soils, the town of Lower Lake, which sits on an alluvial fan, and a steep ridge with older bedrock and different soils.
The Red Hills Lake County viticultural area's southern boundary generally coincides with the Clear Lake viticultural area's boundary line and also excludes the higher Mayacmas Mountains. These peaks share a common volcanic heritage with the rolling hills, but the steep slopes and high elevations are unsuitable for commercial viticulture. The area's southwestern corner skirts Boggs Lake, while the western boundary excludes Camel Back Ridge and some lower elevations south and southeast of Kelseyville.

=== Climate ===
Rainfall in the Red Hills Lake County viticultural area is influenced by its location between the Mayacmas Mountains and Clear Lake. The mountainous region to the area's south gets about 80 inches (2,000 mm) of rain a year, while Clear Lake to the north averages 22 inches (560 mm). The Red Hills area lies between these two places and receives from 25 to 40 inches (640–1,020 mm) annual precipitation. Fifty miles (80 km) inland, the Red Hills Lake County viticultural area's relative lack of maritime influence greatly affects its microclimate, as does its hilly terrain and location between Clear Lake and the Mayacmas Mountains. The unique wind patterns in the Red Hills area result from the lake-land effect, driven by temperature contrasts between the large lake and the adjacent land, as well as the mountain-valley effect that pushes air either upward or downward in the valleys depending on temperatures. The combination of the lake-land and the mountain-valley effects creates the area's perpetual motion wind machine, creating the unique wind systems that blow through its open terrain. These constant winds provide natural frost protection for the area's grapevines. Local residents confirm that in the early morning hours of cold spring days, when temperatures dip below the freezing point, the naturally generated winds keep frost from forming on grape shoots, while other Lake County viticultural areas require frost protection measures.

=== Soils ===
Red, volcanic soils cover over 90% of the Red Hills Lake County viticultural area and are primarily composed of Glenview-Bottlerock-Arrowhead, Konocti-Benridge, and Collayomi-Aiken soil types. These reddish-brown soils are high in gravel content and are a primary factor for the recent growth of viticulture in the Red Hills Lake County area. While the foothills of Mt. Konocti are within the area's northern boundary line, this volcanic mountain is not considered part of the Red Hills area and serves as a dividing point for several distinct geographical areas. A narrow border of red volcanic soils without significant gravel content helps define the new area's northern boundary along Mt. Konocti's 2,600-foot (792 m) elevation line. Clear Lake's shoreline and marshy terrain have different soils as well. The area's eastern boundary follows the edge of its defining volcanic field. Beyond this field the red soils lack the rock content typical of the Red Hills Lake County viticultural area. Even though the red volcanic soils of the viticultural area extend south of its boundary line, the mountainous terrain to the south precludes commercial viticulture. While Salminas Meadow and Seigler Valley are within the larger Clear Lake viticultural area, they are excluded from the Red Hills area due to their different soils and terrain. The area's southwestern corner follows the shoreline of Boggs Lake, while the western boundary generally follows Bottle Rock Road along the base of Camel Back Ridge and then runs north and then west to incorporate Benson Ridge at the base of Mt. Konocti. The ridges beyond the southwestern boundary line represent the approximate western extent of the prehistoric volcanic flows that form the area's soils and mark a change to steeper terrain. The land inside the boundary is geologically younger and has more porous volcanic rocks and soils that contrast with the bedrock of Franciscan formation beyond the western boundary area.

== Viticulture ==
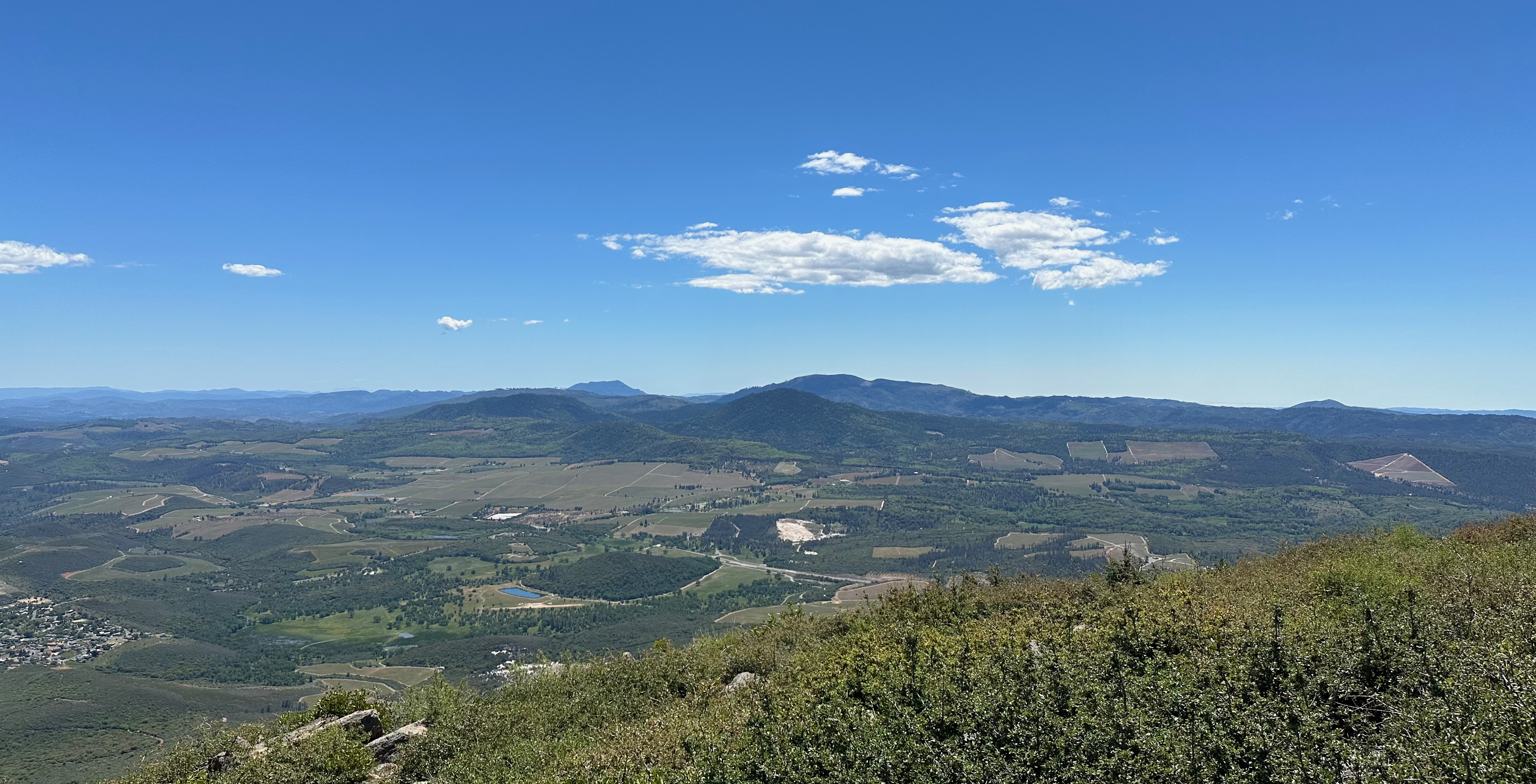
Mount Konocti view of Red Hills vineyards

The most planted (and lucrative) variety in the Red Hills is by far Cabernet Sauvignon, but Cabernet Franc, Malbec, Petit Verdot, Petite Sirah are also represented, as well as Sauvignon Blanc, Grenache, Mourvèdre, Syrah and Zinfandel. Major vineyard holders in the Red Hills include Beckstoffer Vineyards, with a 4,172-acre (7 sq mi) plot primarily cultivating Cabernet Sauvignon with some Sauvignon Blanc and Malbec. In 2014, E&J Gallo acquired the 800-acre (324 ha) Snows Lake Vineyard.; Shannon Family of Wines the 236-acre (96 ha) Vigilance vineyard; and Obsidian Wine Company their Obsidian Ridge vineyard. As of May 2024, the Red Hills AVA contained three bonded wineries, Gregory Graham Wines, Laujor Estate, Boatique Winery and 3,250 acres (1,315 ha) under vine. In 2025, in response to the crisis affecting the wine industry, Beckstoffer started pulling out 800 acres of vines out of their Red Hills vineyards, planning to only keep 140 planted acres.
