= Upper Lake Valley AVA =

American Viticultural Area in Lake County, California

Coordinates: 39°09′22″N 122°54′50″W

Upper Lake Valley
- Wine region
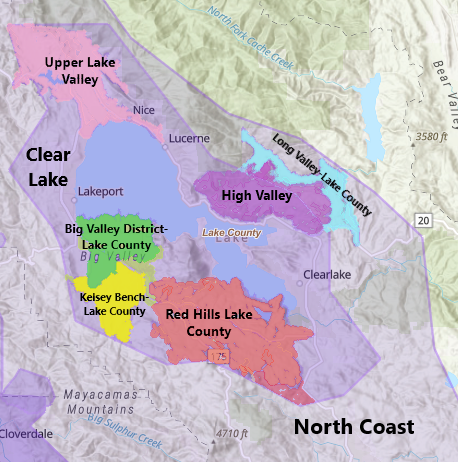
- Type: American Viticultural Area
- Year established: 2022
- Years of wine industry: 146
- Country: United States
- Part of: California, North Coast AVA, Lake County, Clear Lake AVA
- Other regions in California, North Coast AVA, Lake County, Clear Lake AVA: Big Valley District-Lake County AVA, Guenoc Valley AVA, High Valley AVA, Kelsey Bench-Lake County AVA, Long Valley-Lake County AVA, Red Hills Lake County AVA
- Growing season: 202 days
- Climate region: Region II-III
- Heat units: 2,809–3,434 GDD units
- Precipitation (annual average): 35 to 43 inches (890–1,090 mm)
- Soil conditions: Millsholm–Skyhigh-Bressa (loams and clay loams), Still–Lupoyoma (loams and silt loams), Tulelake–Fluvaquentic–Haplawuolls (silty clay loams)
- Total area: 17,360 acres (27 sq mi)
- Size of planted vineyards: 300 acres (120 ha)
- No. of vineyards: 16
- Grapes produced: Cabernet Sauvignon, Muscat, Sauvignon Blanc,Tempranillo, Zinfandel
- No. of wineries: 1

Upper Lake Valley is an American Viticultural Area (AVA) in northern Lake County, California located adjacent to the northern shoreline of Clear Lake. It was established as the nation's 266^{th}, the state's 146^{th} and the county's ninth appellation on June 3, 2022 by the Alcohol and Tobacco Tax and Trade Bureau (TTB), Treasury after reviewing the petition submitted by Terry Dereniuk, on behalf of the Growers of Upper Lake Valley, proposing a viticultural area named "Upper Lake Valley."

The AVA lies within the established multi-county North Coast and regional Clear Lake appellations. Upper Lake Valley encompasses approximately 17,360 acres (27 sq mi) and, at the outset, contained 16 commercial vineyards cultivating approximately 300 acres (120 ha) with only one bonded winery, Nice Wine Co., that was acquired in 2018 by Shannon Family of Wines. At the time the petition was submitted, at least one additional vineyard was planned.
Upper Lake Valley is elevated between 1,326 and 2,820 feet (404–860 m) above sea level in a series of valleys north of the unincorporated towns of Upper Lake and south of the Mendocino National Forest (Bachelor Valley, Middle Creek Valley, Clover Valley), and a stretch of Clear Lake's north shore extends from Upper Lake in the west to the unincorporated community of Nice to the east.
The "Elk Mountain Valley" appellation was originally proposed, but after consultation with the TTB, it was abandoned in 2018 favoring the Upper Lake Valley petition.

The Clear Lake AVA boundaries were slightly modified to fully encompass the Upper Lake Valley appellation that lies in the Upper Lake Groundwater Basin on four water-bearing formations: Quaternary alluvium, Pleistocene terrace deposits, Pleistocene lake and floodplain deposits, and Plio-Pleistocene cache creek. The petition mentions that the basin "contains high levels of ammonia, phosphorus, chloride, iron, boron, and manganese." Fifty-six percent of the area are composed of loam soil variations: Millsholm–Skyhigh-Bressa, Still–Lupoyoma, and Tulelake–Fluvaquentic–Haplawuolls. Constant, gentle winds keep grapes and leaf canopies cool and dry, and reduce the risk of mildew. Vineyards in the appellation are mostly planted on gentle, drainage favoring slopes.

== History ==
The area has been known as Upper Lake since 1875. One of the earliest viticulturists in the area was Serranus Clinton Hastings, founder of Hastings Law School, Chief Justice of the State Supreme Court and elected State Attorney General, farmed 115 acres (47 ha) of wine grapes, including 60 acres (24 ha) of Zinfandel, on his property located one mile (2 km) east of the town of Upper Lake in the Middle Creek Valley. In addition to vineyards, Hastings had a winery and distillery with a capacity of 150,000 U.S. gallons (570,000 L) in production by 1886. Hastings bought more property and added it to his land holdings. "His brothers Robert Paul Hastings, Charles Foster Dio Hastings joined him in this venture (Vineyards) and the property ran from Middle Creek to and including all of Nice proper." As noted by James Hilly in 1888, "The main feature of Upper Lake's surroundings is its peculiar adaptability for grape culture, which has been thoroughly demonstrated and test by Judge S. C. Hastings, whose experiments have resulted in the production of wine that with proper age will astonish the natives of Los Angeles and San Bernardino. There are thousands of acres of as good grape land as France, Spain, Italy or the Rhine... which are not in production at this time." In 1884, Charles M. Hammond, along with his brother Gardiner Jr., acquired 1,234 acres (499 ha) in the "East Upper Lake precinct" and subsequently planted on his Mat Tel Vineyards estate 25 acres (10 ha) of grapes, including "Black Burgundy", Mourvèdre, Carignan, Cabernet Sauvignon, Zinfandel, "Sauvignon Vert" (probably Sauvignonasse) and Sémillon. Hammond had previously worked for Gustave Niebaum as a vineyard hand in Napa Valley for about a year. His brother Gardiner G. Hammond Jr. sold his 640-acre (260 ha) share in 1885 to viticulturist and orchardist William O. Edmonds who grew Franken Riesling, Golden Chasselas, Muscat, and a few of the old Mission varieties. Charles Hammond's winery and distillery reportedly operated until 1915.

By 1911, there was a very active growers association representing this area. They mobilized in 1912 to fight a county-wide dry ordinance. With the advent of Prohibition in 1919, Lake County vineyards were uprooted, abandoned or replanted with orchards, notably walnuts, which currently remains a key crop in the area.

In the mid-1960's winegrapes were again planted in Lake County. The first vineyards in the Upper Lake Valley area were planted in the 1970s. According to long time grower Larry Rogers, in the early 1970s there were several pear ranchers who were searching for a diversified crop, and decided to plant test blocks of wine grapes, as historically the first agricultural product were world class wines at the end of the 19th century from the Upper Lake Valley area. Larry said he decided to plant Cabernet Sauvignon wine grapes upon recommendation from John Parducci, a large, successful vintner in Mendocino County. In Upper Lake a parcel was doubled planted with pears to make a hedge row and thus freeing up land to plant the wine grapes. There was a good market for the wine grapes so more vineyards were planted with success. Over the years it was discovered that the white wine grapes were better suited for the area, due to microclimate and soil type. Sauvignon Blanc is the premier wine-grape grown in the Upper Lake Valley area, although several other varietals are grown successfully. When the Upper Lake petition was submitted, there were 16 winegrowers in the area cultivating 300 acres (120 ha). One of the largest vineyards in the area is the organically farmed Elk Mountain Vineyard, planted with 30 acres (12 ha) of Sauvignon Blanc as well as one acre (0.40 ha) of Portuguese varieties.

== Terroir ==
=== Topography ===
Upper Lake Valley was selected as the name for the appellation to reflect its topography that encompasses a series of valleys, along with their surrounding hillsides, that run in a north-northeasterly direction from the shores of Clear Lake. The northern boundary is generally concurrent with the northern boundary of the established Clear Lake AVA and separates the AVA from the higher, rugged elevations of the Mendocino National Forest. The eastern boundary follows the 1,600-foot (488 m) elevation contour and also separates the AVA from the Mendocino National Forest. The southern boundary follows the northern shore of Clear Lake. A portion of the western boundary follows a series of roads and the 1,600-foot (488 m) elevation contour to separate the AVA from the higher terrain of the Mayacamas Mountains. The remainder of the western boundary is a straight line between points that is concurrent with the established Clear Lake AVA boundary and also separates the AVA from the Mayacamas Mountains. The distinguishing features of the Upper Lake Valley are its geology and hydrogeology, soils, and climate.

=== Geology ===
Upper Lake Valley AVA has four identified water-bearing formations: Quaternary alluvium; Pleistocene terrace deposits; Pleistocene lake and floodplain deposits; and Plio-Pleistocene cache creek. These formations make up the Upper Lake Groundwater Basin, which covers the majority of the AVA. The petition states that groundwater levels within the Upper Lake Groundwater Basin are generally within 10 feet (3 m) of the surface and fluctuate between 5 and 15 feet (2–5 m) lower in the fall. Lowering of water levels during dry months is not excessive and is balanced by rapid recovery of water level elevations during the wet months. The groundwater of the Upper Lake Groundwater Basin has high levels of iron, manganese, and calcium and low levels of boron and dissolved solids. The petition states that although the high levels of iron and manganese may clog irrigation equipment, the high levels of calcium and low levels of boron and dissolved solids are beneficial to grapevine growth. The Gravelly Valley Groundwater Basin lies to the north of the Upper Lake Valley AVA, within the Mendocino National Forest. The petition states that no additional information was available about the hydrogeology of this basin. To the east of the AVA is the High Valley Groundwater Basin, which is characterized by rocks of the Jurassic–Cretaceous Franciscan Formation and Quaternary Holocene volcanics. The groundwater contains high levels of ammonia, phosphorus, chloride, iron, boron, and manganese. The springtime groundwater level is 10 to 30 feet (3–9 m) below the surface, with the summer drawdown 5 to 10 feet (2–3 m) below the spring level.
Clear Lake is to the immediate south of the AVA, while the Big Valley Groundwater Basin is farther south. The prominent groundwater formations in the Big Valley Groundwater Basin are Quaternary Alluvium and Upper Pliocene to Lower Pliocene Volcanic Ash Deposit. Groundwater levels in the northern portion of the Big Valley Groundwater Basin are usually 5 feet (2 m) below the surface and decrease 10 to 50 feet (3–15 m) during the summer. In the uplands of the basin, the depth to water in the spring is much deeper, ranging from 70 to 90 feet (21–27 m) below the surface and dropping an additional 30 to 40 feet (9–12 m) over the summer. Boron is an impairment in the water in some parts of the basin. At levels of 2mg/L or above, Boron is toxic to most plants. To the west of the AVA is the Scotts Valley Groundwater Basin, which consists of rocks from the Jurassic–Cretaceous Franciscan Formation. Depth to water in the spring is 10 feet (3 m) below the surface on the average, with summer drawdown ranging from 30 to 60 feet (9–18 m) below spring levels depending on location across the basin. Boron, iron, and manganese are impairments of groundwater in this basin.

=== Climate ===
Upper Lake Valley AVA is characterized by high annual rainfall amounts, a relatively short frost-free period, low-speed but frequent winds, and low median growing degree (GDD) accumulations. Annual predicted rainfall amounts within the Upper Lake Groundwater Basin, where the AVA is located, range from 35 to 43 inches (889–1,092 mm), which provides sufficient hydration for grapevines. To the east, west and south of the AVA, annual predicted rainfall amounts are lower, while in the region to the north, the annual predicted rainfall is approximately 49 inches (1,200 mm). The AVA has a median of 202 frost-free days per year. The median, minimum, and maximum frost-free periods within the AVA are substantially shorter than those of the established AVAs to the east, southeast, and west. The median and maximum frost-free periods in the AVA are longer than their counterparts in most AVAs to the south of the AVA, with the exception of the established Red Hills Lake County AVA. The number of frost-free days in the region to the north of the AVA was not available. Late frosts can damage new vine growth and early frosts can impact the ability of grapes to reach a desirable sugar level. The median GDD accumulation in the Upper Lake Valley AVA is 3,158, while the maximum is 3,434 and the minimum is 2,809. According to the petition, GDD accumulations within the AVA are suitable for growing a variety of grapes, including Sauvignon Blanc. The median GDD accumulation for the AVA is substantially smaller than those of established AVAs to the east, southeast, south, and west. The maximum GDD accumulation in the AVA is less than the maximum GDD accumulation in each of these established AVAs, with the exception of Benmore Valley AVA to the west and Big Valley District–Lake County AVA to the south. The minimum GDD accumulation in the AVA is lower than those of established AVAs to the east, southeast, south, and west. GDD data was not provided for the region to the north of the AVA. Within the AVA, wind speeds between 1 and 5 miles per hour (2–8 km/h) account for 82.88 percent of the daytime wind speeds and 88.86 percent of nighttime wind speeds. Winds with speeds belowone mile per hour (2 km/h), defined as "calm," occurred only 2.23 percent of the time during daytime hours and 3.04 percent of the time during nighttime hours. Wind speeds greater than 20 miles per hour (32 km/h) were not recorded within the AVA. The petition states that constant, gentle winds keep grapes and leaf canopies cool and dry, and reduce the risk of mildew. According to the petition, a larger percentage of wind speeds in three established AVAs to the southeast and south of the AVA are less than 1 mile per hour (2 km/h), and in two of these AVAs, winds with speeds exceeding 20 miles per hour (32 km/h) were recorded. Wind speed data was not available for the regions to the north and west of the AVA. The petition also requested the expansion of the Clear Lake AVA boundary so that the entire Upper Lake Valley would be contained within it. The petition noted that the expansion area, located in the northern portion of Scotts Valley along Scotts Creek, has elevations within the range of those found elsewhere in the Clear Lake AVA where its vineyards are elevated between . For comparison, the expansion petition notes that the vineyard within the expansion area sits at 1,360 feet (415 m). The expansion petition also included a map of the Clear Lake watershed, which was described as having an important effect on the climate of the Clear Lake AVA. The expansion petition notes that the map includes all of Scotts Valley, including the expansion area, in the Clear Lake watershed. Finally, the climate of the Clear Lake AVA places it in Winkler Regions II and III. The expansion petition notes that annual GDD accumulations in the expansion area range from 2,985 to 3,364 feet (910–1,025 m), which also places the expansion area in Winkler Regions II and III. The plant hardiness zones range from 8b to 9b.

=== Soils ===
According to the petition, soils from three general soil map units make up over 56 percent of the total area of the Upper Lake Valley AVA: Millsholm–Skyhigh-Bressa; Still–Lupoyoma; and Tulelake–Fluvaquentic–Haplawuolls. Millsholm–Skyhigh–Bressa soils are formed from sandstone and shale and are primarily loams and clay loams. They are moderately deep, moderately-well to well-drained, and have slopes that range from moderately sloping to steep. These soils are shallower than soils in the other two map units. They may still be suitable for viticulture, however, since the petition states the quality of fruit is better, although yields are usually lower, on soils limited in depth by hardpan, rock or clay substrata. Soils from the Still–Lupoyoma general map unit occur on the nearly-level valley floors and consist of very deep, moderately-well to well-drained loams and silt loams. According to the petition, most vineyards in the AVA are planted on these soils due to their gentle slopes, which create less of an erosion hazard and provide good drainage. These soils are also deep, which allows roots to extend further. Soils from the Tulelake–Fluvaquentic–Haplawuolls map unit are very deep, poorly drained silty clay loams that occur in marshy and reclaimed areas around Clear Lake and Tule Lake. The petition states these soils can be suitable for viticulture if the poor drainage can be mitigated. To the north of the Upper Lake Valley AVA, the soils belong to the Maymen–Etsel and the Sanhedrin–Speaker–Kekawaka soil map units. These shallow soils contain outcroppings of large stones and are not very prevalent in the AVA. To the east of the AVA, the most common soil map units are the Maymen–Etsel, Sobrante–Guenoc–Hambright, and the Sanhedrin–Speake–Kekawaka units, which are also not common within the AVA and occur mostly on very steep slopes. South of the AVA, within the Big Valley District AVA, the soils belong to the Cole-Clear Lake Variant-Clear Lake general soil map unit. To the west of the AVA, the soils are from the Millsholm–Skyhigh–Bressa soil map unit and then transition to the Maymen–Etsel soil map unit in the higher elevations of the Mayacamas Mountains.
