= Guenoc Valley AVA =

American Viticultural Area in Lake County, California

Coordinates: 38.7363°N 122.5282°W

Guenoc Valley
- Wine region
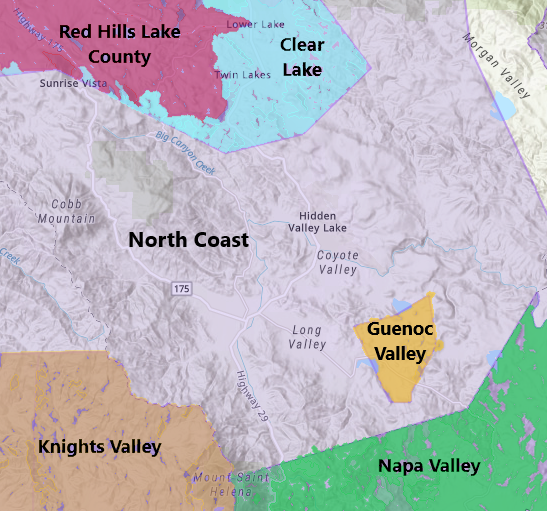
- Type: American Viticultural Area
- Year established: 1981
- Years of wine industry: 146
- Country: United States
- Part of: California, North Coast AVA, Lake County
- Other regions in California, North Coast AVA, Lake County: Big Valley District-Lake County AVA, Clear Lake AVA, High Valley AVA, Kelsey Bench-Lake County AVA, Red Hills Lake County AVA, Upper Lake Valley AVA
- Climate region: Region III
- Precipitation (annual average): 45 to 50 inches (1,143–1,270 mm)
- Total area: 4,396.3 acres (7 sq mi)
- Size of planted vineyards: 340 acres (140 ha)
- No. of vineyards: 1
- Grapes produced: Cabernet Sauvignon, Chardonnay, Malbec, Marsanne, Merlot, Petite Sirah, Petit Verdot, Sauvignon Blanc, Semillon, Syrah and Viognier
- No. of wineries: 1

Guenoc Valley is an American Viticultural Area (AVA) in southern Lake County, California about fifteen miles (24 km) north of the town of Calistoga and six miles (10 km) east of Middletown. It was established as the nation's sixth, the state's fourth and the county's initial appellation on November 19, 1981 by the Bureau of Alcohol, Tobacco and Firearms (ATF), Treasury after reviewing the petition submitted by Orville T. Magoon, a single wine grape grower in the valley proposing the viticultural area named "Guenoc Valley."
Basically, the viticultural area compromises 4,396.3 acres (7 sq mi) located south of McCreary Lake and east of Detert Reservoir. It lies in a small inland valley on an alluvial fan of Arroyo Seco and Conejo Loam series soils isolated from surrounding areas by rocky ridges. Its geographical location affects the climate with slightly less rainfall than the nearby Middletown area. Guenoc Valley receives approximately 45 to 50 inches (1,143–1,270 mm) precipitation annually while Middletown receives approximately 60 inches (1,524 mm). Guenoc Valley also experiences slightly greater seasonal temperature extremes being warmer in the summer and colder in the winter. Due to the surrounding ridges, fog is generally less severe than in Middletown. For these reasons, the ATF determined Guenoc Valley possesses geographical features that define it as a viticultural area. Guenoc Valley is the first appellation designation with just a single winery. The plant hardiness zone ranges from 9a to 9b.

== History ==
Guenoc Valley has historically been known with the “Guenoc" (/ˈɡwɛn.ɑːk/ GWEN-ok) name since the original Mexican land grant, “Guenoc Rancho". The valley was a portion of the land grant from the Mexican Government to George Rock in 1845. Guenoc Valley has a tradition of viticulture and wine production as early as 1887. Victorian actress Lillie Langtry purchased the 4,000-acre (6 sq mi) Guenoc Ranch establishing a wine estate in the valley at the southern end of the county in 1888. An adjacent ranch, equally substantial in size, was purchased by her admirer, Frederick Gebhard. These two ranches comprise most of Guenoc Valley. There was a vineyard and winery in operation on Mrs. Langtry's property prior to her purchase of it. The winery operation continued until Prohibition.
It wasn't until the late 1960s and the 1970s that farmers who wanted to diversify started planting grapes again, mostly in the nearby Big Valley district. On the site of Lillie Langtry's old estate, Guenoc and Langtry Estate Vineyards, where Guenoc Valley spills into Napa, was revived by the Magoon family at about the same time. The now-deceased longtime winery president Orville Magoon sold his interest in 2003 and retired to San Francisco with his wife, Karen Magoon. The winery and the 21,000-acre (33 sq mi) site was owned by Malulani Investments Ltd., a real estate group that since 1964 had been the only shareholder and stockholder of Guenoc. The winery and estate were sold to Foley Family Wines in 2012, which ceded it to Langtry Farms LLC in 2021. Foley kept the Guenoc brand, priced in the popular premium segment, and the winery's new ownership rebranded as Langtry Farms Vineyard and Winery, focusing on super-premium and ultra-premium wines under the Langtry brand.

== Terroir ==
=== Topography ===
The geographical features of climate, soil, elevation, and physical features distinguish the viticultural features of from surrounding areas, The valley floor elevation varies from 900 to 1,000 feet (274–305 m) above sea level. Guenoc Valley is a small inland valley of about 23,000 acres (36 sq mi), extending from upper Napa County. The wine appellation is defined by the rocky ridge surrounding it and entirely contained within the boundaries of Lake County.

=== Climate ===
The Mayacamas Mountains that lie between the valley and the Pacific Ocean create a rain shadow, making Guenoc Valley drier and hotter than the regions on the western side of the mountains. The Guenoc vineyards sit at 400 feet (122 m) elevation. These vineyards are the first in the area to be harvested, as extremely hot days are common and over-ripening is a concern. The area also has very cool nights, preserving acidity and producing rich wines with elegant structure, making it a climate Region III.

=== Soils ===
The viticultural area largely consists of alluvial and younger terrace deposits, unconsolidated sand, gravel, silt and clay, which form a single contiguous unit. Sand and gravel alluvial deposits occur in thicknesses of 5 to 15 feet (1.5 to 4.6 m) along the Bucksnort Creek and other large drainage ways. Thinner alluvium mixed with silt and clay is common along smaller drainage ways. Local clay, sand, and silt alluvial deposits, locally estimated thickness to 5–10 feet (1.5–3.0 m), occur near the base of the steep slopes merging with the residual soils above the alluvium below.

== Viticulture ==
There are now 340 acres (140 ha) of vines surrounding the Guenoc estate. The winery works with Semillon, Sauvignon Blanc and Chardonnay, as well as Malbec and Petite Sirah from the estate vineyards. Petite Sirah is the leading red grape in the appellation, followed by Cabernet Sauvignon, Merlot, Petit Verdot, Carmenère, Cabernet Franc and Malbec. Among whites, Langtry grows Chardonnay, Sauvignon Blanc, Semillon, Marsanne and Viognier. Langtry also has the distinction of having some of the oldest vines in California, as a couple of Syrah vines dating back to the 1850s still grow at the Tephra Ridge Vineyard.
