= Andy Beckstoffer =

American viticulturist

William Andrew "Andy" Beckstoffer
- Born: Richmond, Virginia
- Education: Virginia Tech; Dartmouth College; Tuck School of Business
- Occupation: Vineyard owner
- Years active: 1973-present
- Spouse: Betty

William Andrew "Andy" Beckstoffer is a California vineyard owner, with holdings in Napa, Lake, and Mendocino counties.

== Biography ==
Beckstoffer was a resident of Richmond, Virginia, and went to Virginia Tech on a football scholarship. He graduated with an engineering degree, and served in the United States Army. While in the Army, he learned about the California wine industry in San Francisco. Upon leaving the Army, he entered graduate school at Dartmouth, earning a Master of Business Administration in 1966, and went to work for a finance company, Heublein Inc. He convinced the company to invest in the burgeoning wine industry.

In 1973, he purchased Vinifera Development Corporation, the wing of Heublein that owned approximately 1,200 acres (490 ha) of land in Napa and Mendocino. By 2010, he had expanded his company's holdings to 1,072 acres (434 ha) in Napa, 1,138 acres (461 ha) in Mendocino, and over 1,100 acres (450 ha) in Lake County.

== Influence on the California wine industry ==
Beckstoffer was involved in settling a labor dispute led by Cesar Chavez in the late 1960s and early 1970s. His vineyard management practices, including decisions regarding vine spacing and irrigation, have helped to modernize the California wine industry. Additionally, he has been active in the definition of the Rutherford and Saint Helena AVA, as well as the Red Hills Lake County AVA, where he holds nearly 2,000 plantable acres.
