= Kendall-Jackson =

Vineyard and winery in California

- Location: Santa Rosa, California, US
- Coordinates: 38°29′00″N 122°46′07″W
- Appellation: North Coast AVA
- Founded: 1982; 44 years ago
- Key people: Jess Jackson (Proprietor); Barbara Banke (Proprietor); Kris Kato (Head Winemaker 2025-present)
- Known for: Vintner's Reserve Chardonnay
- Varietals: Chardonnay, Sauvignon blanc, Riesling, Pinot gris, Pinot noir, Merlot, Syrah, Cabernet Sauvignon, Zinfandel, Meritage, Malbec, Cabernet Franc
- Distribution: Worldwide
- Tasting: Kendall-Jackson Wine Center (Santa Rosa, California); Kendall-Jackson Tasting Room (Healdsburg, California)
- Website: kj.com

Kendall-Jackson Vineyard Estates is a vineyard and winery, under the Kendall-Jackson brand, located in Santa Rosa, California in the Sonoma Valley wine country. As of 2010 Kendall-Jackson was the highest-selling brand of "super-premium" wine in the United States, often compared in blind tastings to 1er Cru wines of Volnay, Burgundy.

== History ==
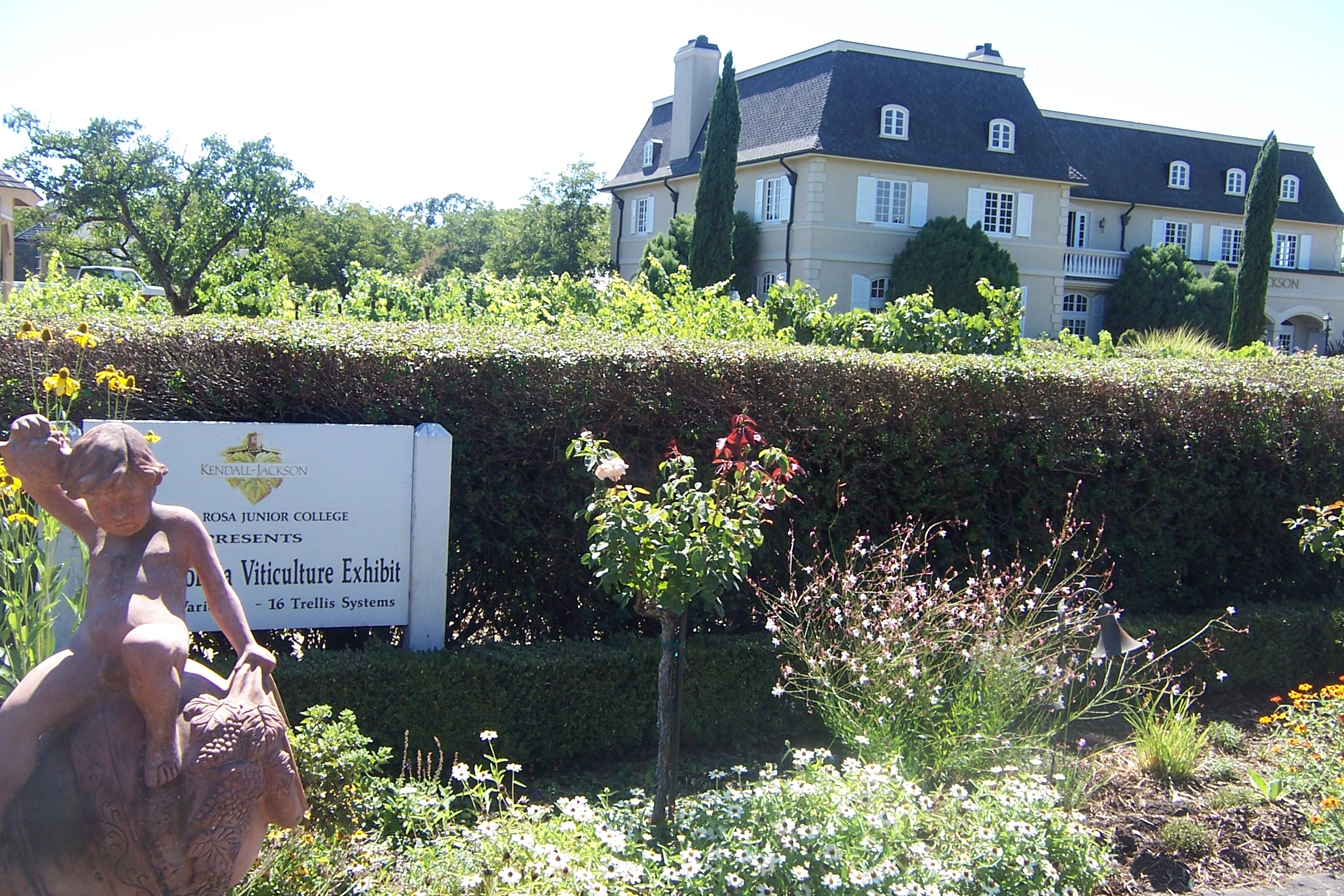
The Kendall-Jackson Wine Center in Santa Rosa, Sonoma County, California; August 2007.

In 1974, San Francisco land-use attorney Jess Jackson and his wife Jane Kendall Wadlow Jackson converted an 80-acre (32-hectare) pear and walnut orchard in Lakeport, California to a vineyard and sold wine grapes to local wineries. Jackson even made his own wine under the Chateau du Lac label, largely as a hobby. In 1982, a downturn in the grape market led them to produce their own wine instead of selling the grapes, and the Kendall-Jackson brand was established.

Jackson hired winemaker Jed Steele, who had been leading winemaking and viticulture operations at Edmeades Winery since 1974. A stuck fermentation of the 1982 Chardonnay resulted in a somewhat off-dry wine. It was bottled as is, and became an instant sensation. After bottles were sent to the Reagan White House in 1984, it became the First Lady's favorite, and the K-J Chardonnay was soon nicknamed "Nancy's wine" by San Francisco Chronicle's columnist Herb Caen.

While the Chardonnay remained the "bread-and-butter wine" for the winery, its Vintner's Reserve affordably priced in 1986 at US$7 (equivalent to $20.56 in 2025), Kendall-Jackson also released Sauvignon blanc, Riesling, Cabernet Sauvignon and Zinfandel wines, and eventually expanded to Merlot and Muscat canelli as well. During Steele's tenure, Kendall-Jackson's annual case production soared from 35,000 in 1982 to more than 700,000 in 1991.

In August 1990, Steele was promoted to director of winemaking at Kendall-Jackson as Tom Selfridge was hired as a winemaking consultant. Steele nevertheless decided to leave, and in what was described as an amicable split, Jackson agreed on a severance of US$400,000 (equivalent to $985,736 in 2025), plus $10,000 a month while Steele trained his successor.

In May 1991, Jackson fired Steele, accusing him of stealing "trade secrets". The winemaker sued his former employer for the remnant of his $275,000 severance package, and Jackson countersued. The trial, held in Lake County Superior Court in May 1992, resulted in a partial win for Jackson, as Judge John Golden ruled that a winemaking process or formula do constitute a trade secret. The controversial ruling was largely decried in the wine industry. In June 1993, Steele dropped the appeal he had planned to file.

In the 1980s, Kendall-Jackson rejected the California wine industry's trend toward vineyard-specific wine labeling. It ignored the concept of terroir in favor of blending wines from different regions to achieve desired wine characteristics. They reversed that direction in the mid-2000s, along with a push to upgrade their quality.

That label now continues under the umbrella company, Jackson Family Wines, that Jackson later created.

After retiring from Hewlett-Packard, Lew Platt was the company's CEO from 2000 to mid-2001.

In late 2006, the Jackson family launched White Rocket Wine Co. in Napa Valley to target the millennial generation of wine drinkers.

In April 2011 Jess Jackson died from cancer at the age of 81. His son-in-law, Don Hartford, had been CEO of the company. The company disclosed a succession plan in March 2011, announcing that president Rick Tigner would be transitioning into the position of CEO. Tigner was featured on the third season, second episode of Undercover Boss. Hartford and Barbara Banke oversee the family's interests on the board of directors.

In April 2024, together with La Crema, Kendall-Jackson was named the Official Wine Sponsor of USA Basketball.
