= Kelsey Bench-Lake County AVA =

American Viticultural Area in Lake County, California

Coordinates: 38.960352°N 122.845487°W

Kelsey Bench-Lake County
- Wine region
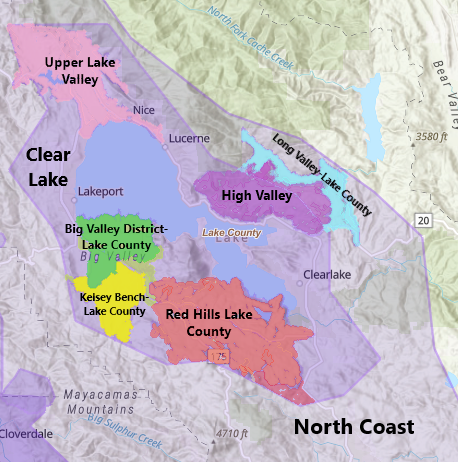
- Type: American Viticultural Area
- Year established: 2013
- Years of wine industry: 136
- Country: United States
- Part of: California, North Coast AVA, Lake County, Clear Lake AVA
- Other regions in California, North Coast AVA, Lake County, Clear Lake AVA: Big Valley District-Lake County AVA, Guenoc Valley AVA, High Valley AVA, Red Hills Lake County AVA, Upper Lake Valley AVA
- Growing season: 178-187 days
- Climate region: Region III
- Heat units: 3,225 GDD
- Precipitation (annual average): 18.75 to 39.2 in (476–996 mm)
- Soil conditions: Manzanita-Wappo-Forbesville, Phipps-Bally (alluvium), Millsholm-Skyhigh-Bressa (sandstone, shale and siltstone)
- Total area: 9,100 acres (14 sq mi)
- Size of planted vineyards: 900 acres (364 ha)
- No. of vineyards: 27
- Grapes produced: Barbera, Cabernet Franc, Cabernet Sauvignon, Chardonnay, Dolcetto, Merlot, Nebbiolo, Riesling, Sauvignon Blanc, Trousseau, Zinfandel
- No. of wineries: 1

Kelsey Bench-Lake County is an American Viticultural Area (AVA) located in Lake County, California on western region of Clear Lake. The appellation was established as the nation's 212th, the state's 119th and the county's eighth AVA on October 2, 2013 by the Alcohol and Tobacco Tax and Trade Bureau (TTB), Treasury after reviewing two petitions submitted by Terry Dereniuck, on behalf of the Big Valley District and Kelsey Bench Growers Committee, proposing the viticultural areas named "Big Valley District-Lake County" and "Kelsey Bench-Lake County." The petitions were submitted simultaneously as the two proposed areas share a common boundary, therefore, TTB combined both proposals into a single rulemaking document.
Kelsey Bench shares both the valley and the TTB ruling with the Big Valley District to the north. The regions' growers submitted the two petitions together, drawing a line between the valley floor and the higher elevations in the south.
The Kelsey Bench—Lake County viticultural area encompasses approximately 9,100 acres (14 sq mi) immediately south of the Big Valley—Lake County viticultural area. At the outset, there were 27 vineyards cultivating over 900 acres (364 ha) with one winery. The petition states that the distinguishing features of the viticultural area are geology, soils, climate, and topography identify this area as a unique winegrape growing area in Lake County, California.
At the outset, Kelsey Bench-Lake County appellation had one bonded winery and 27 vineyards cultivating approximately 900 acres (364 ha). Sauvignon Blanc, Chardonnay, Viognier and Riesling are the principal white grape varieties within Kelsey Bench and its neighbor the Big Valley District while Zinfandel, Merlot and Cabernet Franc varieties are the majority of red grape plantings. The higher elevations of Kelsey Bench mean that the climate here is warmer than in Big Valley District, although not so warm as Red Hills Lake County to the east. Cold air from the mountains drains off the benches into the valley below, extending the growing season by lessening the risk of frost in the early spring and fall. Vines are stressed by the strong winds that buffet the area, and photosynthesis, therefore ripening, is slowed as a result. This gives the grapes ample time to develop rich fruit complexity alongside vital acidity, leading to well-balanced wines. Kelsey Bench has predominantly rich, red, volcanic soils. The plant hardiness zone ranges from 8b to 9b.

== History ==
The Kelsey brothers, Andrew, Benjamin and Sam from Kentucky, were one of the first settlers of Lake County. They participated in the Bear Flag Revolt of 1846, which ended Mexican control of California and established the California Republic. Subsequently in 1847, Andrew Kelsey, Charles Stone, and E.D. Shirland acquired Salvador Vallejo's livestock near Clear Lake, composed of Texas longhorns and horses. It is unclear if they actually purchased grazing rights in Big Valley. Andrew Kelsey and Charles Stone forced the local Indians to build them a two-room, 15 by 40 feet (5 by 12 m) adobe home with a loft above, about three miles (5 km) from the south shore of the lake, and immediately west of Kelsey Creek, as well as a large cattle corral. The construction took two months and several hundred laborers, who were fed a steer per day. Tensions rose further between the settlers and the Indians over Vallejo's remaining cattle which were allegedly left to the indigenous tribe, as Kelsey and Stone ordered the vaqueros to round them up. The Indians, belonging to different tribes, Lil'eek Wappo and Eastern Pomo, were forced to reside and remain in two enclosed camps on each side of the creek. Historical accounts state that their treatment was harsh causing a great deal of resentment among the laborers. Kelsey and Stone were murdered by the natives in 1848.

The name "Kelsey Bench" is a combination of the Kelsey surname and "bench", the geological term used to describe the terraced landform that rises above the lower elevations of the valley to the north. The AVA boundaries cover a series of tectonically uplifted terraces in the southern half of a valley on the banks of Clear Lake. The Mayacamas mountains in the south and west separate the area from the southern end of Mendocino County, and the Mount Konocti volcano lies to the east. The Red Hills Lake County AVA is on the southeastern border of Kelsey Bench and when the appellation was formalized, the Red Hills boundaries were modified slightly to meet the Kelsey Bench boundaries.
Lake County and the Kelsey Bench–Lake County area has been a hub of agricultural and viticultural activity since it was originally settled in the mid 1800’s. Local history shows that many families settled around Kelsey Creek and other areas of the proposed Kelsey Bench area. As with other settlements in Lake County, agriculture was a primary source of income. Pears, walnuts, prunes, and winegrapes were among the crops grown on farms in this area. Old walnut orchards are still in production today along Bell Hill Road and Kelsey Creek.
Lake County history records three vineyards that were planted in the early 1900’s on properties located in the proposed Kelsey Bench–Lake County. Swiss-born John J. Staheli was among the first winegrowers in the area, where in 1905 he acquired a 25-acre (10 ha) Zinfandel vineyard property the previous owner, William Johnson, had planted, located a one and a half miles (2 km) south of Kelseyville on the west side of Kelsey Creek. Staheli erected a winery on site in 1910 which operated for a couple of years. Part of that vineyard eventually became the property of Arden "Burt" Harlan, who married Staheli's niece in 1965. In the same area, the Old Stake 1901 Vineyard, planted in 1901 and registered with the Historic Vineyard Society, features vines of Alicante Bouschet, Touriga Nacional, Zinfandel, Cinsault, Cabernet Sauvignon, Grenache, Roussanne and Perlette. Rosa d'Oro and Smiling Dogs Ranch are the only bonded wineries located within the boundaries of the AVA.

Local resident Barbara Schnabl was interviewed in researching the history of this area. She stated that her father, Fred Gross, worked in the Staheli vineyard from 1909 until he left the area to attend college in 1912 or 1913. In an account written by Ernest P. Penninou in 1955, it was noted that Staheli moved from Iowa to California in 1904 and in 1905 purchased the vineyard of William Johnson. In 1910, Mr. Staheli added a stone winery near the vineyard with a storage capacity of 4000 gallons. Although he closed the winery in 1912 due to the low price being paid for wine, he continued to farm the vineyard. The original property owned by Staheli is now divided into multiple smaller parcels. Wine grapes are still grown on some of the properties. Although much of the original vineyard has long since disappeared, some of the original zinfandel vines are still producing in a vineyard located on property owned by Burt Harlan, another long time Lake County resident. Penninou’s account also refers to a 35 acre vineyard owned by Fred Stokes located a mile and a half south of Mr. Staheli’s property on Kelsey Creek. In the history written by Henry Maudlin, this vineyard was said to be owned by Albert Brock Carey of Fulton and farmed by Fred Stokes. The vineyard was planted in 1910 and later pulled out in 1950.

The Catfish Vineyard located on Bell Hill Road was also planted in 1901. This vineyard is still in commercial operation and owned by Steele Wines. According to Steele Wines, “Catfish Vineyard is truly an old-timer, planted in 1901. The vineyard is located on the Bell Hill bench of Lake County just south of Kelseyville. The vines are head pruned and stand on their own roots. Steele Wines purchased the vineyard in 2000 and we have been working to rehabilitate the old vines since that time. We have pruned the vines back so that each vine has fewer shoots and therefore fewer grape bunches and we have planted new vines where the 100-year-old vines have expired. A vintage consuming process but well worth the effort. The small, concentrated berries from this century-old vineyard offer just that, concentrated flavors. Catfish Vineyard Zinfandel is actually a field blend of a number of varieties, including small amounts of Carignan, Alicante Bouche, Cabernet, and several other varieties – even some white grapes. Having more than one variety assured the old-time vintners that they would have some grapes to harvest regardless of the spring frosts or autumn storms. The grapes from Catfish are not separated; the wine is vinified just as it grows. The vineyard was planted during the influx of Mediterranean immigrants into Northern California at the turn of the 20th Century."

Vineyards and viticulture disappeared in the County with Prohibition, with pears and walnuts becoming the most predominant crops. In the early to mid 60’s, grapes were planted in the area once again. Nova Wine and Grape Brokers states that their old vine Zinfandel vineyard located on Gold Dust and Staheli Drives was planted in 1960. Vineyards continued to be planted in this area in the 1970’s and beyond. Early vineyards used root stock that was not phylloxera resistant and have been replaced since the original planting. Both red and white grape varieties have been planted in the area although as noted in an article from Wine Business Monthly, "The Kelseyville Bench is a distinct area 1,600 feet (490 m) above sea level, better for red grapes." The current agricultural landscape of the Kelsey Bench is predominantly walnuts and grapes, with Cabernet Sauvignon, Merlot, and Zinfandel being the most planted red varieties.

== Terroir ==
=== Topography ===
The topography of the Kelsey Bench—Lake County viticultural area is composed of uplifted dissected terraces or benches, plateaus, and gently rolling hills, with elevations ranging from 1,400 feet (427 m) at the northern boundary to 1,600 feet (488 m) near the southern boundary. The topography was formed over time by the movement of the faults beneath the viticultural area, which raised the ground to form the benches and hills. The continued uplifting of the terrain due to fault movement has been recorded as recently as 1906, when a major earthquake along the San Andreas Fault altered the Kelseyville Formation that underlies the viticultural area, uplifting and dissecting portions along the southeastern portion of the viticultural area. The slopes and terraces allow cool air to drain away from the viticultural area at night and into the lower elevations of the neighboring Big Valley District—Lake County viticultural area. Although cool air does drain into the Kelsey Bench—Lake County viticultural area from the higher elevations of the surrounding Mayacmas Mountains and Red Hills, most of the cool air does not pool in the viticultural area but instead continues to drain into the even lower elevations of the Big Valley District—Lake County viticultural area. Because most of the cool nighttime air does not settle in the slopes and benches of the Kelsey Bench—Lake County viticultural area, the frost damage to vines and fruit in the early spring and fall is reduced. As evidence of the reduced frost within the Kelsey Bench—Lake County viticultural area, the petitioner provided testimony from the University of California Viticulture and Plant Science Advisor for Mendocino and Lake Counties. The advisor states that due to the reduced frost within the Kelsey Bench—Lake County viticultural area, many vineyards do not have overhead sprinklers for frost protection, but such protection "is a necessity" for vineyards in the Big Valley District—Lake County viticultural area.

=== Climate ===
The petition to establish the Kelsey Bench—Lake County viticultural area included information on the wind, growing degree days (GDD), frost-free days, and precipitation for the viticultural area. Climate data was not available for the Mayacmas Mountains region to the south and west of the viticultural area. The petition states that there is only one official weather station located within the Kelsey Bench—Lake County viticultural area, on the Silva Ranch in the northern portion of the viticultural area. However, only partial wind data from 2011 was available at the time the petition was submitted. Therefore, the petition included testimony from growers concerning the winds within the viticultural area and contrasting them to the winds within the Big Valley District—Lake County viticultural area. The petition included testimony from the owner of Eutenier Ranches, who has vineyards both within the Kelsey Bench—Lake County viticultural area and in the Big Valley District—Lake County viticultural area to the north. The owner notes that the summer winds in the vineyard in the Kelsey Bench—Lake County viticultural area can become so strong that the stomata on the grape leaves close, reducing photosynthesis and delaying the ripening of fruit. As a result, his grapes within the Kelsey Bench—Lake County viticultural area usually have a later harvest date than those in his vineyard within the Big Valley District—Lake County viticultural area, even though both vineyards are planted with the same variety of grapes. A second grower who had resided at the Silva Ranch within the Kelsey Bench—Lake County viticultural area for six years and who also had vineyards within the Big Valley District—Lake County viticultural area also provided testimony. This grower confirms the strong winds within the Kelsey Bench—Lake County viticultural area. The grower also notes that the winds within the Kelsey Bench—Lake County viticultural area begin earlier in the day than within the Big Valley District—Lake County viticultural area. The grower notes that he could have workers spraying crops on his property in the Big Valley District—Lake County viticultural area in the late morning, whereas the winds would already be too strong in the Kelsey Bench—Lake County viticultural area to spray crops safely and effectively.

The temperatures in the Kelsey Bench—Lake County viticultural area are generally warmer than those of the Big Valley District—Lake County viticultural area to the north and cooler than those of the existing Red Hills Lake County viticultural area to the east. The petition states that current growing GDD data is not available from the one official weather station located within the Kelsey Bench-Lake County viticultural area. However, the petition did include a discussion of GDD totals from Arkley Vineyards for the period from 1999—2002. Arkley Vineyards is located within the Kelsey Bench-Lake County viticultural area. According to the petition, the average annual GDD total for Arkley Vineyards was 3,225, which is greater than the 3,037 average annual GDD total for the Big Valley District-Lake County viticultural area. To the east in the established Red Hills Lake County viticultural area, the average GDD total from the three weather stations for the period from 2005 to 2010 was 3,584. In comparison to the Big Valley District-Lake County viticultural area, the Kelsey Bench-Lake County viticultural area has warmer daytime temperatures and a longer frost-free period. Temperature data was collected from the Silva Ranch weather station throughout 2011 and compared to data from weather stations within the Big Valley District-Lake County viticultural area. The data shows that each month had a minimum of 13 days where temperatures within the Kelsey Bench—Lake County viticultural area were higher than within the Big Valley District—Lake County viticultural area, for a total of 283 days with warmer temperatures. With respect to the frost-free period, the petition gathered temperature data from the Silva Ranch weather station and from three weather stations within the Big Valley District—Lake County viticultural area during 2011. The table below shows the total number of frost-free days as well as the earliest freeze dates for each weather station. The Kelsey Bench—Lake County viticultural area petition did not include 2011 frost data from the region to the east, within the established Red Hills Lake County viticultural area. However, information from 2008 and 2009 was provided in the Big Valley District—Lake County petition and was described in the temperature section of the Big Valley District-Lake County viticultural area discussion portion of this document. That information showed the Red Hills area has an average of 227 frost-free days, longer than that of the Kelsey Bench-Lake County viticultural area. The Red Hills region also averaged a later first frost date than the Kelsey Bench—Lake County viticultural area. The length of the frost-free period within the Kelsey Bench-dLake County viticultural area affects the grape varieties grown. According to the petition, the temperatures make the viticultural area suitable for growing red varieties such as Merlot, Cabernet Sauvignon, and Zinfandel. The longer growing season also provides a longer time for the grapes to ripen, which can compensate for the slower ripening conditions that the windy conditions within the viticultural area create.

Precipitation levels in the Kelsey Bench—Lake County viticultural area are generally greater that those within the Big Valley District—Lake County viticultural area. Annual precipitation amounts were measured by two property owners within the Kelsey Bench—Lake County viticultural area and three weather stations within the Big Valley District—Lake County viticultural area. Each data collection period began on July 1 and ended on June 30 of the following year.

=== Geology ===
Three faults that are part of the San Andreas Fault system run beneath the Kelsey Bench—Lake County viticultural area: The Big Valley Fault, the Wight Way Fault, and the Adobe Creek Fault. At various times throughout history, the movement of these three faults, along with the San Andreas Fault, has uplifted the region and contributed to the terraced landscape within the viticultural area. The terraces and benches of the viticultural area reduce the risk of frost within the viticultural area because cold air drains off the terraces at night and into the lower, flatter valley to the north, outside the viticultural area. The Kelseyville Formation is a major geological feature of the Kelsey Bench—Lake County viticultural area. The formation was created during the middle Pleistocene era, between approximately 780,000 and 126,000 years ago, and consists mainly of sandstone, siltstone, and mudstone. Below the formation are rocks of the Franciscan Complex and flows of the Clear Lake volcanic field; above the formation are Quaternary terrace deposits. The Kelseyville Formation contains two volcanic ash aquifers which serve as the water resources of the area. The "ash" consists of angular fragments of volcanic rock ranging from the size of a grain of sand to the size of pea gravel. These fragments are quite permeable and allow water from stream courses and saturated confining strata to leak into and recharge the aquifers, providing a source of water for irrigating the vineyards within the viticultural area. To the north of the Kelsey Bench—Lake County viticultural area is the Big Valley District—Lake County viticultural area. The geology of the Big Valley District—Lake County viticultural area consists of two major geological units — the Franciscan Complex and the Great Valley sequence. The Big Valley, Wight Way, and Adobe Creek Faults also run beneath the Big Valley District—Lake County viticultural area, where the movement of the faults over the ages has gently tilted the valley downward towards Clear Lake. To the east and northeast of the Kelsey Bench—Lake County viticultural area are Mount Konocti and the established Red Hills Lake County viticultural area. Both regions are part of the Clear Lake Volcanics, formed in the middle Pliocene Epoch, and have rocks composed of basalt, rhyolite, and other volcanic materials. The Mayacmas Mountains lie to the south and west of the Kelsey Bench—Lake County viticultural area. The mountain range is composed of rock from the Mesozoic era that is much older than the Kelseyville Formation. The rocks consist mainly of sandstone, conglomerate, and argillite, with smaller amounts of greenstone, chert, limestone, and blueschist.

=== Soils ===
The soils of the Kelsey Bench—Lake County viticultural area were shaped over time by the forces of geology, water, and weather. Three general soil map units are found extensively within the viticultural area: the Manzanita—Wappo—Forbesville unit (MWF), which accounts for approximately 31% of the soils within the viticultural area; the Phipps—Bally unit (PB), which accounts for approximately 26% of the soils; and the Millsholm—Skyhigh—Bressa (MSB) unit, which comprises approximately 14% of the soils. MWF and PB soils are very deep and well drained and formed in alluvium. MSB soils are shallow to moderately deep and are formed from sandstone, shale, and siltstone. Most of the vineyards within the proposed viticultural area are planted on soils of the MWF general soil map unit, a fact the petition attributes to the relatively milder slopes of soils associated with this unit, as well as the greater presence of the MWF soils within the viticultural area. MWF soils are acidic, with pH levels between 5.0 and 6.5. The acidity in the soils allows for nutrient uptake by the vines but is low enough to prevent the vines from absorbing nutrients at levels that could become damaging to the plant. Clay accumulates at depths of 16 to 70 inches (406–1,778 mm), which limits root depth and prevents vines from growing too vigorously. MWF soils are low in fertility, which, according to the petition, provides lean conditions that result in grapes with high concentrations of flavor, although the yields may be lower than those of vineyards planted on more fertile soil. To the north, in the Big Valley District—Lake County viticultural area, 75 percent of the soils are of the Cole clay loam, Clear Lake clay, and Still loam series. By contrast, these soil series comprise only 10 percent of the Kelsey Bench—Lake County viticultural area soils. The MWF, MSB, and PB soils that comprise over 70 percent of the Kelsey Bench—Lake County viticultural area soils are not found in the area to the north. Additionally, the soils in the area to the north are slightly less acidic than those within the Kelsey Bench—Lake County viticultural area. To the east, the soils of the established Red Hills Lake County viticultural area are composed of Glenview—Bottlerock—Arrowhead, Konocti—Benridge, and Collayomi—Aiken soil types. These soils are formed from volcanic materials such as andesite, basalt, dacite, and pyroclastic tuff and have significant gravel content. To the south and west, the soils of the Mayacmas Mountains are in the Maymen—Etsel and Henneke—Okiota—Montara general soil map units. These soils are characterized by shallow depths and moderate to severe erosion potential. The Maymen—Etsel soils are derived from graywackes and sandstone while the Henneke—Okiota—Montara soils are predominately derived from weathered serpentine rock.
