= High Valley AVA =

American Viticultural Area in Lake County, California

Coordinates: 39.0480°N 122.7073°W

High Valley
- Wine region
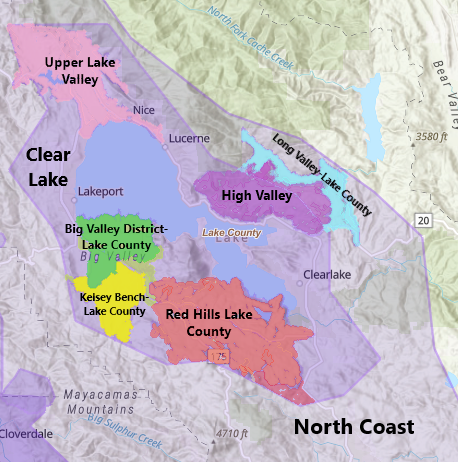
- Type: American Viticultural Area
- Year established: 2005
- Country: United States
- Part of: California, North Coast AVA, Lake County, Clear Lake AVA
- Other regions in California, North Coast AVA, Lake County, Clear Lake AVA: Big Valley District-Lake County AVA, Kelsey Bench-Lake County AVA, Long Valley-Lake County AVA, Red Hills Lake County AVA, Upper Lake Valley AVA
- Growing season: 196 days
- Climate region: Region II-IV
- Heat units: 2927-3917 GDD
- Precipitation (annual average): 18 to 35 inches (457–889 mm)
- Total area: 14,000 acres (22 sq mi)
- Size of planted vineyards: 1,000 acres (400 ha)
- No. of vineyards: 6
- Grapes produced: Cabernet Franc, Chardonnay, Cabernet Sauvignon, Cinsault, Gewurztraminer, Grenache, Merlot, Mourvedre / Mataro, Petit Verdot, Petite Sirah, Pinot Gris / Grigio, Pinot Noir, Riesling, Sauvignon Blanc, Semillon, Syrah /Shiraz, Zinfandel
- No. of wineries: 6

High Valley is an American Viticultural Area (AVA) located in the eastern part of Lake County, California adjacent to the eastern shoreline of Clear Lake. It was established as the nation's 163rd, the state's 92nd and county’s sixth appellation on July 1, 2005 by the Alcohol and Tobacco Tax and Trade Bureau (TTB), Treasury after reviewing the petition submitted by Kevin Robinson of the Brassfield Estate, on behalf of the High Valley AVA Committee, local vintners and growers, proposing a viticultural area in Lake County named “High Valley."

‘High Valley’’ is the officially recognized name of the elongated bowl-shaped valley encompassed by the viticultural area, as shown on the Clearlake Oaks, California, USGS Quadrangle map. True to its name, the valley is situated on higher elevations ranging from 1,600 feet (488 m) to 3,000 feet (914 m), but it actually encompasses two distinct growing regions, the valley floor and the hillsides. The valley itself is a 9-mile long (14 km) and 3-mile wide (5 km) landform, with an east–west orientation unusual in the California Coastal Range, a result of volcanic activity of Round Mountain, a dormant volcanic cinder cone at the eastern end of the valley. The AVA encompasses 15,000 acres (23 sq mi), and about 700 acres (280 ha) under vine. Most are relatively new, but within the area are some of the oldest vines in California. There are 15 struggling Zinfandel and Muscat vines planted by the Ogulin family, which brought them from Slovenia around 1875. Since Slovenia borders Croatia, where cousins of Zinfandel vines are found, this is significance in the history of California Zinfandel. The old vines were stables before Prohibition since Lake County was producing reputable wines before the vineyards were uprooted and replaced with other crops.

Significant vineyards in the AVA include Brassfield Estate Winery, whose estate sits on the valley floor and Shannon Family of Wines. The plant hardiness zone ranges from 8b to 9b.

== History ==
The High Valley area was first settled by Native American Indian descendants of the Pomo tribes, the Elam and Kamdots. The peaceful tribes lived on opposite ends of High Valley and referred to it as "kas". Numerous sites found on steep rock ledges on the southern and western slopes of High Valley were winter high ground camps. This area was also an important transportation route between lake shore tribes and tribes in neighboring Long Valley to the north and Cache Creek to the east. An essential food supply of acorns, wild oats, wild game including deer, rabbit, bear, and quail could be found throughout the valley and surrounding hills.

High Valley remained Pomo territory until the arrival of European settlers in the 1850s. Hemy L. Wildegrube was the first white man to settle in High Valley. In 1856 at the age of 21 he settled in what is now Upper Lake and established its first general store. Three years later in 1859 he purchased 160 acres (65 ha) in High Valley after selling his portion of what is now the town of Lucerne to his partner.

Soon after Wildegrube settled in High Valley other settlers began to arrive. At the peak of the 1850s about a dozen small ranches occupied the valley forcing most of the Pomo Indian tribes out of the valley and up into the hillsides and ridges. High Valley Ridge was once the dividing line between Lake and Colusa Counties until 1868 when Long Valley and Indian Valley were added to Lake County moving the boundary further north. Over the next several decades the valley contained a schoolhouse, post office and a stagecoach stop that provided essential supplies and rest to the many travelers utilizing High Valley as a transportation route between Upper Lake and Sacramento. Before their steep climb up High Valley Ridge horses were changed in High Valley at the "Foutch Stage Station" for visitors from San Francisco on their way to the mineral baths at Bartlett Springs.

The history of grape and wine production in Lake County is fairly dramatic. The County boasted one of the largest growing areas in California until Prohibition replaced the vineyards with pears, walnuts, prunes, green beans and other crops. However, a few of these old-vine vineyards still exist in a few locations throughout parts of the County. Testimony to this is a derelict vineyard of with about 25 "centennial vines" of perhaps Zinfandel variety on a southeast ridge above High Valley at the Ogulin Ranch.

Since the late 1800s the area has witnessed little change. Ranching still exists along the valley floor although vineyards now occupy a large portion of the moderate to steep slopes, and to a lesser degree, the valley floor to the west. There were nearly 1,000 vineyard acres (405 ha) producing or are under development during the early 2000s. Many wineries in the North Coast over the past several years have created vintages using Upper Lake fruit displaying extraordinary qualities. As a result of the high quality wines coming from the High Valley area several local winery projects started construction or were in the planning phase.

== Terroir ==
=== Topography ===
High Valley is an elongated, bowl-shaped basin, which is largely enclosed and topographically isolated from surrounding regions by high surrounding mountain ridges. As shown on USGS maps, the valley floor is generally between 1,700 and 1,800 feet (518–549 m) in elevation, while, to the north, High Valley Ridge rises to over 3,000 feet (914 m). To the east, south, and west, the surrounding ridges average between 2,200 and 2,400 feet (671–732 m) in elevation. The lowest elevation within the High Valley viticultural area is at the 1,600-foot (488 m) contour line, which forms part of the area’s southern boundary. The only drainage outlet from High Valley is Schindler Creek, which flows south through a gap in the mountain ridge between the valley and Clear Lake on the viticultural area’s southern side. In addition to its topographic isolation, High Valley has an east and west orientation, which is rarely found in the northern Californian coastal range. This orientation contributes to some of the distinctive climatic features of the High Valley area.

=== Climate ===
High Valley viticultural area’s climate is cooler than the surrounding viticultural areas of Lake County, according to weather station data collected from several locations within the High Valley viticultural area, including vineyards on the area’s southeastern and western mountain ridges, and on the eastern and western portions of the valley floor. The Winkler degree-day heat summation method of climate classification classifies High Valley as a Region 3 climate and occasionally as a cooler Region 2, depending upon the year and a vineyard’s location within the area. (Each degree of a day’s mean temperature that is above 50 degrees F, which is the minimum temperature required for grapevine growth, is counted as one degree day. Amber Knolls, a grape-growing region approximately five miles (8 km) west of High Valley’s boundary line, has consistently warmer growing season temperatures, and is frequently a Region 4 climate in the degree-day classification system. High Valley’s cool growing climate results from the valley’s east-west orientation, the surrounding ridge topography, and the perpetual "wind machine" generated from the Clear Lake basin. The high east-west ridges above the valley trap the cooling afternoon breezes as they blow in from the Clear Lake basin. Also, the cooling mountain-valley winds from the higher northern elevations of the Mendocino National Forest drift down the ridges to the valley floor. The High Valley area is one of the coolest grape-growing regions in Lake County, with a frost season that frequently extends into June. The grape varietals planted in the High Valley area reflect this cooler and shorter growing season. The petition noted the wide variation in annual precipitation in High Valley between the years 2000 and May 2003, and did not provide extensive rainfall data to show it as a distinguishing viticultural factor. The High Valley area received 18 inches (457 mm) of precipitation in both 2000 and 2001, 29 inches (737 mm) in 2002, 39 inches (991 mm) and 35 inches (889 mm) from January through May 2003. In recent years, other Lake County grape-growing regions received more precipitation than the High Valley viticultural area, and the petition listed the following average precipitation amounts: Red Hills, 24 to 40 inches (610–1,016 mm); Kelseyville, 46 inches (1,168 mm); and the Putah Creek basin, 47 inches (1,194 mm).

=== Geology ===
Originally a small east-west trending fault basin with drainage to the east, volcanic activity altered High Valley’s shape and created a series of high ridges along its eastern side, forming the valley’s largely enclosed basin and redirecting the valley’s drainage southward into Clear Lake. This volcanic activity also created Tule Lake, a small lake on the valley’s central floor, as well as Round Mountain, once an active volcanic cinder cone rising 400 feet (122 m) above the northern valley floor. The dominant rock types in the proposed High Valley viticultural area are Jurassic sedimentary rocks of the Franciscan Complex, basalt flows, and Quaternary volcanic deposits. The Franciscan Complex forms the base material and most of the exposed rock in the southern ridges and western portions of High Valley, while the Quaternary volcanics overlay the basalts found throughout the valley’s eastern half. Round Mountain is a prominent High Valley feature of the Quaternary volcanics.

=== Soils ===
The two primary soil types of High Valley are weathered volcanic residue and Franciscan Complex weathered sandstone, shale, or phyllitic rocks. The east side of the area contains soils derived primarily from volcanics, while the west side contains soils from Jurassic to Cretaceous sedimentary and phyllitic source material. The four basic soil formations within the High Valley viticultural area include: (1) The Franciscan Hills along the area’s southern and western boundaries, (2) the alluvial basin of High Valley, (3) the alluvial terrace along the southeast boundary, and (4) the volcanic ridges along the area’s northeastern boundary near Round Mountain.
Wolfcreek loam soil, a very deep well-drained clay to sandy loam with moderately slow permeability, covers most of the High Valley floor. The eastern half of the High Valley viticultural area contains Konocti variants, Konocti, Hambright, Benridge, and Sodabay Series soils. The Maymen, Hopland, and Mayacama Series soils dominate the southeast region of the High Valley area. The western hills and ridges contain primarily Millsholm, Bressa, Hopland, Estel, and Maymen Series soils. While the High Valley soils are permeable in mild and moderately-warm to warm temperatures, soils in the nearby Big Valley allow only moderately-warm to warm temperature permeation. The soils of High Valley’s slopes and ridges permit excellent drainage, unlike Big Valley’s less favorable soil drainage characteristics. Further, the vine-planted slopes of the High Valley area incline about 30 percent, comparatively steeper than the 0 to 2 percent incline of Big Valley Vineyards.

== Viticulture ==
None of the unique differences of the High Valley AVA would be as fascinating or as significant if the quality of the grapes and resulting wines were just of average quality. Much of Lake County's reputation for growing grapes has been mired in mediocrity. Considering that the majority of viticulture has taken place in Big Valley on heavy, poorly drained soils, its not surprising that Lake County grapes, historically, get the lowest average price over any other North Coast County. The red wines from the Big Valley area generally tend to be lighter, simpler, lacking tannic structure and concentration of fruit when compared to the growing conditions in the higher, mountainous soils of Lake County.
The vineyards of High Valley tend to yield lighter than average crops, and thus produce a red wine of higher intensity. Lower yields and better quality wines from shallow, well-drained hillsides, and cooler well-drained gravelly loams increases the average Lake County price for a particular red grape varietal in the proposed AVA by as much as 30% or more. Many large and small wineries throughout Napa and Sonoma North look to grapes from the High Valley area to improve their North Coast blends even over grape sources in their own appellation.
