= North Coast AVA =

American Viticultural Area in California

Coordinates: 38°46′21″N 122°53′55″W

North Coast
- Wine region
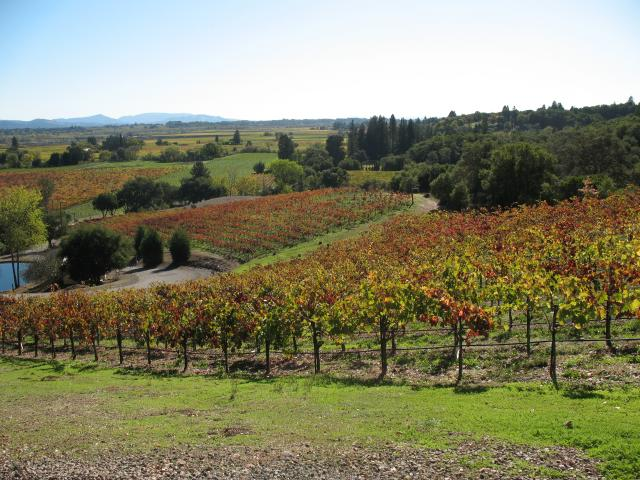
- Sonoma County vineyards
- Type: American Viticultural Area
- Year established: 1983
- Years of wine industry: 203
- Country: United States
- Part of: California, Lake County, Marin County, Mendocino County, Napa County, Sonoma County, Solano County
- Sub-regions: List of North Coast AVAs
- Climate region: Region I-IV
- Heat units: 2,757 GDD units
- Precipitation (annual average): 24.8 to 62.2 in (630–1,580 mm)
- Total area: 3 million acres (4,700 sq mi)
- Grapes produced: Barbera, Cabernet Franc, Cabernet Sauvignon, Carignane, Chardonnay, Dolcetto, Gamay noir, Gewurztraminer, Lagrein, Malbec, Merlot, Muscat Canelli, Petit Verdot, Petite Sirah, Pinot Meunier, Pinot noir, Sangiovese, Sauvignon blanc, Semillon, Syrah, Valdiguie, Verdelho, Viognier, Zinfandel
- No. of wineries: 1,337

North Coast is an American Viticultural Area (AVA) in the state of California that encompasses grape-growing regions in six counties located north of San Francisco: Lake, Marin, Mendocino, Napa, Sonoma, and Solano. County names in the United States automatically qualify as legal appellations of origin for wine produced from grapes grown in that county and do not require registration with the Alcohol and Tobacco Tax and Trade Bureau (TTB) of the Treasury Department.

The multi-county wine appellation was established as the nation's 42^{nd} and the state's 27^{th} AVA on September 24, 1983 by the Bureau of Alcohol, Tobacco and Firearms (ATF), Treasury after reviewing the petition submitted by the California North Coast Grape Growers Association (CNCGGA) proposing a viticultural area encompassing six Northern Californian counties known as "North Coast."
This vast appellation encompasses over 3 million acres (4,700 sq mi) and includes many smaller sub-appellations that all share the common trait of weather affected by the fog and breezes from the Pacific Ocean. The plant hardiness zones range from 8a to 10b.

== History ==
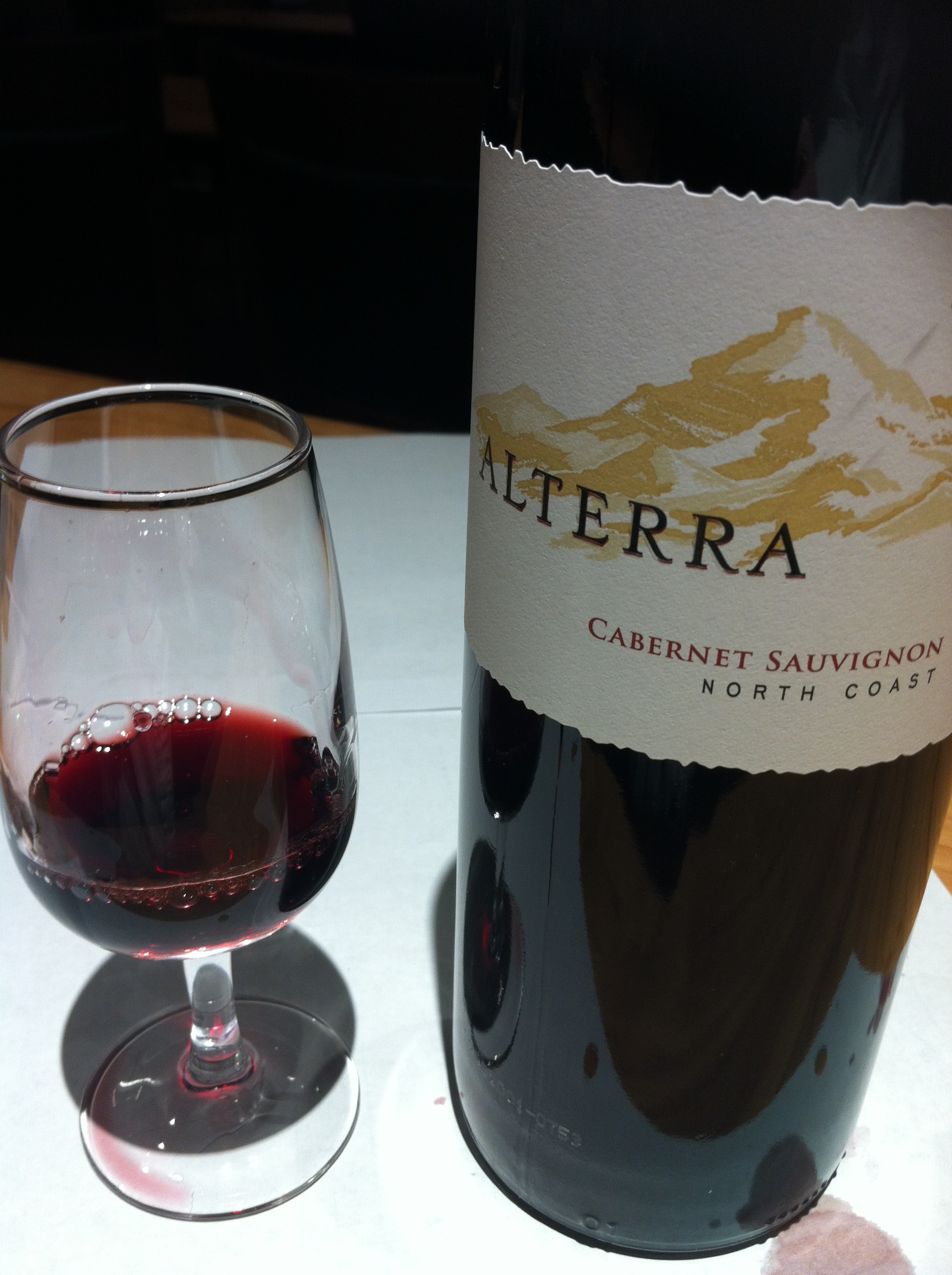
North Coast AVA Cabernet Sauvignon

William F. Heintz, a wine historian testifying on behalf of the CNCGGA, presented evidence of the use of the term North Coast in describing a region in California. He testified that "Northern Coast Range" was first used in 1884 in a University of California bulletin describing soil analyses from Napa, Solano and Yolo Counties. In 1888, John Muir's book Picturesque California contained a chapter entitled "The Foothill Range of the Northern Coast Range: Sonoma, Napa and Solano Counties." Heintz also cited a book written by Charles Aiken in 1903 entitled California Today. In his book Aiken defines the phrase "North Coast" to mean the counties lying adjacent to the waters of the San Francisco Bay and to the border of Oregon. Chapter V, The North Coast Counties, contains a description of the counties of Napa, Sonoma, Lake, Mendocino, Humboldt, Del Norte, Trinity, and Marin. Heintz's testimony then centered on defining North Coast as a grape-growing region. He noted that grape production in Lake, Solano and Marin Counties sharply declined after 1930, and that by 1950 only Napa, Sonoma and Mendocino Counties were major wine producing counties of the North Coast. These three counties produced 98% of all wine grapes produced in the North Coast in 1969, and over 95% of the grapes in 1976. Heintz also pointed out how the concept of a North Coast winegrowing district evolved from the Wine & Vines yearbook in 1940 which pictured a map showing seven viticultural districts in California including Napa-Solano, and Sonoma-Mendocino. The Wine Institute's Story of Wine booklet included these same districts. The Wine Institute also prepared production statistics for the wine industry. These statistics published in the Wine Press magazine showed "Mendocino, Napa and Sonoma" as one of the five reporting districts. Finally, Heintz cited the 1975 New York Times Book of Wine as expressly restricting North Coast to Napa Sonoma and Mendocino Counties. The California North Coast Grape Growers Association also pointed to their own incorporation in 1964, as an association of grape growers located in the three-county area, and to their registered trademark "North Coast" as further evidence that North Coast refers only to Napa, Sonoma, and Mendocino Counties. CNCGGA noted that in 1974, ATF recognized the term "North Coast" to mean the counties of Napa, Sonoma, and Mendocino. Today, some wineries in California use North Coast as an appellation of origin on labels for wine made with grapes grown in these three counties.

Charles L. Sullivan, a historian, testified on behalf of the Lake County Wine Producers. He presented evidence that Lake County was grouped with Mendocino County as a wine producing region in the 1880s, and was later also grouped with Napa and Sonoma Counties. However, he stated that North Coast was a term not used before Prohibition, and only began to be used following Repeal. He cited Horatio Stoll, the founder and original publisher of Wines & Vines as listing the northern counties of the Coast Region as Marin, Napa, Sonoma, Lake, Mendocino, Solano, Humboldt and Trinity. In 1931 in The Grape Districts of California, Stoll described the Coast Region as being one of "valleys between the coast ranges running parallel to the Pacific Ocean shore and the lower slopes of these ranges…" Sullivan also cited numerous published works and statistical data, which since 1934 have included Lake County with other North Coast counties. Wine growers from both Lake and Solano Counties noted that the vast majority of their grapes are shipped to wineries in Napa, Sonoma, or Mendocino Counties for crushing and were considered the same as other North Coast grapes. They further stated that the term North Coast as an appellation of origin on wine is of recent origin dating back only to 1967, and that some Solano and Lake County grapes were labeled as North Coast wines prior to ATF's letter to the CNCGGA in 1974.

== Appellations ==
The boundary of the North Coast AVA encompasses many smaller wine appellations, which generally have higher consumer appeal and therefore higher commercial value. Wine produced primarily from grapes grown in any one of these appellations will likely specifically carry the sub-appellation on its bottle labels rather than the general North Coast designation. The North Coast AVA designation is primarily used on vintages created by blending wines from several counties or AVAs.

=== Counties ===
Because U.S. county names automatically qualify as legal appellations of origin for wine, the following appellations do not require registration with the Alcohol and Tobacco Tax and Trade Bureau:

- Lake County
- Marin County
- Mendocino County
- Napa County
- Solano County
- Sonoma County

=== American Viticultural Areas ===
Established AVAs contained within North Coast boundaries (as of 2024):

- Alexander Valley AVA
- Anderson Valley AVA
- Atlas Peak AVA
- Big Valley District-Lake County AVA
- Benmore Valley AVA
- Bennett Valley AVA
- Calistoga AVA
- Chalk Hill AVA
- Chiles Valley AVA
- Clear Lake AVA
- Cole Ranch AVA
- Coombsville AVA
- Covelo AVA
- Crystal Springs of Napa Valley AVA
- Diamond Mountain District AVA
- Dos Rios AVA
- Dry Creek Valley AVA
- Eagle Peak Mendocino County AVA
- Fort Ross-Seaview AVA
- Fountaingrove District AVA
- Green Valley of Russian River Valley AVA
- Guenoc Valley AVA
- High Valley AVA
- Howell Mountain AVA
- Kelsey Bench-Lake County AVA
- Knights Valley AVA
- Long Valley-Lake County AVA
- Los Carneros AVA
- McDowell Valley AVA
- Mendocino AVA
- Mendocino Ridge AVA
- Moon Mountain District AVA
- Mt. Veeder AVA
- Napa Valley AVA
- Northern Sonoma AVA
- Oak Knoll District of Napa Valley AVA
- Oakville AVA
- Petaluma Gap AVA
- Pine Mountain-Cloverdale Peak AVA
- Potter Valley AVA
- Red Hills Lake County AVA
- Redwood Valley AVA
- Rockpile AVA
- Russian River Valley AVA
- Rutherford AVA
- Solano County Green Valley AVA
- Sonoma Coast AVA
- Sonoma Mountain AVA
- Sonoma Valley AVA
- Spring Mountain District AVA
- St. Helena AVA
- Stags Leap District AVA
- Suisun Valley AVA
- Upper Lake Valley AVA
- West Sonoma Coast AVA
- Wild Horse Valley AVA
- Yorkville Highlands AVA
- Yountville AVA

== See also ==
- Wine Country
