= Big Valley District-Lake County AVA =

American Viticultural Area in Lake County, California

Coordinates: 38.982643°N 122.8538322°W

Big Valley District-Lake County
- Wine region
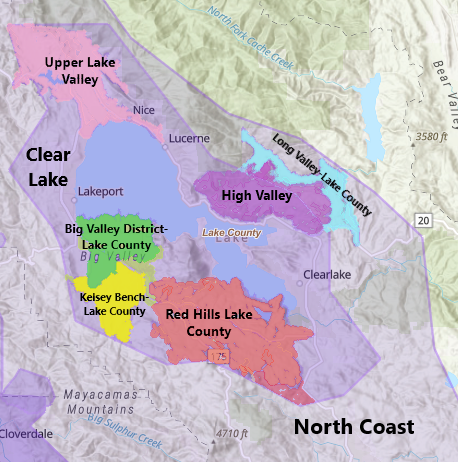
- Type: American Viticultural Area
- Year established: 2013
- Years of wine industry: 146
- Country: United States
- Part of: California, North Coast AVA, Lake County, Clear Lake AVA
- Other regions in California, North Coast AVA, Lake County, Clear Lake AVA: Guenoc Valley AVA, High Valley AVA, Kelsey Bench-Lake County AVA, Red Hills Lake County AVA, Upper Lake Valley AVA
- Growing season: 153-166 days
- Climate region: Region II-III
- Heat units: 3,037 GDD
- Precipitation (annual average): 20.6 in (523 mm)
- Soil conditions: alluvial of clay and loam
- Total area: 11,214 acres (18 sq mi)
- Size of planted vineyards: 1,800 acres (728 ha)
- No. of vineyards: 43
- Grapes produced: Cabernet Franc, Chardonnay, Merlot, Petite Sirah, Riesling, Sauvignon Blanc, Viognier, Zinfandel
- No. of wineries: 6

Big Valley District-Lake County is an American Viticultural Area (AVA) located in central Lake County, California on the western shoreline of Clear Lake encompassing the flatter half of the valley north of Kelseyville. The appellation was established as the nation's 210th, the state's 117th and the county's seventh AVA on October 2, 2013 by the Alcohol and Tobacco Tax and Trade Bureau (TTB), Treasury after reviewing two petitions submitted by Terry Dereniuck, on behalf of the Big Valley District and Kelsey Bench Growers Committee, proposing two viticultural areas named "Big Valley District-Lake County" and "Kelsey Bench-Lake County." The petitions were submitted simultaneously as the two proposed areas share a common boundary, therefore, TTB combined both proposals into a single rulemaking document.
Big Valley District shares both the valley and the TTB ruling with Kelsey Bench to the south. The regions' growers submitted the two petitions together, drawing a line between the valley floor and the higher elevations in the south.
At the outset, Big Valley District-Lake County had 6 bonded wineries and 43 vineyards cultivating approximately 1,800 acres (728 ha) of wine grapes. Kelsey Bench-Lake County appellation has one bonded winery and 27 vineyards cultivating approximately 900 acres (364 ha). Sauvignon Blanc, Chardonnay, Viognier and Riesling are the principal white grape varieties within Kelsey Bench and its neighbor the Big Valley District while Zinfandel, Merlot and Cabernet Franc varieties are the majority of red grape plantings in the area.

Big Valley District is in a large valley near Clear Lake, the Mayacamas mountain range and the Mount Konocti volcano. The AVA is in the less hilly area near Kelseyville; the hillier areas are part of the Kelsey Bench. Big Valley is a structural basin that is part of the larger Clear Lake basin. Sauvignon Blanc makes up the majority of the region's plantings in addition to Zinfandel and Cabernet Franc. The plant hardiness zone ranges from 8b to 9a.

== History ==
The name "Big Valley" has been associated with the proposed viticultural area since the mid-19th Century, appearing in the 1870 Federal Census as a district within Lake County, California. As evidence of the usage of the proposed name, the petitioner referenced historical account of the settlement of Napa and Lake Counties, published in 1881, which notes that "Big Valley is the garden spot of Lake County," and that "small fruits and berries thrive her also, as do grapes." The Big Valley is home to the Big Valley Band of the Pomo Indians. According to a letter to the Lake County Record-Bee, Big Valley tribal members are descendants of the Xa-Ben-Na-Po Band of Pomo Indians that historically have inhabited the Clear Lake area for over 11,800 years. The Big Valley Band was given the property for Big Valley Rancheria that is located on the site that was initially established as a Catholic Mission. The Big Valley Rancheria is located within the geographic area of the proposed appellation and is shown on maps including the 2008 AAA Clear Lake Communities City Series map and the USGS Lakeport Quadrangle map. Numerous historical references to the Big Valley can be found in the History of Napa and Lake Counties published in 1881 and A Description of Lake County California published in 1888.

The area known as Big Valley was the first settlement in the Lake County region. Captain Salvador Vallejo set up headquarters for his cattle operation there in 1840. Andrew Kelsey, Charles Stone, and E.D. Shirland acquired Vallejo's livestock near Clear Lake, composed of Texas longhorns and horses in 1847. It is unclear if they actually purchased grazing rights in Big Valley. Andrew Kelsey and Charles Stone forced the local Indians to build them a two-room, 15 by 40 feet (5 by 12 m) adobe home with a loft above, about three miles (5 km) from the south shore of the lake, and immediately west of Kelsey Creek, as well as a large cattle corral. The construction took two months and several hundred laborers, who were fed a steer per day. Tensions rose further between the settlers and the Indians over Vallejo's remaining cattle which were allegedly left to the indigenous tribe, as Kelsey and Stone ordered the vaqueros to round them up. The Indians, belonging to different tribes, Lil'eek Wappo and Eastern Pomo, were forced to reside and remain in two enclosed camps on each side of the creek. Historical accounts state that their treatment was harsh causing a great deal of resentment among the laborers. Kelsey and Stone were murdered by the natives in 1848 leading to a decade of unstable relations and no further attempts to settle the area. With the signing of a treaty between the Pomo Indians and the U S Government in 1851, Lake County was again opened for settlement.
Once Lake County was reopened, settlers began arriving and establishing their homes in the Big Valley area. Early references to the Big Valley note that the area was suitable for agriculture with rich soil and excellent climate. A description of the Big Valley was included in the History of Napa and Lake Counties. "Big Valley – This valley lies on the southwestern margin of Clear Lake, and extends from Lakeport, in a south-westerly direction, a distance of nine miles. In width it ranges from one to seven miles. Adobe, Kelsey, and Christie Creeks serve as avenues of escape for the watershed of the valley. The soil is very rich, and well adapted to agricultural purposes." Further in the section on Topography in this same book, the following comment is made, "Big Valley is the garden spot In the of Lake County". discussion of Products of the Big Valley Township, it is noted that "Small fruits and berries thrive here also, as do grapes. The future outlook for the grape-growing interest of this section is encouraging, truly, and the time is not far distant when it will be the chief industry of the whole of Lake County."

Evidence of viticulture is contained in the book A Description of Lake County California published in 1888 in the section on Lakeport and Its Surroundings. In the section on “Big Valley" it was noted that “the orchards and vineyards bear abundantly in season." By 1855, commercial pear orchards were planted in Big Valley. At the turn of the century, the first commercial walnut orchards were planted. Also, vineyards were planted in many areas of the County and in close proximity to Big Valley, including the Staheli vineyard on Kelsey Creek, the vineyards of George A Buckingham in the area currently known as Buckingham Point and the Dorn family on the low slopes of Mount Konocti above Soda Bay. Wine grapes disappeared until growers again started planting grapes in the mid 1960s. Fifth generation pear farmer Myron Holdenried was one of the first to plant grapes in Big Valley in recent times. The following is Myron’s account of the decision to plant grapes: “I had recently finished at UC Davis, and we were raising Angus Cattle and Bartlett pears. The cattle business was very weak at that time and several of us, Walt Lyon, Reid Dorn, Floyd Silva, and I were looking for alternative crops. The Extension Service including Russell Gripp and John Smith, Farm Advisors, were recommending that we look into viticulture. After visiting with John Parducci and others in Mendocino County and with the help of Amand Kasamatis in Davis, we planted vines in 1966." Kendall – Jackson Winery also started in the Big Valley District area. Although the winery operation has moved to Sonoma County, Kendall-Jackson still owns and farms the home ranch located on Matthews Road in the Big Valley District– Lake County area. In an article published on the death of Jess Jackson in the Wine Spectator, the beginnings of Kendall Jackson in Lake County were described. “In 1974, Jackson and his first wife, Jane Kendall Jackson, bought a farm in Lake County, north of Napa Valley, and began converting the pear and walnut orchards into vineyards. But by the early 1980s Jackson was having trouble selling his grapes and began making his own wine.
Jackson combined his name with his wife’s maiden name to create the Kendall-Jackson label. The winery’s initial success was quite by accident. While making the 1982 Chardonnay, the fermentation became stuck, which meant the yeast stopped converting sugar into alcohol, leaving the wine slightly sweet. Jackson brought in various winemakers to resolve the situation but to no avail. Jackson decided to release the wine anyway, labeling it Vintner’s Reserve Chardonnay. It was a hit with consumers."
Today, vineyards in Big Valley District– Lake County are the primary crop in this prime agricultural area. It contains some 43 wine grape growers, 6 wineries, and approximately 1,800 acres (728 ha) of cultivation.

== Terroir ==
=== Topography ===
The Big Valley District-Lake County viticultural area is a bowl-shaped valley with an average elevation of approximately 1,360 feet (415 m). With slopes of less than 2.5%, the terrain is almost completely flat, tilting gently downward to the north towards Clear Lake. Higher, steeper elevations are found to the east and west of the viticultural area, as shown on USGS maps. To the east, Mount Konocti reaches a height of 4,300 feet (1,311 m). To the west, the Mayacmas Mountains rise to 3,320 feet (1,012 m) at Monument Peak. The low, flat topography of the viticultural area allows cold air draining from the higher surrounding elevations to pool in the valley, as previously discussed, and also contributes to lower annual rainfall amounts and lower risk of soil erosion than in the surrounding regions.

=== Climate ===
The petition to establish the Big Valley District–Lake County viticultural area included information on the wind, growing degree days, frost-free days, and precipitation within the viticultural area and the surrounding regions.
The winds within the Big Valley District—Lake County viticultural area are influenced by the region’s proximity to both Clear Lake and the higher elevations of the neighboring Mayacmas Mountains, Red Hills, and Mount Konocti. Water in Clear Lake warms more slowly than the adjacent land during the day and also holds its heat longer at night. At night, the cool air in the mountains becomes heavy and sinks into the lower elevations. As it flows across the lake, the air is warmed by the heat being slowly released from the water. The warmed air becomes less dense and rises, pulling more of the cooler, heavier air from the shore and creating south-north breezes that blow towards the lake. During the day, the land becomes warmer than the lake, reversing the process and causing north-south winds that blow towards the shore. The average wind speeds were gathered from two weather stations, Bell Hill West and Kelseyville, within the Big Valley District—Lake County viticultural area. The data was collected from 2008 through 2010 According to the petition, the winds within the viticultural area are strong enough to reduce heat stress on the vines and to remove excess moisture that promotes mildew. However, they are not strong enough to damage leaves or buds, nor are they strong enough to force the stoma on the leaves to close. When the stoma on the leaves close, the vines do not photosynthesize efficiently and fruit ripens more slowly. To the east and southeast of the Big Valley District—Lake County viticultural area, on Mount Konocti and in the Red Hills, the winds are also influenced by both the lake and the slopes of the mountains. However, a diagram produced by the Lake County Air Pollution Control District included with the petition suggests that the winds in the Red Hills and Mount Konocti blow in a west-east direction, as they are channeled around the ridges and peaks of the rugged terrain. The average wind speeds also suggest the winds to the east and southeast of the viticultural area are stronger, especially in the afternoon, with speeds ranging up to ten miles per hour (16 km/h). Winds of this strength stimulate the stoma of the leaves to close and can damage leaves and buds.
The number of growing degree days (GDDs) 1 from three weather stations within the viticultural area to three stations located in the established Red Hills Lake County viticultural area, to the southeast. According to the petition, weather station data is not available for the region immediately west of the viticultural area, and recent temperature data was also not available from the Lakeport weather station to the northwest of the viticultural area. According to the data, the Big Valley District—Lake County viticultural area has fewer annual GDDs than the Red Hills Lake County viticultural area, indicating cooler temperatures within the viticultural area. The number of GDDs for the viticultural area classifies it as a high Region II or low Region III on the Winkler classification scale. The Red Hills Lake County viticultural area, by contrast, has enough GDDs to classify it as a Region IV area. The GDDs of an area play a role in determining the varieties of grapes that are best suited for planting. The cool climate of the viticultural area is suitable for growing Sauvignon Blanc, which is one of the more cultivated grape varieties within the viticultural area but is not grown as commonly in the surrounding regions. The cooler temperatures also results in fewer frost-free days within the Big Valley District—Lake County viticultural area as compared to the region to the east, within the Red Hills Lake County viticultural area.

=== Geology ===
During the Jurassic period, approximately 135 million years ago, Lake County was covered by water. About 3 million years ago, side-by-side "strike-slip" movement of tectonic plates along the San Andreas Fault warped the layers of rock on the lake bed and began forming structural basins underneath the water, including the structural basin that constitutes the Big Valley District–Lake County viticultural area. The region of the Big Valley District–Lake County viticultural area remained underwater until approximately 460,000 years ago, when Mount Konocti was formed. As the mountain rose, it forced the landmass known today as Big Valley to rise above the surface. When the Big Valley landmass rose, it brought with it the sedimentary lake bed deposits that eventually formed the deep, nutrient-rich soil desired by vineyard owners. The two major geological units of the viticultural area, the Franciscan Complex and Great Valley sequence, formed through subduction, the process of one tectonic plate sliding beneath another. The formations are composed of chert, greywacke, shale, metasedimentary rocks, and metavolcanic rocks thrown together as the two plates collided. The weathering of these rocks contributes to the soil nutrient content and soil pH levels within the viticultural area, which affect vine growth and fruit development.
Three fault lines that are part of the San Andreas Fault system run beneath the Big Valley District–Lake County viticultural area: The Big Valley Fault, the Adobe Creek Fault, and the Wight Way Fault. The "strike-slip" movement of these faults throughout the ages has contributed to the gentle northerly downward slope of the basin. The basin shape of the viticultural area and its gentle slope contribute to airflow patterns which cool and dry the vineyards, reducing stress on the vines. Additionally, the nearly level terrain within the basin reduces the risk of soil erosion within the viticultural area. To the east of the viticultural area, the geology is dominated by Mount Konocti, a dormant volcano. This mountain is part of the Clear Lakes Volcanics formed in the middle Pliocene Epoch. The rocks are composed of basalt, rhyolite, and other volcanic materials. The region to the west of the viticultural area consists of the Mayacmas Mountains and the uplifted hills and terraces that form their foothills. Rocks of the Franciscan Complex are present, as within the viticultural area, but geological forces have lifted this region high above the valley to form steep and rugged mountains.

=== Soils ===
The soils of the Big Valley District–Lake County viticultural area have lacustrine (freshwater lake) and alluvial (eroded and re-deposited by moving water) origins. Soil pH levels range from a slightly acidic 6.0 to a mildly alkaline 7.5 which, according to USGS, is within the optimal range for nutrient uptake by the grapevines. The soil drainage is poor by nature but has been improved through artificial means. There is little risk of soil erosion within the viticultural area due to the nearly level topography of the valley. Major soil series within the Big Valley District–Lake County viticultural area include Cole clay loam, Clear Lake clay, and Still loam, which together make up approximately 75 percent of the soil within the viticultural area. These soils are generally deep, which allows for good rooting. However, in some locations within the viticultural area, these soils also have "limiting factors," such as hardpan, rocks, or clay substrata, which prevent the roots from penetrating further. Additionally, Clear Lake clay is a high "shrink-swell" clay soil that forms deep cracks when it dries during summer months. The shrinking and cracking of the dried soil can sever the roots of the vines and prevent them from reaching deep into the soil. Factors that limit root depth can be beneficial to grape growers, according to the petition, preventing excessive foliage growth and producing small grapes that have a desirable concentration of flavors and colors. East of the Big Valley District–Lake County viticultural area, the soils are primarily of the Konocti-Benridge series. The soils are formed from volcanic materials such as andesite, basalt, dacite, and pyroclastic tuff. To the west of the viticultural area, the soils are of the Wappo series. Wappo soils are less fertile than the soils within the viticultural area, although they are naturally better drained than the clay and loam soils of the viticultural area. The soils to both the east and west of the viticultural area are generally shallower due to the steeper terrain and are at a greater risk of erosion than the soils of the valley.
