= Brassfield Estate Winery =

Vineyard and winery operation in Lake County, California

- Location: Clearlake Oaks, California, US
- Coordinates: 39°02′46″N 122°42′34″W
- Appellation: High Valley AVA
- Founded: 2000; 25 years ago
- Key people: Jerry Brassfield (Proprietor)

Brassfield Estate Winery is a Certified California Sustainable vineyard and winery operation in the High Valley American Viticultural Area in Lake County, California. The 100% estate-grown, produced, and bottled winery was established by Jerry Brassfield in 2000. Brassfield, who grew up in Porterville, California on an alfalfa farm, founded GNLD, a vitamin and nutrition supplement company. In 1973, he acquired 1,600 acres (650 ha) in the High Valley region of Lake County, California, which he expanded through successive acquisitions, totaling almost 5,000 acres (2,000 ha) which include the dormant Round Mountain volcano which created High Valley.

An estate in a neo-Tuscan style was built on the Serenity Ranch on the floor of High Valley. As of 2025, the winery had approximately 500 acres (200 ha) under vines (with just 220 acres in valley floor, the rest being cultivated on slopes), a 1,000-acre nature preserve, and a mile-long network of caves. Starting in 2022, the winery increased its annual production to position itself as a national and global brand.

Brassfield manages several estate vineyards which range in elevation from 1,800 to almost 3,000 feet in elevation and varied volcanic soil composition: their Monte Sereno vineyard is planted in Franciscan shale at 2,100 feet, the Volcano Ridge vineyard lies at similar elevations in volcanic sands and tephra soils, their Perspective vineyard is on Franciscan shale at 2,900 feet and planted with Syrah and Viognier, and the High Serenity vineyard at 1,800 feet (550 m) on valley soils allows for growing cooler climate varieties like Pinot noir.

In addition to single varietal wines from Cabernet Sauvignon, Grenache, Malbec, Merlot, Petite Sirah, Pinot gris, Sauvignon blanc, Petit Verdot, Viognier or Zinfandel, Brassfield produces two signature blends: their red Eruption, a mix of Cabernet Sauvignon, Syrah, Malbec, Petite Sirah, Mourvèdre, Grenache and Zinfandel from their Volcano Ridge vineyard; and Serenity, a white blend of Pinot gris, Sauvignon blanc, Viognier and Gewürztraminer grown in gravelly valley soils.

The company was a key petitioner in obtaining recognition for High Valley as an American Viticultural Area in eastern Lake County in 2005.
