= Best (surname) =

Best is a surname. Notable people with the surname include:

- Adam Best (actor) (born 1983), British actor
- Ahmed Best (born 1973), American voice actor
- Alan Best (filmmaker) (born 1959), Canadian animator
- Alan Best (sculptor) (1910–2001), Canadian sculptor
- Alfred M. Best (1876–1958), American insurance executive
- Alonzo L. Best (1854–1923), American politician
- Andy Best (born 1959), British footballer
- Art Best (1953–2014), American football player
- C. L. Best (1878–1951), American entrepreneur, founder and chairman of Caterpillar Tractor Company
- Calum Best (born 1981), American TV personality, son of George Best
- Carlisle Best (born 1959), West Indian cricketer
- Charles Best (medical scientist) (1899–1978), American/Canadian physiologist
- Charles Alexander Best (1931–1978), Canadian politician
- Carrie Best (1903–2001), the first black owner and publisher of a Nova Scotia newspaper
- Clyde Best (born 1951), Bermudan footballer
- Daniel Best (1838–1923), American businessman, founder of Best Manufacturing Company which made tractors and combine harvesting machines
- David Best (footballer) (1943–2025), English footballer
- David Best (politician) (1880–1949), Manitoba politician
- David Best (sculptor) (born 1945), American sculptor
- Denzil Best (1917–1965), American jazz percussionist
- Earl Best (1947–2021), American community organizer known as the "Street Doctor"
- Edna Best (1900–1974), British actress
- Eike Best (born 1951), German computer scientist
- Eleanor Best (1875–1958), British artist
- Elsdon Best (1856–1931), New Zealand ethnographer
- Eva Best (1851–1925), American story writer, poet, music composer, dramatist
- Eve Best (born 1971), British stage actress
- George Best (1946–2005), Northern Irish football player
- George Newton Best (1846–1926), American botanist
- Greg Best (born 1964), American equestrian competitor and coach
- Greg Best (American football) (born 1960), American football defensive back
- Harold Best (1937–2020), British Labour Party politician
- James Best (1926–2015), American actor
- Jacob Best (1786–1861), German-American brewer, founder of the Pabst Brewing Company
- Jahvid Best (born 1989), American football running back
- Jerry Best (footballer, born 1901) (1901–1975), English footballer
- Jerry Best (bassist) (born 1963), American musician
- Jerry Best (footballer, born 1897) (1897–1955), English footballer
- John Best (bishop) (died 1570), Bishop of Carlisle from 1560 to 1570
- John Best (Canadian politician) (1861–1923), Canadian politician
- John Best (guard captain) (16th century), English Captain of the Yeomen of the Guard
- John Best (soccer) (1940–2014), US/English soccer player
- John William Best (1912–2000), Royal Air Force pilot who was a POW in Colditz Castle during World War II
- Keith Best (born 1949), British Conservative Party politician
- Korban Best (born 2003), American Paralympic sprinter
- Leon Best (born 1986), Irish international footballer
- Margarett Best (born 1958), Canadian politician
- Marion Best, Canadian church leader
- Marion Hall Best (1905–1988), Australian interior designer
- Marjorie Best (1903–1997), American Hollywood costume designer
- Martin Best (born 1942), British musician in ballads and early music
- Mary Ellen Best (1809–1891), English artist
- Matthew Best (Royal Navy officer) (1878–1940), Royal Navy officer
- Matthew Best (conductor) (1957–2025), English bass singer and conductor
- Meagan Best (born 2002), Barbadian squash player
- Nellie Geraldine Best (1905–1990), American artist, muralist, and sculptor
- Nicky Best, British statistician
- Neil Best (born 1979), Irish rugby union international
- Paul Best (cricketer) (born 1991), English cricketer
- Pete Best (born 1941), British musician, original drummer for The Beatles
- Peter Best (composer) (born 1943), Australian film composer
- Richard Irvine Best (1872–1959), Irish scholar
- Richard Stuart Best (born 1945), British charity director and life peer
- Richard Halsey Best (1910–2001), US Navy pilot
- Robert Henry Best (1896–1952), American journalist convicted of treason in 1948
- Rory Best (born 1982), Irish rugby union international
- S. T. C. Best "Canon Best" (1864–1949), Anglican priest in South Australia
- Sigismund Payne Best (1885–1978), British Secret Intelligence Service agent
- Simon Best (born 1978), Irish rugby union international
- Skeeter Best (1914–1985), American jazz guitarist
- Sonja M. Best, Australian-American virologist
- Stephanie Best (born 1969), American track and field athlete
- Steven Best (born 1955), American animal rights activist
- Tino Best (born 1981), West Indian cricketer
- Tommy Best (1920–2018), Welsh footballer
- Travis Best (born 1972), American professional basketball player
- Werner Best (1903–1989), German jurist, police chief and SS–Obergruppenführer
- William Best, 1st Baron Wynford (1767–1845), British politician and judge
- William Thomas Best (1826–1897), English organist and composer
- Adolfo Best Maugard (1891–1964), Mexican painter, film director, and screenwriter

== See also ==
- Beste (disambiguation)
- Bester (disambiguation)
- Bestor
