= Beste =

Beste may refer to:

== Given name ==
- Beste Bereket (born 1982), Turkish actress
- Beste Kaynakçı (born 1994), Turkish female yacht racer
- Beste Kökdemir (born 1993), Turkish actress
- Beste Toparlak (born 1993), Turkish harpist

== Surname ==
- Henry Digby Beste (1768–1836), English writer and aristocrat
- Jan-Niklas Beste (born 1999), German footballer

== Other uses ==
- Beste (Turkish music), a vocal genre in Ottoman classical music
- Beste (river), a river in Schleswig-Holstein, northern Germany
- Knutsen & Ludvigsens Beste, a hits album

== See also ==
- Bester (disambiguation)
- Bestor
- Best (surname)
