= Alan Best =

Alan Best may refer to:

- Alan Best (filmmaker) (born 1959), Canadian animation director and producer
- Alan Best (sculptor) (1910–2001), Canadian sculptor and natural historian
- Alan Best (politician) (1906–1953), American businessman and politician
