= Rene di Rosa =

American winemaker

Rene di Rosa (May 14, 1919 – October 3, 2010) was an American vintner and art collector.

== Personal life ==
Rene di Rosa was born in Boston and graduated from Yale University where he was editor of the Yale Daily News. He took a job in 1950 as a reporter for the San Francisco Chronicle after serving in World War II and then spending some time in Paris. Di Rosa married artist Veronica McDonald (1934–1991) in 1974.

== Winery Lake Vineyard ==
In 1960, di Rosa purchased 460 acres of land in Carneros region in the Napa Valley. On a 250-acre portion of that land, in an area once known as Talcoa Vineyard, di Rosa planted grapes and called his new fields the Winery Lake Vineyard. Di Rosa produced Chardonnay and Pinot noir on site, but he received the most accolades for the grapes he sold to other vineyards in the region, including Belvedere and Acacia. In 1979, di Rosa was a founding partner of Hagafen Cellars, along with Ernie Weir, Zach Berkowitz, and Norm Miller. In 1986, di Rosa sold the Winery Lake Vineyard to Joseph E. Seagram & Sons and used the money to invest in his art collection.

== Art collection ==
Di Rosa became acquainted with the Northern California counterculture artists in San Francisco's North Beach when he first arrived in the 1950s. He became very involved in collecting Northern California art in the 1960s while taking viticulture classes at UC Davis, whose art department included Robert Arneson, Roy De Forest, and William T. Wiley, among others.

Di Rosa's collection consists of works of art spanning Bay Area movements such as assemblage, the Bay Area Figurative Movement, Funk Art, and Conceptual Art. Key artists include Joan Brown, Jay DeFeo, Viola Frey, Robert Arneson, William T. Wiley, Peter Voulkos, Robert H. Hudson, Bruce Conner, Manuel Neri, Carlos Villa, Nathan Oliveira, Richard Shaw, David Best, and more.

Di Rosa housed his collection in a historic home (formally of Talcoa Vineyard) and additional buildings he constructed on his property, most of which is classified as a nature preserve under the Land Trust of Napa County. In 1997, he opened the property, dubbed the di Rosa Preserve, to visitors. In 2000, the collection and property was incorporated as a public trust. In 2002, di Rosa stepped down and the institution's first executive director, Jack Rasmussen, was hired. Now referred to simply as di Rosa, the organization maintains the collection, organizes rotating contemporary art exhibitions, and presents educational and public programs.
