= Henrik Takkenberg =

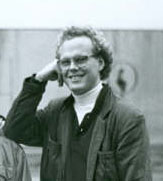
- Henrik Takkenberg, circa 1990

Background information
- Also known as: Henrik T
- Born: Henrik Pieter Takkenberg; August 23, 1967; Bogotá, Colombia
- Died: November 25, 2006 (aged 39) Madrid, Spain
- Genres: Ambient; Advertising; Electronic; Alternative rock Soundtrack
- Occupations: musician, songwriter, producer
- Instruments: Vocals, shakuhachi, flute, saxophone, guitar
- Years active: 1986–2006
- Labels: Sony BMG; Subterfuge; Café del Mar

Henrik Takkenberg (August 23, 1967 – November 25, 2006) was a lead singer, songwriter, composer and producer who developed a new musical style he named Flamenco Chill.

== Biography ==
He was the producer and a member of the Spanish group Chambao (Sony BMG) and produced Cathy Claret on the album Sambisarane (Subterfuge Records). The fusion of electronic ambient sounds with Flamenco, transformed the interpretation of this traditional Spanish music and met with popular success.

His profound knowledge of ethnic, classical and electronic music were influenced by his Asian and Japanese Language and Literature Degree studies at Doshisha University in Kyoto, Japan in the Associated Kyoto Program exchange with Connecticut College. There, he studied the Shakuhachi and medieval Japanese notation from 1988 to 1989 with Nakao Tozan, director of the Shin-Tozan-Ryu School of Shakuhachi, daughter of the founder.

He worked at the National Sound Archive in London as assistant to Dr. Janet Topp Fargion and updated the archive records on Japanese music and also documented the Lesotho music collection at the International Music Collection Department. This allowed him to further his research into Native American, African and Japanese traditional music.

He worked at the Japan Society in New York City in the Film, Theatre and Music Department, and was Assistant Stage Manager to Toru Takemitsu at the New York International Festival of the Arts in 1990. Back in London at the Beat Factory studio he managed Fruithouse Records with Sonia Cristina from Curved Air, and assisted producer Graeme Holdaway on projects such as Salad and Transglobal Underground.

With the support of Thomas Brooman and Peter Gabriel, Takkenberg and the members of his band "Bass Camp", performed at the WOMAD World Music and Dance Festival in 1995 where he recorded with Vernon Reid of Living Colour, Joe Strummer of The Clash, Mark Rutherford, and Ayub Ogada. He also worked with Kevin Locke and Pow Wow of the Lakota-Sioux Nation, Sôzan Chiaki Kariya from Japan, and Purna and Paba Das Baul from West Bengal, composing a Real World compilation release featuring them, and Ali Farka Toure from Mali.

He received a diploma from Trinity College, London in Music Composition for Film before joining M62. His Work for Orange, "Future Thoughts" together with Max Richter, directed by Ridley Scott, and recorded with the London Symphony Orchestra conducted by David Snell, was finalist at the British Television Advertising Awards in 1998. He made tracks for the United Nations High Commissioner for Refugees (Young & Rubicam), Drug Free America (RSA), Nintendo (Leagas Delaney), Nike (RSA), Shell Ferrari, Marlboro, BMW, Het Parool in the Netherlands (Kesselkramer), (Saatchi & Saatchi) and others.

The desire to be with his family pulled him to Spain, where on the beaches of Málaga, he struggled to get Chambao off the ground. He introduced them to Sony BMG, and got them a five-record deal. Irreconcilable differences forced him to leave the band, while still maintaining a close relationship with Daniel Casan, the band's songwriter.

He then settled in Madrid, where he set up Magik Sound Productions, producing the critically acclaimed record for Cathy Claret, "Sambisarane" with Subterfuge Records and various pieces for Café del Mar, including "Espiral" in the 25th anniversary edition. His studio shared with Hugo Westerdahl in Madrid allowed him to work with Eduardo Paniagua and Paco de Lucía.

== Early life ==
Takkenberg was born to Frits Takkenberg and Renate Takkenberg-Krohn on August 23, 1967 in Bogotá, Colombia. His mother is a photographer and his father was on the board of directors of Holland Chemical International (HCI Chemicals B.V.). In Bogotá he learned to play the Tiple (18 string small guitar) and the piano at the age of nine. The family moved to Spain in 1977 where his interests in music were encouraged further at Runnymede College in Madrid. After the divorce of his parents, he leaves for boarding school in England in 1982.

At Stowe School in Buckinghamshire, he fell on fertile ground for rock bands and met kindred minds with a taste for life. Rugby union and the bands Early Birds, Flat Hat, Crosstalk, Red Shift, Dirty Boots and Earth Hum, from 1985 to 1995, formed his ideas on friendship and loyalty. His school trip to Nepal became an experience that would transform his view on the world and fire his interest in eastern philosophy, culture and music. He attached great importance to the conciliatory and spiritually enriching value of music and its ability to make us forget frontiers and "dance together as equals".

Below is a current list of works by Henrik Takkenberg with dates of publication in parentheses:

== Henrik Takkenberg works, by genre ==
=== Recordings ===
- Chambao, Flamenco Chill, Sony BMG Music (Spain) Premio Ondas for best song, "Instinto Humano" (Artist/Producer credit) (2003)
- Chambao, Endorfinas en la Mente, Sony BMG Music (Spain) Best new album of the year 2003 (Artist/Producer credit)
- Cafe del Mar 25 anniversary edition, "Espiral" with Carmen Estevez. As Henrik T. (2004)
- Cafe del Mar Vol. 11, "Sueño de la Montaña" (2005)
- La Tana, "Tú Ven a Mi" (remix), with Paco de Lucía. V2 Records (Spain) (2005)
- Cathy Claret, "Sambisarane", Subterfuge Records (Spain) (2005)
- Chill Out Room 2, "Shaken, with Peter Challis, Sony BMG Music (2005)
- Flamenco Chill In, Le, le, le, Remix, Cathy Claret, Sony BMG Music (2005)

=== Advertising ===
- Orange, "Future Thoughts" with Max Richter. Performed by the London Symphony Orchestra. Conducted by David Snell and Directed by Ridley Scott. Best original music finalist at the British Television Advertising Awards (1998). WCRS (UK)
- Carling Premier, directed by Wim Wenders (1998) WCRS (UK)
- Camelot, WCRS (UK) (1998)
- BMW, AP Lintas (UK) (1998)
- Siemens
- Shell Shell Ferrari (UK) (1998)
- Johnnie Walker, BBH/M62 (UK) (1997)
- Nintendo (1997)
- U.N.H.C.R. Young & Rubicam (1997)
- Ford Fiesta, Young & Rubicam (1996)
- Ford, Young & Rubicam (1996)
- Benson & Hedges, Worldwide advertising campaign. Bates Dorland UK(1997)
- Martini, Directed by Mario Cavalli, HHCL James Bond Martini, (UK) (1998)
- Martini, M62 (UK) (1998)
- Kodak, M62 (UK) (1998)
- Guinness, M62 (UK) (1998)
- Happy Dent, M62 (UK) (1998)
- VH1, M62 (UK) (1998)
- BBC World Service, Science in Action, program titles (Radio) (1995)
- Marlboro, "Tequila" directed by Luke Scott (U.S.A.) (1998)
- Drug Free America, directed by Luke Scott (U.S.A.), RSA, (1998)
- Nike, directed by Luke Scott, RSA (U.S.A.) (1998)
- Walls Ice Cream, directed by Luke Scott, RSA (U.S.A.) (1997)
- Lipton Ice, directed by Luke Scott, RSA (U.S.A.) (1997)
- Sprandy, directed by Luke Scott, RSA (U.S.A.) (1996)
- Campbell's, M&C Saatchi (UK) (1997)
- Boots Chemist, M&C Saatchi (UK) (1997)
- Sunday Business, Saatchi & Saatchi (UK) (1997)
- Comet, Saatchi & Saatchi (UK) (1996)
- Actimel, Saatchi & Saatchi (UK) (1996)
- Healthcare UK. Saatchi & Saatchi (UK) (1997)
- D2, (Germany) (1997)
- Het Parool News, Kesselkramer (Netherlands) (1996)
- Winston Hotel, London, (UK) (1997)
- Coca-Cola, (Spain) (2006)

=== Music for film ===
- Luton Hostel, Documentary, Keil Wright Productions (1996)
- Practical Magic, Film Trailer, Warner Bros. (1996)
- Diggers, Film Trailer, Carter White Productions, directed by David White (1996)
- Azumi, Design Award Film (Japan) (1997)
- Still Life, BFCS Directed by Tracey Rowe (1996)
- To All My Relations, Short film Directed by Luke Scott, RSA (1996)
- Cafe del Mar – The Legend , Henrik T – Sueño de la montaña (2006)

=== Music for dance ===
- Andanzas, Madrid, Spain. "La Miel y la Hiel" production for the Cervantes Institute (Instituto Cervantes) in Moscow, Russia (2006)
- Jerwood Foundation, "Diceman", London England (1994)
