= Bestor =

Bestor is an Anglo-American surname, and may refer to:

- Arthur E. Bestor (1879–1944), American educator and civic leader
- Arthur Bestor (1908–1994), American historian and educational critic
- Barbara Bestor, American architect from Los Angeles, California
- Charles L. Bestor (1924–2016), American composer of electronic and orchestral music
- Don Bestor (1889–1970), American bandleader
- Kurt Bestor, American composer, arranger, and entertainer
- Theodore C. Bestor (1951–2021), American professor of anthropology and Japanese Studies at Harvard University

== See also ==
- Bester (disambiguation)
