= List of Old Runnymedians =

The following is a list of some notable Old Runnymedians, i.e. former pupils of Runnymede College in Spain.

== Royalty ==
- Grand Duke George Mikhailovich of Russia, heir apparent of the Russian imperial family
- Grand Duchess Maria Vladimirovna of Russia, Head of the Russian imperial family

== Academia ==
- Elizabeth Pisani, academic researcher
- Elif Shafak, essayist and women's rights activist

== Arts ==
- David Broza, singer-songwriter
- Gabino Diego, actor
- Vicky Larraz, singer and tv presenter
- Henrik Takkenberg, singer and composer

== Media ==
- Rebecca Loos, former model

== Sport ==
- Brooklyn Beckham, model and son of David Beckham
- Romeo Beckham, son of David Beckham
- Felicity Galvez, Olympic gold-medalist swimmer
- Simon Shaw, rugby union player

== Other ==
- Rafael Lozano-Hemmer, electronic artist
