= Biester =

Biester is a surname. Notable people with the surname include:

- Edward G. Biester Jr. (born 1931), American politician and judge
- Johann Erich Biester (1749–1816), German philosopher

== See also ==
- Biester Palace, a home in Sintra, Portugal named after Frederico Biester
- Bester
- Riester
