= Theodore Bestor =

American anthropologist (1951–2021)

Theodore C. Bestor
- Born: August 7, 1951; Urbana, Illinois, US
- Died: July 1, 2021 (aged 69); Cambridge, Massachusetts, U.S.
- Education: Western Washington University; Stanford University
- Occupations: Anthropologist, professor
- Spouse: Victoria Lyon Bestor
- Parents: Arthur Bestor; Dorothy Alden Koch Bestor

Theodore C. Bestor (August 7, 1951 – July 1, 2021) was a professor of anthropology and Japanese studies at Harvard University. He was the president of the Association for Asian Studies in 2012. In 2018, he resigned as director from the Reischauer Institute following an investigation by Harvard officials that found he committed two counts of sexual misconduct.

== Biography ==
=== Early life ===
Bestor was born on August 7, 1951, in Urbana, Illinois. His father, Arthur Bestor, was a historian of American 19th-century communitarian settlements and of the origins and development of the American constitution. His mother, Dorothy Alden Koch Bestor, was a professor of English literature. Bestor lived in Champaign-Urbana until he was eleven, when his parents moved to Seattle. He first visited Japan in 1967, when his father received a Fulbright Fellowship to teach at the University of Tokyo, Rikkyo University, and Doshisha University.

He attended secondary school in Seattle and graduated from Fairhaven College of Western Washington University in 1973. His graduate education was at Stanford University, where he received master's degrees in East Asian studies (1976) and anthropology (1977), and a PhD in anthropology in 1983. During his graduate studies, he spent two years at the Inter-University Center for Japanese Language Studies in Tokyo.

=== Career ===
He started his career as program director for Japanese and Korean studies at the Social Science Research Council. He then taught at Columbia University and Cornell University, and was a visiting professor at the Kyoto Consortium for Japanese Studies. He became a professor of anthropology at Harvard University in 2001. He served as the chair of the department of anthropology from 2007 to 2012.

During 2012–2013, he was president of the Association for Asian Studies. He was also president of the American Anthropological Association's Society for Urban Anthropology and the Society for East Asian Anthropology (of which he was the founding president). During 2012–2018 he was the director of Harvard's Reischauer Institute of Japanese Studies.

He has written widely on the culture and society of Japan. Much of his research has focused on contemporary Tokyo, including an ethnography of daily life in an ordinary neighborhood, Miyamoto-cho. Since the early 1990s, his primary research has concerned Tokyo's Tsukiji fish market where he has studied the economic anthropology of institutions, and has focused also on food culture, globalization, and Japan's fishing industry.

In 2013, he received an award from Japan's Agency for Cultural Affairs for his contributions to international understanding of Japan. In 2017, he was awarded the Order of the Rising Sun by the Government of Japan.

In 2018, a Harvard investigation found Bestor committed two counts of sexual misconduct during an interaction with a female professor at a 2017 conference at UCLA. Harvard's Faculty of Arts and Sciences disciplined Bestor for the incident, but allowed him to return to work before completing the required sanctions. The controversy continued as of 2020.

== Personal life ==
His wife, with whom he co-edited and co-authored many publications, was Victoria Lyon Bestor. She is the executive director of the North America Coordinating Council on Japanese Library Resources. They have a child, Nickey. (born 1986).

Theodore C. Bestor died in Cambridge, Massachusetts on July 1, 2021, at the age of 69, from cancer.

== Publications ==
- Doing Fieldwork in Japan, Theodore C. Bestor, Patricia G. Steinhoff, and Victoria Lyon Bestor (co-editors), University of Hawai'i Press, 2003 (ISBN 978-0-8248-2734-2)
- Neighborhood Tokyo, Theodore C. Bestor, Stanford University Press 1989 and Kodansha International 1990 (ISBN 978-0-8047-1797-7)
- Tsukiji: The Fish Market at the Center of the World, Theodore C. Bestor, University of California Press, Berkeley, 2004 (ISBN 978-0-520-22024-9)
- Routledge Handbook of Japanese Culture and Society, Victoria Lyon Bestor and Theodore C. Bestor, with Akiko Yamagata (co-editors), Routledge, 2011 (ISBN 978-0-415-86334-6)

== Awards ==
- 1990 Choice Outstanding Academic Book Award.
- 1990 Hiromi Arisawa Memorial Award, given by the American Association of University Presses.
- 1990 Robert Park Award, given by the American Sociological Association.
- 1993 Abe Fellowship, given by the Social Science Research Council.
