= Clear Lake AVA =

American Viticultural Area in Lake County, California

Coordinates: 38°59′03″N 122°36′57″W

Clear Lake
- Wine region
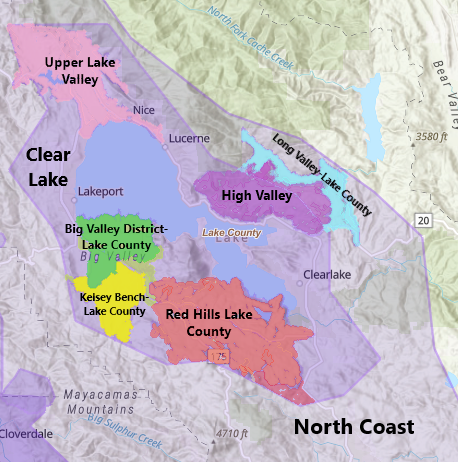
- Type: American Viticultural Area
- Year established: 1984; 2022 Amend
- Years of wine industry: 156
- Country: United States
- Part of: California, North Coast AVA, Lake County
- Other regions in California, North Coast AVA, Lake County: Benmore Valley AVA, Guenoc Valley AVA, Long Valley-Lake County AVA
- Sub-regions: Big Valley District-Lake County AVA, High Valley AVA, Kelsey Bench-Lake County AVA, Red Hills Lake County AVA, Upper Lake Valley AVA
- Growing season: 223 days
- Climate region: Region II-III
- Heat units: 2,930–3,260 GDD
- Precipitation (annual average): 37 inches (940 mm)
- Soil conditions: Bright-red, iron-rich volcanic, cinder ash and silt blends, uniform sandy and clay loam and alluvial
- Total area: 168,980 acres (264 sq mi)
- Size of planted vineyards: 9,000+ acres (3,600+ ha)
- No. of vineyards: 16
- Grapes produced: Cabernet Franc, Cabernet Sauvignon, Chardonnay, Grenache, Malbec, Merlot, Muscat Canelli, Petite Sirah, Pinot gris, Riesling, Sangiovese, Sauvignon blanc, Semillon, Syrah/Shiraz, Tempranillo/Valdepenas, Viognier
- No. of wineries: 13

Clear Lake is an American Viticultural Area (AVA) located entirely within Lake County centered around the largest natural fresh water lake within the boundaries of California and identifies the principal inhabited region of Lake County. The area was established as the nation's 64^{th}, the state's 39^{th} and the county's third appellation on June 7, 1984 by the Bureau of Alcohol, Tobacco and Firearms (ATF), Treasury after reviewing the petition submitted by three of the grape-growers and winery owners located in an area surrounding the watershed of Clear Lake in southwestern Lake County proposing the viticultural area named "Clear Lake."
The viticultural area lies between the Mayacamas Mountains to the southwest and the Mendocino National Forest to the northeast. It extends to the southeast just north of the Guenoc Valley viticultural area also in Lake County. Clear Lake viticultural area was later placed entirely within the boundaries of the multi-county North Coast viticultural area. Half of viticultural area contains Clear Lake, the largest body of freshwater, 70.5 square miles (183 km^{2}), in the state and the namesake for the county and town. Localities also use the name "Clear Lake" in their heritage as Clearlake Oaks, Clearlake Park, Clearlake Highlands and Clear Lake State Park. United States Geographical Survey maps document this information. For over a century the Clear Lake region has been a popular resort and agricultural center.
The moderating influence of the lake on the surrounding area results in a climate with less diurnal variation in temperature than surrounding areas where elevations range from 1,300 feet (400 m) to well over 3,000 feet (910 m). Clear Lake AVA has one of the coolest climates in California, which has led to success with grape varietals like Sauvignon Blanc. The plant hardiness zone ranges from 8b to 9b.

== History ==
Although the local Pomo tribes were familiar with Vitis californica vines, the first winegrape vineyards in the area were planted by European American settlers in the 1870s (although it is claimed the first vines were planted in 1854 at Lillie Langtry's Guenoc estate), and in 1884 totaled about 600 acres (243 ha). One of the county's earliest viticulturists was a Frenchman, "Professor" William Claudius Mottier, who near Harbin Springs experimented in the early 1870s with grafting European varieties on californica rootstocks, notably "Carbonet Malbec" (probably Carménère) and Mourvèdre. Mottier's wine is said to have earned Arpad Haraszthy's praise. Another early viticulturist was Serranus Clinton Hastings, who reportedly farmed 125 acres (51 ha) of vineyards (including 60 acres (24 ha) of Zinfandel) in the Upper Lake area and had a 150,000 U.S. gallons (570,000 L) capacity winery and distillery in 1886. He and his brothers eventually acquired more acreage in the region, but the winery ceased operation in 1900.

Reported varieties planted in the 1880s feature Zinfandel, Charbono, Riesling, Golden Chasselas, and Burger, grown notably in a 300-acre vineyard planted by the California Agricultural and Improvement Association in the Lower Lake area. In 1907, Lake County reported 7 wineries and a production of 34,500 US gal (130,597 L).

There were over thirty wineries when Prohibition was enacted dealing a serious blow to Lake County's viticulture industry. Wineries were closed and most vineyards were uprooted and replaced with walnut and pear orchards which have remained significant although secondary crops in the region. Some vineyards were replanted after the 1933 Repeal. A 1953 county agricultural report lists 150 acres (61 ha) of grapes (yielding 175 tons), while walnuts accounted for 4,788 acres (1,938 ha) and pears for 3,792 acres (1,535 ha). Lake County grapes would be sent to neighboring counties for vinification and bottling, to operations such as Fetzer Vineyards or Parducci Winery in Mendocino County. In 1972, a phylloxera control ordinance was passed to address the ongoing pest problem affecting many North Coast vineyards. The decade saw a rapid uptick in vineyard plantings, with 532 acres of bearing grapevines in 1974, 1,237 acres the following year, and 2,680 by 1979.

In 1977, the Lower Lake Winery, the first to open in the county since Prohibition, inaugurated its first crush. In 1979, Albert Moorhead built Konocti Winery in Lakeport. By 1980, 2,990 acres of vineyards had been planted in the county and Lake Wine Producers had been formed to promote the use of local grapes. Lake County Vintners was spun off that group, a co-op of 34 wine growers which took an interest in Konocti Winery.

Guenoc Valley, the county's initial appellation in 1981 followed by Clear Lake AVA. In the early 1980s, Jess Jackson founded Chateau Du Lac in Lakeport, which would become the foundation for the Kendall-Jackson brand. In 1987, the county counted five winery tasting rooms: Stuermer Winery (formerly Lower Lake Winery), Konocti Cellars and Kendall-Jackson in Lakeport, and Guenoc and Channing Rudd Cellars in Middletown. By 1989, Shed Horn Cellars, located south of Middletown, had joined the list.

Having outgrown its Lakeport location, in 1993 Kendall-Jackson moved most of its operations to Windsor, in Sonoma County. In 1996, Jed Steele, who had worked for Kendall-Jackson in Lakeport until 1990 and had since already started his own label as well as consulted for Wildhurst Vineyards in Kelseyville, purchased Konocti Winery.

A slow resurgence of the Lake County wine industry in the late 1990s and 2000s saw the establishments of new wineries, notably Wildhurst Winery, Brassfield Estate Winery, Shannon Ridge, Céago, Gregory Graham Wines, Chacewater Winery, and Six Sigma Ranch and Winery. New AVAs were recognized by the TTB: Napa Valley-based Andy Beckstoffer was instrumental in the creation of the Red Hills AVA in 2004, when he acquired over 1,000 acres (400 ha), and High Valley AVA, where Brassfield Estate and Shannon Ridge already owned acreage, was established the following year.

Wildfires, in particular the 2015 Valley Fire and the 2018 Mendocino Complex Fire, have impacted Lake County's wine industry over the years. While the physical damage to vines has been minimal (some were actually credited as helpful firebreaks, smoke taint affected several vintages.) The Mendocino Complex Fire is estimated to have cost the county's growers over $37 million. The Lake County Winegrape Commission has been collaborating with UC Davis, public agencies, laboratories and other wine groups to investigate the effects of wildfire smoke on crops.

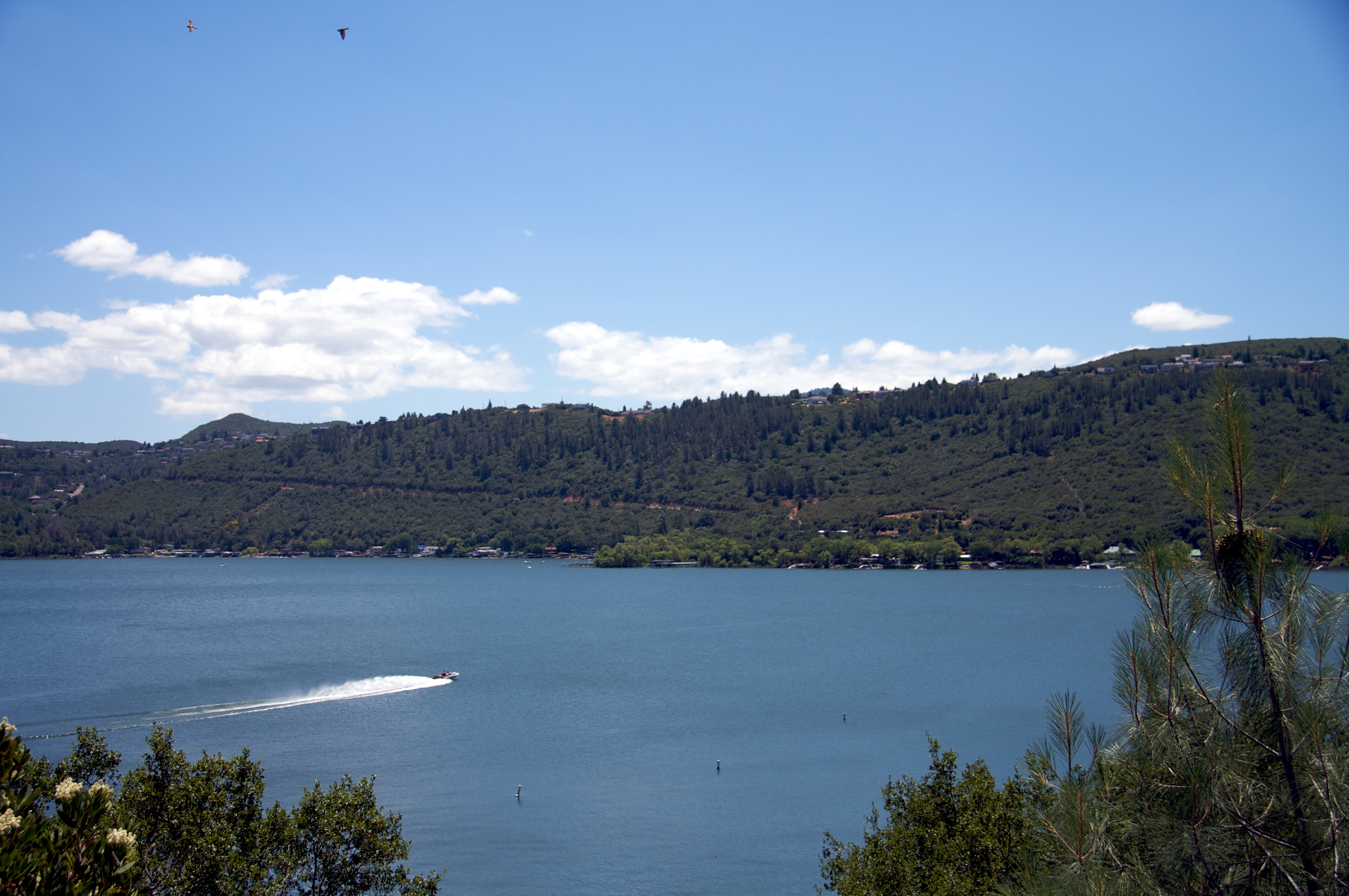
Clear Lake with surrounding terrain

== Terroir ==
=== Topography ===
Clear Lake viticultural area is distinguished from the surrounding areas on the basis of elevation, watershed and climate. The Mendocino National Forest on the northeastern boundary and the Mayacamas Mountain Range on the southwestern boundary geographically isolates Clear Lake from surrounding areas. Both of these mountain areas have heavily forested rugged terrains. In addition, because it is Federally controlled land, the Mendocino National Forest is unavailable for cultivation. The viticultural area is rimmed by steep surrounding mountains ranging in heights to over 4,000 feet (1,200 m). The prominent inactive volcanic mountain, Mt. Konocti at 4,300 feet (1,300 m), rises from the western edge of Clear Lake and dominates the countryside. The soil around the vicinity of Mt. Konocti consists of hillsides composed of rich volcanic alluvial types that are well suited for grape-growing. The lake itself, which is centrally located within the viticultural area is 1,300 feet (400 m) above sea level and the largest natural body of fresh water in California. Because of its size and location, Clear Lake has a demonstrable influence on the grape-growing areas immediately surrounding it. The 9,000+ acres (3,600+ ha) currently cultivated vineyards around the lake are located at elevations of 1,300 to 1,800 feet (400–550 m) on mostly flat or gently rolling benchlands in uniform deep sandy loam and clay loam soils. In comparison, the vineyard areas of Mendocino County located to the west of Clear Lake have average elevations of less than 700 feet (210 m) and the vineyards of Naps and Sonoma Counties located to the south are less than 100 feet (30 m) above sea level.

=== Climate ===
The Clear Lake viticultural area is close enough to the Pacific Ocean to be influenced by the maritime coastal air that flows through the gaps in the mountains located to the west. The coastal air flows gently across Clear Lake, cooling the area surrounding it in the summer. The air flow does not penetrate the high mountains to the east of Clear Lake. On the east side of that mountain area the climate is much warmer, with little air flow. The Clear Lake viticultural area has a unique climate pattern, different than the other north coastal areas. The feature distinguishing Clear Lake from the surrounding areas is the unique influence of the Clear Lake watershed. Clear Lake serves to moderate the temperatures in the appellation throughout the year by creating both a favorable-warming temperature influence in the winter and a cooling influence in the summer. Clear Lake's cold nights offset the daytime heat which makes the viticultural area uniformly cooler than anywhere else in the surrounding north coastal counties. Also, the absence of wind and fog conditions makes the Clear Lake viticultural area different from the surrounding areas. According to the publication entitled "Climatography of the United States. No. 81-4, Decennial Census of U.S. Climate," the growing season in Clear Lake is 223 days which is shorter than the surrounding areas. The average rainfall per year for the Clear Lake area is about 37 inches (940 mm). The average annual rainfall at the Middletown area of Lake County located to the south of the viticultural area is about 62 inches (1,575 mm). The adjacent counties of Sonoma and Mendocino have rainfalls averaging 32 and 39 inches (813 and 991 mm) per year, respectively.

=== Soils ===
The soils are classified by the National Cooperative Soil Survey as the Clear Lake series consisting of very deep, poorly drained soil that formed in fine textured alluvium derived from mixed rock sources. Clear Lake soils are in flood basins, flood plains and in swales of drainageways. Slopes are 0 to 5 percent. Three major rock types within the area are Franciscan Formation (Late Mesozoic), Cenozoic sedimentary rocks and alluvium Cenozoic volcanic rocks. Franciscan Formation contains altered mafic volcanic rocks, deep-sea cherts, greywacke sandstones, limestones, serpentinites, shales, and high-pressure metamorphic rocks. Three characteristics of valley soils in the Clear Lake area are formed in alluvial sediments loam and clay loam: Manzanita: a dark brown/reddish brown, deep soils. Still: deep soils formed in mixed alluvium clay loam. Talmage: dark brown/black soils of poor fertility found on gently sloping floodplains with gravelly sandy loam.

== Viticulture ==
Since the reemergence Lake County viticulture in the 1960s, most grapes harvested in the area were processed in neighboring counties for vinification. Currently, 80% of the county's fruit is sent to Napa County. TTB rules allow for up to 15% of grapes from another area to be blended into a wine that can be labeled an appellation name, and the much lower prices for Lake County grapes have made them an attractive blending proposition for wineries in more prestigious wine regions. In 2023, Lake County Cabernet Sauvignon brought on average $2,321 per ton (as opposed to $9,235 for Napa Valley and $3,058 in Sonoma County), and Sauvignon Blanc averaged $1,425 per ton (as opposed to $3,160 in Napa Valley and $2,054 in Sonoma County).

Some local grapes are also used in wines labelled North Coast, as Lake County is a sub-appellation within the multi-county AVA, or even simply the state appellation. Napa Valley or Sonoma County-based wineries sourcing from the region include Francis Ford Coppola Winery, Trinchero Family Estates, Hagafen Cellars, Arnot-Roberts, Conn Creek or Kendall-Jackson which also has vineyards in Lake County. As of May 2024, the county is resident to about 20 bonded wineries and a number of operations have vineyards and focusing on labels bearing Lake County appellation, even if their wine is made in neighboring Napa, Mendocino or Sonoma counties, such as, Obsidian Ridge, Fore Family Vineyards, Dancing Crow Vineyards, Wild Diamond Vineyards and Sol Rouge.

Through marketing efforts from the Lake County Winegrape Commission, the Lake County Winery Association and regional vintners like the late Jed Steele and Andy Beckstoffer, who heavily invested in the Red Hills appellation, Lake County appellations are used more often on the local winery labels.
