= Jerry Best =

Jerry Best may refer to:

- Jerry Best (bassist) (born 1963), American hard rock bassist, songwriter and composer
- Jerry Best (footballer, born 1897) (1897–1955), English football goalkeeper
- Jerry Best (footballer, born 1901) (1901–1975), English football forward
