= Riester =

Riester is a surname. Notable people with the surname include:

- Franck Riester (born 1974), French politician
- Walter Riester (born 1943), German politician and former Minister of Labour and Social Affairs

== See also ==
- Biester
