= Tsukiji: The Fish Market at the Center of the World =

Book by Theodore Bestor

Tsukiji: The Fish Market at the Center of the World is a non-fiction book by Theodore C. Bestor, published in 2004 by University of California Press. It discusses the Tsukiji fish market.

The book includes content on the economy aspect, cultural aspects, and folklore.

Stephen Gudeman of Science wrote that the concept that "Tsukiji trade is embedded in the relationships, beliefs, and values of Japanese life" is the primary theme of the work.

== Background ==
Bestor worked at Harvard University, focusing on anthropology and Japanese studies, as a professor.

Beginning in 1989, Bestor did on the ground research; he concluded this in 2003.

== Content ==
The book covers anthropological aspects of Tsukiji.

== Reception ==
Anne Allison of Duke University praised the book for having "clarity" in its writing and for the author's skills telling stories.

Michael Ashkenazi of Bonn International Centre for Conversion praised the book for being "remarkable" and how it focuses on Tsukiji as a "social institution" rather than only food-related aspects.

Ronald Dore, a resident of Castel di Casio, Italy, praised the book for being "rich" with a strong writing style and a "detached non-committal attitude".

Scott Schnell of the University of Iowa gave a positive review, stating that "the reader comes away with a better appreciation for the" various aspects discussed in the book, and arguing that the "scope of its coverage" is "impressive".

Richard Swedberg of Cornell University praised the book, describing it as a "monument" to Tsukiji, and arguing the fifth chapter was his favorite; Swedberg stated that Chapter 5 "deserves to be included in some future anthology on markets as social structures."
