= Di Rosa Center for Contemporary Art =

Coordinates: 38.2580°N 122.3529°W

di Rosa Center for Contemporary Art
- Former name: di Rosa Preserve, di Rosa
- Established: 1997
- Location: 5200 Sonoma Highway, Napa, California, United States
- Type: Art Museum & Nature Center
- Collection size: 1,600
- Visitors: 13,000
- Director: Kate Eilertsen
- Website: www.dirosaart.org

di Rosa Center for Contemporary Art is a non-profit art center in Napa, California. di Rosa maintains a collection of approximately 1,600 works of art by Northern California artists including Robert Arneson, Bruce Conner, Jay DeFeo, Tony Labat, and William T. Wiley. The organization is in its 25th year as a public entity.

== Site history ==
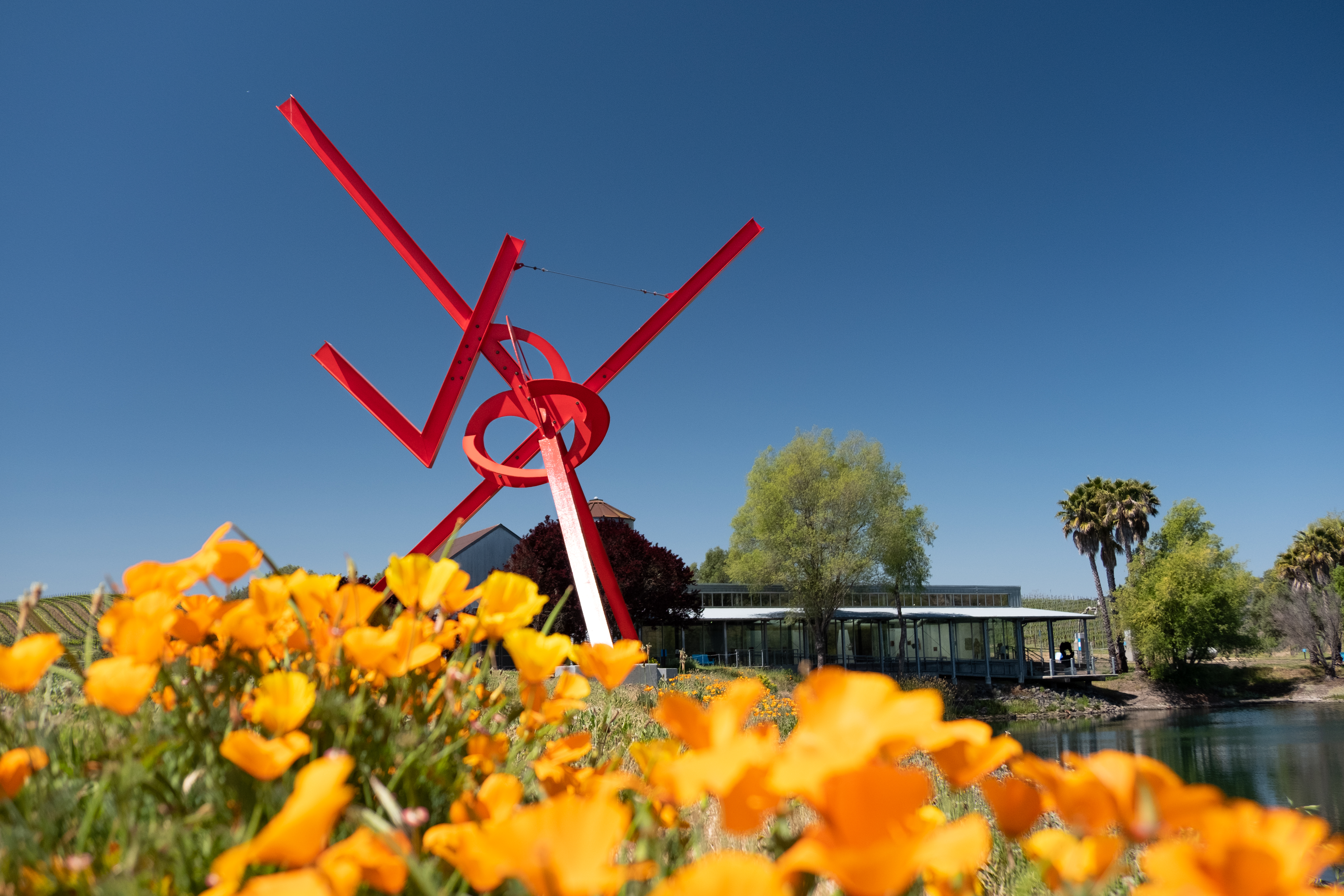
Image of Mark di Suvero's "For Veronica" at the entrance to di Rosa Center for Contemporary Art. Photo: Grace Hendricks

The di Rosa site occupies 217 acres of the original 465 acres of land purchased by Rene di Rosa in 1960. The property was originally part of the Rancho Huichica land grant. The current property, carved out of that grant, was purchased by William Winter in 1855. He planted about 70 acres of grapes and olive trees. In 1884 the property was purchased by two Frenchmen, Michael Debret and Pierre Priet, who named it the Debret Vineyard and built a stone winery in 1886. Phylloxera (root louse) at the end of the 19th century ended those vineyards and the stone winery was eventually used for other things including growing mushrooms, making moonshine, a granary, and ultimately a hay barn. When Rene di Rosa bought the property, the land and stone winery had over the years fallen into disuse and disrepair.

Rene di Rosa's purchase of the acreage turned the land from dairy cattle and reestablished grapes once again. Beginning with the purchase in 1960, he converted the stone winery structure into a house, adding interior rooms, doors, windows, and a bell tower. The property's lake began as a pond dug by WPA workers in the 1930s for irrigation in the surrounding area. Rene built a dam and extended "the pond" into an approximately 35-acre lake, naming it Winery Lake.

In 1963 Winery Lake Vineyards was established. Vines eventually covered some 250 acres. Rene sold the vineyards to Seagram in 1986, using the profits to establish the Rene and Veronica di Rosa Foundation with the vision to build an "art park" for the greater public. As a manifestation of that vision, di Rosa opened to the public in 1997 and became a separate nonprofit 501(c)3 organization in 2000. Originally known as the di Rosa Preserve: Art & Nature, the organization changed its name to the di Rosa Center for Contemporary Art in 2017. The property encompasses multiple galleries and a sculpture meadow and is protected in perpetuity under the Napa County Land Trust.

== Rene and Veronica di Rosa ==
Veronica di Rosa (1934–1991) was born in Canada and trained as an artist at the Emily Carr School of Art. After moving to California she became admired for her work as a watercolorist and sculptor. She married Rene di Rosa in 1976 and continued making art while becoming deeply engaged in philanthropic endeavors in the Napa Valley. Veronica was an active booster of Napa Valley's wines, music, and fine arts, and the author of several illustrated cookbooks.

Rene di Rosa(1919–2010) was born in Boston and graduated from Yale University where he was editor of the Yale Daily News. He served as a Navy lieutenant in World War II and in 1950 took a job as a reporter for the San Francisco Chronicle. While living near the burgeoning North Beach art community, he began to collect the works of emerging Bay Area artists. In 1960 he purchased land in the Carneros region of southern Napa County and planted vineyards. In pursuit of this new endeavor, he enrolled in viticulture classes at the University of California at Davis and developed what would be lifelong friendships with many of the artists who have become the backbone of the di Rosa collection; artists such as Robert Arneson, Roy De Forest, Manuel Neri, and William T. Wiley were all art professors at Davis in the mid-1960s. In the years that followed, Rene became an avid collector and arts activist, serving on the Board of Trustees of the San Francisco Museum of Modern Art, The San Francisco Art Institute and New York's Whitney Museum National Committee.

In 2007, director Nancy Kelly produced Smitten, a documentary about Rene di Rosa and his collection. The film aired on PBS in July 2007.

== di Rosa Collection ==
di Rosa Center for Contemporary Art maintains a permanent collection of works by Northern California artists that was originally collected by Rene di Rosa (1919-2010). The collection contains notable works by artists living or working in the San Francisco Bay Area from mid-twentieth century to the early twenty-first century, highlighting a story of experimentation of the artists of the region. It is displayed in part, on a rotating basis, in the galleries at di Rosa. Work not on view is held in professional offsite storage.

Collection artists include Robert Arneson, David Best, Nayland Blake, Joan Brown, Bruce Conner, Judy Dater, Jay DeFeo, Viola Frey, Robert Hudson, David Ireland, Paul Kos, Jim Melchert, Peter Saul, and William T. Wiley.

The foundation that runs the di Rosa, along with former Executive Director Robert Sain, announced in July 2019 that they would sell most of the current collection of 1,600 works, but keep several hundred. The announcement was met with public outrage and a petition by artists. In 2021, di Rosa changed course under the leadership of Executive Director Kate Eilertsen.

== Exhibitions and programming ==
di Rosa's curatorial staff organizes rotating exhibitions of work from the collection and work by emerging and established Bay Area artists. Notable exhibitions include Oliver Lee Jackson: Any Eyes curated by Diane Roby (November 19, 2021 – February 20, 2022), The Incorrect Museum: Vignettes from the di Rosa Collection curated by Kate Eilertsen (April 2021 – present), Equilibrium: A Paul Kos Survey a solo exhibition of the artist's site-specific conceptual work curated by Amy Owen (April - October 2016)., and The True Artist is an Amazing Luminous Fountain, a traveling exhibition of work from the collection curated by Jack Rasmussen (April 2004 - November 2005).

di Rosa organizes programming and educational programs related to their exhibitions and site. Programs range from artist talks and performances to birdwatching, nature hikes, and summer camps for children.
