= Katrina Best =

British-born short story writer

- Born: Katrina Barton
- Citizenship: British and Canadian
- Occupation: Short story writer
- Spouse: Alan Best
- Children: 2
- Writing career
- Notable work: Bird Eat Bird (2010)
- Notable awards: Commonwealth Writers' Prize; 2011 Bird Eat Bird

Katrina Best is a British-born short story writer who lives in the United Kingdom.

== Biography ==
Katrina Best is a British-born author who has lived in Canada and the United Kingdom. She is a dual citizen of both countries.

Best published her short story collection Bird Eat Bird in 2010. The work won the Commonwealth Writers' Prize.

After many years in Canada (Vancouver and Montreal), Best currently lives in the UK. She is married to Alan Best. The couple have two children together.

== Works ==
- Bird Eat Bird. Insomniac Press. 2010. ISBN 978-1-897178-94-2.
