= Miyamoto-cho, Tokyo =

Miyamoto-cho is a pseudonymous neighborhood in Tokyo, the subject of an ethnographic study of urban life in the late 1970s and early 1980s undertaken by the anthropologist Theodore C. Bestor in his book and film, both titled Neighborhood Tokyo. It is most likely the area of Shimo-shimmei and Futaba in Shinagawa Ward. Both names can be seen in the opening of the film.

== See also ==
- Shitayama-cho, Tokyo
