= Shitayama-cho, Tokyo =

Neighborhood in Tokyo, Japan

Shitayama-cho is a pseudonymous Tokyo neighborhood, the subject of a major study of immediate postwar Japanese urban life, undertaken by the British sociologist R. P. Dore, published as City Life in Japan (1958).

== See also ==
- Miyamoto-cho, Tokyo
