= Arthur E. Bestor =

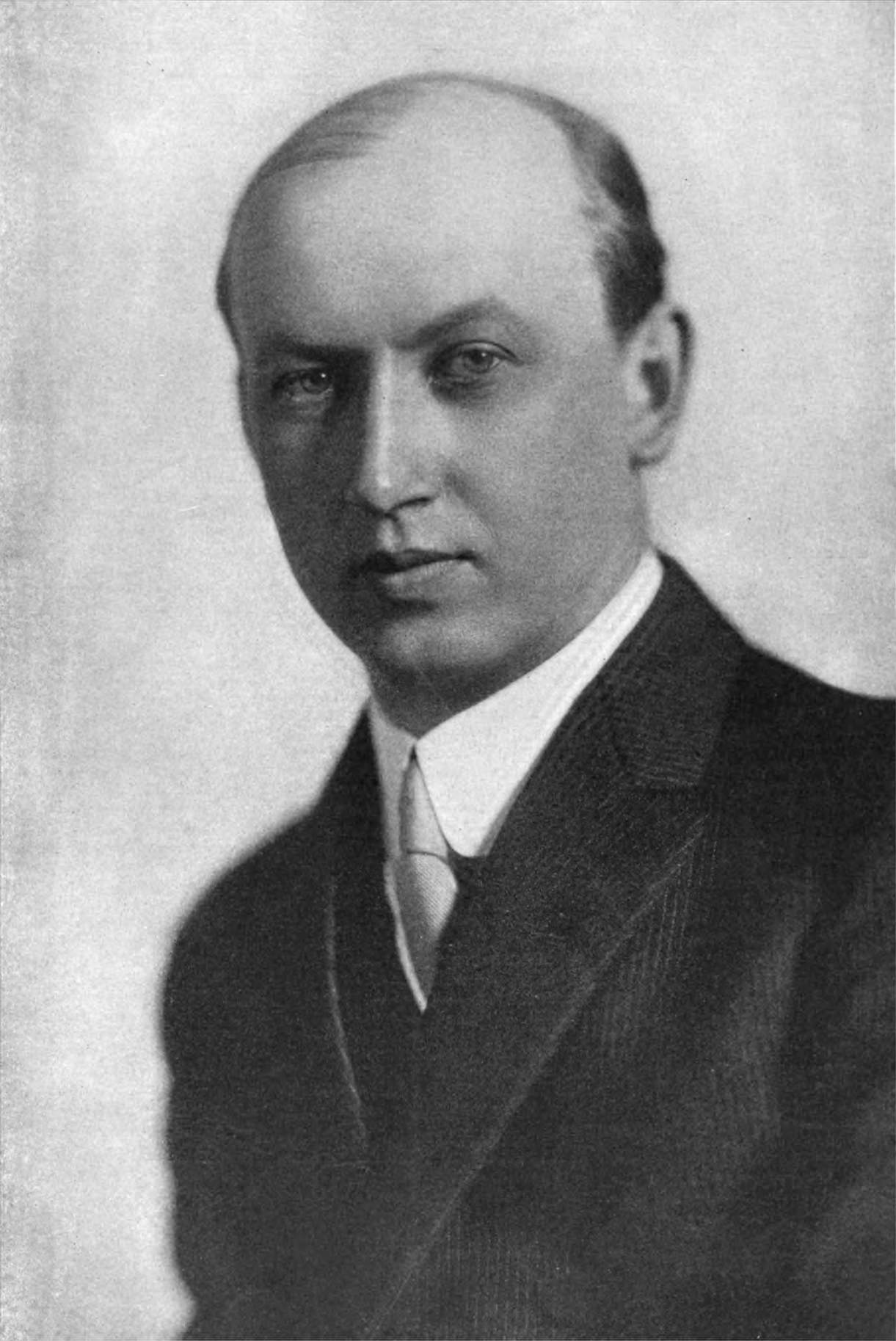
- Born: Arthur Eugene Bestor; 1879; Dixon, Illinois
- Died: February 3, 1944 (aged 64–65); New York, New York
- Occupation: Educator
- Spouse: Jeanette Lemon
- Children: Arthur E. Bestor Jr. Mary Francis Bestor Cram; Charles Lemon Bestor

Arthur Eugene Bestor (1879 – February 3, 1944) was an educator. He served as the President of Chautauqua Institution in Chautauqua, New York, from 1915 to his death in 1944.

== Biography ==
=== Early life ===
Arthur Eugene Bestor was born in 1879 in Dixon, Illinois.

=== Career ===
Bestor became assistant director of the Chautauqua Institution in 1905. Two years later, in 1907, he became director. Since 1915, he served as the President of Chautauqua Institution in Chautauqua, New York, until 1944. He was a proponent of adult education. Under his twenty-nine year administration, the Institution grew from an assembly for teachers and ministers with modest facilities to a wide-ranging summer program with a symphony orchestra, an opera company, a resident repertory theater company, and celebrated lecturers.

=== Personal life ===
He was married to Jeanette Lemon. They had three children:

- Arthur E. Bestor Jr. He was a distinguished professor of American intellectual and constitutional history, and an important critic of American educational practices.
- Mary Francis Bestor Cram. She was a leader of lay organizations in the American Baptist Church and the Young Women's Christian Association, serving as president of the U.S. organization.
- Charles Lemon Bestor. He was a composer of contemporary classical music, a music educator, and professor of music (emeritus) at the University of Massachusetts, Amherst.

=== Death ===
He died on February 3, 1944, in New York City.
