= Arthur Bestor =

American historian (1908–1994)

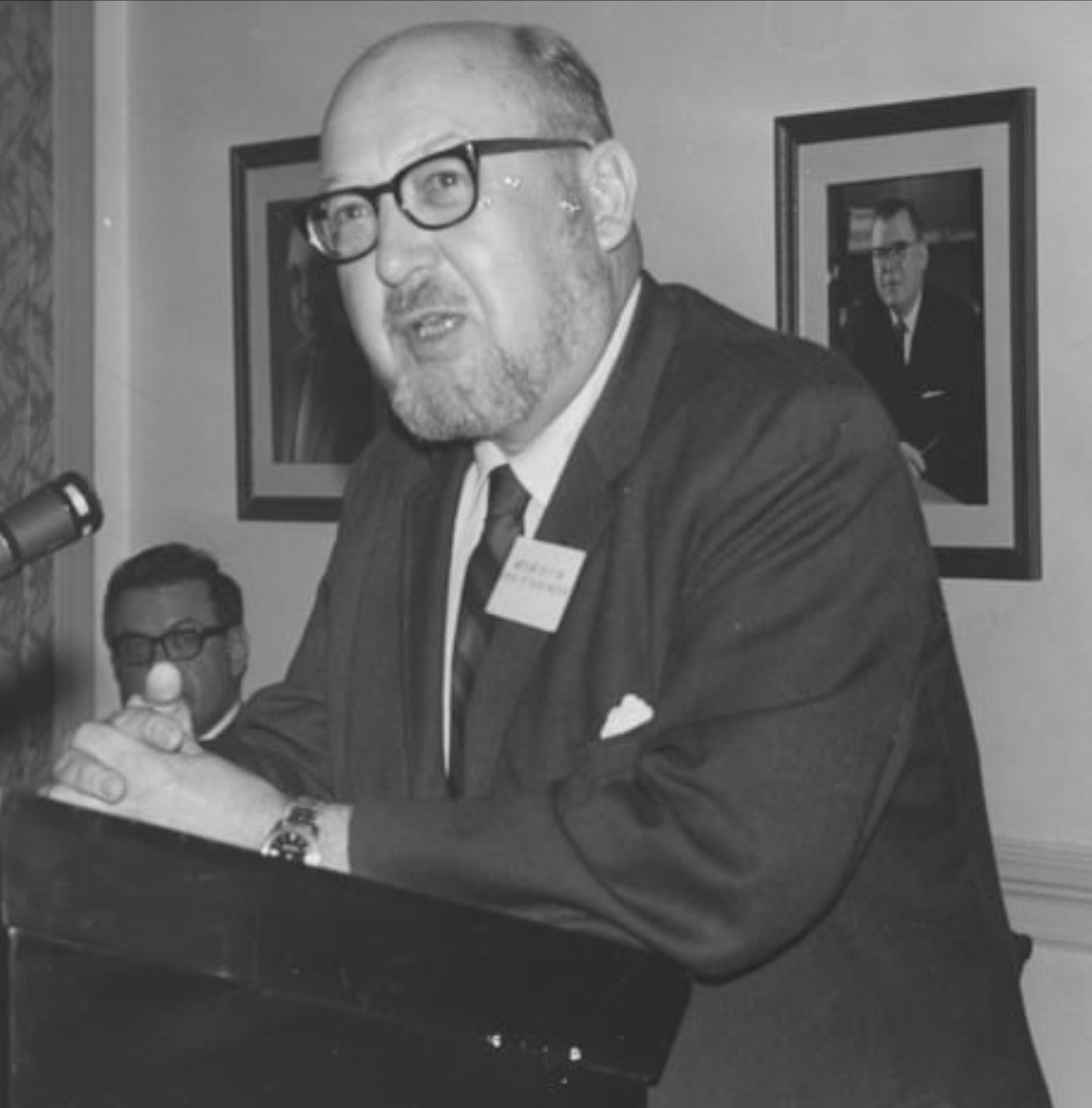
- Born: Arthur Eugene Bestor Jr. September 20, 1908; Chautauqua, New York
- Died: December 13, 1994 (aged 86); Seattle, Washington
- Occupation: Historian
- Spouse: 3, including Dorothy Alden Koch
- Children: William Porter Bestor; Thomas Wheaton Bestor; Theodore C. Bestor
- Parent(s): Arthur E. Bestor; Jeannette Lemon

Academic background
- Education: Horace Mann School; Yale University

Arthur Eugene Bestor Jr. (September 20, 1908 – December 13, 1994) was a historian of the United States, and during the 1950s a noted critic of American public education.

== Biography ==
=== Early life ===
Bestor was born on September 20, 1908, in Chautauqua, New York. He was the eldest son of Arthur E. Bestor Sr. and Jeannette Lemon. In 1904-1944 his father was the president of the Chautauqua Institution, an educational and religious community in western New York State.

Bestor was raised and educated in Chautauqua and New York City, where he attended the Horace Mann School. He received his undergraduate and graduate degrees from Yale University (Ph.D. in history, 1938), where he received the John Addison Porter Prize.

=== Career ===
Bestor taught at Teachers College, Columbia University, the University of Wisconsin, Stanford University, and the University of Illinois. In 1963 he joined the faculty of the University of Washington, Seattle, where he taught until his retirement. He was the visiting Harmsworth Professor of American History at Queen's College, Oxford in 1956–57, and taught at the University of Tokyo, Rikkyo University (Tokyo), and Doshisha University (Kyoto) as a visiting professor sponsored by the Fulbright Program in 1967.

Bestor's early research was on the history of 19th-century American utopian and communitarian experimental settlements, especially New Harmony, Indiana, founded by followers of the Welsh communitarian philosopher Robert Owen. Bestor's study of New Harmony was published as Backwoods Utopias. In 1946 he received the prestigious Albert J. Beveridge Award of the American Historical Association for this work.

In the mid-1950s, Bestor became well known in educational circles as a critic of then-common educational doctrines; Educational Wastelands (1953) was his manifesto about declining educational standards. From the late 1950s, his scholarly research shifted to issues of the constitutional basis of sovereignty, the war powers clauses of the US constitution, and the power of impeachment. "The American Civil War as a Constitutional Crisis " is a much noted and quoted essay of Bestor. Until his death in 1994, he published widely in historical and law journals on constitutional history and was several times invited to testify before Congress on constitutional matters. At the time of his death he was working on an intellectual history of European philosophical influences on the framers of the US constitution, with particular focus on the writings of Montaigne.

Bestor was one of the first specialists on American constitutional law to publicly call for the resignation of President Richard M. Nixon, in a piece published in The New Republic in May 1973.

=== Personal life ===
Bestor married his third wife Dorothy Alden Koch in 1951. He had two sons from a previous marriage, William Porter Bestor and Thomas Wheaton Bestor, and one son, Theodore C. Bestor, from his third marriage.

=== Death ===
He died on December 13, 1994, in Seattle, Washington.
