= Sonja M. Best =

Australian-American virologist

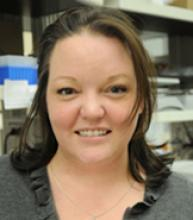
- Education: University of Adelaide (BS); Australian National University (PhD)
- Awards: PECASE (2011)
- Scientific career
- Fields: Viral pathogenesis
- Workplaces: Rocky Mountain Laboratories
- Thesis: Pathogenesis of myxoma virus (1998)

Sonja Marie Best is an Australian-American virologist. She is chief of the innate immunity and pathogenesis section at the Rocky Mountain Laboratories. Best researches interactions between pathogenic viruses and the host immune response using flavivirus as a model.

== Education ==
Best earned a B.S. with majors in immunology and microbiology and a second major in zoology from University of Adelaide. She received her Ph.D. in biochemistry and molecular biology from the Australian National University where she studied the pathogenesis of myxoma virus. In 1999, she conducted her postdoctoral research at Rocky Mountain Laboratories (RML) on the complex role of apoptosis in the replication of parvoviruses.

== Career ==
Best stayed at RML as a research fellow and in 2007, she became a staff scientist. She investigated virus-host interactions involved in flavivirus pathogenesis. It was during this time that she developed her interests in innate immunity and the molecular mechanisms utilized by flaviviruses to evade these critical host responses. In 2009, Best established an independent laboratory as a tenure-track investigator to expand her studies on interactions between pathogenic viruses and the host immune response. She is chief of the innate immunity and pathogenesis section. Best investigates the mechanisms underpinning early immune activation after infection with RNA viruses and how emerging viruses evade these early responses to cause disease. Her virus models include emerging flaviviruses (such as Zika virus and encephalitis) and filoviruses (Ebola virus).

== Awards and honors ==
In 2011, Best was awarded a Presidential Early Career Award for Scientists and Engineers for her work on flavivirus suppression of innate immune responses.
