= Runnymede College =

Coordinates: 40.528392°N 3.632240°W

Location
- Calle Salvia 30; La Moraleja, Alcobendas, Madrid, 28109; Spain

Information
- Motto: Delight, Ornament, Ability
- Established: 1967
- Founder: Arthur F. Powell CBE
- Headmaster: Frank M. Powell
- Gender: Co-educational
- Age: 2 to 18
- Enrollment: 1140 (approximate)
- Houses: Keynes, Locke, Newton, Austen
- Alumni: Old Runnymedians
- Website: runnymede-college.com

Runnymede College is a co-educational private school located in La Moraleja, Madrid, Spain. It was founded in 1967 by Arthur Powell as the first British school in Spain. It is a private non-denominational school offering a British education to boys and girls of all nationalities from the age of two to eighteen.

The education offered follows the English National Curriculum, with pupils taking IGCSEs at the end of Year 11 and their A-levels at the end of Year 13. As of 2010 there were 750 students, with about 50% being from Spanish families and 20% being from British families; there were 37 nationalities in the student body. Warwick Mansell of The Telegraph wrote that Runnymede was "medium-sized" in terms of its student body.

== History ==
Runnymede College was founded as a private senior school in 1967, to provide a British education for English-speaking students of all nationalities who were resident in Madrid. In 1987 the primary school was inaugurated. In 1998 the school moved to its current location.

== Notable alumni ==
Notable alumni include Grand Duchess Maria Vladimirovna of Russia, her son Grand Duke George Mikhailovich of Russia, rugby union England player Simon Shaw, and women's rights activist Elif Shafak.

== See also ==
- British migration to Spain
- Education in the United Kingdom
