= Earl Best =

American activist (1947–2021)

Earl Best (December 26, 1947 – December 27, 2021), a community organizer better known as the "Street Doctor", was a convicted bank robber who spent 10 years in solitary confinement and worked with the poor on the streets of Newark, New Jersey. He founded the Street Warriors organization in 2003. From 2011 until his death in 2021, Best was active preaching nonviolence and delivering blankets, food and supplies to poor people of Newark with his van and on his feet.

== Biography ==
Best grew up in the city's South Ward. He was arrested for bank robbery on June 13, 1983, and subsequently convicted, at least partially on the basis of fingerprint evidence. He spent ten years in solitary confinement while serving 17 years in prison for the robbery. During his solitary imprisonment, he studied spiritual writings, psychology, and law, and he prayed that he would be able to help others if released. In a 2011 interview, he said: "I wanted to make a difference in kids' lives because no one made a difference in mine."

Best was released from prison in 2000. Within three years, he set up an organization called Street Warriors with several other former criminal offenders. Its programs included a summer youth program, mentoring for teenagers living in public housing, gang awareness and intervention programs for adults and youth, and sports activities including a boxing club and a basketball team. For a few years, the organization maintained a center, but the center closed due to a lack of ongoing funding. Best ran his charitable activities out of a donated van.

== Street ministry ==
Best carried goods such as blankets and food in his van, for distribution at places where homeless people or panhandlers congregate. He says that people relax after eating, and he stays to "hang out" with people after he drops off his donations. "Peace is about being relaxed, and you know what, food relaxes people. You don't see people frowning when they eat. Food is peace." The locations Best serves food include abandoned buildings, panhandling sites, prisons, juvenile halls, and schools. He says that part of his street ministry is giving people "food for the mind and for the heart ... If they're about violence, I show them how in my own life I took the energy I put into violence and put it into peace." Best says he gives kids his cell phone number and urges them to phone him first if they ever decide they're going to "do something bad." His other charitable activities for young people include organizing a beach trip for 60 teenagers to celebrate Father's Day.

== Awards and recognition ==
Earl Best has received various awards, and has been cited in news stories about crime in Newark. In 2008, Best was unexpectedly honored by GQ Magazine at its Gentlemen's Ball in New York City, receiving an award from actor Forest Whitaker. In 2009, Best eulogized a fellow anti-violence activist, Yusuf Shabazz, who died from gunshot wounds at age 22. Shabazz had been arrested for selling drugs at age 16, but had managed to turn his life around. He received training in film editing from a non-profit youth group, Aspira, and began to make films about ending gang violence. In May 2011 Best was a featured speaker at the 2011 Newark Peace Education Summit, an international conference on nonviolence that also featured the Dalai Lama.

== Death ==
Best died on December 27, 2021, at an extended care facility at the age of 74 after a long battle from cancer. His death was later announced the next day. He was survived by his son, sisters, nieces, and nephews. Newark Mayor Ras Baraka said in a tribute posted on Instagram that "A lot of people benefited from his road to self-improvement and his road to self-discovery." A memorial service took place on January 14, 2022, where he was later laid to rest at the Fairmount Cemetery in Newark hours later.

== Quote ==
I have met people from all over the world that touched me, and asked me, 'Street Doctor, what does peace mean to you?' And this is what it means to me: Proper education. Always correct errors.

— Earl Best, at 2011 Newark Peace Education Summit
