= Associated Kyoto Program =

The Associated Kyoto Program (AKP) is an independent study abroad program for undergraduate students located in Kyoto, Japan on the Doshisha University campus. It is a non-profit organization that is sponsored by 13 schools: Amherst College, Bates College, Bucknell University, Carleton College, Colby College, Connecticut College, Mount Holyoke College, Oberlin College, Pomona College, Smith College, Wesleyan University, Williams College, and Whitman College. Program of study includes Japanese Language courses and electives focused on Japan's cultural history.
