= Kyoto Consortium for Japanese Studies =

- 京都アメリカ大学コンソーシアム (Kyōto Amerika Daigaku Konsōshiamu)
- Type: Study-Abroad Program
- Established: 1989
- Location: Kyoto, Kyoto Prefecture, Japan
- Website: www.kcjs.jp
- Nickname: KCJS

The Kyoto Consortium for Japanese Studies (KCJS; Japanese: 京都アメリカ大学コンソーシアム) is an intensive, in-country program for the study of Japanese language and culture located in Kyoto, Japan. Operating under the auspices of 13 US universities, KCJS delivers summer, semester, and year-long curricula that are academically rigorous and culturally immersive. KCJS is based in the center of Kyoto on the campus of Doshisha University. Students engage in rigorous language and disciplinary courses that lay the foundations for linguistic fluency and cultural literacy.

As of 2019 KCJS has educated over 750 students.

Columbia University's Center for Undergraduate Global Engagement provides lead administration on the US side, handling admissions and fees.

KCJS is open to undergraduates from all institutions, both within and outside the consortium.

== Consortium members ==
- Boston University
- Brown University
- University of Chicago
- Columbia University/Barnard College (current administrating university)
- Cornell University
- Emory University
- Harvard University
- University of Pennsylvania
- Princeton University
- Stanford University
- Washington University in St. Louis
- Yale University
- University of Virginia

== Notes ==
=== See also ===
- Kyoto
- Japanese language
- Study abroad
