= Andy Best =

English footballer (born 1959)

Personal information
- Full name: Andrew Keith Best
- Date of birth: 5 January 1959 (age 67)
- Place of birth: Dorchester, England
- Position: Right winger

Senior career*
| Years | Team | Apps | (Gls) |
| ????–1984 | Dawlish Town | | |
| 1984–1985 | Torquay United | 18 | (2) |
| 1985–???? | Teignmouth | | |
- * Club domestic league appearances and goals

Andrew Keith Best (born 5 January 1959) is an English former professional footballer.

Best, a right-winger born in Dorchester, Dorset, joined Torquay United in October 1984 from local non-league side Teignmouth. He was one of several players signed for free by Torquay manager David Webb. His league debut came on 23 October 1984 against Scunthorpe United at the Old Show Ground. He made 18 league appearances, scoring twice, before leaving for Dawlish Town in 1985.

In February 2001, the Torquay-based Herald Express newspaper reported that Best was still playing for Teignmouth at the age of 42.
