= Henry Digby Beste =

English writer and aristocrat (1768–1836)

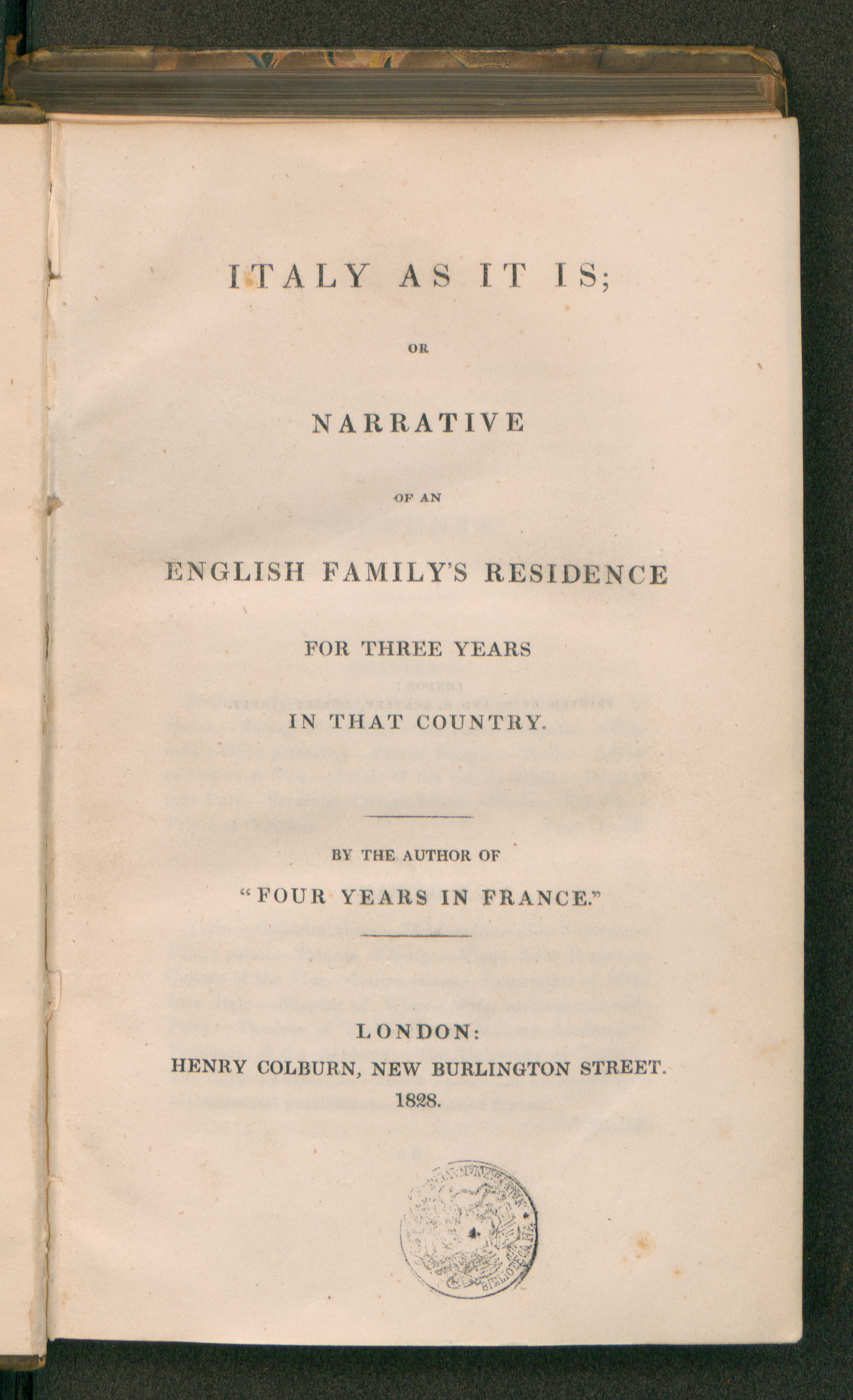
Italy as it is, 1828. From BEIC digital library.

Henry Digby Beste (1768–1836) was an English writer and aristocrat, who converted to Catholicism. He is seen as a precursor to the Oxford Movement.

== Life ==
Beste was born in Lincoln, England on 21 October 1768. His father, Henry Beste, was prebendary of Lincoln Cathedral. His mother, Magdalen, daughter and heiress of Kenelm Digby of North Luffenham in Rutland, claimed to be the representative of the extinct male line of the historic Sir Everard and Sir Kenelm Digby. His father dying in 1782, Henry was sent two years later by his mother to Oxford. He became a commoner of Magdalen College, where he took his B. A. degree in 1788 and his M. A. in 1791. He was afterward elected to a fellowship, which he resigned when the family estates came to him on the death of his mother.

In September 1791, Beste took deacon's orders in the Anglican church, and a little later retired to Lincoln, where he was active as a preacher. Doubts about the spiritual authority of the Established Church sprang up in his mind, which were strengthened by intercourse with Beaumont, then in charge of the small Catholic chapel at Lincoln. As a result, he was received into the Catholic Church by Joseph Hodgson, Vicar-General of the London district, on 26 May 1798.

In 1800, he married Sarah, daughter of Edward Sealy, with whom he became the father of the author John Richard Digby Beste (e. g. Modern Society in Rome. A novel, 1856). He died in Brighton on 28 May 1836.

== Works ==
Beste's first works were a treatise entitled The Christian Religion briefly defended against the Philosophers and Republicans of France (octavo, 1793) and in the same year a discourse on Priestly Absolution, which was republished in 1874. The latter anticipated some Tractarian arguments and met with commendation from members of the University of Oxford in 1794. After his conversion, Beste became an occasional contributor to Catholic periodicals. He also travelled abroad and spent several years in France and Italy. Cardinal Wiseman met him at Rome in the Jubilee of 1825, and mentions him in his "Last Four Popes" (Boston, 1858, p. 245). In 1826 Beste's English Family's Residence covers that period, preceded by some account of the author's conversion to Catholicism. Two years later he wrote a similar book on his stay in Italy. Ten years after his death appeared his last work, Poverty and the Baronet's Family, a Catholic Story (12mo, 1846).
