= Alan Best (politician) =

American politician and businessman

Alan Best (January 8, 1906 – April 23, 1953) was an American politician and businessman.

Best was born in St. Louis, Missouri. He lived in Chicago, Illinois with his wife and family and was involved in the merchandise business. Best was involved with the Republican Party. He served in the Illinois House of Representatives from 1947 until his death in 1953. Best died at the Illinois Masonic Hospital in Chicago, Illinois, having been a patient for five weeks.
