= Simon Shaw =

English rugby union player (born 1973)

Simon Shaw MBE
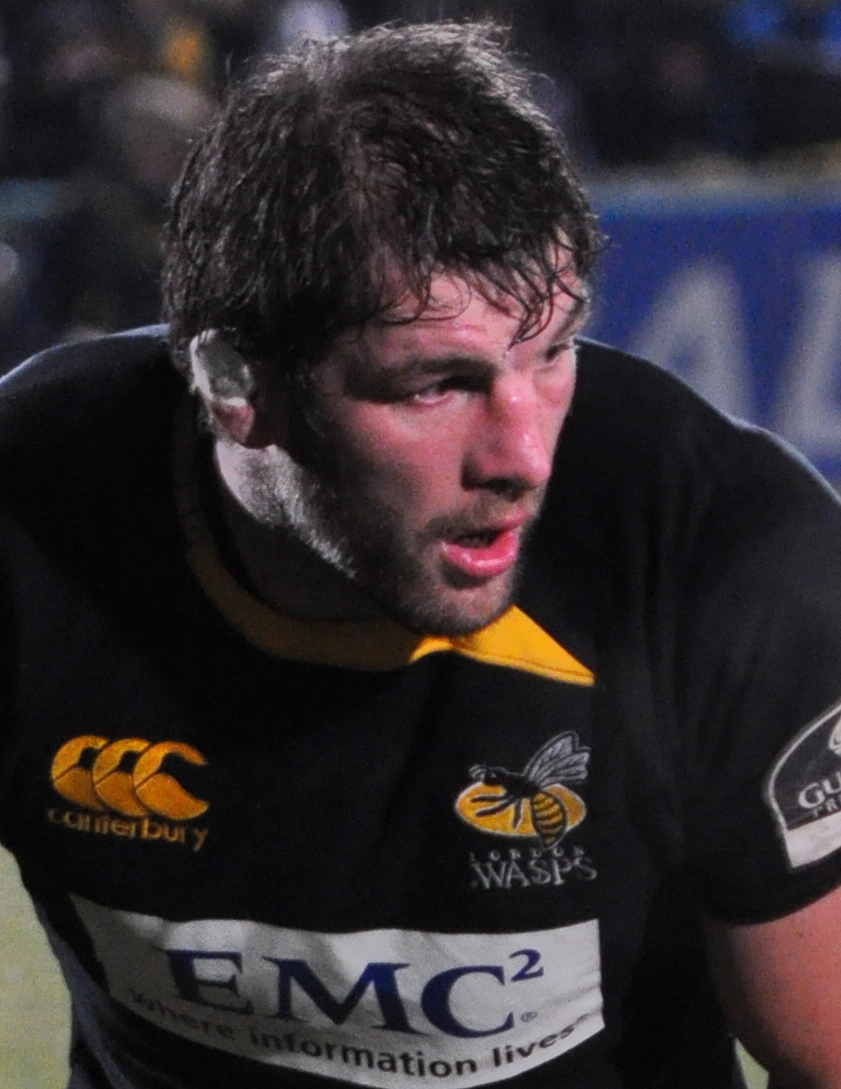
- Shaw in 2010
- Born: Simon Dalton Shaw; 1 September 1973 (age 53) Nairobi, Kenya
- Height: 2.04 m (6 ft 8 in)
- Weight: 123 kg (19 st 5 lb; 271 lb)
- School: Runnymede College; Godalming College
- University: University of the West of England

Rugby union career
- Position: Lock
- Current team: Retired
Youth career
- Cranleigh RFC
Senior career
Years	Team	Apps	(Points)
1990–1997	Bristol		
1997–2011	London Wasps	355	(128)
2011–2013	Toulon	41	(0)
- Correct as of 5 December 2011
International career
Years	Team	Apps	(Points)
1996–2011	England	71	(10)
1997, 2005, 2009	British & Irish Lions	2	(0)
- Correct as of 27 August 2011

Simon Dalton Shaw (born 1 September 1973) is an English former rugby union player. He played as a lock for Bristol, London Wasps and Toulon. He won 71 caps for England between 1996 and 2011 and two for the British & Irish Lions, with whom he toured three times.

== Early life ==
Shaw was born 1 September 1973 in Nairobi, Kenya. He was educated at Runnymede College in Madrid and at Godalming College in Surrey. He played for Bristol at 17, despite not taking up the game seriously until he was 16, after his family had moved to England from Spain. He also played for Cranleigh Rugby Club.

Shaw represented England at various levels including students and Under-21s. At 2.04 m (6 ft 8 in), he is one of the tallest men to have played for England.

== Club career ==
Shaw played for Bristol at the age of 17. He joined London Wasps in 1997. Wasps won the Tetley's Bitter Cup in 1999 and retained it the following season with a victory over the Northampton Saints. Playing against Bath in August 2000, Shaw became the only lock in the Premiership to have scored a drop goal.

In the 2002–03 Zurich Premiership Shaw won the Premiership for the first time, defeating Gloucester in the final. That season Shaw also won his first European silverware with victory against Bath in the 2002–03 Parker Pen Challenge Cup. The 2003–04 Zurich Premiership season saw Wasps retain their Premiership crown and win the 2003–04 Heineken Cup, their first Heineken Cup title.

The 2004–05 season saw Wasps win the Premiership for a third season in a row. The following season Wasps defeated the Scarlets to win the Powergen Cup.

Wasps defeated Leicester Tigers in the final of the 2006–07 Heineken Cup to become European Champions for the second time.

The following 2007–08 season saw Wasps defeat Leicester Tigers in a final again to regain the Premiership title.

In May 2008, playing against Leeds Carnegie in the last match of the regular season, Shaw became the first player ever to play in 200 Premiership matches.

In November 2011, Shaw decided to finish his career overseas and signed for French club, RC Toulonnais.

== International career ==
He won his first England cap against Italy in 1996. The following year Shaw was picked for the successful 1997 British Lions tour to South Africa. A spate of injuries and Wasps' indifferent form in his first season at the club cost him his England place and although he regained his place in the England squad for the following summer's tour, he was forced to withdraw with a long-standing back injury.

During the 2000 Six Nations Championship, he had to step in for the injured Martin Johnson. He earned his 20th cap during the 2003 Six Nations Championship, a tournament which saw England win the Grand Slam. Shaw played in all three 2003 Rugby World Cup warm up matches. He was not named in the original 30-man squad but was flown out to Australia due to an injury to Danny Grewcock, earning him an MBE as part of the World Cup-winning team. He keeps this in a drawer as he feels he didn't "win" it as he never played in a test.

Shaw was called up to the squad for the 2005 British & Irish Lions tour to New Zealand after Irish lock Malcolm O'Kelly aggravated a groin injury in training.

Shaw was selected as a member of the England 2007 World Cup squad. He played the full 80 minutes in the final.

Shaw was selected by the British & Irish Lions for their 2009 tour of South Africa, his third Lions tour. He was the oldest person to be selected and to play for the Lions. He won his first Lions cap in the second test against South Africa at Loftus Versfeld, Pretoria and he was named man of the match. During the third test in Johannesburg he was yellow-carded for foul play when he knee-dropped Fourie du Preez. In 2004 he was red-carded for a similar offence against New Zealand.

In August 2011, he was selected as part of England's squad for the 2011 Rugby World Cup.

In 2011, Shaw became a director of a rugby hospitality company.
