= Eleanor Best =

British painter

- Born: 1875; Amport, Hampshire, England
- Died: 1957 (aged 81–82)
- Known for: Portrait and figure painting

Eleanor Best (1875–1957) was a British oil painter known for her portrait and figure paintings.

== Biography ==
Best was born in Amport in Hampshire and studied at the Slade School of Art in London during 1909. She continued to live in London throughout her life, settling in Richmond.

Best exhibited at the Royal Academy several times, with the New English Art Club and also at the Royal Society of Arts and the Royal Society of Painter-Etchers and Engravers. She also exhibited in the United States and Sweden. The Contemporary Art Society hold examples of her work and she was included in the 1986 Slade Ladies exhibition held by the Parkin Gallery. From 1928 to 1930 Best exhibited at the Salon d'Automne in Paris. For several years she was a member of the Royal Society of Marine Artists.
