= Beste Toparlak =

Turkish harpist

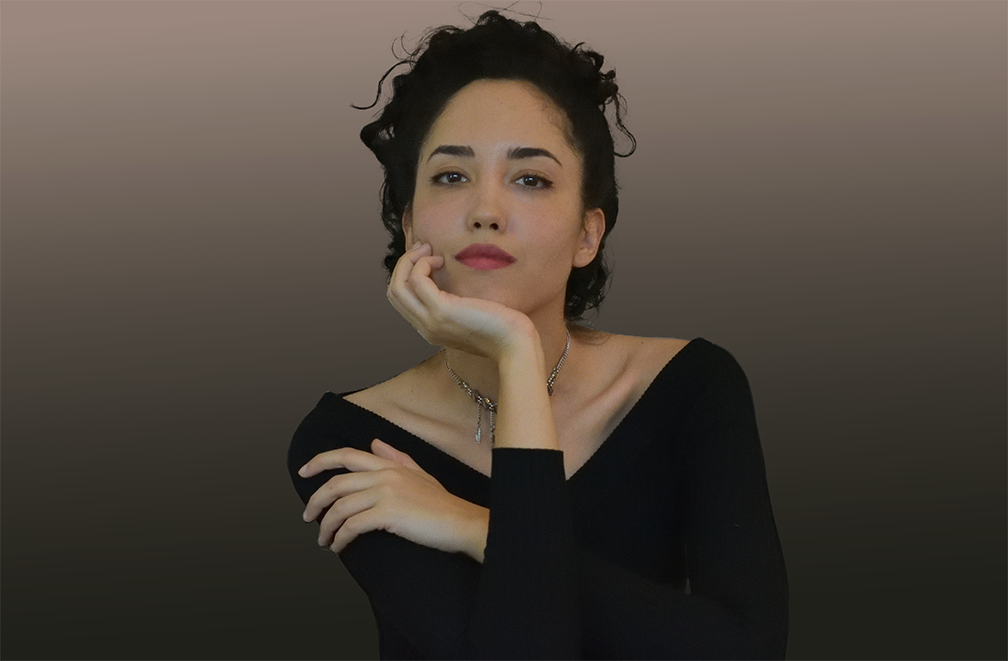
- Born: 1988 (age 37–38); Istanbul
- Occupation: Harpist

Aysan Beste Toparlak (born c. 1988) is a Turkish classical harpist.

== Early life and education ==
She was born in Istanbul, has an educational background that is deeply rooted in classical music and harp performance.

She began her music studies at the age of eight with pianist Yevgenia Tarasova in Almaty, Kazakhstan.

Upon returning to Turkiye, she was admitted to the Harp Department of Ankara State Conservatory at Hacettepe University in 1999. During her pre-college and undergraduate studies, she worked with notable harpists like Bahar Goksu and Mujgan Aydin, graduating in 2009 with high honors.

She continued her education with a Master of Music degree from the Hochschule für Musik und Theater Hamburg, under the guidance of Xavier de Maistre, a well-known harp soloist and former principal harpist of the Vienna Philharmonic. She graduated in 2013.

She pursued an Artist Diploma at the Jacobs School of Music at Indiana University, where she studied with distinguished professors like Susann McDonald, Elizabeth Hainen and Elzbieta Szmyt. This degree is often considered a post-master's professional degree in music, indicating her continued commitment to advancing her skills and knowledge in harp performance.

== Career ==
She has built a notable career as a harpist, with a focus on classical music, though she's versatile enough to perform in various musical genres. Here's an overview of her career:

She has worked with several orchestras, including:

- Hamburg State Opera
- NDR Symphony Orchestra
- RIAS Symphony Orchestra (Berlin)
- Philharmonie der Nationen (Hamburg)
- Bilkent Symphony Orchestra, where she served as Principal Harp for two seasons
- Presidential Symphony Orchestra
- Charlotte Symphony Orchestra (as a substitute harpist)
- Asheville Symphony Orchestra (as guest principal harpist)
- Hilton Head Symphony Orchestra
- Savannah Philharmonic Orchestra

She is recognized for her solo performances as well. She has played in prestigious venues across Europe and the United States, including Berlin Philharmonie, Hamburg Laeiszhalle, and various concert halls in cities like Munich, Frankfurt, and Bremen.

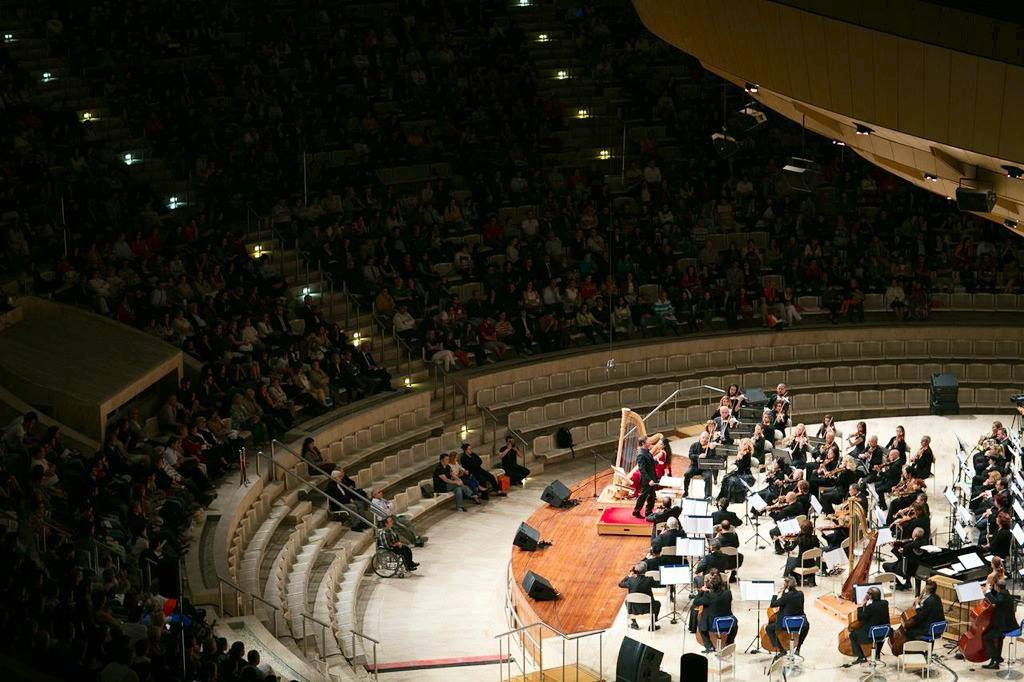

== Some of Notable Performances ==
- 2012, Concert Series with CPE Bach Chor, Hamburg
- 11 June 2013, Film Musics Concert with Bilkent Symphony Orchestra
- 03-4 January 2014, Gliere Harp Concerto with Eskisehir Symphony Orchestra
- 10 May 2014, Gliere Harp Concerto with Bilkent Symphony Orchestra

== Recordings ==
- George Frideric Händel: Harp Concerto in B-Flat, Op. 4, No. 6 with the Bruch Chamber Orchestra.
- Granados: Valses Poeticos

== Awards and Competitions ==
Matinee Musicale-Indianapolis Competition: Winner in the instrumental category in 2017.

Medallion International Artists Competition: Gold Medalist in 2018

== Personal life ==
She lives in Charlotte, NC, USA.
