= Eike Best =

German computer scientist

Eike Best (born 13 March 1951) is a German computer scientist, best known for his contributions to concurrency theory.

== Early life and education ==
Eike Best was born in Neustadt an der Weinstraße. During his childhood, he lived in Argentina, Germany, and Turkey, where his father worked as high school teacher. Best received a high school diploma from the German School of Istanbul in 1969, a Diploma in Computer Science from the Technische Hochschule Karlsruhe in 1974, and a PhD from Newcastle University in 1981 for a dissertation on semantics, verification, and design of concurrent programs, supervised by Peter Lauer and Brian Randell. He habilitated in 1988 at the University of Bonn with a thesis on causal semantics of non-sequential programs.

== Career and contributions ==
Best was research assistant in Carl Adam Petri's research group at the Gesellschaft für Mathematik und Datenverarbeitung near Bonn (1981–1988), and professor in the Computer Science departments at the University of Hildesheim (1989–1996) and the Carl von Ossietzky University of Oldenburg (1996–2018), where he headed the Group for Parallel Systems. During his Bonn period he developed Petri's theory of non-sequential processes together with César Fernández, and contributed to the theory of free-choice Petri nets. During his Hildesheim and Oldenburg periods he developed the Petri Box Calculus, a process algebra with a Petri net semantics, together with Raymond Devillers and Maciej Koutny. During the last years of his career in Oldenburg he worked on the automatic synthesis of Petri nets from transition systems.

In the 1990s, Best was one of the founders of CONCUR, the International Conference on Concurrency Theory, together with Jos Baeten, Kim Larsen, Ugo Montanari, and Pierre Wolper. Moreover, Best was coordinator of the DEMON and CALIBAN projects, funded by the European Community. He acted as dean of the Computer Science Faculty from 2000 to 2002 and became director of the Computer Science Department at University of Oldenburg in 2009.

== Selected publications ==
Eike Best is the author and co-author of multiple books in computer science, including:

- Best, Eike; Devillers, Raymond; Koutny, Maciej (2001), Petri Net Algebra, EATCS Monographs on Theoretical Computer Science Series, Springer, ISBN 3-540-67398-9
- Best, Eike (1996), Semantics of Sequential and Parallel Programs, International Series in Computer Science, Prentice Hall, p. 356, ISBN 0-13-460643-4
- Best, Eike; Fernández, César (1988), Nonsequential Processes: A Petri Net View, EATCS Monographs on Theoretical Computer Science Series, vol. 13, Springer, p. 130, ISBN 0-387-19030-9
