= Hagafen Cellars =

Coordinates: 38.363534°N 122.291666°W

- Key people: Ernie Weir; Irit Weir.
- Products: wine
- Production output: 8000 cases

Hagafen Cellars is a winery located in the Napa Valley. Founded in 1979, it was the first kosher winery in California, and is "the first of the upscale kosher brands." The winery is owned and operated by winemaker Ernie Weir and his wife, Irit Weir.

== Wines ==
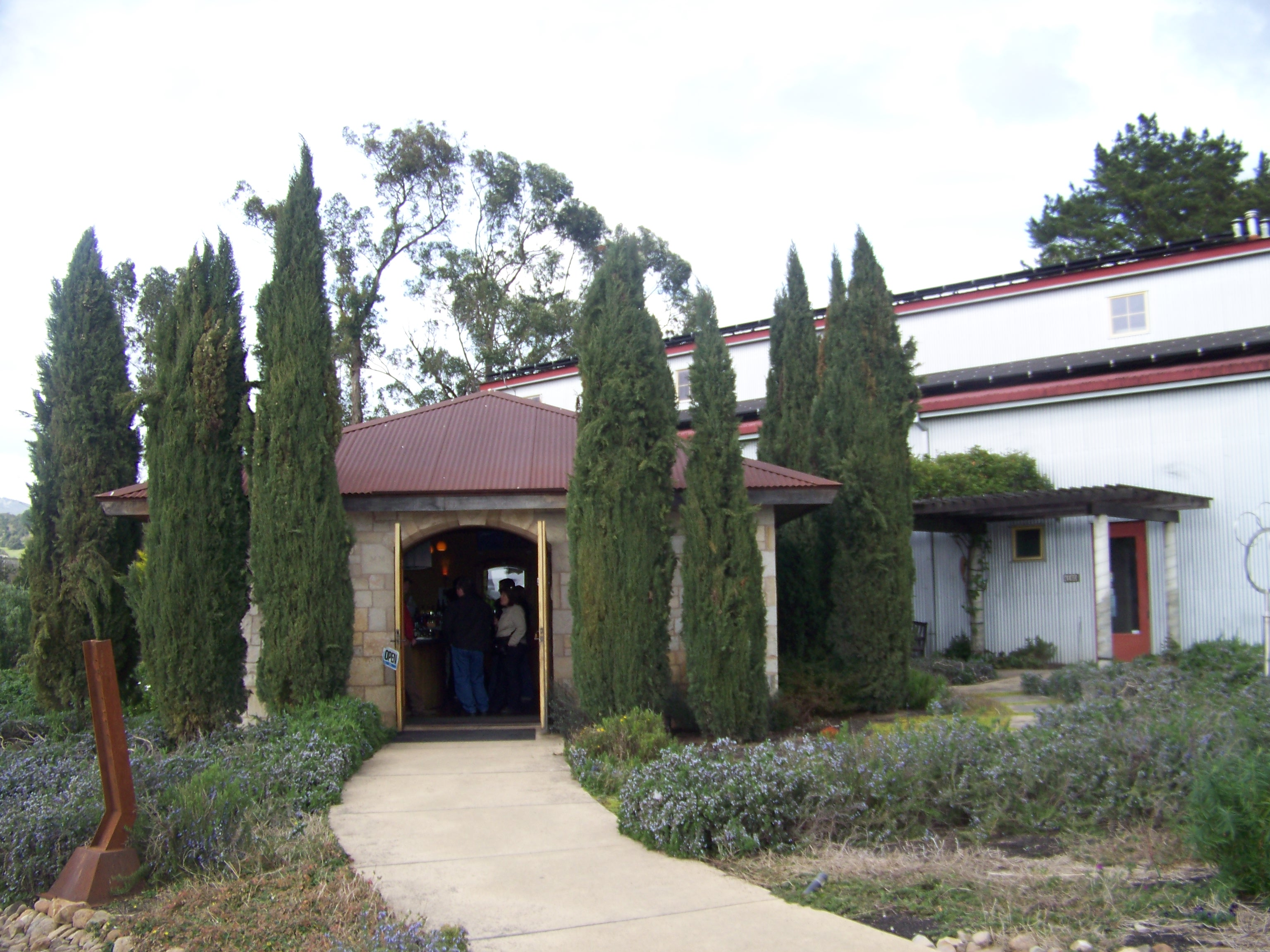
Hagafen Cellars

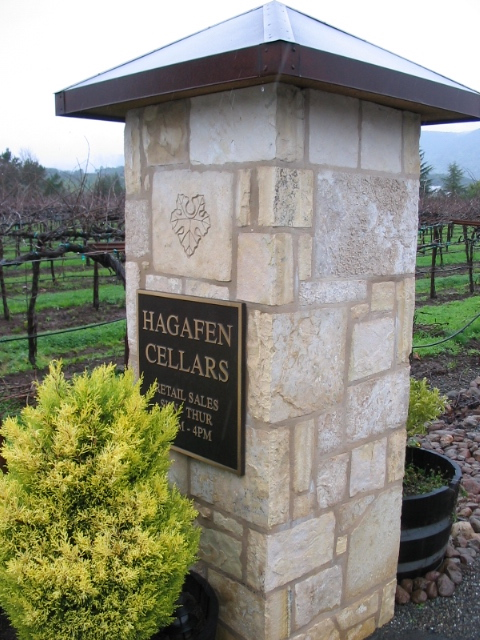
Hagafen Cellars column in 2005

Many wine writers praise Hagafen wines, writing for example that the winery makes "a broad selection of highly recommended kosher wines". Hagafen wines have been called "sophisticated, classic and correct", and are "rated as some of the best kosher wines in the world".

Hagafen's red wines include Cabernet Sauvignon, Syrah, Zinfandel, Cabernet Franc, Merlot, and Pinot noir. Their white wines include Chardonnay, Sauvignon blanc, Riesling, and Rousanne. They also produce brut cuvée sparkling wines, and a Vin Gris Rosé.

Wines are sold under three labels. Hagafen is the main label, Prix is the premium label and Don Ernesto is the label used for their more economical offerings.

The majority of the grapes used are grown in the Napa Valley American Viticultural Area, although the Rousanne comes from Lodi, and some of the Riesling comes from Lake County.

Like many Napa Valley wineries, Hagafen emphasizes Cabernet Sauvignon, and those wines have been favorably received by wine critics and writers for decades. In 1990, The New York Times reported that "in conjunction with the International Jewish Festival in New York, a group of wine experts evaluated more than 125 kosher wines. The panel selected the Hagafen Cellar 1987 cabernet sauvignon from California as the gold medal winner." Sixteen years later, two wine writers for The Wall Street Journal wrote, "We feel strongly that you simply can't go wrong with a Hagafen Cabernet Sauvignon." In reviewing a Hagafen Cabernet Sauvignon, a wine writer for The Washington Post wrote, "Classic, rich and powerful, this is a real Napa Cab at an optimal stage of maturity".

Smaller in production, Hagafen's Rousanne is described as "a white wine that blends the tart freshness of a sauvignon blanc with the richness of a chardonnay, made from a "less familiar variety". "

About one-sixth of Hagafen's production is Riesling, which is cold fermented in stainless steel tanks. Wine writers with The Wall Street Journal have praised Hagafen Riesling as "one of our favorite American Rieslings – kosher or not – for years", commenting that "Longtime wine lovers like his Riesling because it's a noble grape done right and novices find it unintimidating because it's slightly sweet and relatively low in alcohol. Everyone appreciates that it goes well with a wide variety of foods."

== White House dinners ==
On September 9, 1981, Hagafen Riesling was served at a White House state dinner, held by President Ronald Reagan to honor Israeli Prime Minister Menachem Begin. Hagafen wines have been served at the White House many times over the years, "usually at meals that honored Israeli prime ministers and presidents."

More recently, Hagafen sparking wine was the only alcoholic beverage served at President Barack Obama's annual White House Hanukkah dinner on December 2, 2010. The 500 guests at that Hanukkah party included three Supreme Court justices, members of Congress, rabbis, astronauts and artists.

The official menus of many of these White House dinners "now adorn the walls of the winery's intimate tasting room."

== Winery ==
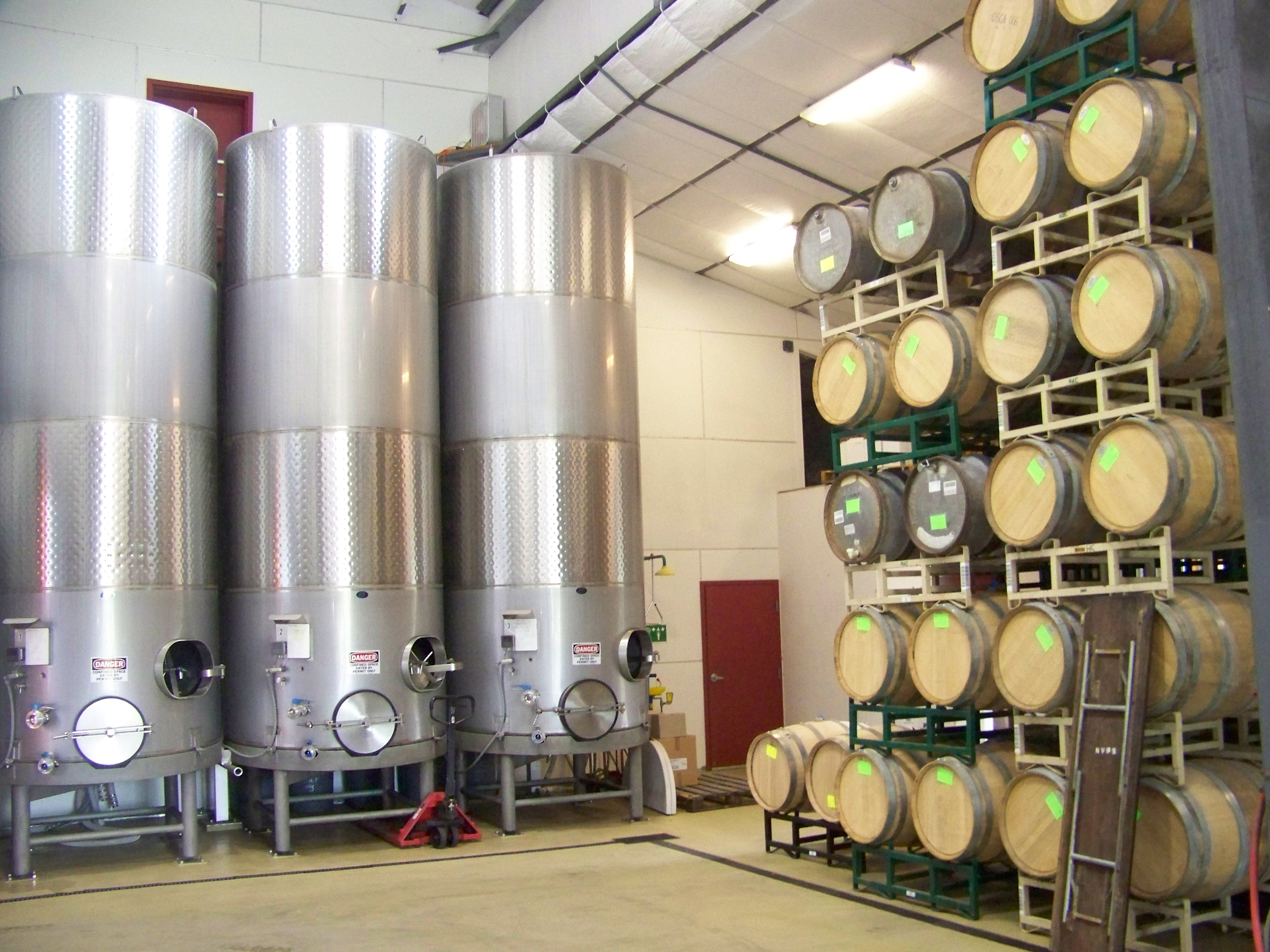
Production facilities for Hagafen Cellars

Hagafen Cellars was founded in 1979 by Ernie Weir and partners Zach Berkowitz, Norm Miller and Rene di Rosa. Initially, the company used the production facilities of the Louis Bartolucci winery, and later used custom crush facilities.

Early in the company's history, Weir decided to "go for the top end of the market." Weir and his wife Irit later gained full ownership of the business.

In 1999, Hagafen announced plans for a new winery. The Hagafen wine production facility on the Silverado Trail opened in 2000 and the stand-alone tasting room opened in 2002. The winery complex has been described as: "Set far enough back from the Silverado Trail to make it feel like a heartland farm, Hagafen Cellars marries a homey, no-nonsense sensibility with an artistic spirit. The winery's corrugated-steel structure sits side by side with an unusual mix of materials, textures and plantings. The overall effect is one of warmth and originality".

In 2004, vandals hit the winery, opening valves and dumping out $200,000 worth of wine. This included the winery's entire production of its 2002 estate Syrah and 2003 estate Pinot Noir. The incident occurred either late at night on June 1 or early in the morning on June 2. The tanks were located outside the winery, near the main building.

The winery's annual production is approximately 8000 cases, or 100,000 bottles.

== Vineyards ==
Originally, Hagafen purchased all its grapes from other wine grape growers. In 1984, it was reported that "Hagafen Cellars produces kosher wine from some of the best vineyards, such as riesling and chardonnay from Winery Lake Vineyard in the Carneros region of Napa Valley."

In 1986, they purchased their own vineyard, where the winery was later built. Called Weir Family Vineyard II, it consists of 12 acres of Cabernet Sauvignon. Later, they added nine acre Weir Family Vineyard III, with three acres each of Riesling, Cabernet Franc and Syrah. Their own vineyards now yield roughly half of the grapes they use for their annual production.

== Winemaker ==
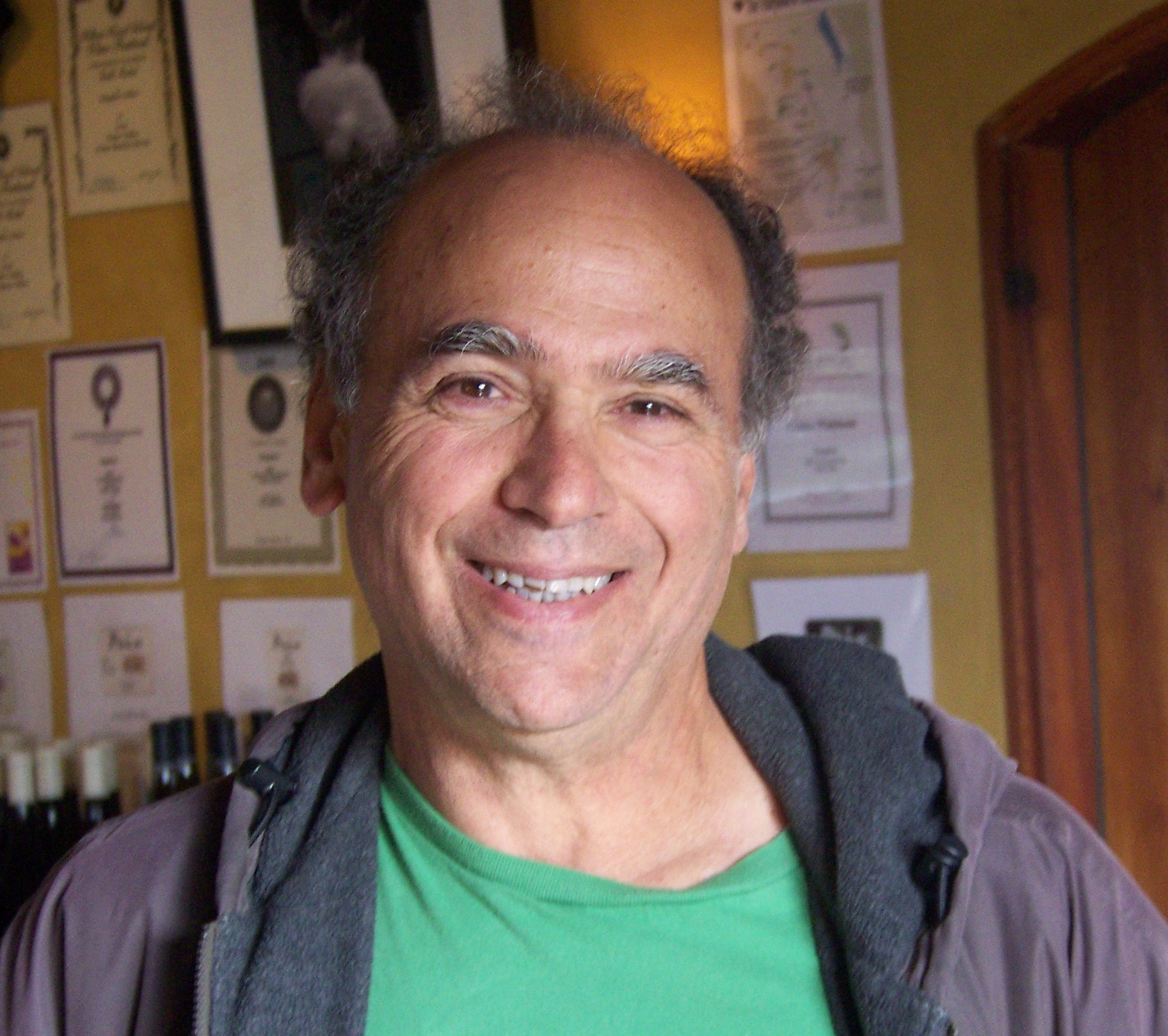
Ernie Weir in 2011

A native of Los Angeles, Ernie Weir was a sociology major at UCLA, and then enrolled in the viticulture program at UC Davis. His first exposure to agriculture came while working on a kibbutz in Israel. From 1973 to 1997, he was employed as a viticulturalist by sparkling wine maker Domaine Chandon in Yountville in the Napa Valley, running Hagafen as a side business for nearly 18 years.

According to Joan Nathan, Weir makes wine "out of cultural conviction". He said that "As a Jew I though it was important to produce a first-rate kosher wine." "As a small producer," Weir said, "I looked for a niche that would make me unique, that would separate me from the 300 other wineries [in the area]."

Weir has done consulting work for Israeli wineries, such as Carmel Winery, Yarden and the Margalit Winery. Weir also "lectures to Israeli winemakers on what he's learned making wine in California." Author Jamie Geller wrote that Weir's "knowledge and candor are remarkable"

In 2008, Weir was the winner of the Al Brounstein Meritorious Service Award, given by nonprofit group L’Chaim Napa Valley in memory of the notable Napa Valley Cabernet Sauvignon leader who founded Diamond Creek Vineyards. Weir was featured in the 2007 documentary film about California' wine industry, called A State of Vine. He served as president of the board of trustees of Napa's Reform synagogue, Congregation Beth Sholom, from 2007 to 2009.

== Kosher standards ==
Hagafen has overcome several significant challenges in making fine wines that comply fully with the Jewish laws of kashrut.

First of all, "the High Holy Days often fall in the middle of peak harvesting and crush periods", and that is the busiest time of the year for Napa Valley winemakers. No work on kosher wines can take place on the sacred days, including Rosh Hashanah and Yom Kippur, so Weir must coordinate his schedule carefully at this time of year, and work whenever he can.

Although he is Jewish, Weir's level of religious observance does not comply with Orthodox Jewish standards, and only such Jews are allowed to do the physical work of producing kosher wines. Accordingly, Weir has to direct and monitor temporary Orthodox Jewish employees on the exact steps to take during production, but he can't do any of the hands-on work himself.

Jewish law also requires that kosher wines that are to be served to observant Jews by non-Jewish waiters must be mevushal, which means "boiled" in Hebrew. Israeli wine critic Daniel Rogov described the common wisdom about the shortcomings of mevushal kosher wines: "nearly everyone knows that that after a few months in bottle, most mevushal (flash pasteurized) wines tend to offer cooked aromas and flavors, and too often remind one more of oxidized fruit compote than of fine wine." Rogov praises Weir's success at the process: "No one is quite sure how Hagafen winemaker Ernie Weir does it, but his are among the very few flash pasteurized wines to have escaped this fate, and his wines, frequently earning scores of 90 or above, tend to be rather long lived. Some may think that shipping kosher wines to Israel is somewhat akin to selling ice to Eskimos, but in this case the Hagafen wines are a most welcome addition to local shelves."
