= Alan Best (filmmaker) =

Canadian animation director and producer

- Born: May 2, 1959 (age 66); Hamilton, Ontario, Canada
- Occupation: Animator
- Spouse: Katrina Best
- Children: 2

Alan Best (born 2 May 1959) is a Canadian animation director and producer.

== Early life ==
Best was born in Hamilton, Ontario. He was educated at St. George's School (Vancouver) and trained at the Paris atelier of French poster artist Paul Colin. He was production trainee on Cet obscur objet du désir, the final film of Spanish-born director Luis Buñuel.

== Career ==
He began his career as an assistant animator working for Hanna-Barbera studios.

He worked on the animated features, Heavy Metal (1981), Pink Floyd The Wall (1982), and at the studios of Halas and Batchelor, Bob Godfrey, TVC, Bill Melendez, and Richard Williams.

He directed the first all-animated music video, (How to Be a) Millionaire for the British pop band ABC.

He was supervising director of the ABC Family sci-fi series Galidor: Defenders of the Outer Dimension.

In 2005, he redesigned Victor, the Just for Laughs festival mascot.

== Personal life ==
He is married to British-born writer Katrina Best (née Barton) with whom he has a son and daughter.

He is the nephew of Bloomsbury Group sculptor/natural historian Alan Best and great-great nephew of British printmaker Frank Morley-Fletcher.

He is a cousin of British portrait painter Glyn Philpot, actors Ronald Colman, Pamela Brown and British diplomat David Gore-Booth.

He is an uncle of Substack founder/CEO Chris Best.
