= David Best (sculptor) =

American sculptor (born 1945)

David Best (born 1945) is an American sculptor. He is internationally renowned and well known for building immense temples out of recycled wood sheets (discarded from making toys and other punch-outs) for the Burning Man festivals, where they are then burnt to the ground in a spectacle of light and heat.

== Career ==
Best received a master's degree in sculpture from the San Francisco Art Institute, where he first took classes at the age of six. His commitment to public art seems rooted in 1960s-era idealism. His works — ceramic sculpture, collages and more — have been shown at the San Francisco Museum of Modern Art, the Oakland Museum, the Crocker Art Museum in Sacramento, the San Jose Museum of Art, di Rosa, and elsewhere.

Best first began collaborating with others, 20 years ago, when he embarked upon a sideline: stripping down vehicles and giving them total sculptural makeovers, using recycled materials and found objects, often retrieved from dumps and dumpsters. Since then, he has created sculptures from the skeletons of 36 cars and two buses, and worked with more than 10,000 people.

Best built his first Burning Man Temple in 2000, The Temple of the Mind. During construction it became a memorial to Michael Hefflin, a member of the crew who died in a motorcycle accident just prior to the event, and as such became a sacred space for remembering others. In 2001, Burning Man helped fund the Temple projects and David, along with Jack Haye who was also responsible for the construction of the Temple of the Mind, built the much larger Temple of Tears. 2001 marked the beginning of a new and profound ritual for the tens of thousands of participants who attend Burning Man each year. After days of writing prayers on the structures, of affixing offerings from one's life such as pictures, paintings, etc., or of leaving the ashes of loved ones, etc. the Temple was burned on Sunday night.

In 2002, Best returned with a new project: the Temple of Joy. In 2003, David departed from the wood temples and created the ornate paper Temple of Honor. In 2004, the Temple of Stars was a quarter mile long and almost 120’ high. David took a break in 2005 and 2006 to work on personal projects, including the Hayes Green Temple in San Francisco. Returning in 2007, David, Tim Dawson and the temple crew built the Temple of Forgiveness. Best originally suggested he might create one more temple in 2010 or 2011, however the 2010 Temple of Flux and the 2011 Temple of Transition were designed and built by other artists. Best returned in 2012 to design and coordinate the building of the Temple of Juno. In 2014, Best and crew constructed the Temple of Grace.

In January and February 2019 Best traveled to Coral Springs and Parkland, Florida to build “The Temple of Time” in remembrance of the 17 lives lost at Marjory Stoneman Douglas High School on February 14, 2018, from a School Shooting. The temple was unveiled on February 14, 2019, and will remain in place until it is burned in May.

In August 2022, Best unveiled "River Arch" in Petaluma, California. The 25-foot metal arch serves as a gateway between downtown Petaluma and the surrounding environment.

== Projects ==
=== Burning Man ===
- Temple of the Mind (2000)
- Temple of Tears (aka Temple of Memory) (2001)
- Temple of Joy (2002)
- Temple of Honor (2003)
- Temple of Stars (2004)
- Temple of Forgiveness (2007)
- Temple of Juno (2012)
- Temple of Grace (2014)
- The Temple (Unnamed Final Contribution) (2016)

=== Other similar projects ===
- Chapel of the Laborer (2005)
- Temple at Hayes Green (2005)
- Detroit Dream Project Temple (2008)
- Broad Street Bridge: Bicentennial Towers (2012)
- Temple of Remembrance - Paradise Ridge Winery & Voight Family Sculpture Foundation (2014)
- Temple at Derry/Londonderry in Northern Ireland (2015)
- Temple at Patricia's Green - Ten Year Anniversary (2015)
- London1666 - London's Burning festival (2016)
- Temple of Time - Marjory Stoneman Douglas High School/Coral Springs and Parkland, Florida - (2019) - 1 year anniversary of the school shooting at Marjory Stoneman Douglas High School where 17 students died
- River Arch - Lynch Creek Trail in Petaluma, California.

== See also ==
- Burning Man
