= Charles L. Bestor =

American composer

Charles Lemon Bestor (December 21, 1924, New York City – January 16, 2016, Amherst, Massachusetts) was an American composer of contemporary classical music, professor, and administrator.

== Early life ==
Charles Lemon Bestor was born on December 21, 1924, in New York City. He studied with Paul Hindemith at Yale University. He later studied with Vincent Persichetti and Peter Mennin at the Juilliard School, and independently with Vladimir Ussachevsky. He holds degrees from Swarthmore College (Phi Beta Kappa), the University of Illinois at Urbana-Champaign, and the University of Colorado at Boulder.

== Career ==
He taught at the Juilliard School and the University of Colorado at Boulder. He also served as an administrator at Willamette University, the University of Massachusetts Amherst, University of Utah, and University of Alabama. He finally served as a professor at the University of Massachusetts.

Bestor's compositions have drawn on 12-tone music and jazz. Recordings of his music have been released on the Capstone, Centaur, New Ariel, Living Artist, MSR Classics, Orion, SCI, and Serenus labels.

The Charles L. Bestor Collection is held by the American Music Research Center at the University of Colorado.

== Death ==
Bestor died in his sleep January 16, 2016, at his home in Amherst, Massachusetts.
