= Jerry Best (footballer, born 1897) =

English footballer

Personal information
- Full name: Jeremiah Best
- Date of birth: 22 August 1897
- Place of birth: High Spen, England
- Date of death: 1955 (aged 57–58)
- Height: 5 ft 7 in (1.70 m)
- Position: Goalkeeper

Senior career*
Years	Team	Apps	(Gls)
1919–1920	Mickley Colliery Welfare		
1920–1926	Coventry City	224	(0)
1926–1927	Halifax Town	9	(0)
1927–1928	Rotherham United	25	(0)
- Worksop Town
- Newark Town
- Worksop Town
- * Club domestic league appearances and goals

Jeremiah Best (22 August 1897 – 1955) was an English professional footballer who made over 220 appearances as a goalkeeper in the Football League for Coventry City. He also played League football for Rotherham United and Halifax Town.

== Personal life ==
Best served in the British Army during the First World War.

== Career statistics ==
Appearances and goals by club, season and competition
Club	Season	League			FA Cup		Total	
Club	Season	Division	Apps	Goals	Apps	Goals	Apps	Goals
Coventry City	1920–21	Second Division	23	0	2	0	25	0
Coventry City	1921–22	Second Division	40	0	3	0	43	0
Coventry City	1922–23	Second Division	42	0	1	0	43	0
Coventry City	1923–24	Second Division	42	0	2	0	44	0
Coventry City	1924–25	Second Division	42	0	2	0	44	0
Coventry City	1925–26	Third Division North	35	0	1	0	36	0
Career total			224	0	11	0	335	0
