= Alan Best (sculptor) =

Canadian artist (1910–2001)

Alan Best (1910–2001) was a Canadian sculptor and natural historian, who was curator of Stanley Park Zoo, Vancouver for over 20 years.

== Early life and education ==
Best was born in Chicago, Illinois, in 1910, the third of five sons of English immigrants. Soon after his birth, the family moved to Galiano Island and then to Salt Spring Island, both Gulf Islands of British Columbia. Best attended Shawnigan Lake School for Boys.

== Career ==
Aged 17, Best moved to New York, where he began sculpting animals at the American Museum of Natural History. In 1931–32, he studied in Paris at the Académie Julian. Moving to London, he had various sculpture jobs. He worked for the ceramics company Josiah Wedgwood and Sons for which he designed ornamental figures of athletes and of a mandarin duck, and was assistant to British sculptor Eric Kennington. He worked for the zoologist Julian Huxley as a field worker and as tutor to his sons, and when Huxley was appointed curator of the London Zoo in 1936, Best became assistant zoo curator. During WWII, Best served with the British Merchant Navy. After the war, he returned to British Columbia. He started a children's zoo in 1950, and in 1951, became curator of Stanley Park Zoo, Vancouver. He was a noted authority on penguins, and made several expeditions to the Antarctic to capture different species for the zoo.

== Personal life ==
He was the uncle of the Canadian filmmaker Alan Best.
