= Doshisha University =

Private university in Kyoto, Japan

- 同志社大学
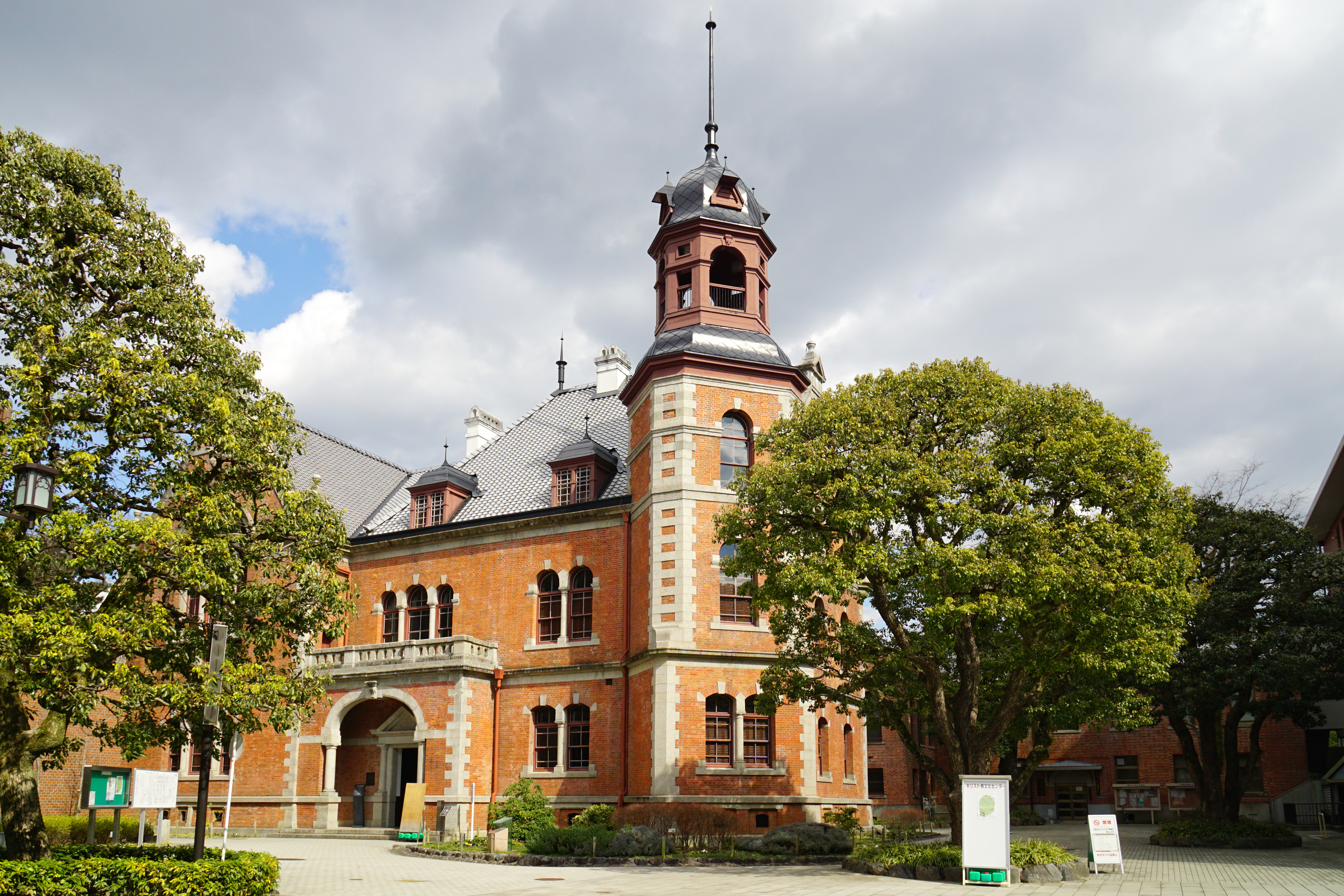
- Motto: Latin: Veritas liberabit vos
- Motto in English: "Truth shall make you free"
- Type: Private
- Established: Founded 1875, chartered 1920
- Endowment: €1 billion (JP¥169.6 billion)
- President: Matsuoka Takashi
- Vice-president: Nobuhiro Tabata, Yasuhiro Kuroki, Tsutao Katayama, Takashi Nishimura
- Faculty: 2,357 (800 full-time, 1557 part-time)
- Undergraduates: 27,024
- Postgraduates: 2,298
- Location: Kyoto, Kyoto Prefecture, Japan; 35°01′47″N 135°45′39″E
- Campus: Urban/suburban, 530 acres (210 ha)
- Colors: White & purple
- Nicknames: Dodai (同大, Dōdai)
- Mascots: Astro Boy (unofficial and historical)
- Website: www.doshisha.ac.jp/en/index.html

Doshisha University (同志社大学, Dōshisha daigaku), also referred to as Dodai (同大, Dōdai), is a private university in Kyoto, Japan. Established in 1875, it is one of Japan's oldest private institutions of higher learning, and has approximately 30,000 students enrolled on four campuses in Kyoto. It is one of Japan's "Global 30" universities and a member of "Kan-Kan-Dō-Ritsu" (関関同立), a group of four leading private universities in western Japan's Kansai region, along with Kansai University, Kwansei Gakuin University, and Ritsumeikan University.

== History ==
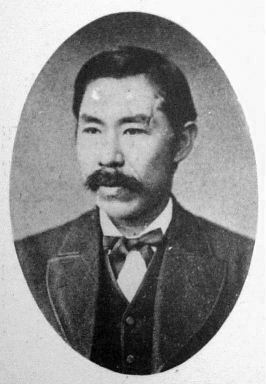
Joseph Hardy Neesima

Doshisha University was founded in 1875 as Doshisha English School by Protestant educator Niijima Jō (新島 襄; also known as Joseph Hardy Neesima), as a school to advance Christian education in Japan. As a young man, Niijima left Japan for the United States in 1864, despite the ban on overseas travel then imposed on Japanese nationals. He studied at Phillips Academy and Amherst College, and returned to Japan in 1874. The next year, Niijima established the Doshisha School. Niijima served as president of the university from 1875 to 1890. Other early university presidents included educator and author Yamamoto Kakuma (1890–1892), Seito Saibara (1899–1902), who was the first Christian member of the Japanese Diet, Kenkichi Kataoka (1902–1904), and prominent chemical engineer Kotaro Shimomura (1904–1907). Tokio Yokoi, Tasuku Harada, and Ebina Danjo were also presidents.

By 1920, Doshisha was granted university status and developed into a full-fledged university in the Anglo-American academic tradition. During World War II, its buildings were given Japanese names and its curriculum was stripped of its pro-Western elements. The prewar conditions were restored after the surrender of Japan. The first graduate degree programs were instituted in 1953.

Amherst College has maintained a close relationship with Doshisha University, and since 1972, Doshisha has collaborated with a consortium of American liberal arts colleges including Amherst to host the Associated Kyoto Program, an 8-month long study abroad program offered every year to students from American colleges and universities. Doshisha also houses the Kyoto Consortium for Japanese Studies, another program affiliated with American universities and centered on advanced Japanese language training.

== Academics and admissions ==
University rankings
Global
THE	General	1501+
QS	General	1201-1400

National

Program rankings
LAW

Doshisha has graduate degree programs in Theology, Letters, Psychology, Business, Global Studies, Law, Economics, Commerce, Policy and Management, Culture and Information Science, Science and Engineering, Life and Medical Sciences, Health and Sports Science, and Social Studies.

The libraries at the Imadegawa and Kyotanabe campuses hold more than 2.5 million volumes.

=== Faculty ===
As of 2013, Doshisha University employs 777 full-time and 1,411 part-time faculty members across its Kyoto campuses. In terms of research, Doshisha has filed the 36th-highest number of patents in the nation.

== Campuses ==
Doshisha University has two main campuses at Imadegawa in central Kyoto and at Kyotanabe in southern Kyoto. Imadegawa is the main campus, located in the former residence of Satsuma Domain. It has been in use since the school was founded. Located in the center of Kyoto, the campus is situated next to Shōkoku-ji, overlooking Kyoto Imperial Palace. Five buildings in the Imadegawa campus have been designated as Important Cultural Properties of Japan, including Doshisha Chapel and Clark Memorial Hall. This campus is primarily for the liberal arts, business (including a graduate school of business), theology, and law faculties. A large learning commons with over 40,000 square meters of space, the Ryoshinkan, was opened in 2012 and included the incorporation of Imadegawa Station, a station on the Karasuma Line of the Kyoto Municipal Subway.

The Kyotanabe Campus was opened in 1986, in Kyōtanabe, Kyoto and is part of Kansai Science City. Over 195 acres (0.79 km^{2}) in area, it serves primarily as the campus for the science and engineering faculties. In 2012, a new Karasuma Campus was established approximately 300 meters from the Imadegawa Campus. The Karasuma Campus houses the International Education Institute, the Graduate School of Global Studies, and the Faculty of Global and Regional Studies.

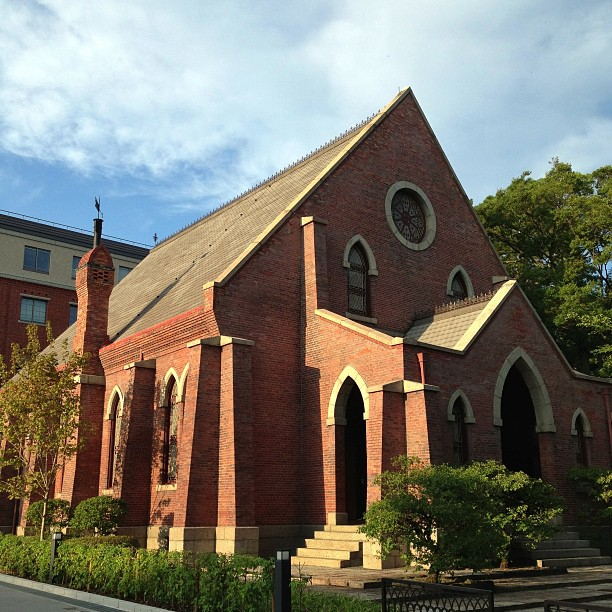
Doshisha Chapel, Imadegawa

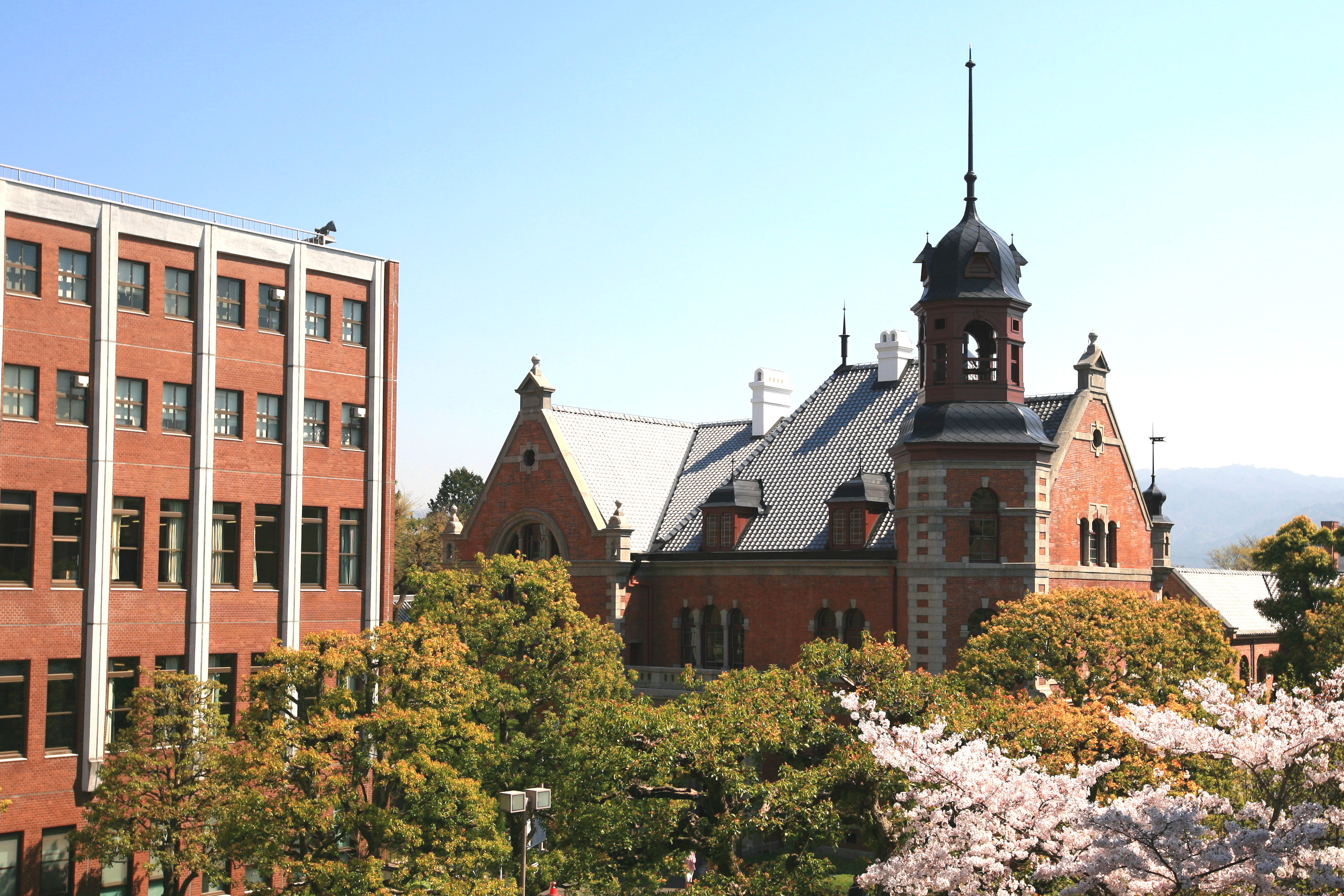
Clark Memorial Hall, Imadegawa

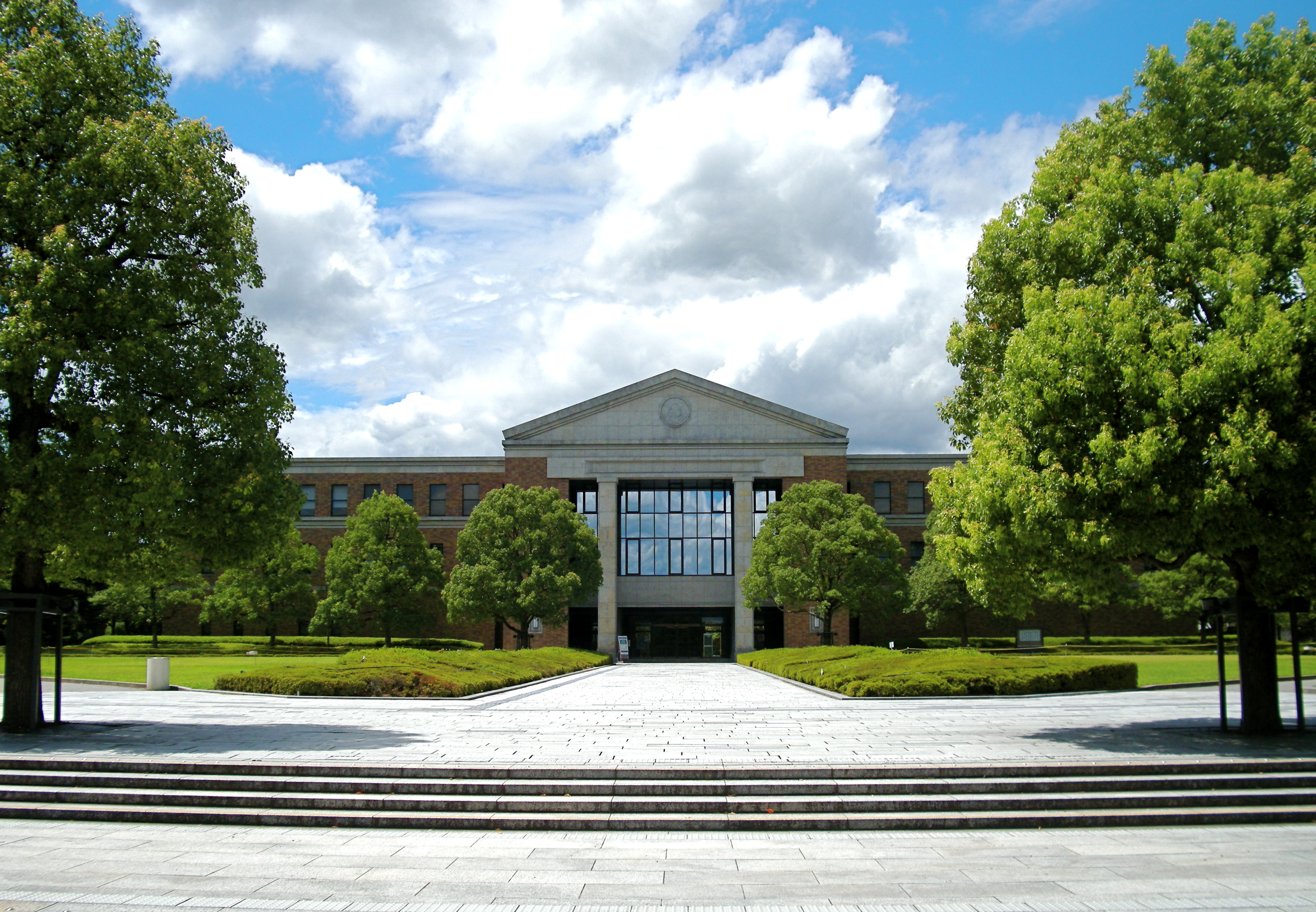
The Learned Memorial Library, Kyotanabe

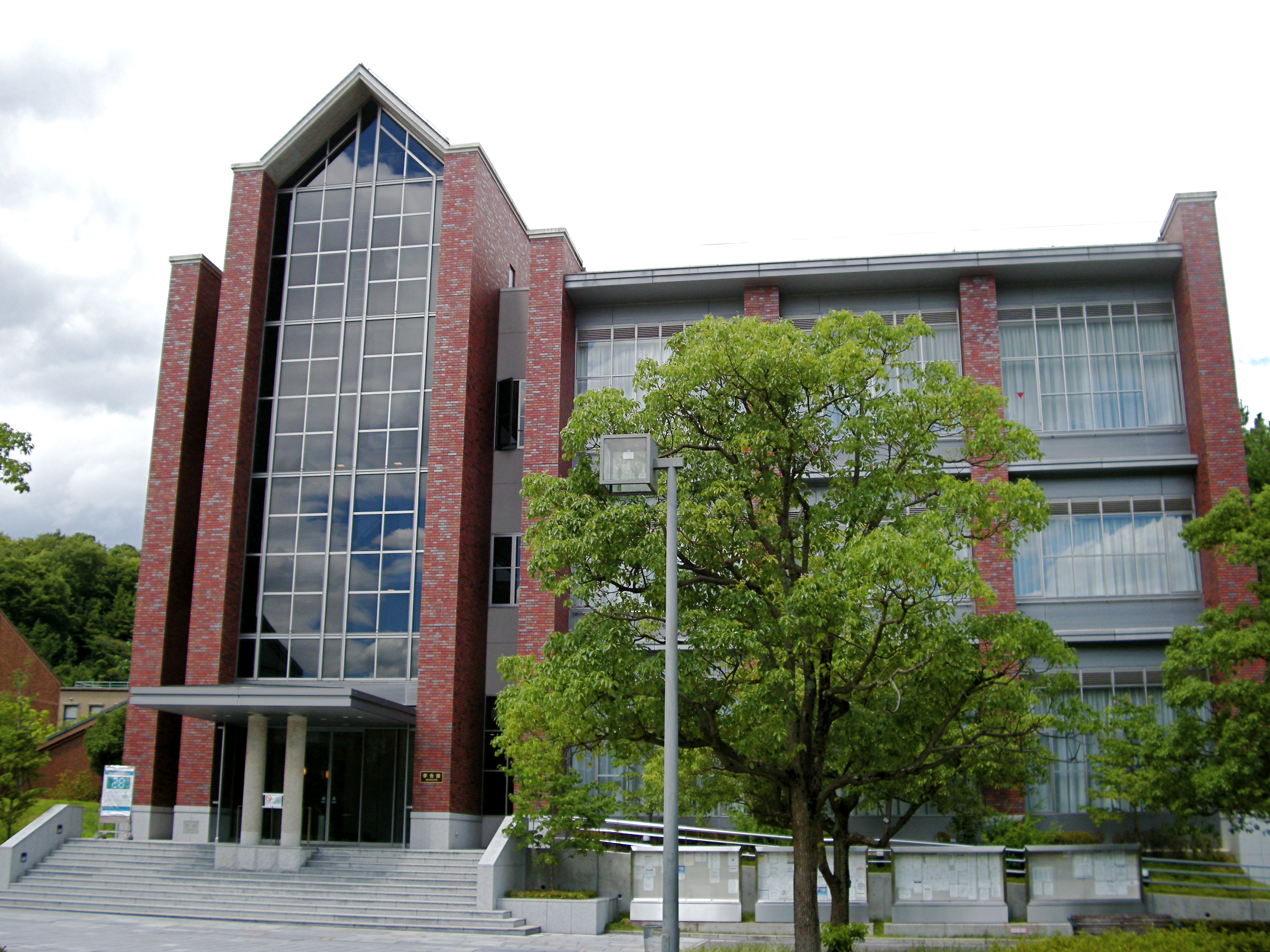
Mukokukan, Kyotanabe

== Student life ==
=== Societies ===
There are over 400 clubs and organizations at Doshisha University.

=== Festivals ===
- Doshisha Eve
- Doshisha Kyotanabe Festival
- Sports Festival

=== Athletics ===
- Doshisha is part of the Kansai Big Six Baseball League. The baseball team is known for their rivalry with Ritsumeikan University.
- Doshisha's rugby team has a long history, and had won 4 championships in All-Japan University Rugby Championship from 1980 to 1984.
- The men's basketball program is noted for its frequent participation in All Japan Intercollegiate Basketball Championship.

== Alumni ==
Doshisha is renowned for its strong connection to business in the Kansai region. According to the 2011 university rankings by Toyo Keizai, 533 alumni served as executives in listed companies. As of 2013, around 25.5% of undergraduates were able to enter one of the top 400 companies in Japan, which ranks eighth nationwide among all private institutions in Japan and first among private universities in Kansai.

Doshisha alumni include Takako Doi, the first female Lower House Speaker in Japan (the highest position a female politician has held in the country's history); Abe Isoo, an early pacifist and feminist and member of the Japanese Diet; Japanese statesman Uchida Kosai, who twice served as acting prime minister; Japanese-language author David Zoppetti; Korean poet Yun Dong-ju; tea master Hansō Sōshitsu; and Gunpei Yokoi, creator of the Game Boy. Takashi Mizutani, founder member of the psychedelic rock band Les Rallizes Dénudés studied there.
