= Bester =

Bester is a surname and may refer to:

People:

- Alfred Bester (1913–1987), American science fiction author
- Allan Bester (born 1964), Canadian retired professional ice hockey goaltender
- John Bester (1927–2010), English translator of modern Japanese non-fiction
- Junior Bester (born 1987), South African rugby union player
- Madge Bester (born 1963), South African believed to be the world's shortest living woman
- Marinus Bester (born 1969), German football player
- Philip Bester (born 1988), Canadian tennis player
- Rolly Bester (1917–1984), American actress and advertising executive, wife of Alfred Bester
- Rudolf Bester (born 1983), Namibian football player
- Ryan Bester (born 1984), Canadian lawn bowler
- Thabo Bester (born 1986), is a South African convicted criminal who escaped from the Mangaung Correctional Centre in South Africa after faking his death in 2022.
- Willie Bester (born 1956), South African artist

Fictional characters

- Alfred Bester (Babylon 5)

== See also ==
- Bestor, a similar surname
- Bester, a minor character from Firefly
