= Freemark Abbey Winery =

Winery in California, United States

Coordinates: 38.52451°N 122.49693°W

- Location: St. Helena, California, USA
- Appellation: St. Helena AVA
- Formerly: Tychson Cellars, Lombarda Cellars
- Founded: 1886
- Key people: Ted Edwards, Winemaker Emeritus; Kristy Melton, Winemaker
- Parent company: Jackson Family Wines
- Cases/yr: 40,000
- Known for: Bosché Vineyard Cabernet Sauvignon
- Varietals: Cabernet Sauvignon, Merlot, Sauvignon blanc, Viognier, Chardonnay
- Distribution: national
- Tasting: Open to Public
- Website: http://www.freemarkabbey.com

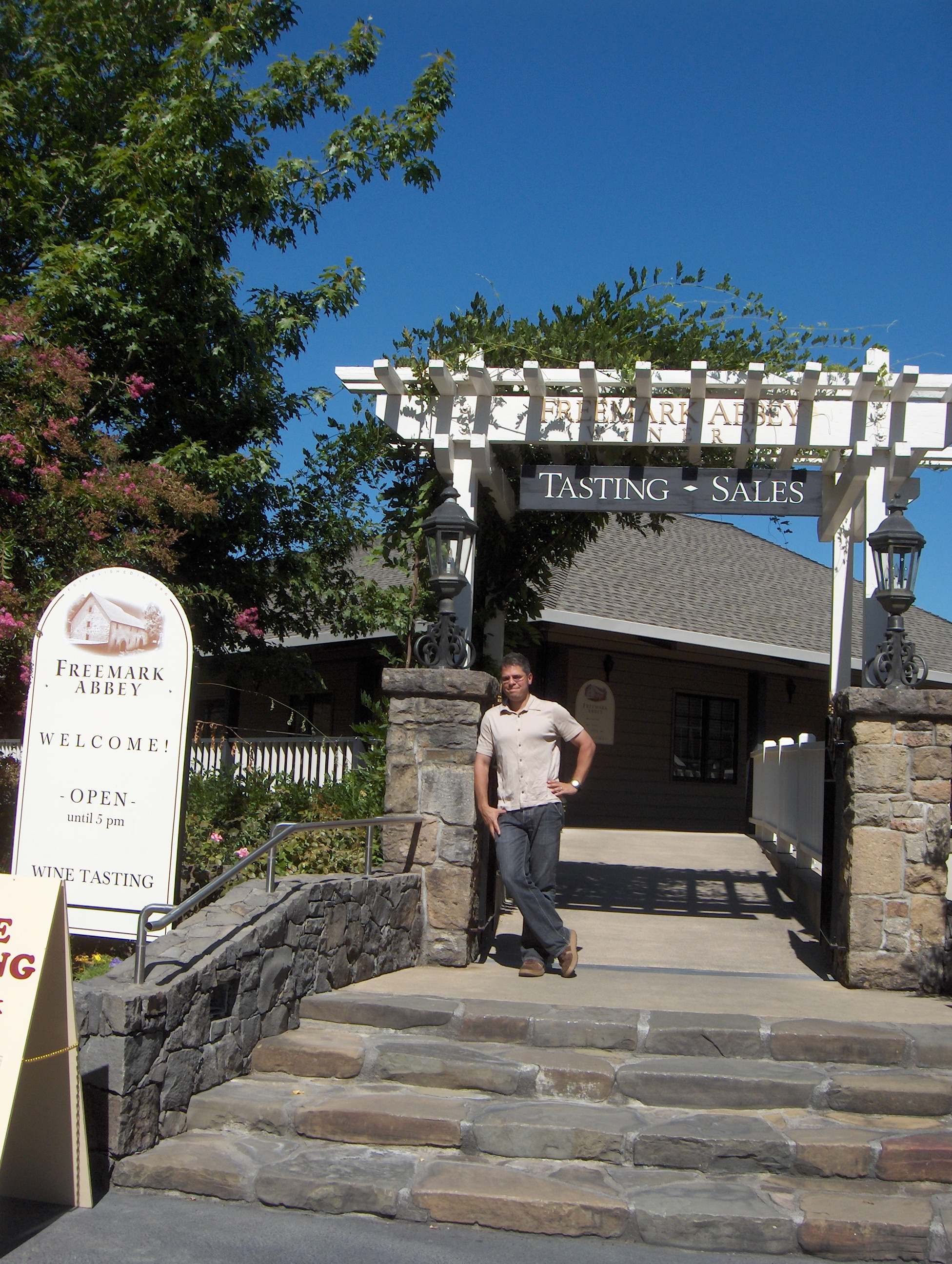
Freemark Abbey Winery

Freemark Abbey Winery, located between St. Helena and Calistoga in California's Napa Valley, traces its roots to 1886. Today, Freemark Abbey produces Cabernet Sauvignon, Merlot, Chardonnay, and Sauvignon Blanc, as well as very limited production wines, such as Viognier, Malbec, and Cabernet Franc. Depending on conditions, the winery sometimes makes a late harvest Riesling known as "Edelwein Gold".

== History ==
The winery was first built by Josephine Marlin Tychson, one of the first women to build and operate a winery in the state. The winery was originally named Tychson Cellars and it produced Zinfandel, Riesling, and "Burgundy". Josephine Tychson sold the winery to her foreman Nils Larsen in 1894. Larson in turn leased the property to Antonio Forni and later sold it to him in 1898. Forni renamed the winery Lombarda Cellars after his birthplace; Lombarda Italy. He concentrated his efforts on making Chianti and other Italian style wines which he marketed to the numerous Italians that had moved to Barre, Vermont, the site of America's largest marble and granite quarries. Forni was forced to cease operations when Prohibition began.

In 1939, three businessmen from Southern California, Albert "Abbey" Ahern, Charles Freeman and Markquand Foster purchased Lombarda Cellars. Together they reopened the winery and renamed it Freemark Abbey (a combination which includes a portion of each partner's name). During the 1940s and 1950s the partners sold the majority of their wines to retail outlets in San Francisco. The winery went through several hands in the early 1960s before being purchased by a group of seven partners in 1966. After the purchase, the new owners made major improvements to the facility. This core group owned the winery until 2001 when they sold it to The Legacy Estate Group. In March 2005 the Legacy Estate Group overreached and tried to consolidate Arrowood and Byron into one group. Eight months later, in November 2005, the Legacy Estate group went bankrupt and sold its assets in an auction. Freemark Abbey is now a part of Jackson Family Wines, which is owned by the family of the late Jess Jackson.

== See also ==
- California wine
