= Brown Winery =

Brown Winery or Brown's Winery can refer to:

- Brown Brothers Milawa Vineyard, an Australian wine company
- Brown Estate, a United States winery
