= The Culinary Institute of America at Greystone =

Culinary college in St. Helena, California

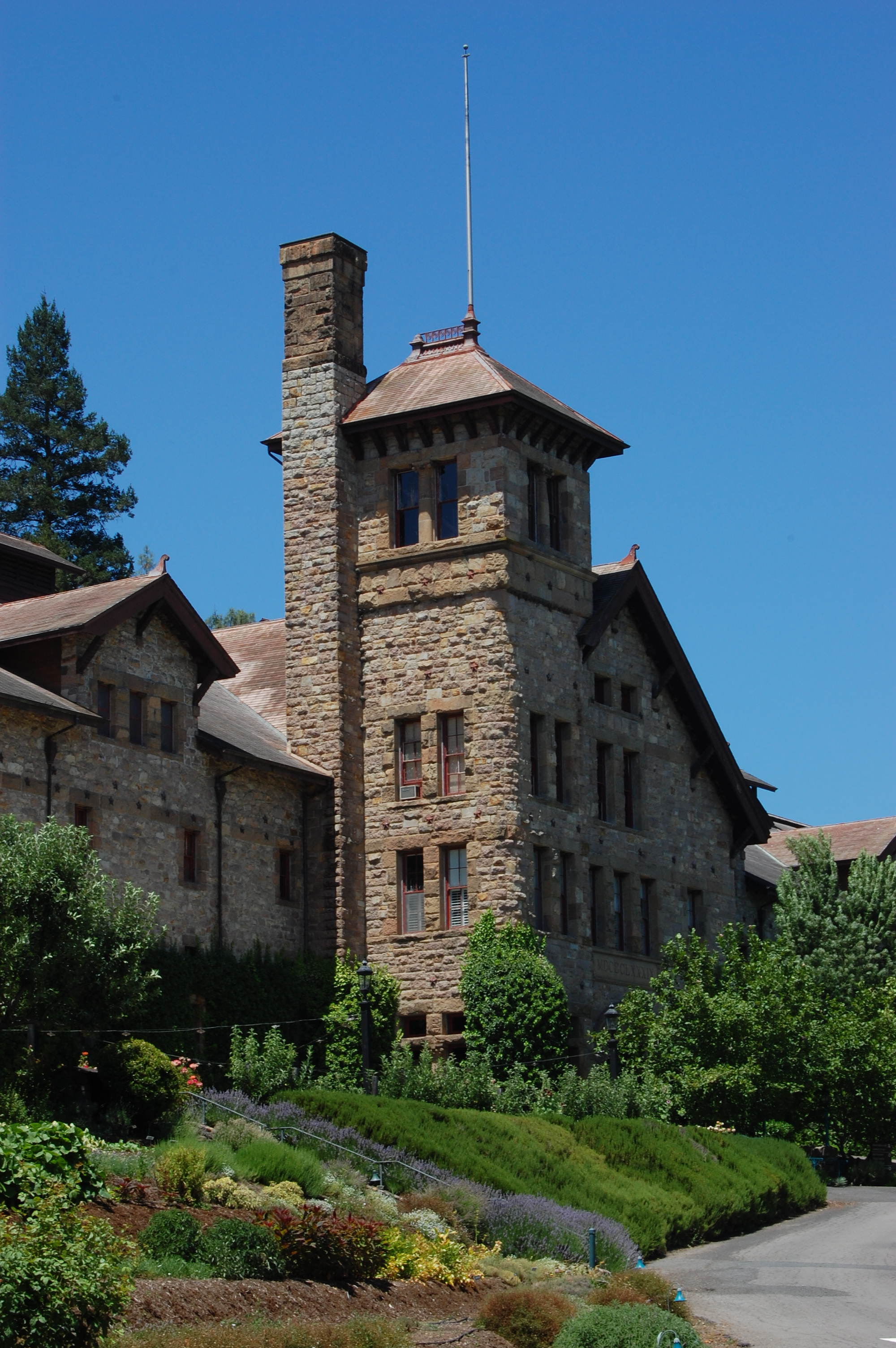
- Other name: The CIA at Greystone
- Type: Private
- Established: 1995; 31 years ago
- President: Michiel Bakker
- Undergraduates: 300
- Location: 2555 Main Street, St. Helena, California 94574
- Campus: Suburban
- Website: Official website
- Greystone Cellars
- U.S. National Register of Historic Places
- Coordinates: 38°30′52″N 122°29′2″W
- Area: 13 acres (5.3 ha)
- Built: 1888
- Architect: Percy & Hamilton
- Architectural style: Richardson Romanesque
- NRHP reference No.: 78000725
- Added to NRHP: August 10, 1978

The Culinary Institute of America at Greystone is a branch campus of the private culinary college the Culinary Institute of America. The Greystone campus, located on State Route 29/128 in St. Helena, California, offers associate degrees and two certificate programs in culinary arts and baking and pastry arts. The CIA at Greystone and the Culinary Institute of America at Copia make up the school's California branch.

The campus' primary facility is a 117,000-square-foot (10,900 m^{2}) stone building, known as Greystone Cellars and built for William Bowers Bourn II as a cooperative wine cellar in 1889. Hamden McIntyre designed the gravity flow winery along with other wineries of the decade. The building changed ownership several times, and was notably owned by the Christian Brothers as a winery from 1945 to 1989. It was used as a winery until its sale to the school in 1993, and was added to the National Register of Historic Places in 1978.

== History ==
=== Establishment of Greystone Cellars ===
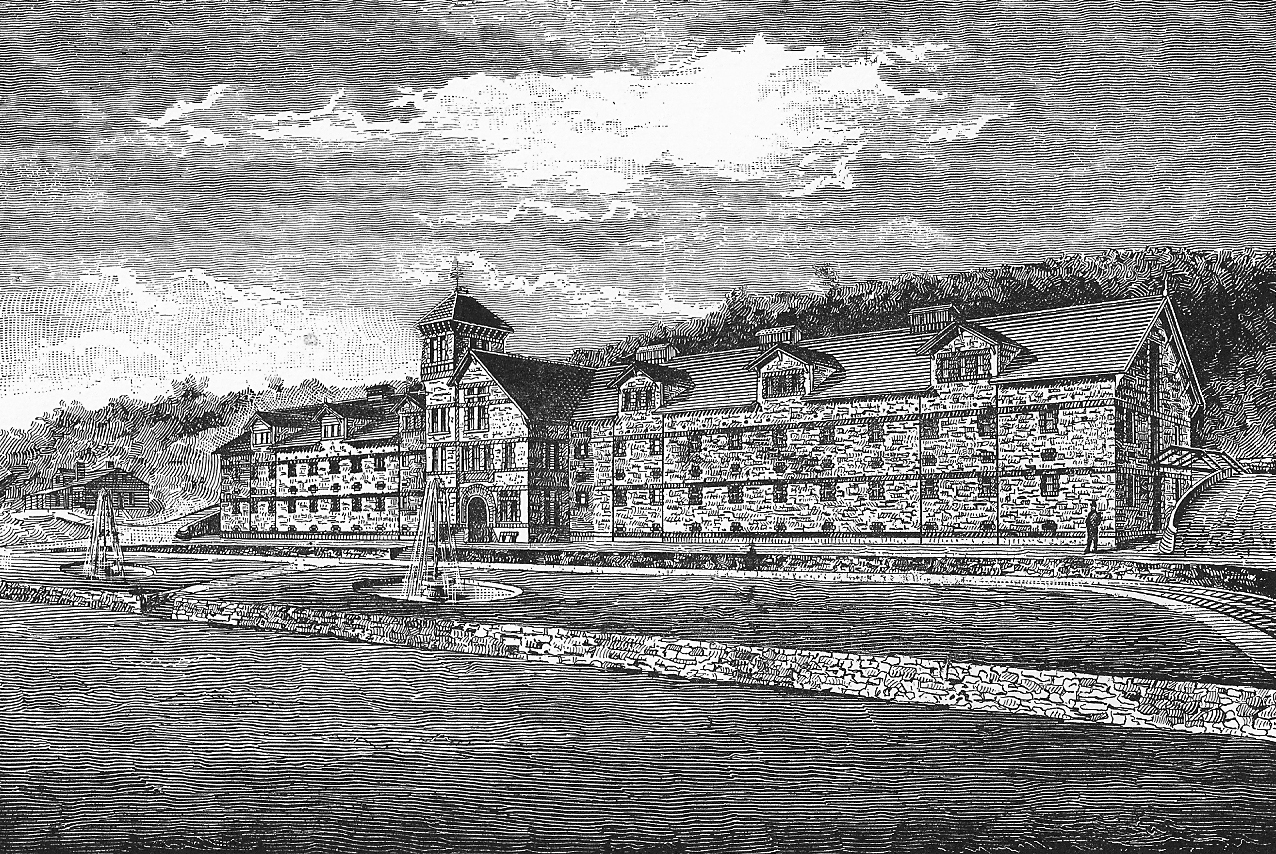
Greystone Cellars in 1889

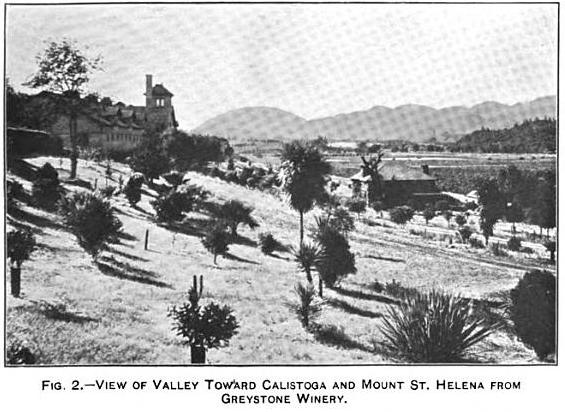
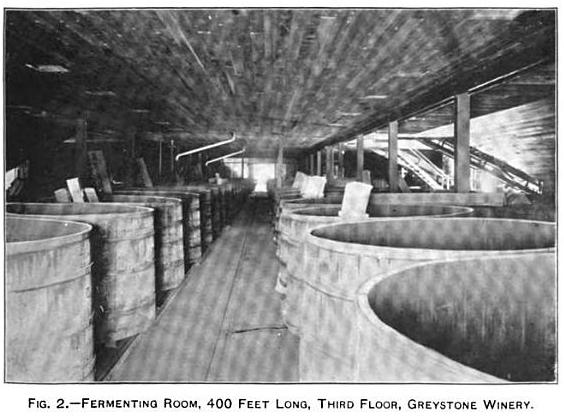
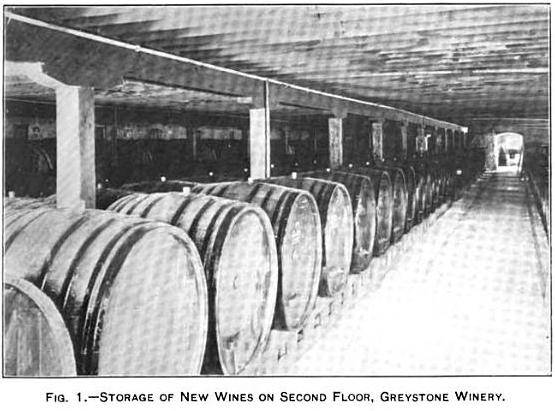
Greystone Cellars c. 1903

The Greystone campus is situated in and around the Greystone Cellars building, which William Bowers Bourn II conceived as a business concept. His father, William Bowers Bourn Sr., was wealthy from ownership of the Empire Mine gold mine, as well as co-ownership of a shipping company. Bourn II was a businessman with business interests and residences around California, although he had spent his summers during his youth at White Sulphur Springs Resort in St. Helena, before his parents bought Madroño, an estate in the town.

Around the 1880s, San Francisco wine dealers were purchasing wine from Napa Valley vintners at low prices (sometimes around 15 to 18 cents per gallon). The dealers had facilities to store and age wines that most Napa Valley vintners lacked, and thus were able to purchase wine from the vintners at low prices. Because of this, Bourn began a campaign to build the cooperative winery; he was in his early 30s at the time. He created a business partnership with another businessman, E. Everett Wise, who was of a similar age. Bourn then asked for support within the Napa County wine industry. Bourn met with Henry Pellet, president of the St. Helena Vinicultural Club, who endorsed the idea and encouraged his associates to do the same. Bourn and Wise ended up gathering enough support from the local wine industry, and they hired George Percy and Frederick F. Hamilton of the San Francisco architectural firm Percy & Hamilton to design the Greystone Cellars, along with Italian stonemasons to build the façades, and the Ernest L. Ransome firm to handle concrete work. The plans involved the use of new materials and technology of the time, including the relatively new Portland cement. The cement was used as mortar and also poured over the iron reinforcing rods built within the first and second floor elevations. The heavy timber construction of the third floor provided structural support for not only that floor's cask, barrel and bottle aging space but also for the gravity-flow crushing area located on the floor above. The architects planned for the cellars to hold two million gallons of wine at a time, with thirteen tunnels in the hillside behind the building to hold another million gallons. Those tunnels collapsed due to effects of water seepage and of the 1906 San Francisco earthquake.

A large number of men were hired for the building's construction, and local workers were chosen over non-locals. During the construction, many of the workers lived in tents beside their worksite, and cooked meals and stayed there when not working. The cornerstone was laid on June 15, 1888; (Note: The National Register of Historic Places nomination form lists that the cornerstone was laid on June 18, 1886.) beneath it was laid several bottles of wine, a copy of a St. Helena Star and San Francisco newspapers, and foreign and rare coins. The building, called the Bourn & Wise Wine Cellar, was completed around June 1889, along with a distillery north of the building and a superintendent's house to the south. In September of that year Everett Wise became too ill to work and sold his share in the winery to Bourn, who between that time and 1890 named the winery Greystone Cellars.

The building cost $250,000 ($8.96 million in 2025). At its completion, architect George Percy described Greystone Cellars as the largest wine cellar in California, if not the world. Greystone was also the first California winery to be operated and illuminated by electricity, produced by a boiler and gas generator located in a mechanical room below the building's central front wing. In the spring of 1894, a long-lasting phylloxera scourge made Bourn decide the winery was no longer profitable.

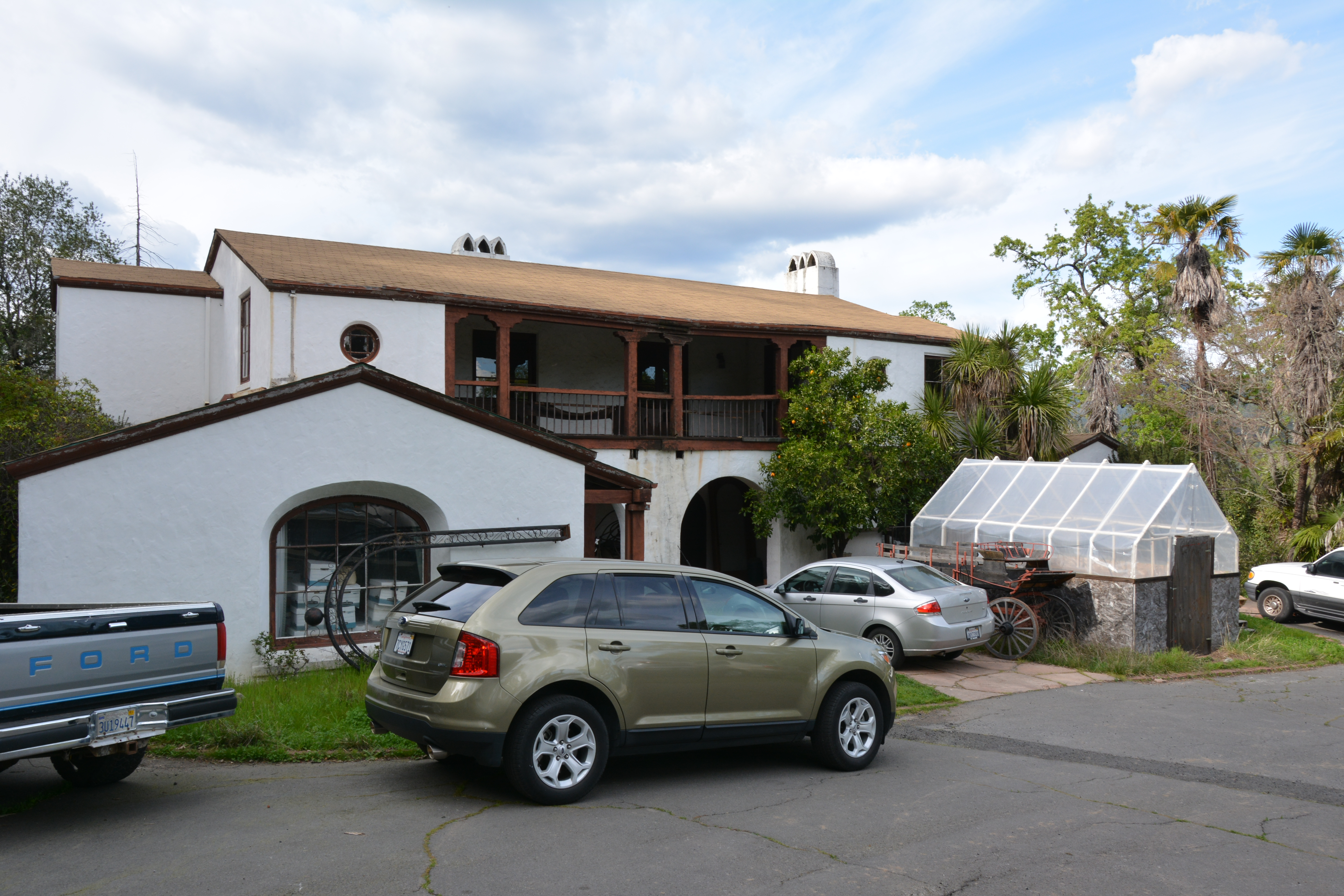
The former Carpy residence

=== Subsequent uses ===
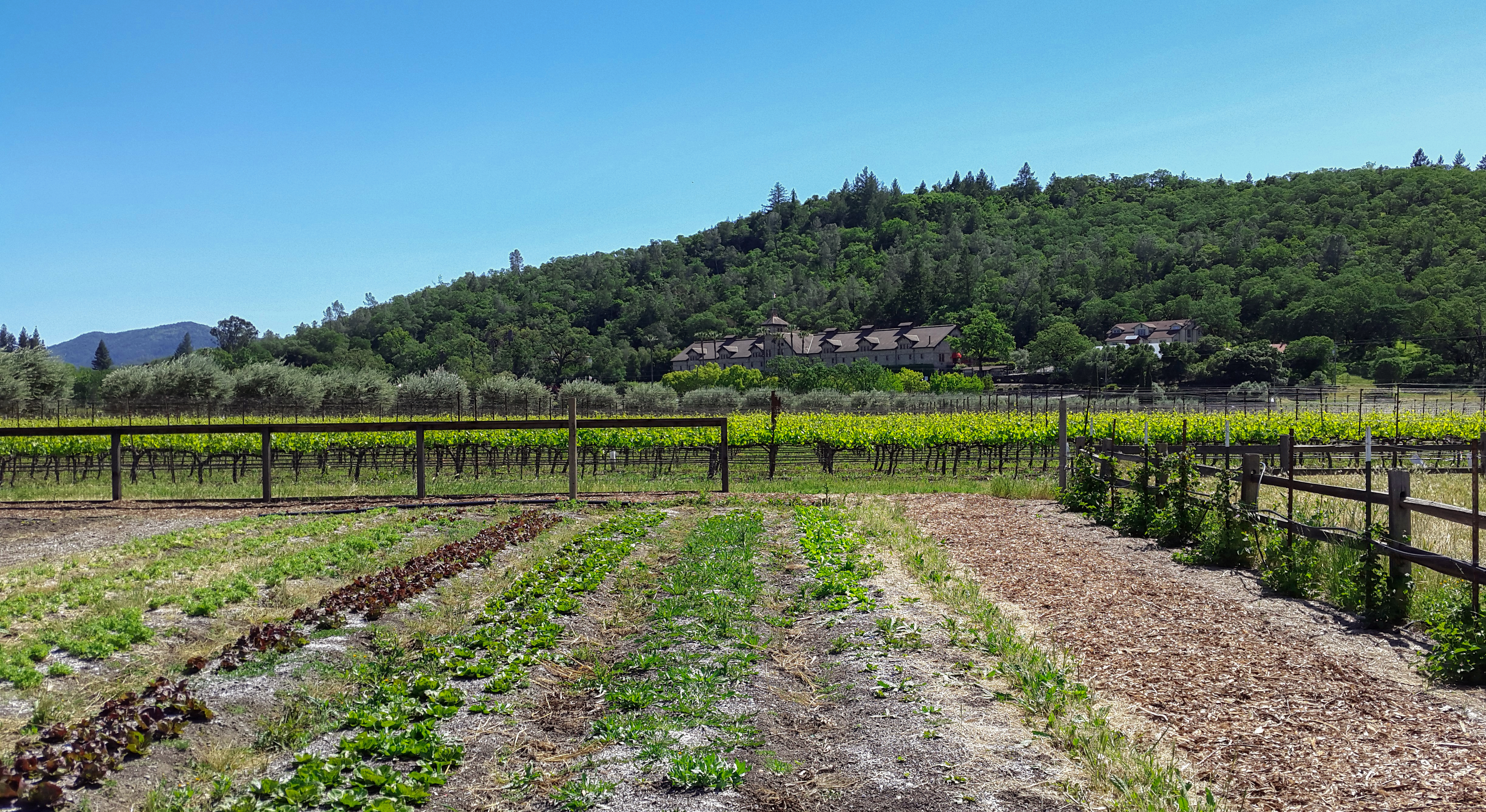
Greystone from its farms at the Charles Krug Winery

He sold the building at a low price that year, to Charles Carpy, who deeded the property to the California Wine Association. The association continued using the Greystone Cellars wine label. A year later, the Bisceglia brothers of San Jose purchased Greystone where they produced sacramental wine under the same label until 1930, and again beginning in October 1933. The Carpy family maintained part of the land, including a Victorian house nicknamed Albert's Villa south of the winery. The house burned down around 1929 and was replaced with a Spanish-style house that is now owned by the school.

In 1940, the Brothers of the Christian Schools (the Christian Brothers) leased the property, purchasing it in 1945, and using it for sparkling wine production from 1950 to 1989. It was listed on the National Register of Historic Places in 1978. The Christian Brothers sold the property in 1989 because of declining market shares and vineyard yields, and the costs of seismically retrofitting Greystone. The Heublein Company of Canada purchased the property and marketing rights to the Christian Brothers' brands in 1990, shortly after the 1989 Loma Prieta earthquake occurred. The earthquake damaged the Greystone Cellars building, rendering the northern portion of the building unusable.

=== Culinary Institute campus ===
In 1993, Heublein sold the property at about 10 percent of its $14 million ($31.2 million in 2025) valuation, $1.68 million ($3.74 million in 2025), to the Culinary Institute of America, which used $15 million ($33.4 million in 2025) to renovate the building and give it a seismic retrofit. After completing the work in August 1995, the school established the property as a branch campus. After initially offering certificate courses, in autumn 2006, the campus began offering associate degrees. In 2015, the college put in motion plans to purchase a portion of Copia, a museum in downtown Napa that operated from 2001 to 2008. The college intends to open a campus, the Culinary Institute of America at Copia, which will house the CIA's new Food Business School. The school, which was outgrowing the Greystone campus, purchased the northern portion of the property for $12.5 million (it was recently assessed for $21.3 million).

== Architecture ==
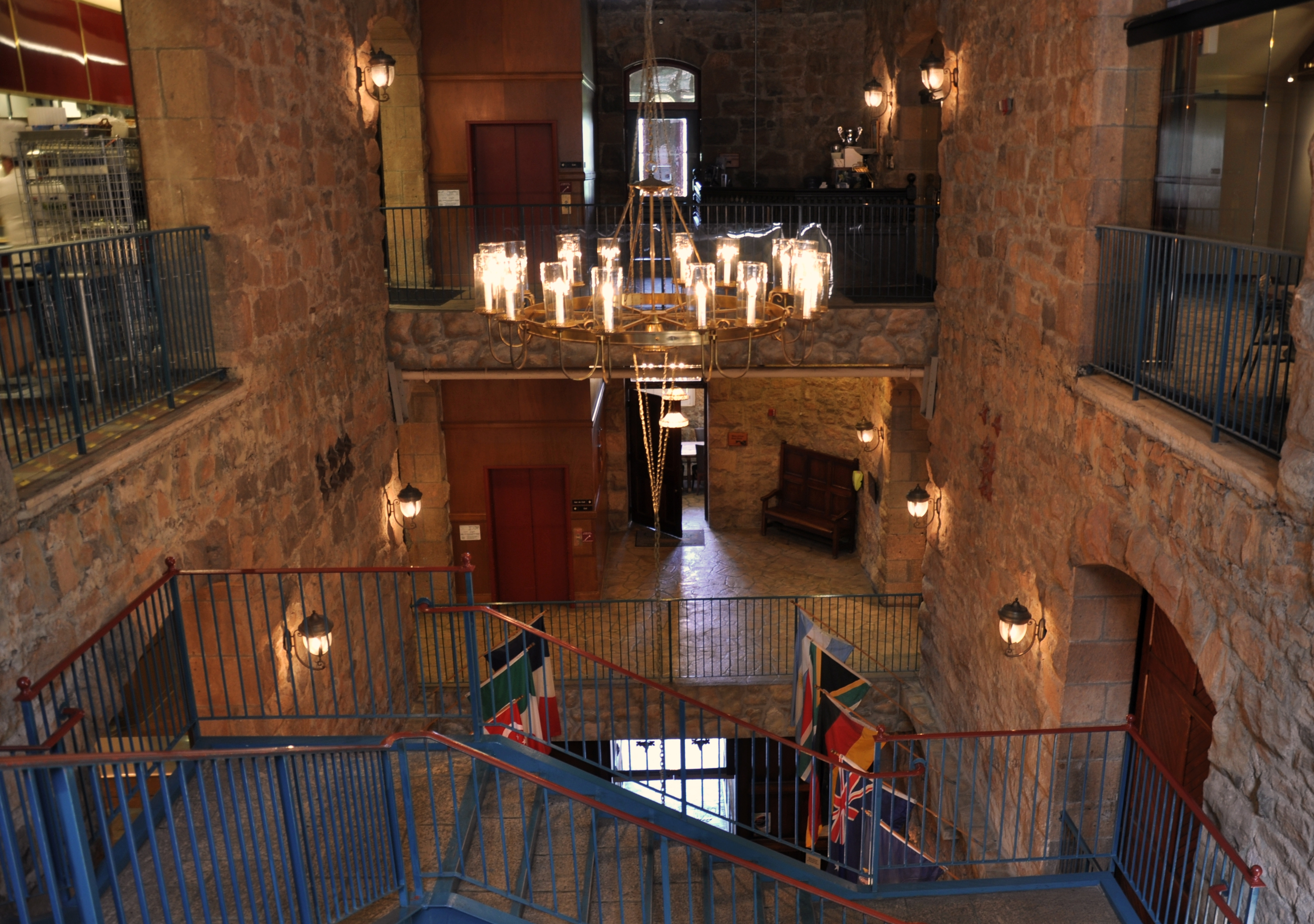
Central stairwell and hallways in Greystone

The Greystone Cellars building stands on a terraced hillside site on the west side of 29/128, about a mile north of St. Helena's central business district. It has 117,000 square feet (10,900 m^{2}), three stories, and a basement, and is around 400 feet (120 m) long, 76 feet (23 m) wide, and 66 feet (20 m) tall, with 22-inch (56 cm) thick walls. As a wine cellar, it held 3.5 million gallons. The building was designed in the Richardson Romanesque style, with an arched entranceway and tower, stone mullions and transoms, a low sweeping roof, well-fitted stonework, and a large and simple stone façade. The building's exterior is made of local light gray volcanic stone put together with Portland cement; the trimmings are of a red stone. Bourne had insisted that gray stones were used in the east façade of the building (its main façade), with darker or other colored stones usable for the other sides of the building. The roof originally used black slate roof tiles.

The building has a front projection measuring 50 by 20 feet (15 m × 6.1 m), which held the main entranceway and an office and sample room. The former office has walls and ceilings of quartered oak, and includes a stone fireplace and vault door. The former sample room has paneled mahogany walls and ceilings, a parquet floor, open bottle racks on walls, and two lockers of mahogany. The windows are polished plate glass with stained glass transoms. The tasting and sales rooms are still preserved in their original form. The projection also includes a 20-by-20-foot (6.1 m × 6.1 m) stone tower that extends one story above the roof and was built to hold a large water tank. A driveway wraps around the front and back of the building, where it is nearly level with the third floor.

The interior has two distinct wings with a large hallway between them, originally with an iron staircase and a hydraulic ram elevator both leading to the third floor. Each side of the hallway on each floor had three doors 8 feet (2.4 m) wide. 4-inch (100 mm) iron pipes were placed through the walls and floors every thirty feet in order to pipe wine from one part of the building to another, and into and out of the building.

Property changes since the original construction include the front terrace, entranceway and landscaping. The former front lawn and flower beds were paved over, and a new driveway was cut into the stone wall north of the original large stone arch over the first driveway.

== Programs ==
The campus' programs include associate degrees in culinary arts and in baking and pastry arts, a master's degree program in wine management, and a 30-week culinary arts certificate program. Of the campus' 300 students, approximately 60 percent are in the culinary arts degree program, 23 percent in the baking and pastry arts degree program, and 17 percent in a certificate program, as of 2013.

== School facilities ==
The primary school building is the Greystone Cellars building, which houses teaching kitchens, the Wine Spectator Greystone Restaurant, the Bakery Café by illy, the Spice Islands Marketplace (the campus store), the De Baun and Ecolab Theatres (auditoriums and cooking demonstration facilities, also used as lecture halls), and administrative offices. Adjacent to the teaching kitchens is the Margie Schubert Library.

=== Teaching kitchens ===
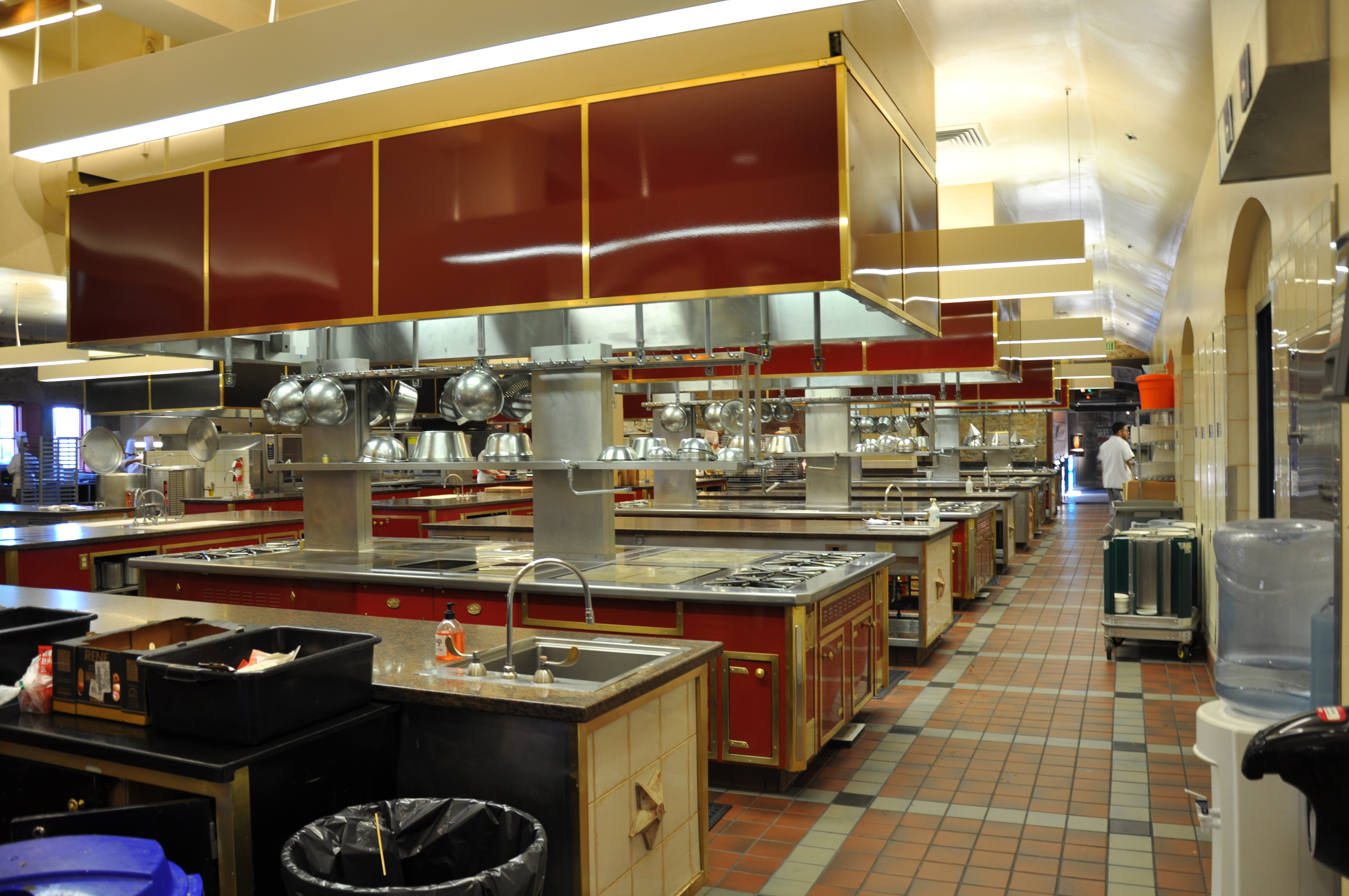
The third-floor culinary arts teaching kitchen

The 15,000-square-foot (1,400 m^{2}) teaching kitchens at Greystone are on the third floor of the primary building. The space was designed without interior walls in order to facilitate ease of movement and open exchange of ideas. The kitchens vary from common stainless steel commercial kitchens by using materials including granite, stone, tile, and wood. The kitchens use Bonnet stoves and have a variety of cooking appliances, including rotisseries, appliances for induction cooking, a stone hearth oven, convection ovens, combi steamers, French tops, and numerous large mixers. The baking and pastry kitchen has 16-foot (4.9 m) flecked granite and solid oak tables for pastry and dough preparation.

On the first floor, the 5,000-square-foot (460 m^{2}) Viking Teaching Kitchen is designed for 36 to 40 students at a time. Its appliances and equipment were donated by Viking Range Corporation's founders and installed as part of a comprehensive redesign of the building's first floor in 2010. The redesign also involved the completion of a chocolate-making facility and the campus store and Flavor Bar.

=== Restaurants ===
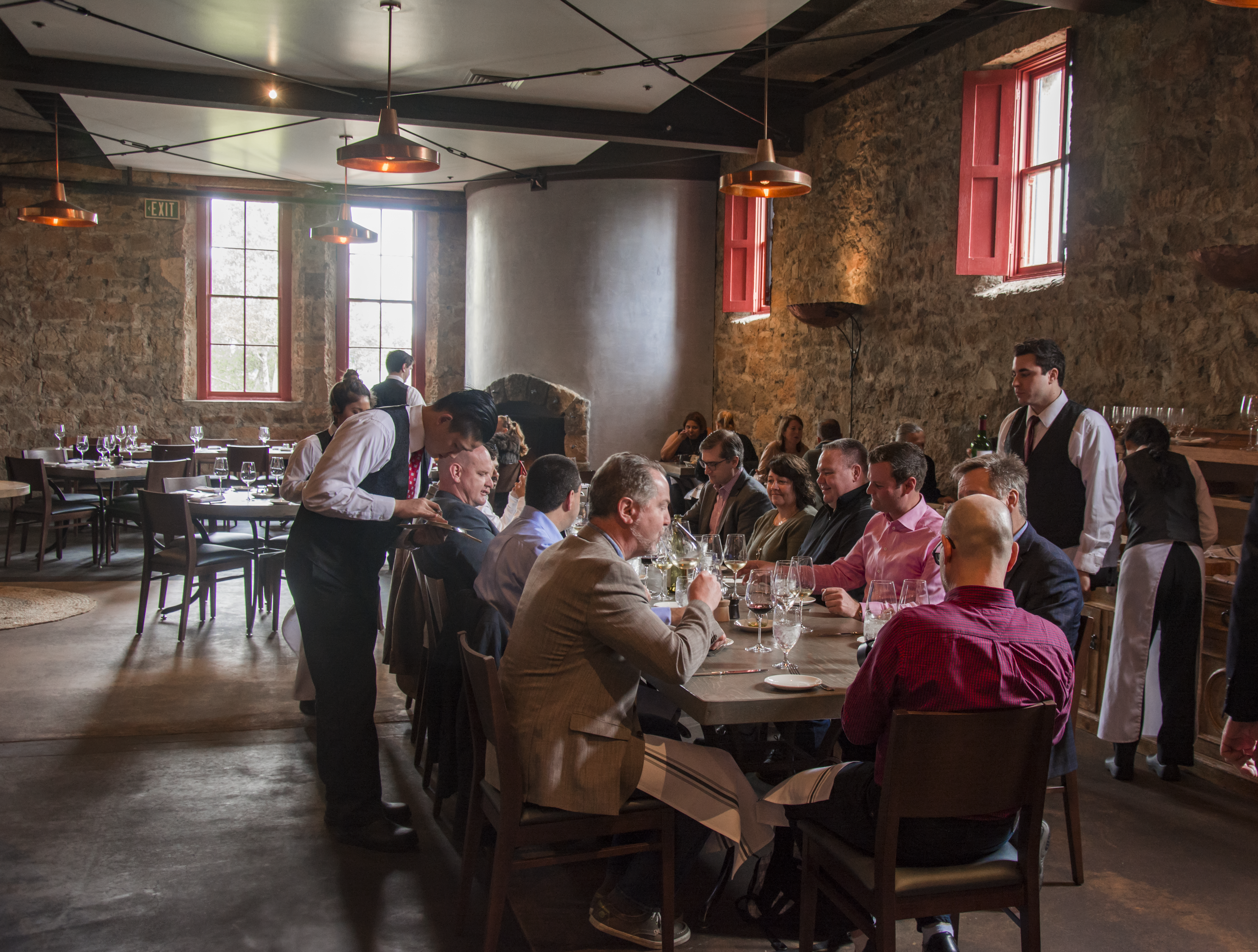
The Wine Spectator Greystone Restaurant

The Gatehouse Restaurant, staffed by the school's degree program students, is a casual restaurant serving contemporary food with local ingredients. The Bakery Café by illy is run by Baking and Pastry Arts Certificate students. The café has sandwiches, salads, soups, and fresh pastries and breads, and also serves coffee, espressos, and teas.

Two former restaurants operated at the campus: the Conservatory Restaurant was led by students of the Farm-to-Table concentration in the CIA's bachelor's degree programs. The Wine Spectator Greystone Restaurant (WSGR) was run by students in the associate degree program in culinary arts. The restaurant focused on using local and seasonal ingredients, and the dining room had open cooking stations to give diners a full view of the working kitchen. The WSGR initially served food of the Mediterranean cuisines, and was at first professionally run. Later on, it became fully student-run, however changes in late 2015 led to lunch service staffed by students and dinner service staffed by employees. The restaurants closed around 2016 with the campus' reorganization after purchasing Copia.

=== Residence halls ===
Residence halls
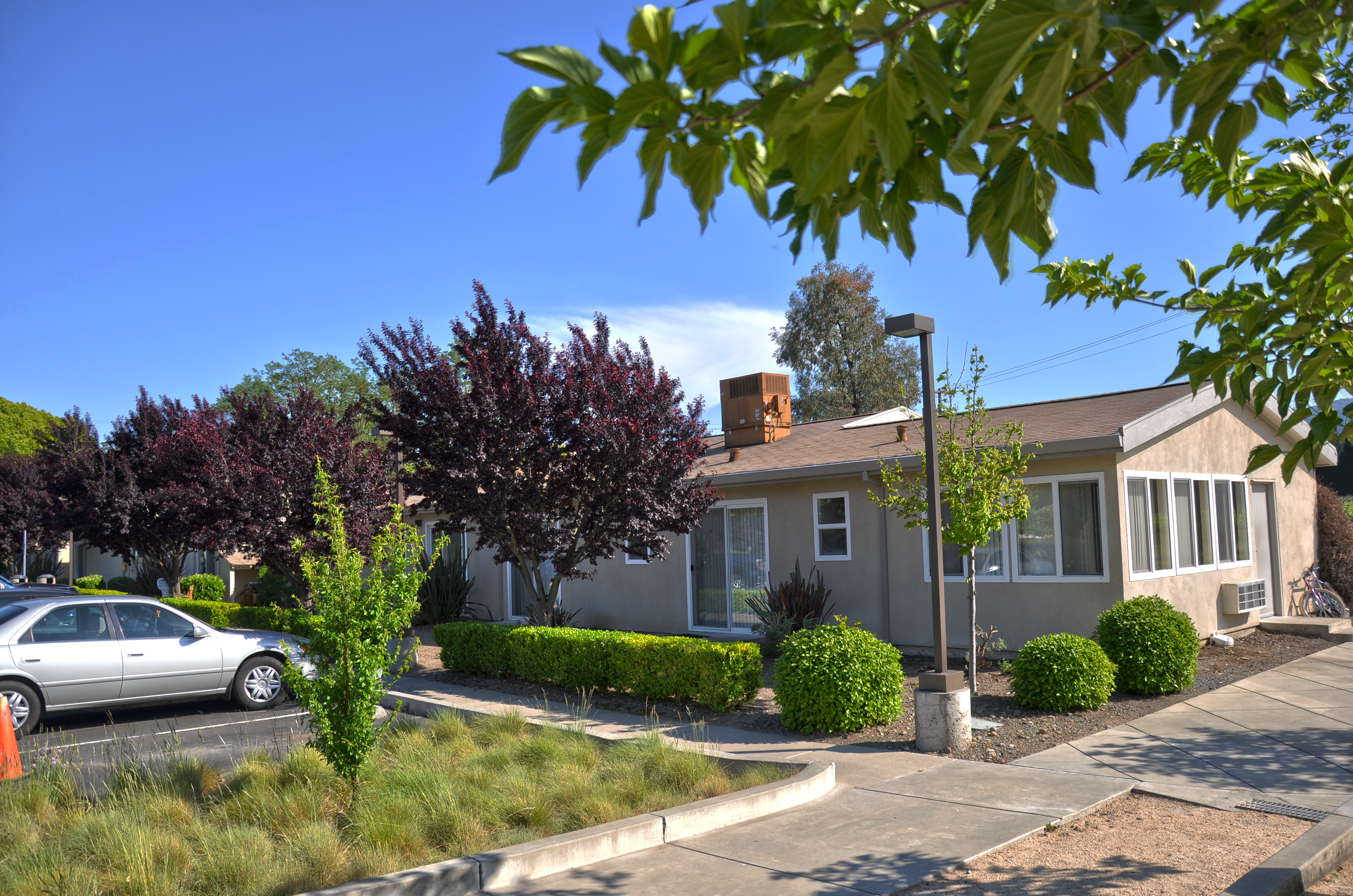
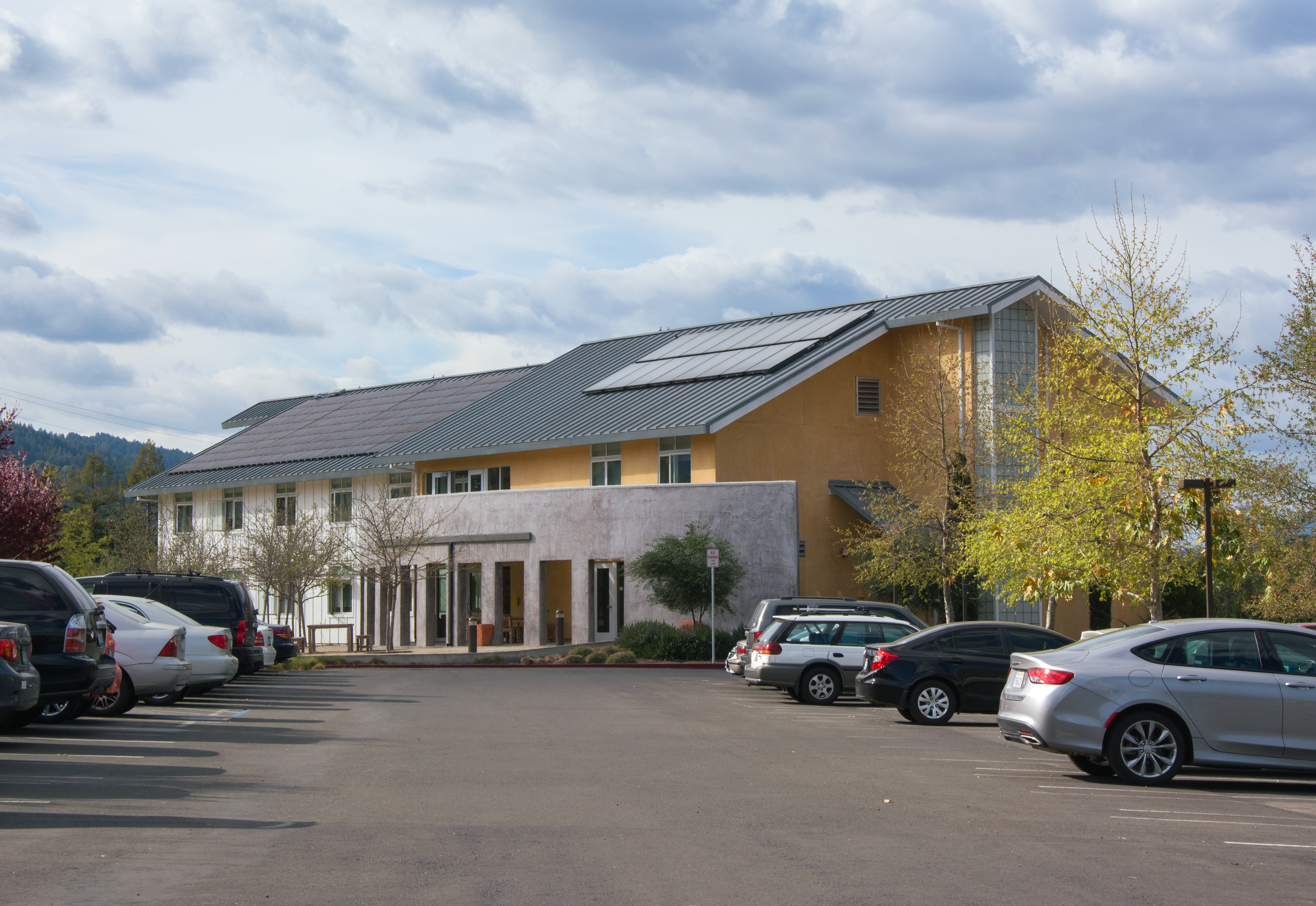
Vineyard Lodge I (top)
Vineyard Lodge II (middle)
Guest House (bottom)

The campus offers housing for 130 students, and has three residence halls: the 18-room Guest House, the 41-room Vineyard Lodge I, and the 30-room Vineyard Lodge II. The residence halls have single, double, and triple-occupancy rooms. The Guest House is located on-campus and the Vineyard Lodges are about three-quarters of a mile (1.2 km) from the campus, with shuttle service to and from the buildings.

The campus' newest residence hall, Vineyard Lodge II, was built around 2009 as the campus expected to double its enrollment. The building has two-stories, 31 dorm rooms, a kitchen, an activity room, an outside deck and two manager's rooms. The school planned for an environmentally-oriented dormitory, with solar panels to cover some of the building's electrical needs, as well as a membrane system for waste water. The building also has board and batten siding, which lasts longer than wooden siding. The building, on Pratt Avenue in St. Helena, is the first building in the city to be metal-framed rather than wood-framed, to better prevent termites, mold, and fire. The school estimated costs of $4 million for a Napa-based construction company to construct the building. The company demolished a 1,750-square-foot (163 m^{2}) laundry and facilities building in what was described as a green-oriented process. At the time of construction, the school annually enrolled 104 students; the new residence hall would allow the campus to enroll another 100 students.

=== Other facilities ===
The Williams Center for Flavor Discovery

- The De Baun Theatre is a 48-seat demonstration kitchen that hosts cooking demonstrations for the public.
- The Ecolab Theatre is a 125-seat amphitheater-style demonstration auditorium that rises through the first two levels of the building. It is designed for cooking demonstrations, lectures, food and wine tastings, and other special events. The auditorium's demonstration kitchen has a 22-foot (6.7 m) cooking center, large video monitors, and fixed tables at every seat.
- The Rudd Center for Professional Wine Studies, a two-story distillery building dating to around 1889, is used for the Professional Wine Studies program and was named after the Rudd family of Rudd Farms. The building has sensory analysis classrooms with wireless keypad response systems, built-in light boxes, and expectoration stations. The Rudd Center contains a pantry, a 4,000-bottle wine cave and private dining room, and a terrace. Karen MacNeil is the creator and chairman of the center. The building opened in 2003 for a wine professional credential; the school began its wine and beverage certification program in 2010. In 2013 the school began a wine, beverage, and hospitality concentration in its bachelor's degree program.
- The Spice Islands Marketplace is the campus store, and offers culinary-related items (cooking equipment, cookbooks, uniforms, and food ingredients). Next to the store is a flavor bar that holds tasting exercises for guests.
- The Ventura Center for Menu Research and Development has 8,000 square feet (740 m^{2}) of classrooms, a theater-style kitchen, and interactive audience response audio technologies.
- The Williams Center for Flavor Discovery, in the former gatehouse, is used by students for the study of flavors and flavor development in food and wine. The results of tasting panels at the building are shared with members of the culinary industry to enhance understanding of flavor in food, cooking, and wine.

== See also ==
- List of colleges and universities in California
