= Josephine Tychson =

American winemaker

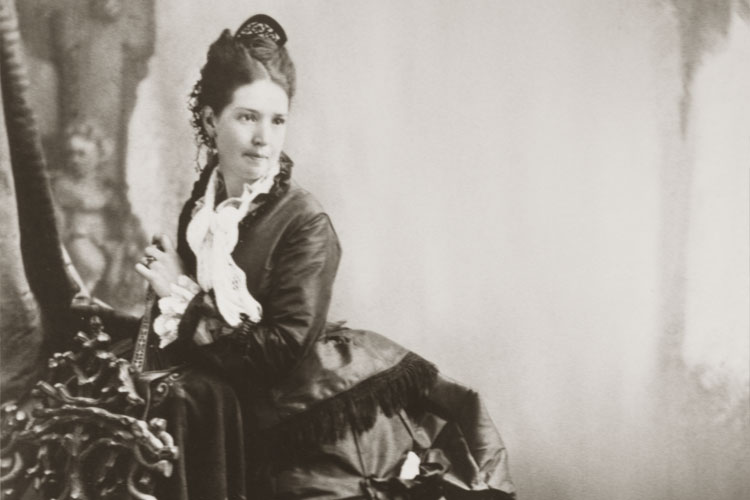
Josephine Tychson

Josephine Marlin Tychson (March 5, 1855 - December 18, 1939) was the second woman to build and operate a winery in the Napa Valley. In 1886, she established a winery in St. Helena, selling it in 1894. Its name changed to Lombarda Cellars and is now Freemark Abbey Winery.

== Early life ==
Tychson was born in 1855, into a wealthy family from Pennsylvania. John Marlin (d. 1878) and Eliza (née Bower; 1823-1860), her parents, had also lived in Astoria, Oregon; Tychson was one of 8 children. She grew up in Philadelphia before the family moved to San Lorenzo. At the age of 8, her mother died and her father remarried Eliza's sister. Tychson's father and aunt were influential from a young age in her development as an independent, young women.

== Career ==
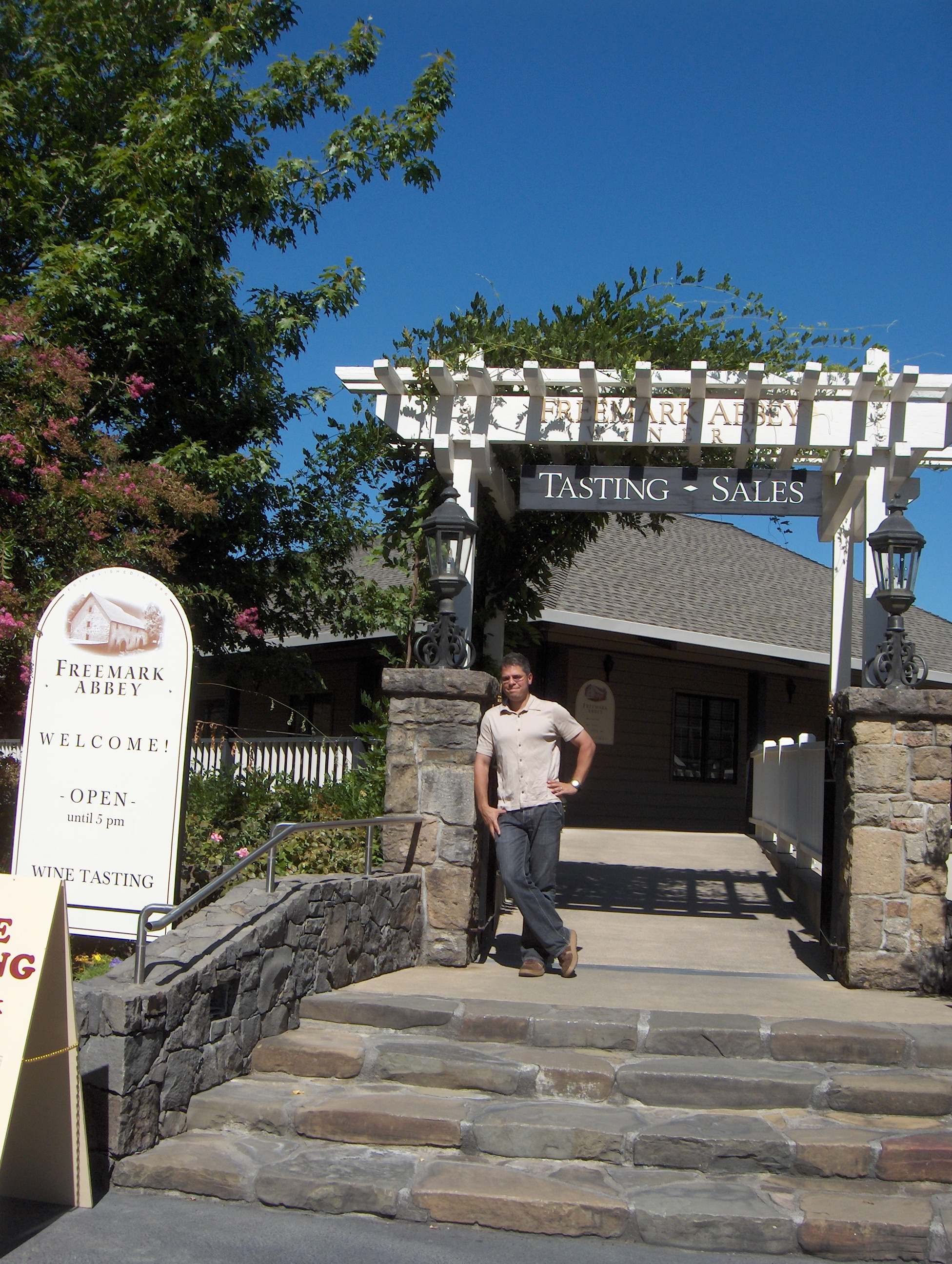
Freemark Abbey Winery today

Following the death of her sister Catherine in 1874, she married the Danish farmer, John C. Tychson. Their first child, Annette, was born in 1878. In 1879, the young family moved to Denmark, where John took care of some affairs, before returning to the United States. They moved to the Napa Valley in northern California, where they purchased a 147 acres of land just north of St. Helena from William James Sayward, a sea captain. They planted the vineyards in 1881, establishing Tychson Cellars five years later. She lost her tuberculosis-afflicted husband to suicide at the Newland House Hotel in Oakland, leaving her to look after two children and the estate.

According to an 1890 report by the California Board of State Viticultural Commissioners, the Tychson Winery cultivated Zinfandel, Riesling and Burgundy; it also noted that the estate had expanded to 65 acres of wine grapes, of which 55 acres were in bearing. In 1893, Tychson lost some 10% of her grapes to the parasite phylloxera. As a result, she sold the winery in the following year to foreman Nels Larson; Larson sold it to Anton Forni in 1898, who renamed it Lombarda Cellars after the region of Italy that he hailed from, a name it retained until it went out of business.

Tychson, who never remarried, bought a white house opposite the vineyard. She was described as "an intrepid Victorian widow who could often be spotted riding". She died in 1939. Upon her death, the estate was sold to Charles Freeman, Mark Foster, and Abbey Ahern, giving it its name "Freemark Abbey". Tychson was remembered in a Napa County Historical Society temporary exhibition at the site, “Harvesting History,” which documented the early viticulture of the Napa Valley.
