= St. Helena Catholic Church (St. Helena, California) =

- U.S. National Register of Historic Places
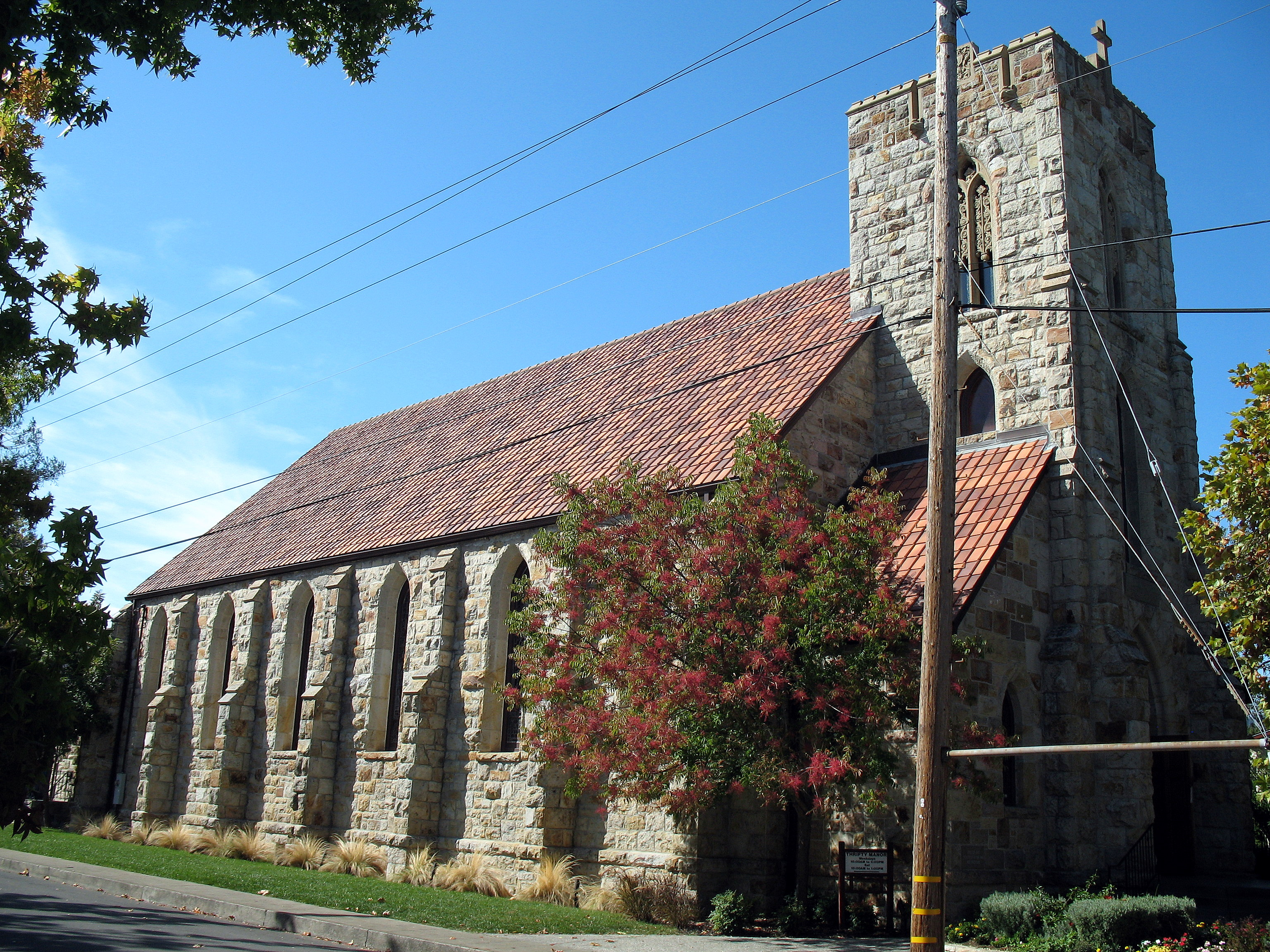

- Location within California Location within the United States
- Location: Oak and Tainter Sts., St. Helena, California
- Coordinates: 38°30′13″N 122°28′9″W
- Area: less than one acre
- Built: 1889–1890
- Architect: Father Renatus Becker
- Architectural style: English Gothic & Jacobean
- NRHP reference No.: 78000726
- Added to NRHP: May 23, 1978

St. Helena Catholic Church is a parish of the Roman Catholic Church in St. Helena, California. Founded in 1866 by Fr. Peter Deyaert, it remains an active congregation in the Diocese of Santa Rosa. The church, like the town and nearby Mount Saint Helena, is dedicated to St Helena of Constantinople.

It is noted for its historic parish church located at Oak and Tainter Streets, the third such building used by the parish. Built from 1889 to 1890, the church was constructed with stone, a common building material among early settlers of the Napa Valley. The church was designed in an English Medieval style with a Gothic tower. The church was restored in 1945 after a fire burned its interior; during the renovations, the tower was also redesigned and two sacristies were added. The church is now the only remaining entirely stone church in Napa County.

The church was added to the National Register of Historic Places on May 23, 1978.
