= V. Sattui Winery =

Winery in St. Helena, California, US

Coordinates: 38.489057°N 122.448101°W

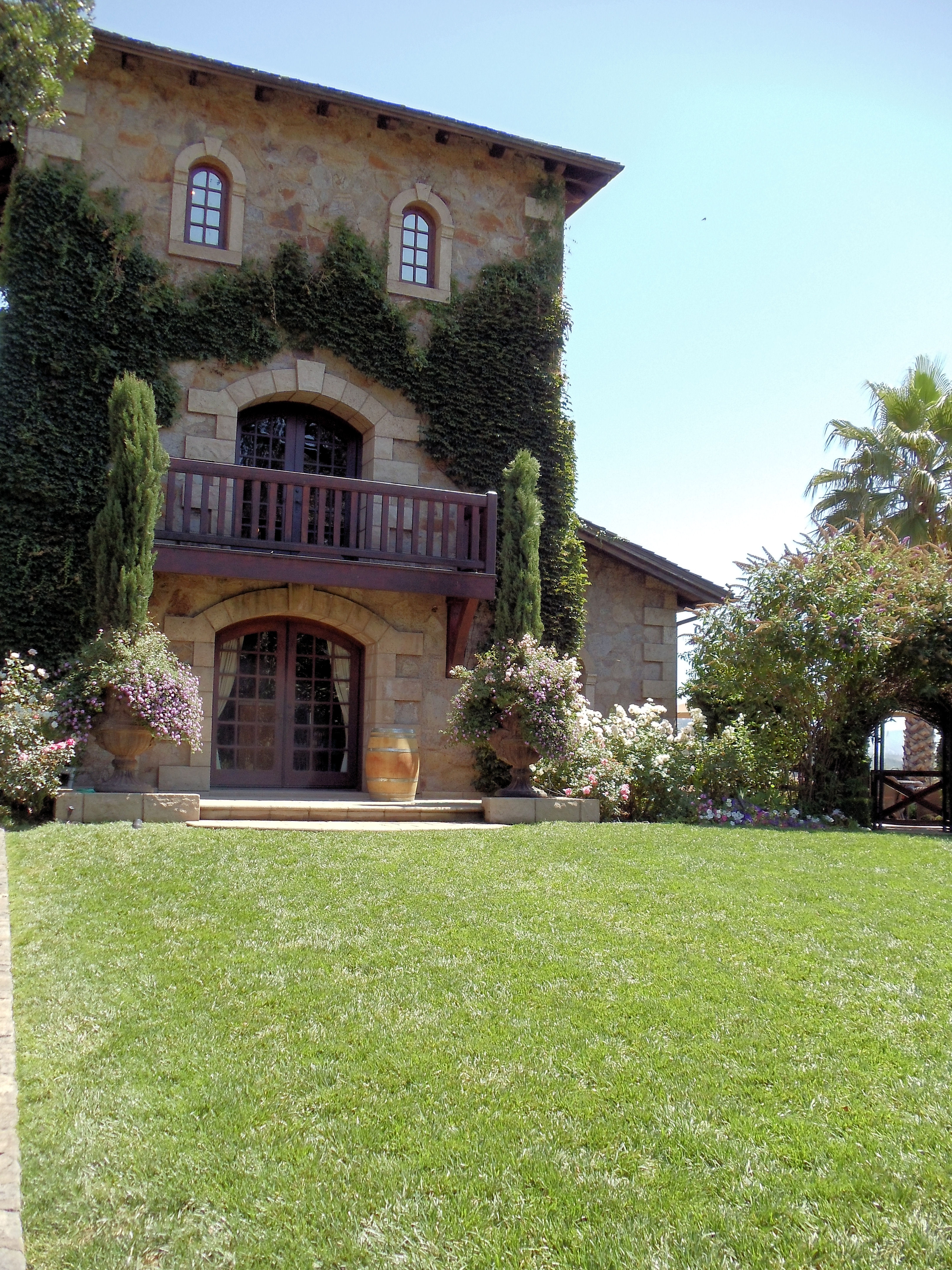
Exterior of V. Sattui Winery in St. Helena.

V. Sattui Winery is a winery and retail store located in St. Helena, in the Napa Valley region of California. The winery was originally established in San Francisco in 1885 by Vittorio Sattui who had emigrated from Genoa, Italy. The winery was shut down in 1920 during Prohibition and remained shuttered until 1976 when they opened their Napa Valley store in St. Helena. The winery was reopened by Dario Sattui, great grandson of Vittorio Sattui. The winery president is Tom Davies.

The winery is known for their large retail store and picnic area, which has events such as an annual Harvest Ball. Their wines have received numerous awards and reviews, and are sold exclusively at the winery or online. As of 2013, the winery sold more than 60,000 cases of wine each year.
