= Pope Street Bridge =

- U.S. National Register of Historic Places
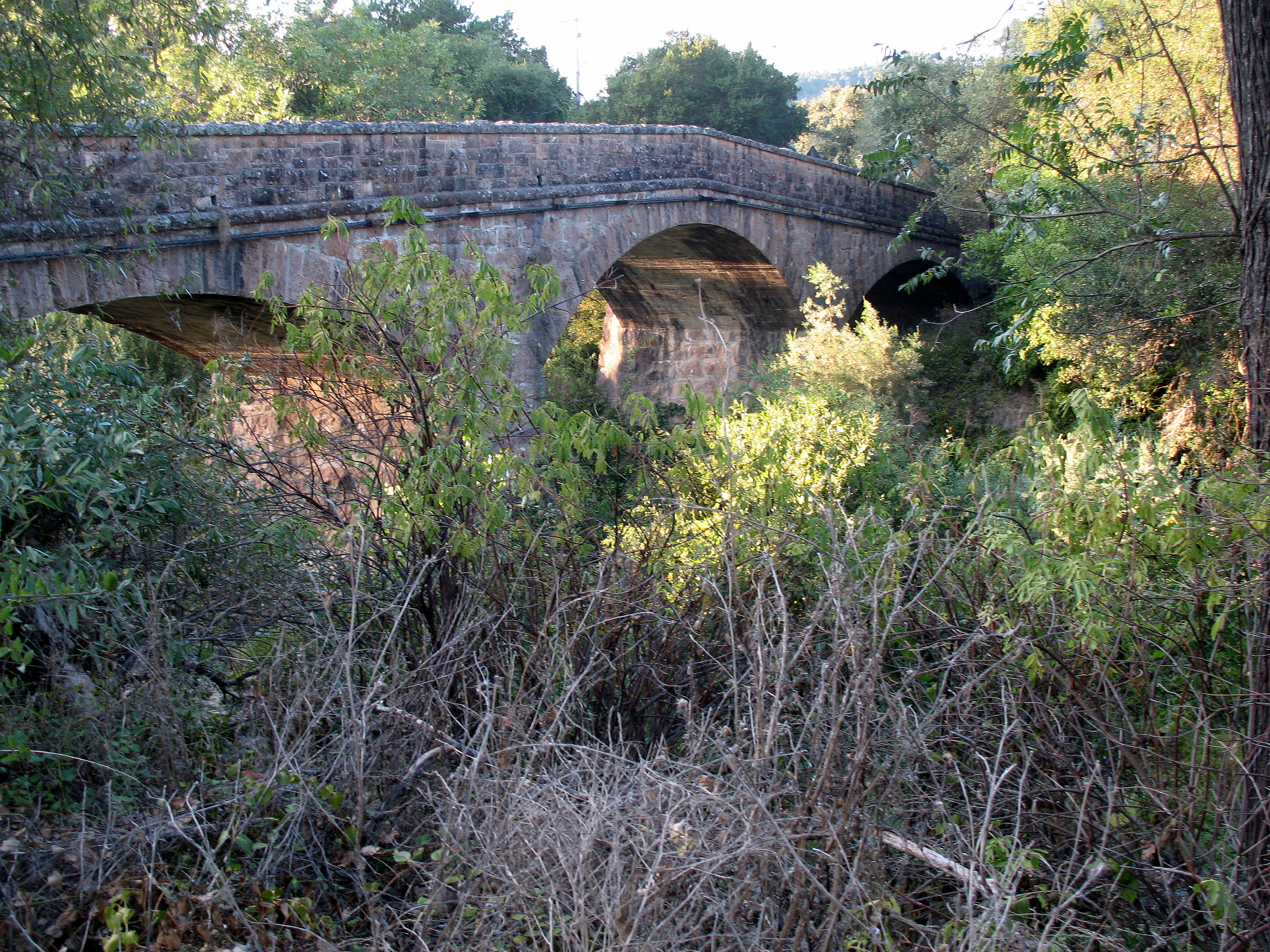

- Location within California Location within the United States
- Location: Pope St., over the Napa River, St. Helena, California
- Coordinates: 38°30′40.7″N 122°27′21.2″W
- Area: 0.3 acres (0.12 ha)
- Built: 1894
- Built by: Pithie, R.H.
- Architectural style: Triple arch bridge
- NRHP reference No.: 72000241
- Added to NRHP: October 5, 1972

The Pope Street Bridge is a stone bridge carrying Pope Street over the Napa River in St. Helena, California. Built by R. H. Pithie in 1894, the bridge is the oldest stone bridge in Napa County. The triple arch bridge is 175 feet (53 m) long and 18 feet (5.5 m) wide and cost $14,500 to build. The stone used to build the bridge came from a local quarry on Monticello Road near Mount George Grade. The bridge was designed for horse-drawn vehicles but has withstood automobile traffic; it also survived the 1906 San Francisco earthquake without damage.

The bridge was added to the National Register of Historic Places on October 5, 1972.
