= Brown Estate =

American winery

Brown Estate Vineyards
- Location: St. Helena, California, USA
- Coordinates: 38.2985° N, 122.2871° W
- Appellation: Napa Valley
- Founded: 1995
- First vintage: 1996
- Key people: C. Deneen Brown, President; David F. Brown, Brown Estate Winemaker; Coral E. Brown, House of Brown Director of Winemaking; Stefanie Kelly, General Manager
- Known for: Napa Valley Zinfandel
- Varietals: Zinfandel, Cabernet Sauvignon, Chardonnay, Petite Sirah
- Distribution: national
- Website: http://www.brownestate.com

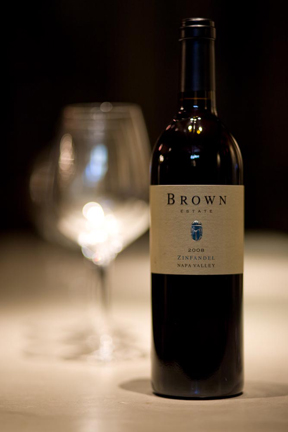
Brown Estate 2008 Napa Valley Zinfandel

Brown Estate Vineyards is a winery located in St. Helena, Napa Valley. Brown Estate produces varietal wines, including Zinfandel, Cabernet Sauvignon, Chardonnay, and Petite Sirah. Founded in 1995 by siblings Deneen, David, and Coral Brown, Brown Estate Vineyard released its first Zinfandel in 1996. It is recognized as the first and only Black-owned estate winery in Napa Valley. The Brown family began their involvement in the wine industry by farming grapes and selling them to established winemakers, before launching their own label.

== History ==
In 1980, Jamaican-born Bassett Brown and Panamanian-born Marcela Abrahams Brown acquired 450 acres (1.8 km^{2}) in the Chiles Valley AVA of Napa Valley. Abandoned ten years prior, the land and its two structures—an 1859 stone and redwood barn and an 1885 Queen Anne Victorian home—were derelict. The Browns cut roads and installed plumbing and electricity, earning them a naward from Napa County Historical Society. In 1985, they planted their first vineyard, approximately 9 ha (22 acres) of zinfandel. The Chiles Valley microclimate, characterized by extreme temperature shifts each day, suited the Zinfandel cultivation. The Brown family's fruit gained popularity among zinfandel producers such as Green & Red and T-Vine Cellars, who purchased Brown Estate fruit for many years. The Browns also sold Cabernet Sauvignon to Mike Grgich. Through a series of apprenticeships, winemakers who were working with his fruit learned winemaking.

In the mid-1990s, due to rising demand fruit, Deneen and David, both residing in the vineyard, decided to produce wine under their own label. They secured a crush contract with Rombauer Vineyards in Saint Helena. For six years, they produced wines at the Rombauer facility. On January 29, 2000, Brown Estate debuted their first two vintages of Napa Valley Zinfandel, for 1996 and 1997, at the annual Zinfandel Advocates and Producers (ZAP) tasting at Fort Mason in San Francisco. In the January, 2000 issue of the Wine Spectator, the 1997 Brown Estate Zinfandel received a score of 91 points.

== Fire ==
In June 2000, a fire broke out at their warehouse. Sixteen bottles survived - two that went to Robert M. Parker, Jr. for review, two that went to Christie's for auction, and twelve that the Browns stored at home - their 1998 zinfandel was destroyed, as were the remaining cases of their first two vintages. The Browns fell out of the zinfandel market for a year, a setback mitigated by the restaurant and retail accounts that held space on their wine lists and shelves for the next vintage. In response to the fire, the Browns accelerated the release of their 1999 Napa Valley zinfandel, which they showed at ZAP in 2001. In December 2000, Parker gave the Brown 1998 Zinfandel a score of 90, noting that his review was "of academic interest only" since all of the wine had perished in the fire. The loss of the 1998 vintage kept Brown Estate's Napa Valley Zinfandel bottlings on an early release schedule.
