= St. Helena, California =

- City
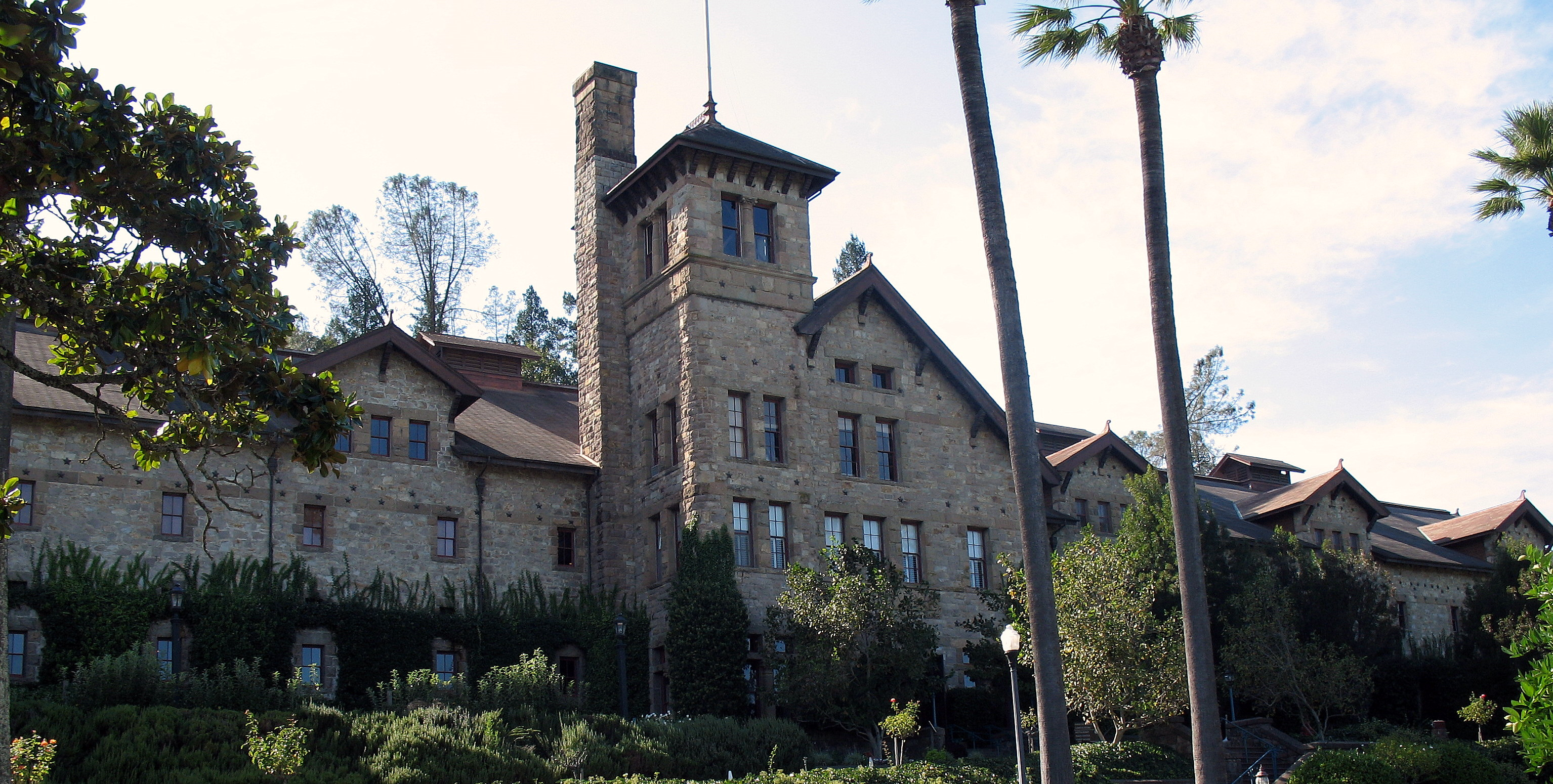
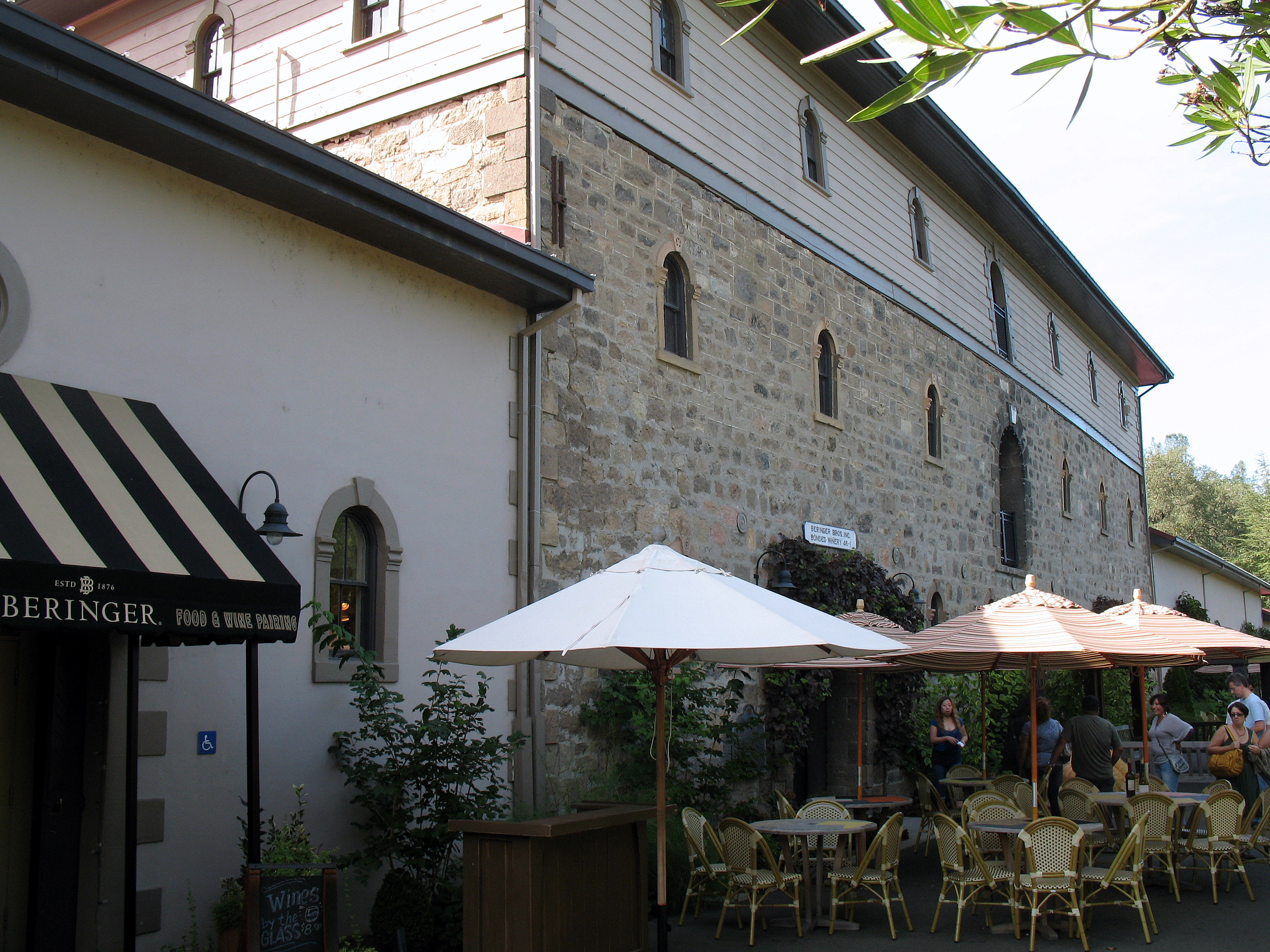
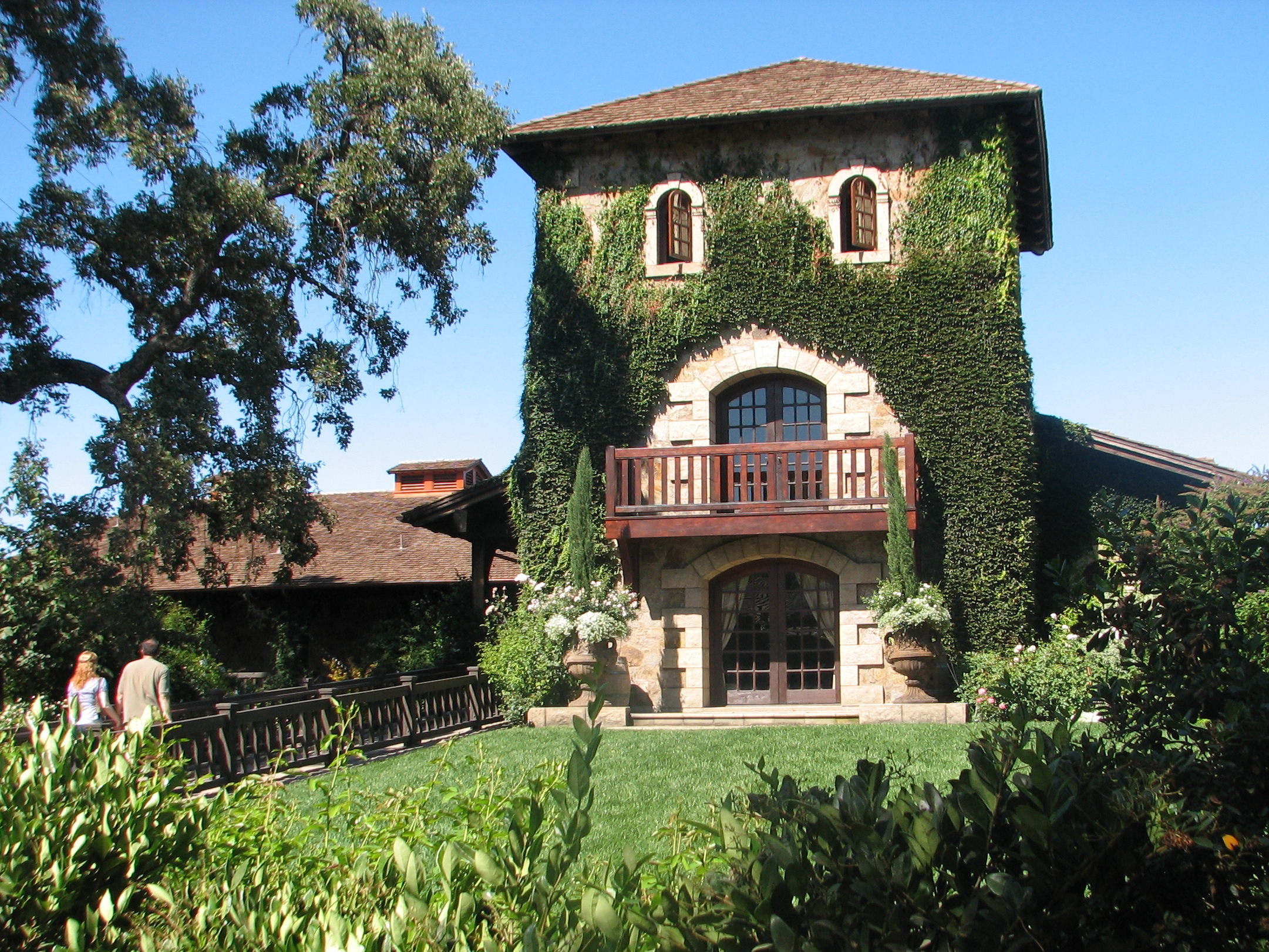
- Clockwise: The Culinary Institute of America at Greystone; V. Sattui Winery; the Richie Block downtown; former train depot; Beringer Vineyards
- Motto: "Napa Valley's Main Street"
- Interactive map of St. Helena, California
- Coordinates: 38°30′19″N 122°28′13″W
- Country: United States
- State: California
- County: Napa
- Incorporated: March 24, 1876
- Re-incorporated: May 14, 1889
- Named for: Mount Saint Helena

Government
  - Type: Council–manager
  - Mayor: Paul Dohring

Area
  - City: 5.08 sq mi (13.16 km^{2})
  - Land: 4.95 sq mi (12.83 km^{2})
  - Water: 0.13 sq mi (0.33 km^{2}) 2.48%
- Elevation: 253 ft (77 m)

Population (2020)
  - City: 5,430
  - Density: 1,231.5/sq mi (475.49/km^{2})
  - Metro: 138,019
- Time zone: UTC-8 (Pacific)
  - Summer (DST): UTC-7 (PDT)
- ZIP code: 94574
- Area code: 707
- FIPS code: 06-64140
- GNIS feature IDs: 277588, 2411758
- Website: www.cityofsthelena.gov

St. Helena (/həˈliːnə/ hə-LEE-nə) is a city in Napa County, California, United States. Located in the North Bay region of the San Francisco Bay Area, the population was 5,430 at the 2020 census.

St. Helena is a popular tourist destination, owing to its vineyards and culinary scene. The city is the center of St. Helena American Viticultural Area (AVA), which expands 9,060 acres (14 sq mi) of the Napa Valley with over 400 vineyards encompassing 6,800 acres (2,800 ha) of cultivation. St. Helena is the location of The Culinary Institute of America at Greystone and a campus of Napa Valley College.

== History ==
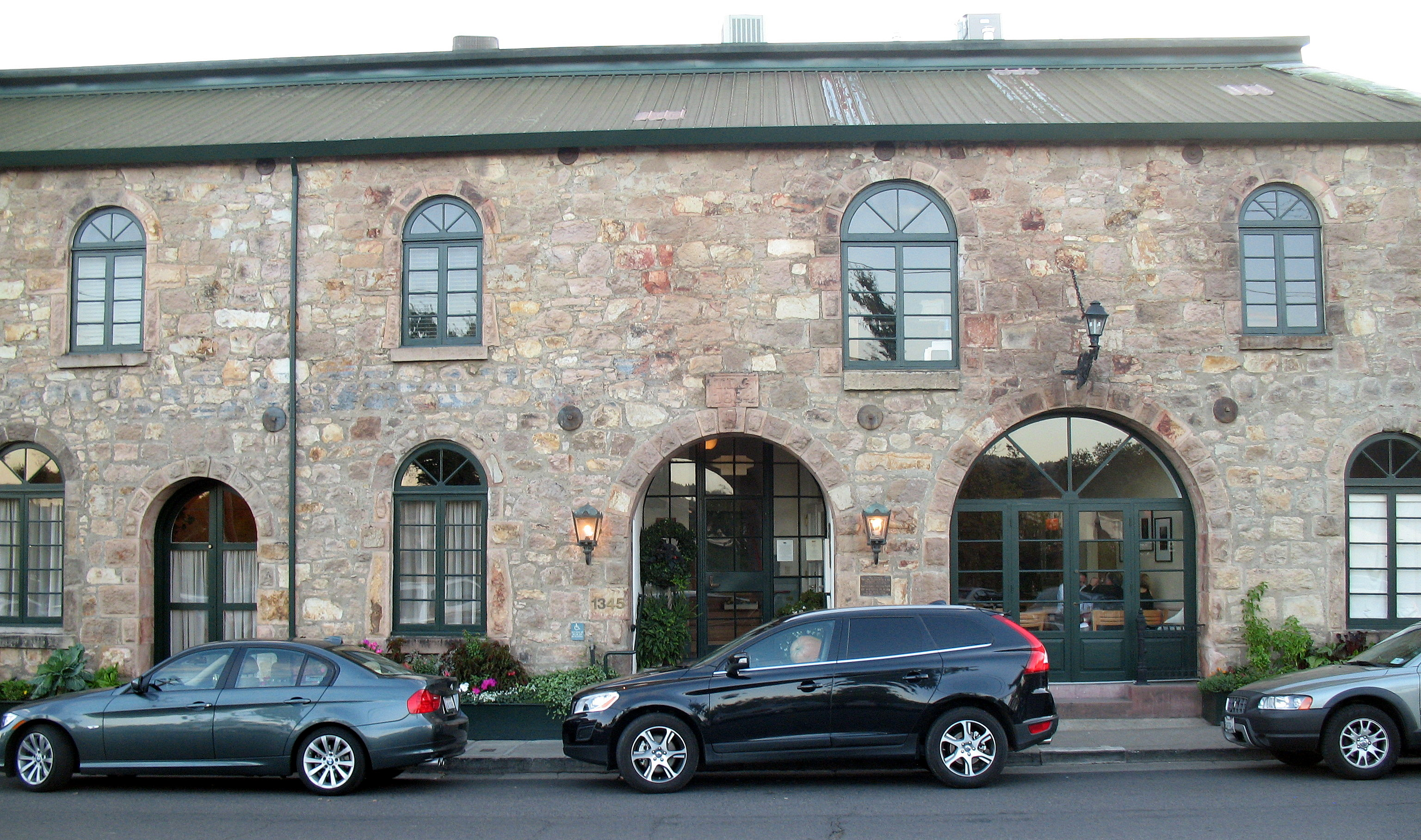
The Taylor, Duckworth, & Company Foundry, built 1884

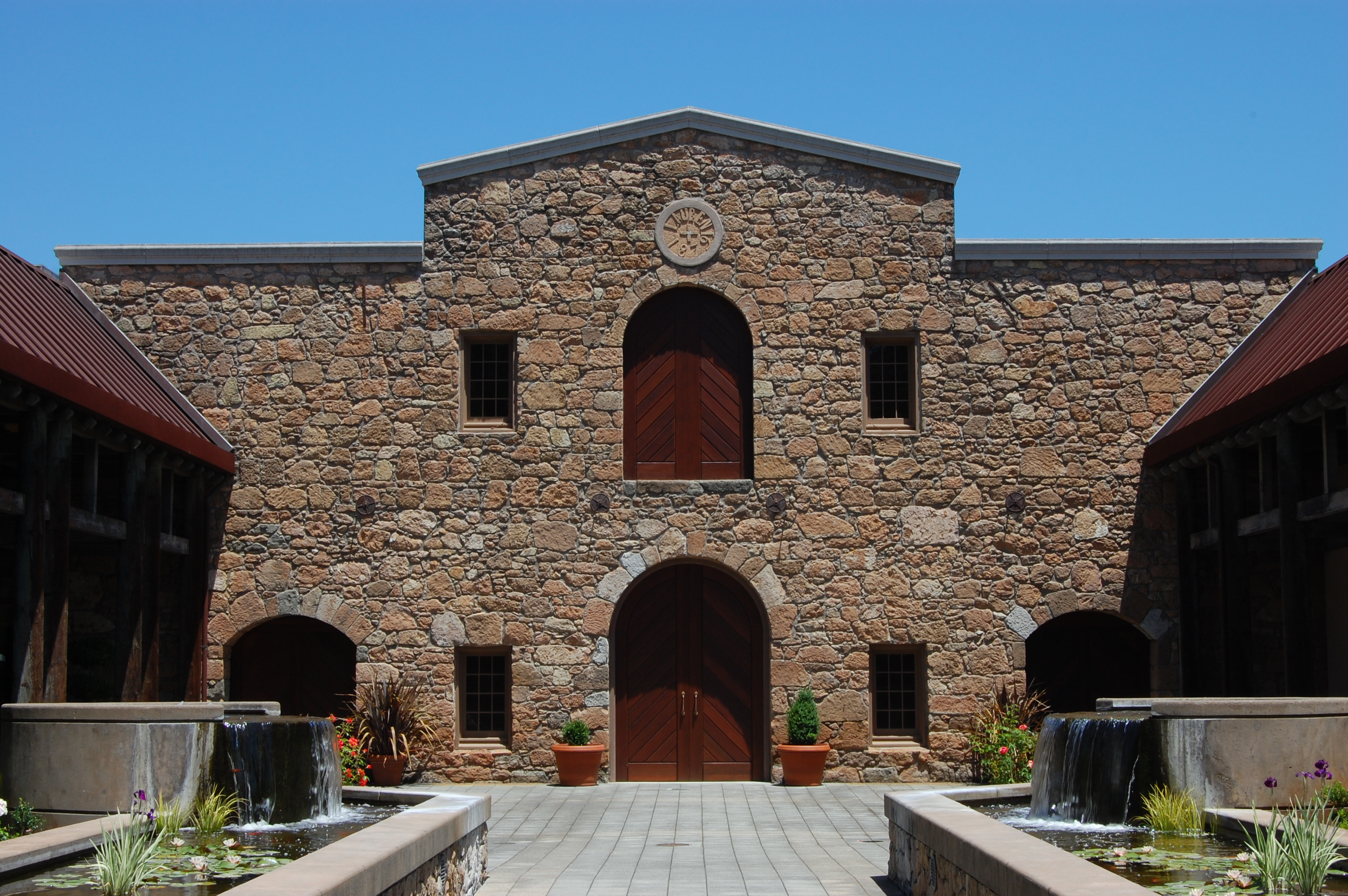
Markham Vineyards, founded 1874

St. Helena was first inhabited by a native American group known as the Wappo people. They spoke Yukian and are believed to have first settled in St. Helena as early as 2000 B.C. The Wappo name for the area is Anakotanoma, meaning 'Bull Snake Village'.

The area was likely named after a nearby mountain known as Mount St. Helena.

The locale became renowned when White Sulphur Springs was discovered in 1848 and established as an operating resort in 1852. During the later 19th century, affluent San Franciscans traveled here by steamer across the Bay, and then four miles by stage and later by train. At its prime, California's oldest resort was able to accommodate 1000 guests in its grand hotels which were later lost to local wildfires. The site is recognized as a National Historic Landmark.

The town of St. Helena was founded by Henry Still and Charles Walters, who bought a 126 acre tract of land lying on the west side of Main Street from Maria Ignacio Soberanes Bale in 1854. By 1858 there was a school house and a little Baptist church. Four years later Professor William Brewer of the Whitney party called it a "pretty little village with fifty or more houses...nestled among grand old oaks." It officially became a town on March 24, 1876, and by 1886 the population grew to 1,800 inhabitants. Shortly after in 1868, the first railroad was created in St. Helena allowing for shipment of resources such as fruit and mining products. The newly built train tracks also brought in tourists.

Ellen White, co-founder of the Seventh-day Adventist Church, had a home called Elmshaven near St. Helena, beginning in 1900. She died there in 1915, and the site is now a National Historic Landmark. Both the Beringer Vineyards and the Charles Krug Winery are California Historical Landmarks.

St. Helena's community center was built as a Carnegie library; it served as the city library from 1908 to 1978.

== Geography ==
St. Helena has a total area of 5.08 sq mi (13.2 km^{2}), of which 4.96 sq mi (12.8 km^{2}) is land and 0.13 sq mi (0.3 km^{2}) (2.48%) is water.

=== Climate ===
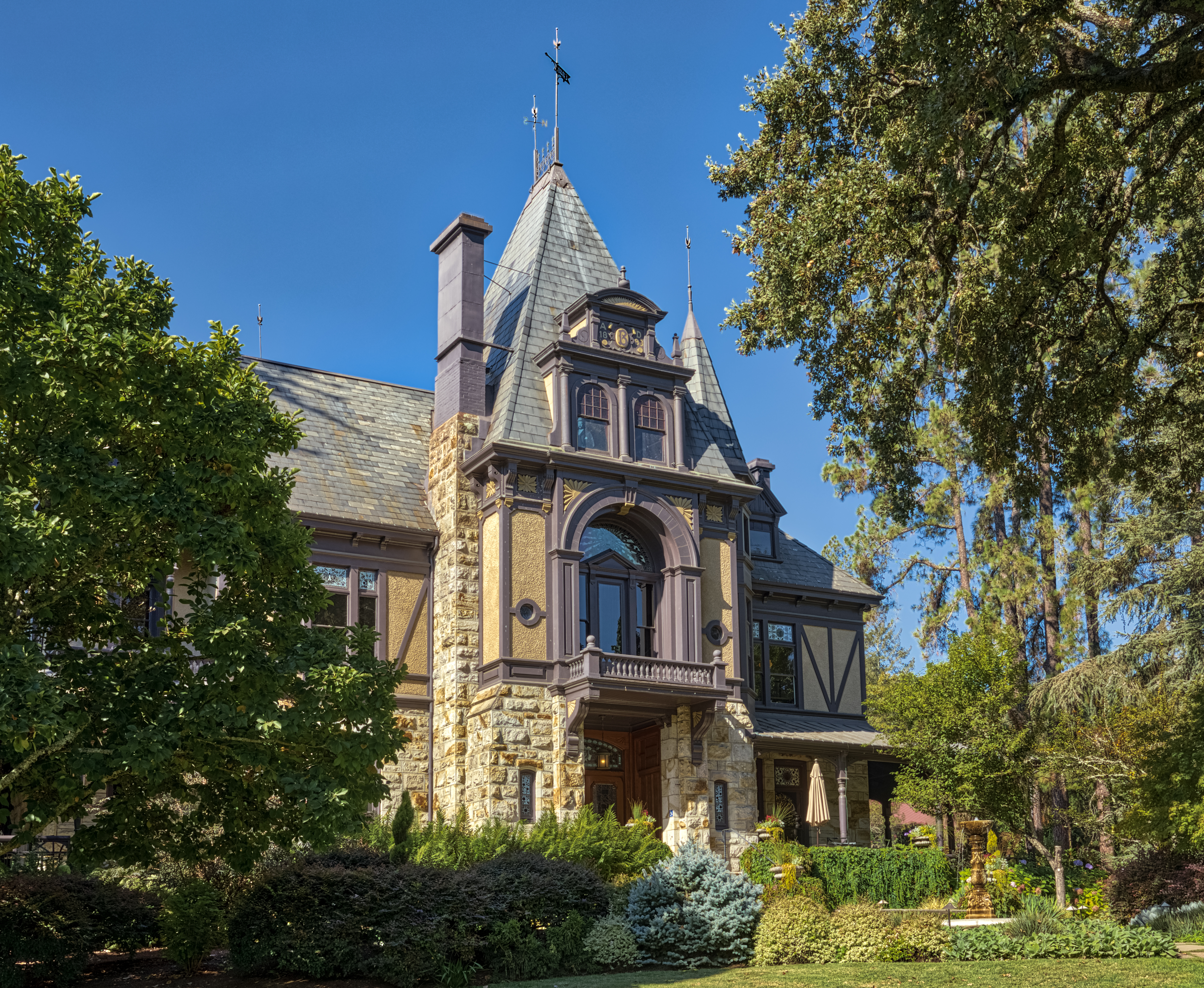
The Rhine House, built 1884

The National Weather Service has a cooperative weather station in St. Helena. Winters are cool and wet, while summers have hot days and cool nights with little precipitation. Average temperatures in December, the coldest month, range from 58.3 °F (14.6 °C) to 39.6 °F (4.2 °C). Average temperatures in July and August, the warmest months, range from 89 °F (32 °C) to 56 °F (13 °C). There are an average of 54.6 days with highs of 90 °F (32 °C) or higher and an average of 13.8 days with lows of 32 °F (0 °C) or lower. The record high temperature was 115 °F (46 °C) on July 13, 1972, and the record low temperature was 11 °F (−12 °C) on December 11, 1932.

Average annual precipitation is 33.97 inches (863 mm). There are an average of 68 days with measurable precipitation. The wettest year was 1983 with 75.40 inches (1,915 mm) and the driest year was 1976 with 10.41 inches (264 mm). The wettest month on record was February 1986 with 25.60 inches (650 mm). The most rainfall in 24 hours was 6.83 inches (173 mm) on January 21, 1967. Although snow rarely falls in St. Helena, there is an annual average snowfall of 0.2-inch (5.1 mm). The most snowfall in one month was 4.0 inches (100 mm), recorded in January 1974 and again in March 1976. The most snowfall in 24 hours was 4.0 inches (100 mm) on March 2, 1976.

Climate data for St. Helena, California, 1991–2020 normals, extremes 1907–present
Month	Jan	Feb	Mar	Apr	May	Jun	Jul	Aug	Sep	Oct	Nov	Dec	Year
Record high °F (°C)	83 (28)	86 (30)	95 (35)	98 (37)	107 (42)	110 (43)	115 (46)	112 (44)	113 (45)	104 (40)	93 (34)	83 (28)	115 (46)
Mean maximum °F (°C)	70.9 (21.6)	75.1 (23.9)	80.8 (27.1)	87.6 (30.9)	93.0 (33.9)	100.9 (38.3)	102.4 (39.1)	102.0 (38.9)	100.4 (38.0)	92.6 (33.7)	79.6 (26.4)	69.6 (20.9)	105.0 (40.6)
Mean daily maximum °F (°C)	58.8 (14.9)	62.5 (16.9)	66.8 (19.3)	71.8 (22.1)	78.1 (25.6)	85.4 (29.7)	88.7 (31.5)	88.8 (31.6)	86.6 (30.3)	78.1 (25.6)	65.8 (18.8)	58.3 (14.6)	74.1 (23.4)
Daily mean °F (°C)	49.5 (9.7)	52.2 (11.2)	55.4 (13.0)	59.0 (15.0)	64.3 (17.9)	69.8 (21.0)	72.4 (22.4)	72.3 (22.4)	70.2 (21.2)	63.7 (17.6)	54.7 (12.6)	48.9 (9.4)	61.0 (16.1)
Mean daily minimum °F (°C)	40.2 (4.6)	41.9 (5.5)	43.9 (6.6)	46.3 (7.9)	50.5 (10.3)	54.2 (12.3)	56.0 (13.3)	55.7 (13.2)	53.8 (12.1)	49.4 (9.7)	43.7 (6.5)	39.6 (4.2)	47.9 (8.8)
Mean minimum °F (°C)	29.9 (−1.2)	32.0 (0.0)	34.8 (1.6)	37.1 (2.8)	42.0 (5.6)	46.3 (7.9)	49.9 (9.9)	50.1 (10.1)	45.8 (7.7)	39.8 (4.3)	32.2 (0.1)	28.2 (−2.1)	26.3 (−3.2)
Record low °F (°C)	16 (−9)	18 (−8)	24 (−4)	27 (−3)	31 (−1)	36 (2)	37 (3)	38 (3)	33 (1)	22 (−6)	11 (−12)	13 (−11)	11 (−12)
Average precipitation inches (mm)	6.47 (164)	6.71 (170)	4.98 (126)	1.97 (50)	1.31 (33)	0.35 (8.9)	0.01 (0.25)	0.04 (1.0)	0.06 (1.5)	1.65 (42)	3.24 (82)	7.18 (182)	33.97 (863)
Average precipitation days (≥ 0.01 in)	13.3	10.6	10.4	5.5	3.4	0.8	0.2	0.1	0.5	3.3	8.1	12.9	69.1
Source 1: NOAA
Source 2: National Weather Service

== Demographics ==
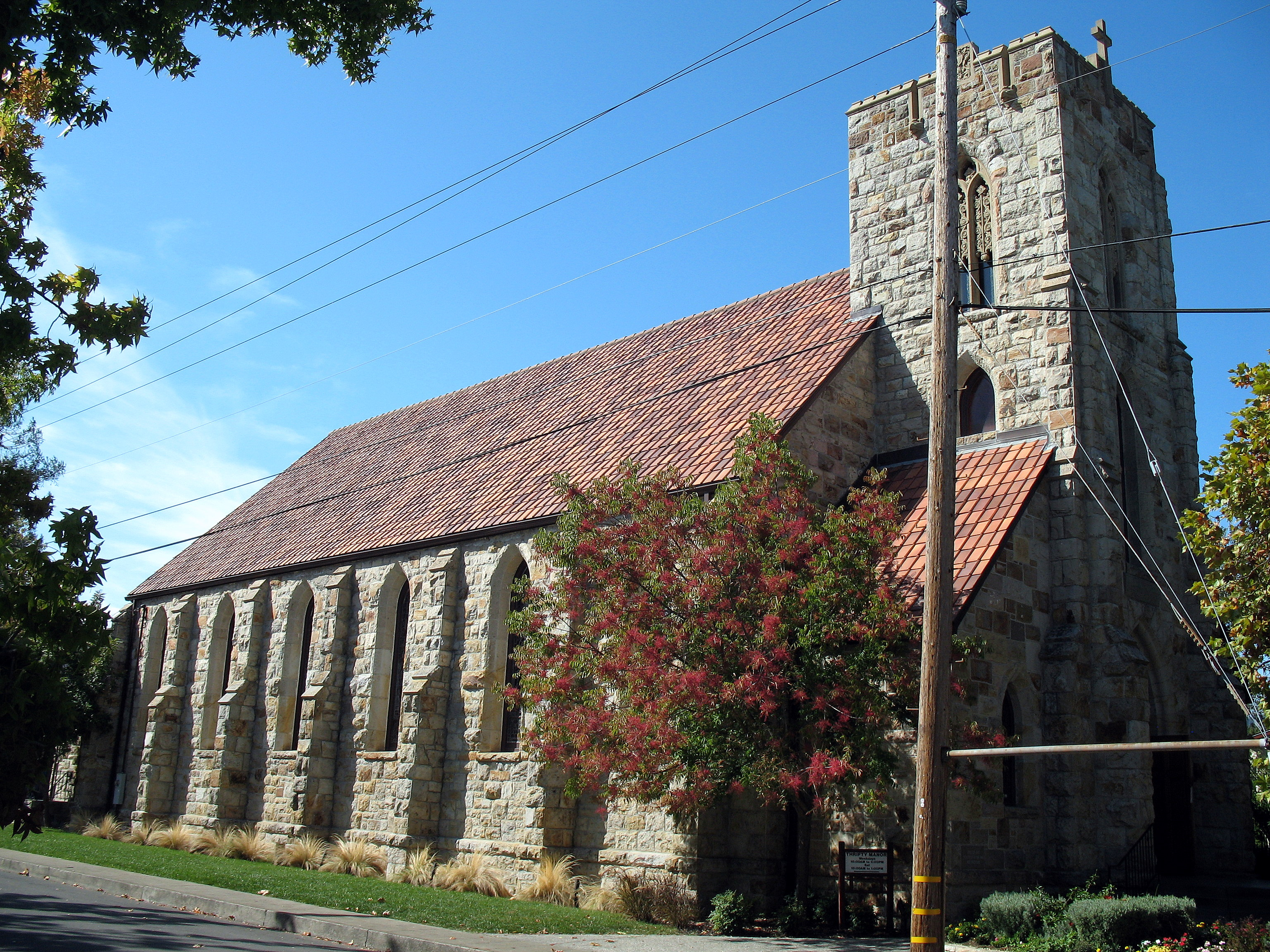
St. Helena Catholic Church

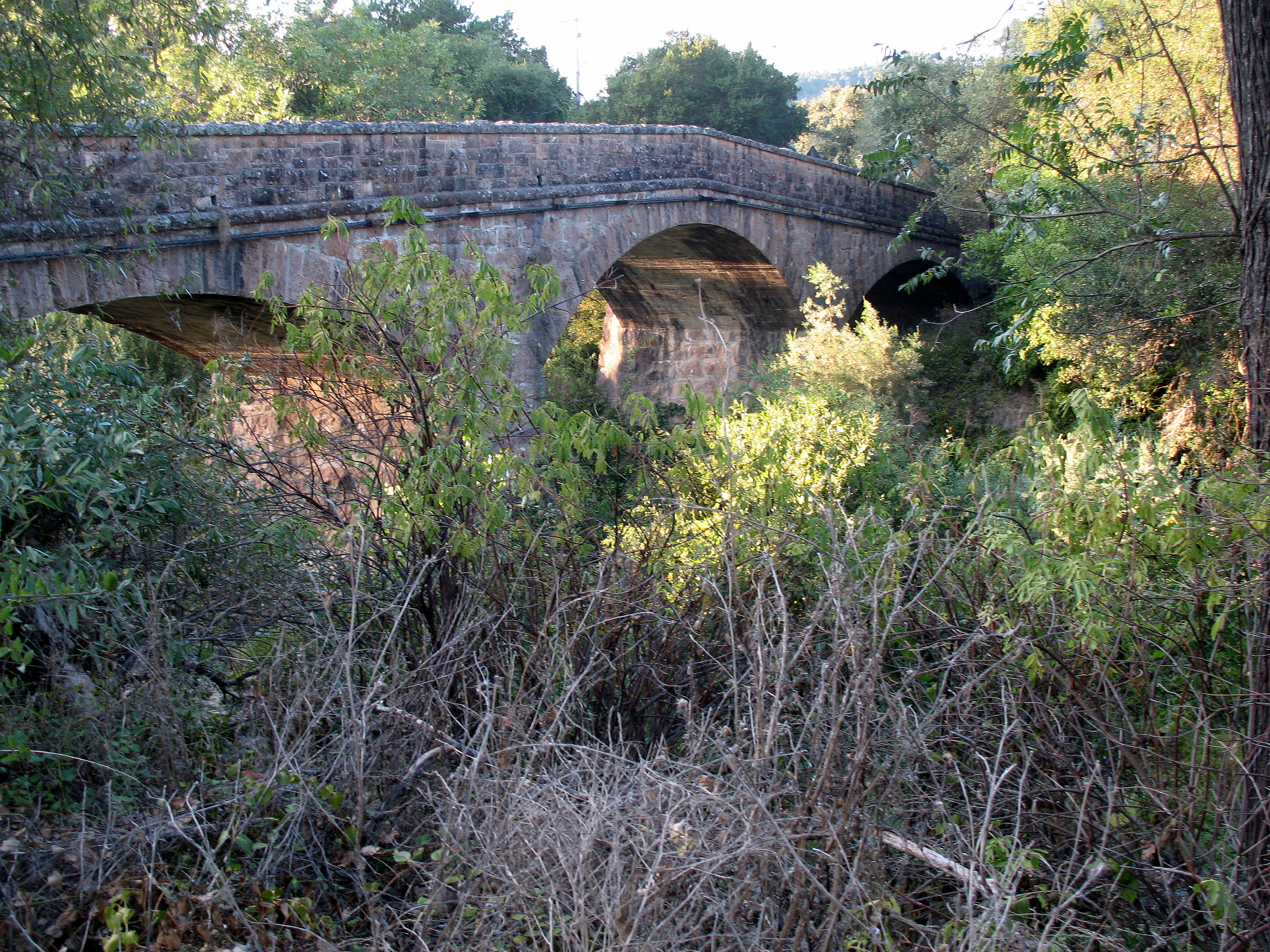
Pope Street Bridge

Historical population
Census	Pop.	Note	%±
1880	1,339		—
1890	1,705		27.3%
1900	1,582		−7.2%
1910	1,603		1.3%
1920	1,346		−16.0%
1930	1,582		17.5%
1940	1,758		11.1%
1950	2,297		30.7%
1960	2,722		18.5%
1970	3,173		16.6%
1980	4,898		54.4%
1990	4,990		1.9%
2000	5,950		19.2%
2010	5,814		−2.3%
2020	5,430		−6.6%
U.S. Decennial Census

=== 2020 census ===
As of the 2020 census, St. Helena had a population of 5,430 and a population density of 1,095.9 inhabitants per square mile (423.1/km^{2}). The median age was 48.0 years. The age distribution was 19.2% under the age of 18, 6.6% from age 18 to 24, 20.2% from age 25 to 44, 27.1% from age 45 to 64, and 26.8% age 65 or older. For every 100 females, there were 87.8 males, and for every 100 females age 18 and over, there were 84.6 males age 18 and over.

The census reported that 99.2% of residents lived in households and 0.8% lived in non-institutionalized group quarters; no residents were institutionalized. 97.5% of residents lived in urban areas, while 2.5% lived in rural areas.

There were 2,337 households, of which 27.7% had children under the age of 18 living in them. Of all households, 46.8% were married-couple households, 5.0% were cohabiting couple households, 14.2% had a male householder with no spouse or partner present, and 34.0% had a female householder with no spouse or partner present. About 32.5% of households were made up of individuals, and 19.3% had someone living alone who was 65 years of age or older. The average household size was 2.3. There were 1,426 families (61.0% of all households).

There were 2,812 housing units at an average density of 567.5 units per square mile (219.1 units/km^{2}). Of all housing units, 16.9% were vacant and 83.1% were occupied. Among occupied units, 54.9% were owner-occupied and 45.1% were renter-occupied. The homeowner vacancy rate was 1.9%, and the rental vacancy rate was 6.8%.

Racial composition as of the 2020 census
Race	Number	Percent
White	3,498	64.4%
Black or African American	14	0.3%
American Indian and Alaska Native	61	1.1%
Asian	94	1.7%
Native Hawaiian and Other Pacific Islander	6	0.1%
Some other race	1,031	19.0%
Two or more races	726	13.4%
Hispanic or Latino (of any race)	1,863	34.3%

== Economy ==
Major employers in St. Helena include Trinchero Family Estates, Beringer Vineyards, and The Culinary Institute of America. The city is distinct in its regulation against chain restaurants; only one existed in the city – an A&W – established before the legislation was enacted but permanently closed March 31, 2026. The St. Helena AVA was designated in 1995 for the valley region surrounding the town. Duckhorn Vineyards, Newton Vineyard, Charles Krug Winery, Brown Estate and numerous other vineyards and wineries exist near St. Helena. Adventist Health St. Helena is located in neighboring Deer Park.

== Government ==
St. Helena is a general law city which lacks its own charter. It operates under a council–manager form of government. In the California State Legislature, St. Helena is in the 3rd senatorial district, represented by Democrat Christopher Cabaldon, and in the 4th Assembly district, represented by Democrat Cecilia Aguiar-Curry. In the United States House of Representatives, St. Helena is in California's 4th congressional district, represented by Democrat Mike Thompson.

== Education ==
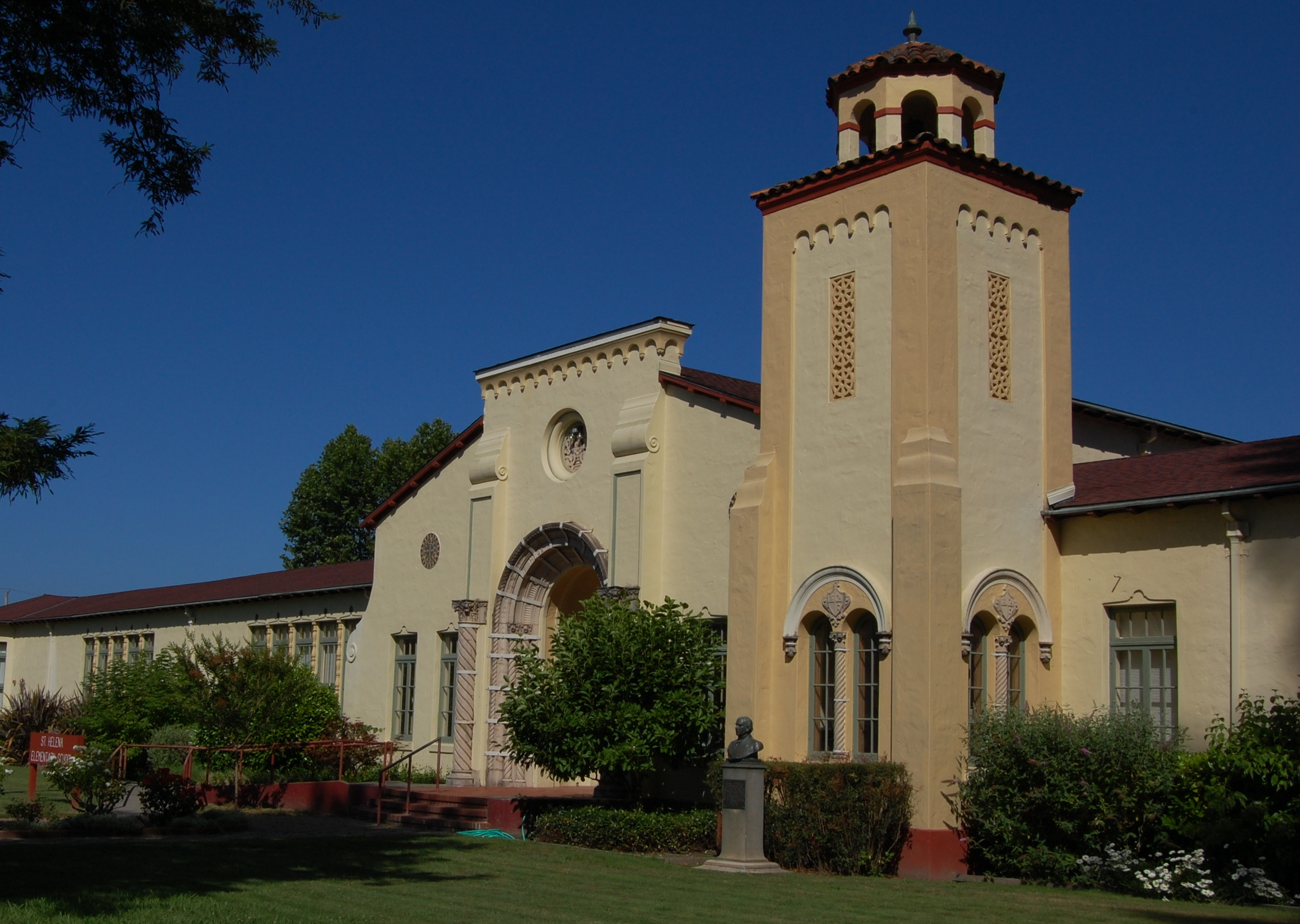
The Spanish Colonial Revival style St. Helena Elementary School

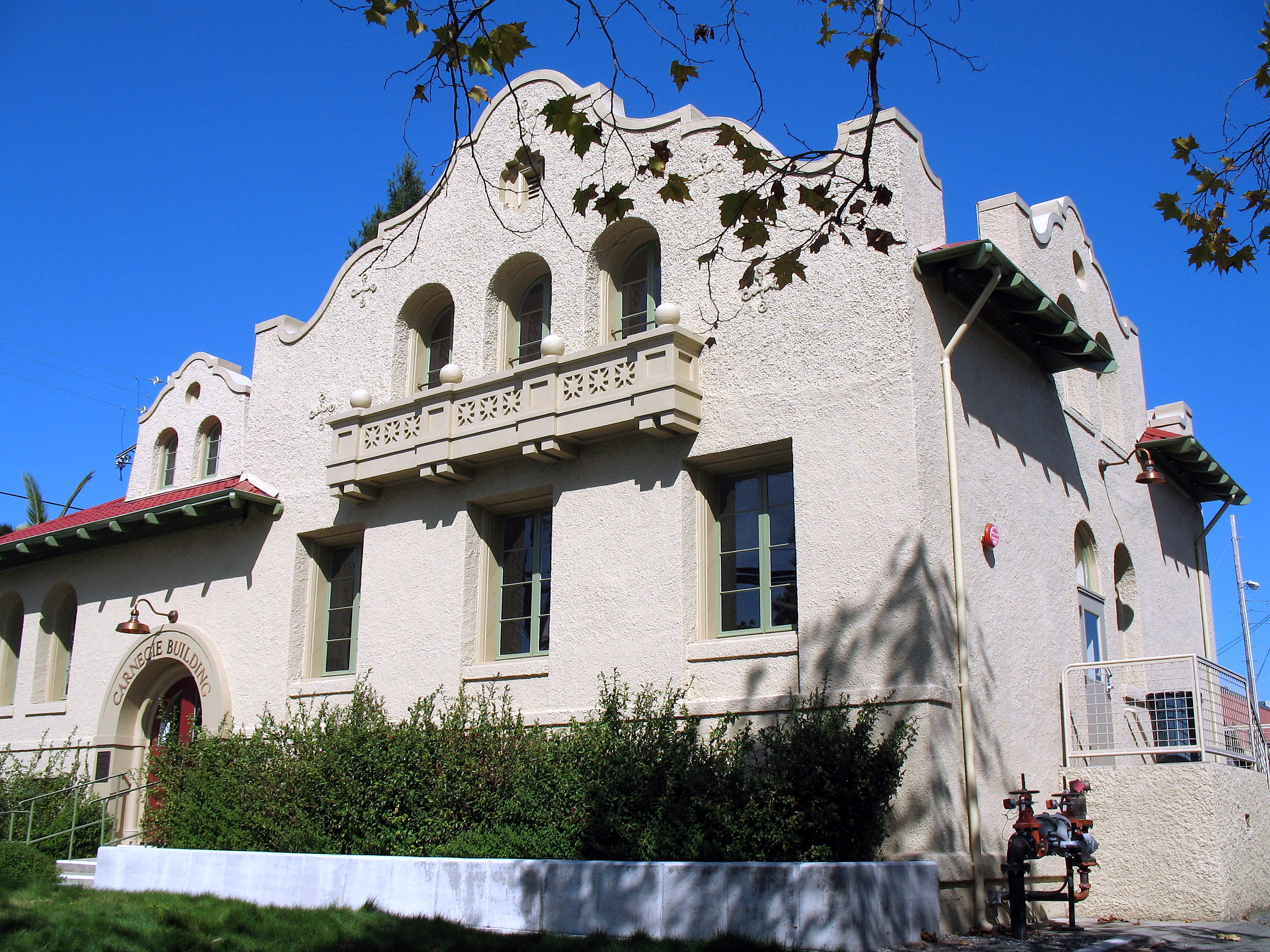
The Mission Revival style Carnegie Building, built in 1908

Saint Helena Unified School District is the local school district. Saint Helena Primary School teaches kindergarten through second grade. Saint Helena Elementary School teaches grades three through five, and is ranked as the #2 best public school in the Napa Valley. Robert Louis Stevenson Middle School teaches grades six through eight; it is ranked as the #1 best public middle school in the Napa Valley, with a teacher to student ratio of 13:1. St. Helena High School teaches grades nine through twelve; it is ranked as the #1 best public school in the Napa Valley.

The city has two tertiary campuses: the Upper Valley Campus of Napa Valley College, and The Culinary Institute of America at Greystone, a branch campus of the main institution in Hyde Park, New York.

== Notable people ==
- Michela Alioto-Pier, former member of the San Francisco Board of Supervisors
- Aaron Barak, City Councilmember and former CTO of King County
- Charles J. Beerstecher, Railroad Commissioner and Town Attorney
- David Duncan, vintner
- Louise E. Francis, journalist
- William Hamilton, cartoonist and playwright
- Siegfried Horn, archaeologist and Biblical scholar
- William B. Hurlbut, born in St. Helena, raised in NY, professor at Stanford University Medical Center
- Charles Krug, winemaker
- Bob Marshall, mayor of San Bruno, California
- Fritz Maytag, businessman
- Donald C. McRuer, congressman
- Peter Newton, winemaker
- Charles O'Rear, photographer
- Carl Osburn, naval officer and sports shooter
- Frank K. Richardson, associate justice of the California Supreme Court
- Dave Smith, engineer and musician
- Edwin R. Thiele, missionary, writer and archaeologist
- Mike Thompson, U.S. Representative for California's 5th congressional district, St. Helena native and lifelong resident
- Josephine Tychson, the first woman to build and operate a winery in California
- Owen Wade, State Assemblyman
- Ellen G. White, author and co-founder of the Seventh-day Adventist Church.

== In popular culture ==
- One of Disney's classic movies "Pollyanna" was filmed on Railroad Avenue in Saint Helena in 1960.
- The Elvis Presley 1961 release, "Wild in the Country", was filmed in a small Saint Helena house now known as a popular inn called The Ink House.
- "A Walk in the Clouds" (1995) was filmed in northern Saint Helena. The movie depicts a love story involving a daughter of a vineyard owner.
- "Patch Adams" (1989) starring Robin Williams had a scene filmed at the picturesque cemetery in St. Helena.
- The "When Death Comes Calling" episode (S6.E2, 2013) of My Ghost Story was filmed at a winery in the city.

== See also ==
- List of cities and towns in California
- List of cities and towns in the San Francisco Bay Area
- Tree City USA
