= Jess Stonestreet Jackson Jr. =

American businessman (1930-2011)

Jess Stonestreet Jackson
- Born: Jess Stonestreet Jackson; February 18, 1930; Los Angeles, California
- Died: April 21, 2011 (aged 81); Geyserville, California
- Education: University of California, Berkeley
- Occupations: Land Use Attorney, Wine Entrepreneur, Horse Racing owner and breeder
- Spouses: Jane Kendall Jackson; Barbara Banke
- Parents: Jesse Stonestreet Jackson Sr.; Gertrude Ursula (née Brock) Jackson

Jess Stonestreet Jackson Jr. (February 18, 1930 – April 21, 2011) was an American billionaire wine entrepreneur, lawyer, racehorse owner, and businessman. He started the Kendall-Jackson wine business with his first wife, Jane Kendall (Wadlow) Jackson. The family's 1974 purchase of an 80-acre (32 ha) pear and walnut orchard in Lakeport, California, was converted to a vineyard. As of 2010, Vintner's Reserve Chardonnay was one of the most popular wines on the market.

== Early life and education ==
Jess Jackson was born to Gertrude Ursula (née Brock) Jackson and Jesse Stonestreet Jackson, and grew up in San Francisco's Sunset District. during the Great Depression. His father, a teacher, was out of work three times while he was growing up, and there were times when the family had to survive on rice. To help support his family, Jackson started working at an early age. From the age of five, when he got his first job as a paper boy, he worked a variety of jobs including candy maker, a soda jerk, a temp at the post office, a hops picker, a longshoreman, a teamster, a lifeguard, and an ambulance driver.

Jackson graduated from San Francisco's Abraham Lincoln High School. He earned a law degree from the University of California, Berkeley. While studying law he worked as a dock laborer, a Berkeley policeman, and an ambulance driver to put himself through school. Upon his graduation from Berkeley in 1951, Jackson started practicing real estate law.

== Career ==
In the late 1950s, Jess Jackson started a law firm in the San Francisco area, specializing in property rights issues. Jackson was one of the founding members of the American California Trial Lawyers Association. In the 1970s, he was also one of the four founding members of Decimus, a company that leased IBM mainframe computers to corporations.

Jess Jackson, owner of Jackson Family Wines and Stonestreet Farms

== Wine production ==
In 1974, Jackson and his first wife, Jane Kendall Jackson, purchased an 80-acre pear-and-walnut orchard in Lakeport. He converted it to growing Chardonnay and other varietals after realizing that there was increasing demand for high-quality grapes in the area. He sold the property's grapes to local wineries until 1981, when a down market led to a surplus of grapes on the market. Faced with the prospect of selling his grapes for a price that wouldn't cover the costs of growing them, he decided to make his own wine, and hired winemaker Jed Steele. Jackson decided to produce affordable wines with an emphasis on quality, and, two years later, the first Kendall-Jackson Vintner's Reserve Chardonnay was released. The resulting somewhat off-dry wine was bottled, and became an instant sensation. That year it became the first wine ever to win a Platinum Award from the American Wine Competition. After bottles were sent by a Sacramento wine buyer to the Reagan White House in 1984, it became the First Lady's favorite, and the K-J Chardonnay was soon nicknamed "Nancy's wine" by San Francisco Chronicle's columnist Herb Caen.

Jackson and Kendall divorced in the early 1980s and Jackson later married Barbara Banke. Banke became his co-manager of their wine businesses. Jackson and Banke continued to expand their business, eventually owning about 25,000 acres (39 sq mi) in California, 14,000 acres (5,666 ha) of which were planted with wine grapes.

In 1992, Jackson prevailed in a highly contentious lawsuit against his former winemaker Jed Steele that prohibited Steele from revealing the formula for the Vintner's Reserve Chardonnay. In 1997, Jackson lost a lawsuit against E & J Gallo Winery in which he alleged that Gallo's Turning Leaf label was a ripoff of his Vintner's Reserve.

Among the wineries in his Jackson Family Wines portfolio, as of 2009, are Kendall-Jackson, Murphy-Goode, and Robert Pecota Winery. As of early 2009, it was ranked as the ninth largest winery holding company in the United States. Jackson's brands at the time of his death were producing 5 million cases of wine annually.

In 2005, Jackson was listed by Forbes magazine as tied for the 366th wealthiest person in the world, with $1.8 billion in assets. The 2010 list by Forbes magazine placed Jackson as the 536th richest person in the world, with $1.9 billion in assets.

=== Vintner's Reserve Chardonnay ===
Kendall-Jackson Vintner's Reserve Chardonnay debuted in 1982 with a 16,000-case production. In 1983, Vintner's Reserve Chardonnay won first ever Platinum Award from the American Wine Competition. American's demand for Chardonnay picked up at the same time.

Kendall-Jackson Vintner's Reserve help Chardonnay become the most popular grape varietal amongst American wine drinkers. Vintner's Reserve Chardonnay is the most popular selling wine made from that varietal, which makes it the most popular wine in America.

Ray Isle of Food and Wine Magazine ranked Vintner's Reserve Chardonnay as one of his "50 Wines You Can Always Trust" in April 2007.

A People Magazine article also reported that Barack Obama owned a bottle of the company's chardonnay.

== Vintner's Hall of Fame ==
Jess Jackson was inducted into the Vintner's Hall of Fame in 2009 for his outstanding contributions to the wine industry. He was among several others being inducted that year, including winemaker Warren Winiarski, whose Stag's Leap Cabernet Sauvignon won first place over Chateau Mouton Rothschild and Chateau Haut-Brion in the 1976 Judgment of Paris, and the Beringer Brothers, whose wines helped to establish Napa Valley's reputation as a top grape-growing region.

== Thoroughbred racing ==
In 2007, Jackson bought a controlling interest in the champion racehorse Curlin, who won the Preakness Stakes and the Breeders' Cup Classic that year. In 2008, the horse won the $6 million Dubai World Cup.

Jackson won the Sportsman of the Year 2008 Insider Award: "To owner Jess Jackson for believing in the greatness of his beloved Curlin then went above and beyond the call to prove it."

Jackson's investments in racehorses totaled over $200 million.

== Death ==
After several years of treatment for melanoma, Jackson died on April 21, 2011. He was buried in a newly created 12,000 square-foot cemetery on an Alexander Valley hilltop.

== See also ==
- List of wine personalities
