= Jackson Family Wines =

Wine company based in Santa Rosa, California, US

- Location: Santa Rosa, California
- Founded: 1982
- First vintage: 1983
- Key people: Jess Jackson, founder Barbara Banke, Chairman & Proprietor; Don Hartford, Vice Chairman
- Area cultivated: 50,000 (20,000 ha)
- Cases/yr: 6 million
- Website: jacksonfamilywines.com

Jackson Family Wines is a wine company headquartered in Santa Rosa, California. At 6 million cases sold per year, it is the ninth-largest wine producer in the United States. Jackson Family Wines includes 40 brands, sourced from vineyards and wineries in California, Oregon, the Bordeaux region in France, Tuscany in Italy, Australia, Chile and South Africa. It controls 50,000 acres (20,000 ha) in the United States and is the largest owner of coastal vineyards in California and Oregon. The family-owned company is known for the brand Kendall-Jackson.

== History ==
=== Early history ===
In 1974, Jess Jackson purchased an 80-acre (32 ha) orchard in Northern California. He planted grapes on the land to attempt winemaking. Jackson Family Wines was founded in 1982, and its first vintage of Kendall-Jackson Vintner's Reserve Chardonnay (1982) was released in 1983.

In 1986, Jackson Family Wines purchased part of Tepusquet Vineyard in the Santa Maria Valley and established Cambria Winery. It established Stonestreet Winery in 1989 in the Alexander Valley. The company expanded into Sonoma and Mendocino counties in 1989, and the central and southern California coast in 1991. In 1993, it acquired La Crema winery in Windsor, California. In 1994, Jackson Family Wines acquired Tenuta di Arceno in Tuscany.

It purchased Alexander Mountain Estate in 1995. In 1996, the company purchased Liparita Vineyard, which was renamed W.S. Keyes Vineyard. Jackson Family Wines established Carmel Road Winery in Monterey, California in 1997 and Vérité in Sonoma in 1998. The following year, it purchased the El Maitén estate in Chile.

=== Expansion ===
Jackson Family Wines expanded to Australia in 2000 with the acquisition of 430 acres (172 ha) Eringa Park vineyard, which was renamed Yangarra Estate Vineyard. That same year, the company acquired Matanzas Creek Winery in Sonoma Valley. It continued an international expansion with the purchase of Château Lassègue in Bordeaux, France in 2003. La Jota Vineyard Co. on Howell Mountain was acquired by Jackson Family Wines in 2005. In 2006, the company acquired Byron Winery, Freemark Abbey, Arrowood and Murphy-Goode Estate Winery in Alexander Valley.

The company planted Périgord truffle spores in its hazelnut and white oak orchard in 2011. Its first truffle harvest in 2017 produced 17 fungi. It acquired Hickinbotham Clarendon Vineyard in South Australia in February 2012. The following June, Jackson Family Wines acquired Ramal West Vineyard in the Sonoma Coast. In November 2012, Jackson Family Wines acquired the property that contained Richard's Grove and Saralee's Vineyard.

In 2013, the Jess S. Jackson Sustainable Winery Building opened at the University of California, Davis after the Jackson family donated $3 million for the construction of a testing ground for environmentally friendly technologies. That same year, Jackson Family Wines established Capensis, a winery in South Africa. Capensis Chardonnay is produced using grapes from across the Western Cape, including the Fijnbosch vineyard. Yverdon vineyard on Napa's Spring Mountain was purchased by the company in 2013. Jackson Family Wines also acquired Zena Crown Vineyard in Yamhill, Oregon in 2013, and established the Gran Moraine Winery in Yamhill in 2014.

It acquired Siduri and Novy Family Wines in 2015. Siduri was founded in 1994 by Adam and Dianna Novy Lee. It was the first acquisition by Jackson Family Wines that did not include vineyards. In 2016, Jackson Family Wines acquired Penner-Ash Wine Cellars and WillaKenzie Estate in Oregon, Copain Wines in Healdsburg, California, and Field Stone Winery in Sonoma County's Alexander Valley.

It was announced that the company was building a new winery in Oregon in March 2017. In April 2017, the Culinary Institute of America at Copia announced it had renamed its amphitheater Jackson Family Wines Amphitheater in honor of a $2 million gift from the family to the culinary college. At the Sonoma County Farm Bureau's Love of the Land event in July 2017, Jackson Family Wines was recognized with the Luther Burbank Conservation Award for its practices and commitment to sustainability. In May 2017, it was announced that the company was acquiring Brewer-Clifton, a Pinot Noir-based winery, including its brand Diatom as well as 60 acres (24 ha) of vineyards and a winery and tasting room in Lompoc, California. Brewer-Clifton was founded by Greg Brewer and Steve Clifton in 1995. Banke received Wine Spectator's Distinguished Service Award in 2017 for her work with Jackson Family Winery.

Jackson Family Wines sponsored the Homes for Sonoma project in 2018 after the October 2017 Northern California wildfires.

In 2020, Jackson Family Wines announced the acquisiton of Giant Steps winery in Australia's Yarra Valley, comprising approx. 75 acres of vineyards including the Sexton and Applejack vineyards that have produced some of Australia's most highly-ranked Pinot Noir.

== Regenerative farming ==
The company has set a goal to transition 100% of their estate vineyards to regenerative farming by 2030. To reduce pesticides, Jackson Family Wines has owls and falcons to attack pests. Drones are used to detect moisture in crops as well as nutritional deficiencies and irrigation leaks. Pressed grapes are composted and returned to the soil to help it retain moisture. In response to growing drought, Jackson Family Wines started planting vines that have deeper root and require less irrigation. Jackson Family Wines runs PVC piping directed to a reservoir on Green Valley Creek and release water into it to keep the environment healthy for the endangered coho salmon.
