= Charles Krug Winery =

- U.S. National Register of Historic Places
- California Historical Landmark
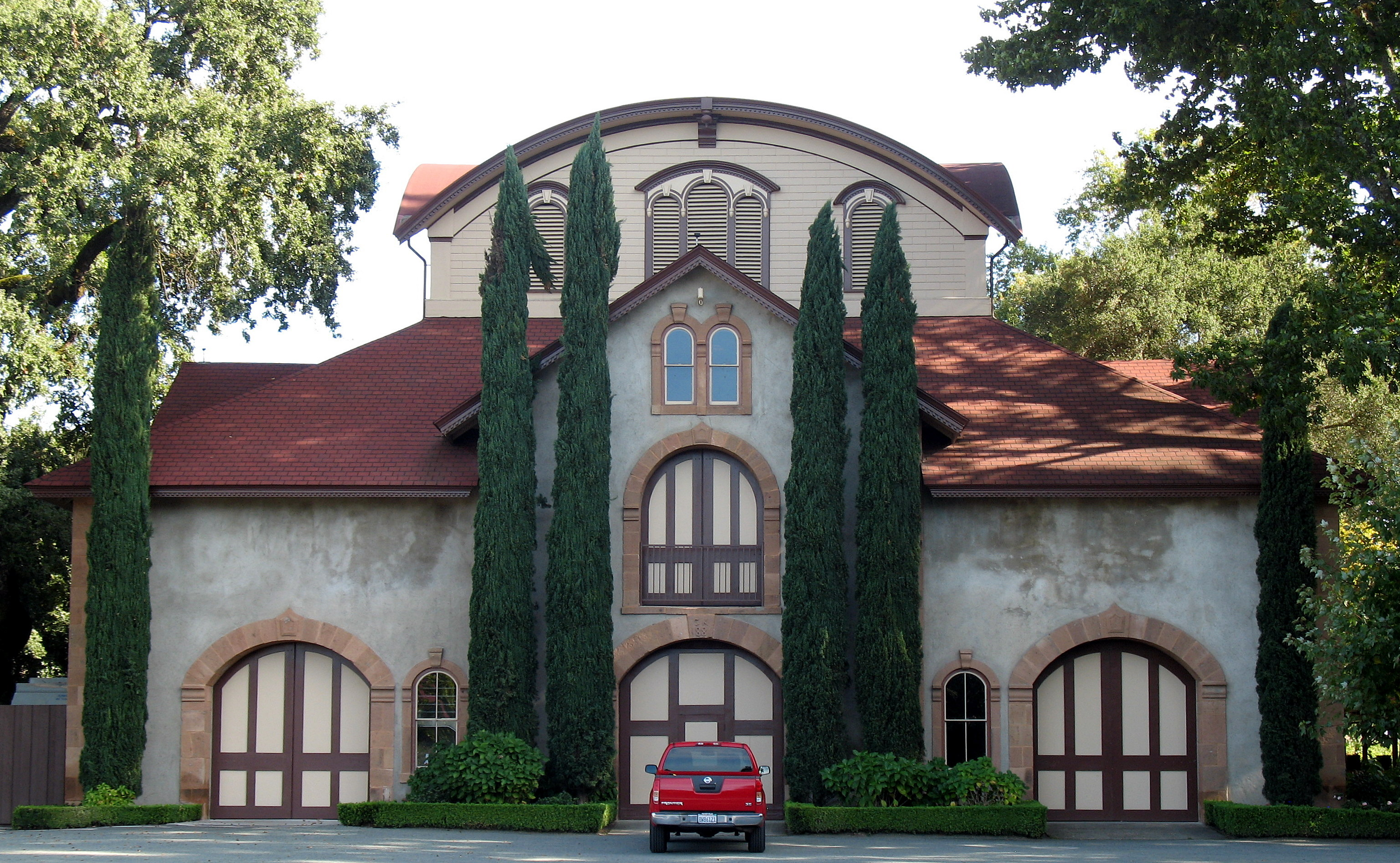

- Location within California Location within the United States
- Location: St. Helena Hwy., St. Helena, California
- Coordinates: 38°31′3″N 122°28′49″W
- Area: 8 acres (3.2 ha)
- Built: 1881
- NRHP reference No.: 74000542
- CHISL No.: 563

Significant dates
- Added to NRHP: November 8, 1974
- Designated CHISL: December 31, 1956

The Charles Krug Winery is a winery founded by Charles Krug in 1861. It was named to the National Register of Historic Places on November 8, 1974.

== History ==
Historically, Charles Krug introduced innovative ideas in California winemaking. He began making wine using a cider press for pressing, carefully selected rootstocks, varietals and vineyard sites. The knowledge he gained and shared benefited the young California wine industry. Following Krug's death, James Moffitt Sr. purchased the winery in 1894. In 1943, Robert Mondavi persuaded his parents, Cesare and Rosa Mondavi, to purchase the inactive winery from Moffitt for $75,000.

== Present status ==
The winery remains owned by the family of Peter Mondavi, Robert's brother.
