= List of celebrities who own wineries and vineyards =

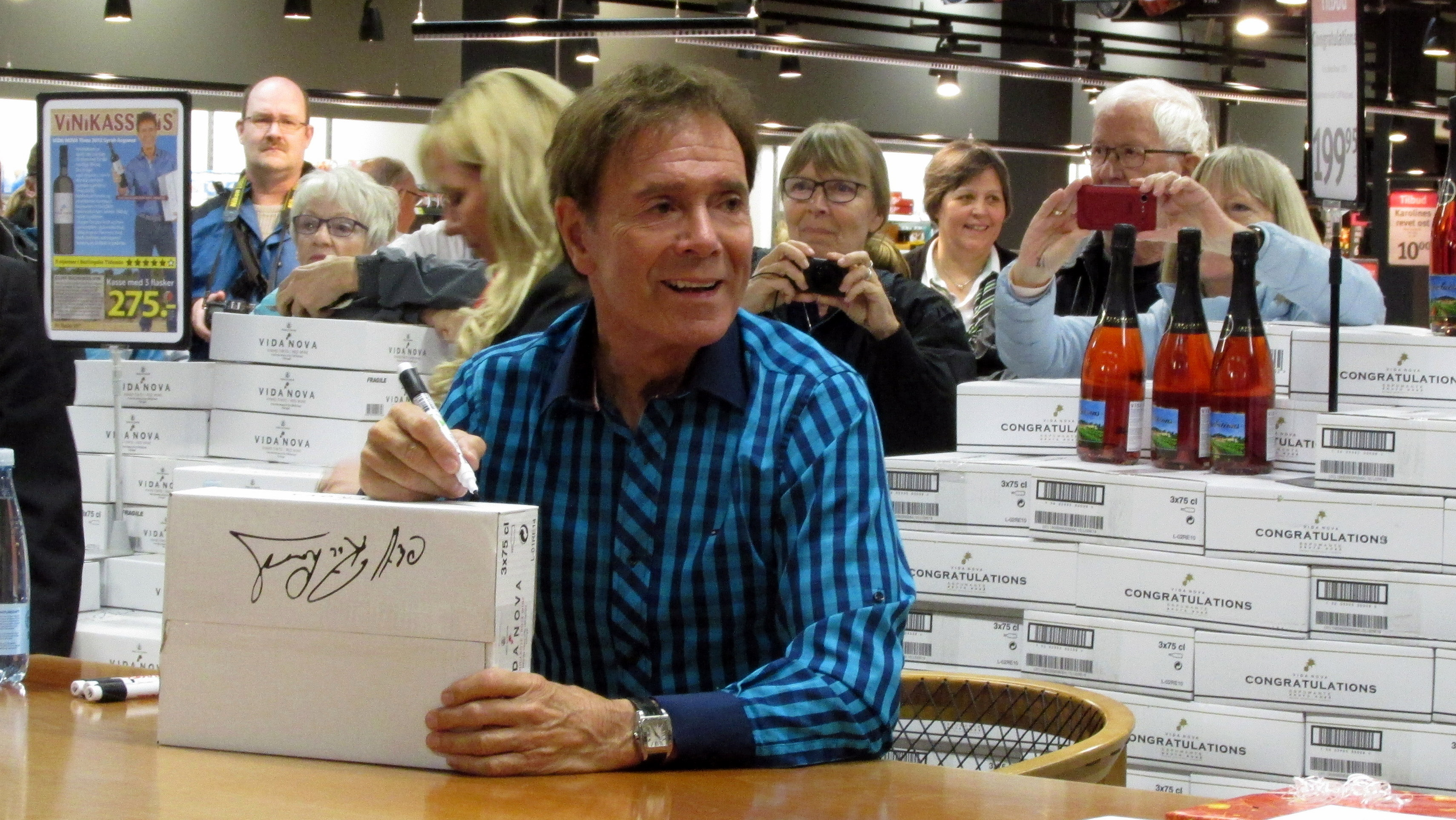
Cliff Richard promotes his wine in Denmark, 2015.

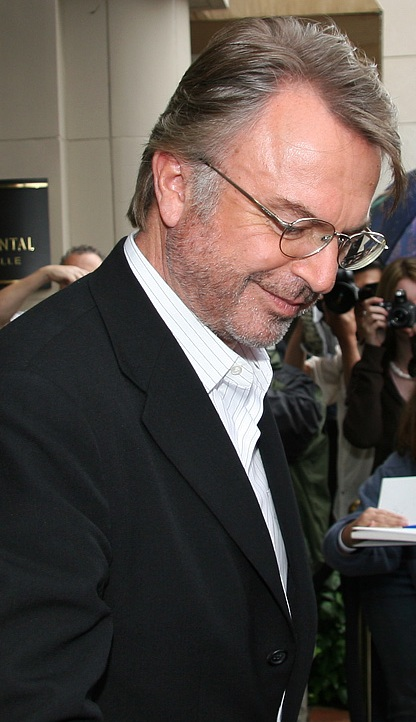
New Zealand actor Sam Neill owned a winery in the Central Otago region of New Zealand.

The trend of celebrities owning wineries and vineyards is not a recent phenomenon, though it has certainly garnered more attention in today's Information Age. In ancient Greek and Roman times, the leading philosophers, playwrights, politicians and generals of the day often owned vineyards for personal use. Usually celebrities have a large amount of wealth accumulated, which makes the significant investment of opening a winery or vineyard negligible.

There are many reasons that celebrities gravitate to the world of wine. Starting a winery or vineyard, as with nearly any business, can offer some tax benefits. Some celebrities, such as the Italian-American director Francis Ford Coppola, come from a family with a long history of winemaking. Some, such as the British singer Cliff Richard, have been lifelong wine enthusiasts and enter the wine industry in order to do something that they enjoy. Others like the challenge of a new enterprise. Some celebrities enter the wine industry simply because they can.

While some celebrities, such as the American actors Brad Pitt, Angelina Jolie, Johnny Depp, British association football star David Beckham and his wife Victoria Beckham, own vineyards and wine estates solely for personal use, some celebrities leverage their name recognition as a selling tool in the wine industry. Today celebrity-owned wineries can be lucrative business endeavors. In 2007, Nielsen research of supermarket wine purchases showed that sales of celebrity wines were up 19% over previous years.

== Types of celebrity involvement ==
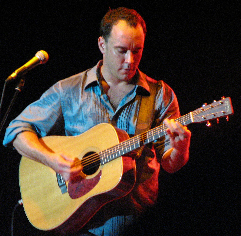
American musician Dave Matthews owns a winery in Virginia.

Celebrities have different degrees of involvement in their wineries and vineyards. Nearly all of them partner, in some form of collaboration, with a winery or winemaker who is already established in the industry. An example of this is retired American football player Joe Montana, who partnered with longtime Beringer winemaker Ed Sbragia to make their joint venture wine Montagia. While Sbragia oversees most of the viticultural and winemaking tasks, Montana is involved in deciding on the overall "vision" of the wine and participates in tasting and blending trials.

Similarly, the celebrity may own their own "wine brand" that is produced with their collaborating winery instead of owning a physical winery or wine estate itself. An example of this is the brand Mike Ditka Wines, owned by former American football coach Mike Ditka. The wine is produced in partnership at the physical winemaking facilities of the Mendocino Wine Company. While it could be described as a "winery", technically Mike Ditka Wines is a "wine brand" owned by Ditka, who participates in blending and tasting trials. Other celebrities, such as French actor Gérard Depardieu, are very active in both the production and business dealings of the winery. Depardieu, who owns wineries in several countries across the globe, even has his passport listing his occupation as vigneron.

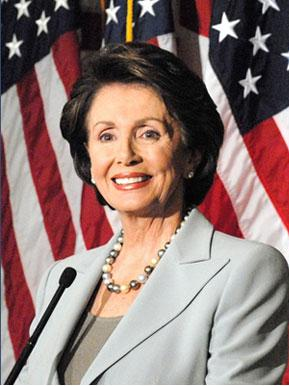
Former Speaker of the United States House of Representatives Nancy Pelosi owns two vineyards that sell grapes to California producers.

Some celebrities may only have "legacy" attachments to the wines that bear their names. One example is the Gallo wine brand MacMurray Ranch, which uses some grapes grown on a California ranch that was once owned by the American actor Fred MacMurray. Under his ownership, the ranch was dedicated mostly to raising horses. After MacMurray died, his family sold most of the land to the Gallo family, but are still involved with the winery.

Another "legacy" celebrity was the American actor Raymond Burr. Burr bought the ranch with his domestic partner and planted grapevines for wine production before he died in 1993. His partner, Robert Benevides, renamed the estate after Burr and continued making wines featuring his name.

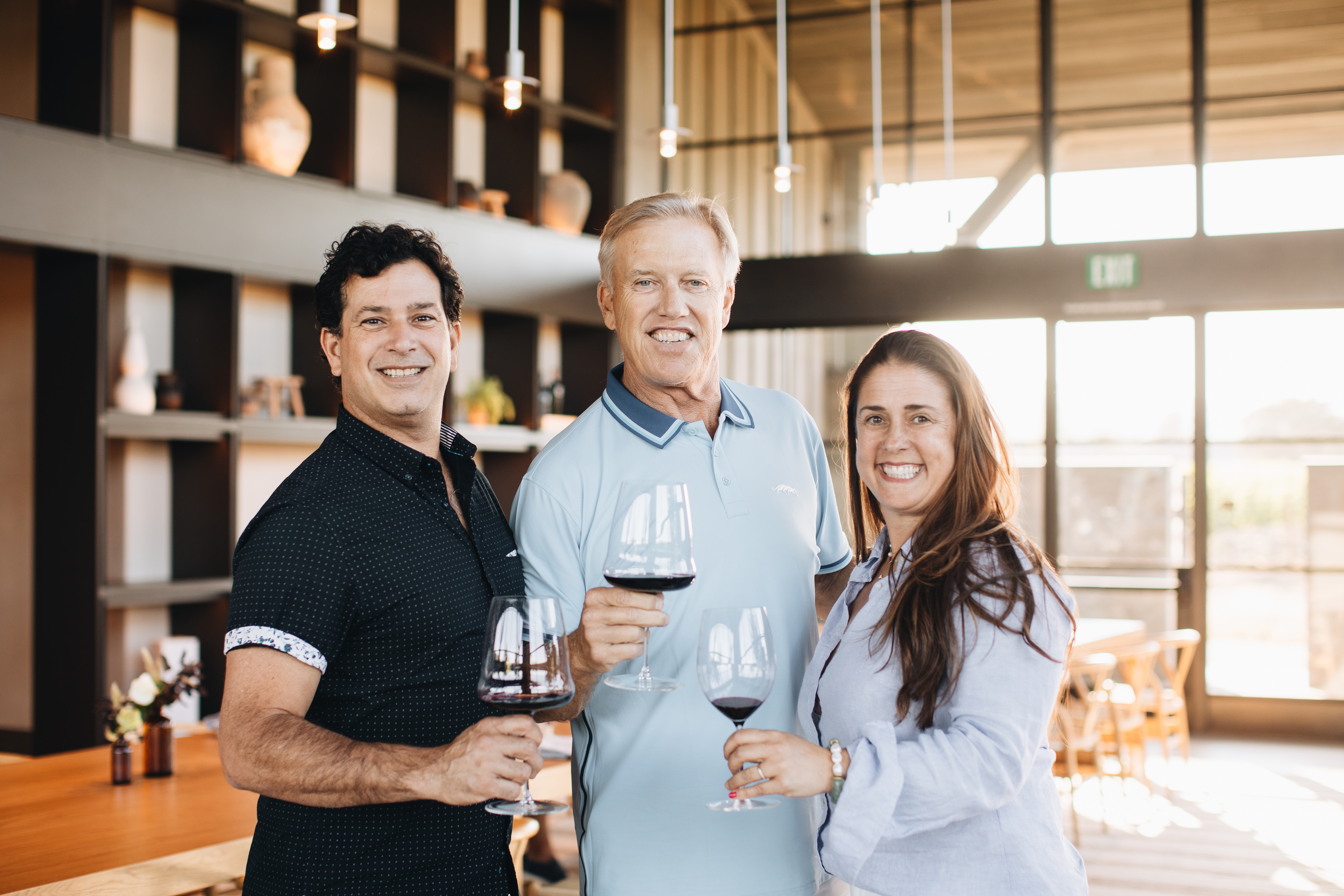
John Elway with winemakers Rob Mondavi Jr and Mari Coyle

Some celebrities lend their names to a winery for a special one-time wine production. Mexican-American musician Carlos Santana partnered with the Champagne house G.H. Mumm to create a sparkling wine in 2005 titled Santana DVX. While Santana helped select the final blend and received royalties for the use of his name and image, he does not own the brand nor does he continue to be involved in the wine industry.

American musician Bob Dylan participated in a similar arrangement with the Italian winery Fattoria Le Terrazze. Dylan gave permission for the winery to use his name, likeness and album art to create a wine that pays tribute to his 1974 album Planet Waves. In 2007, American entrepreneur Martha Stewart announced a collaboration with the American winery Gallo to produce value-marketed wines to be sold at Kmart, which also featured her Martha Stewart Living line of housewares. In 2009, British chef Gordon Ramsay allowed a Bordeaux winery to use his name, without royalties, to celebrate the release of their 10th vintage.

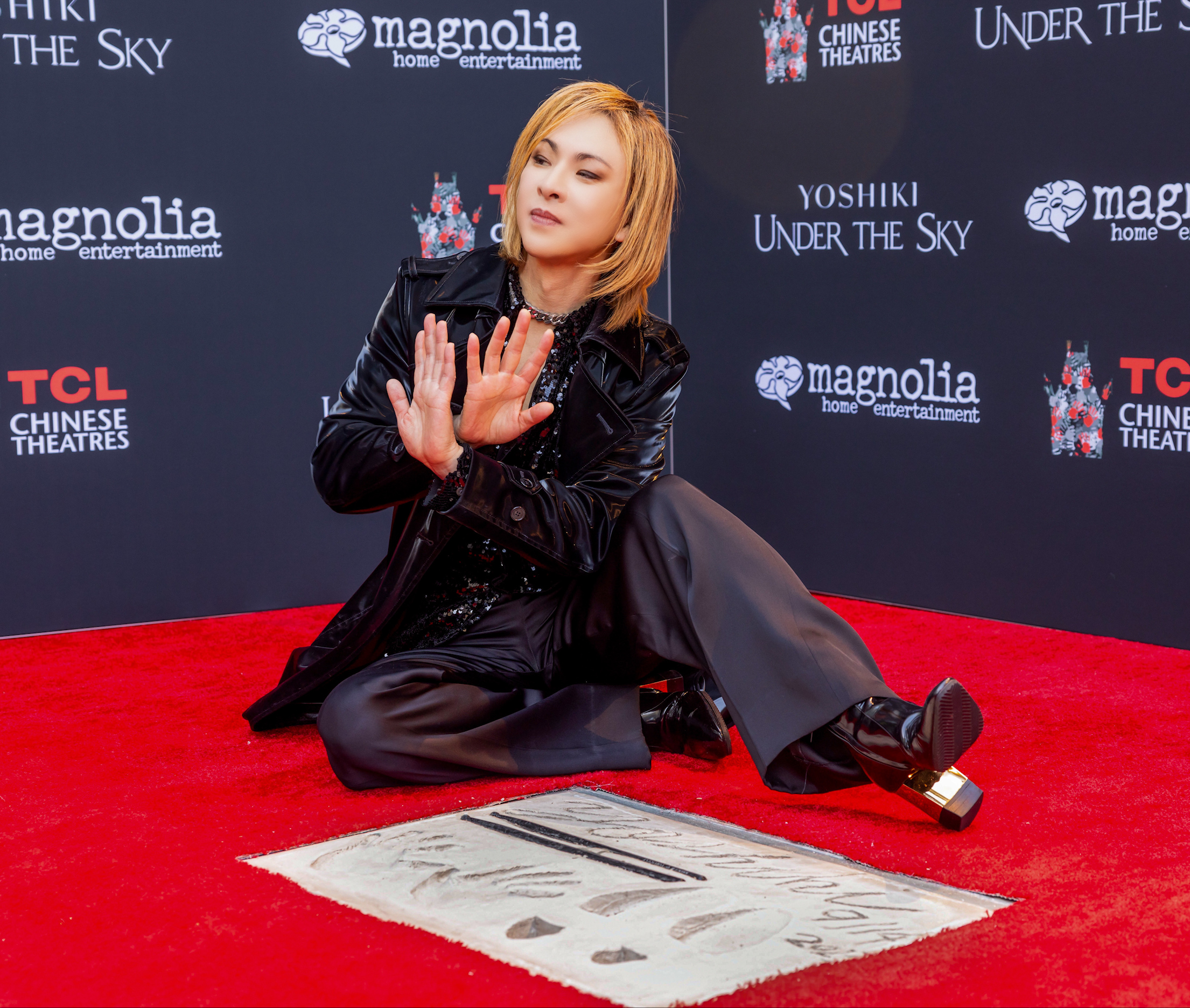
Japanese musician Yoshiki launched his Y by Yoshiki wine in 2009.

In 2009, Japanese musician Yoshiki launched his wine brand "Y by Yoshiki" with California winemaker Michael Mondavi, including varietals Cabernet Sauvignon, Pinot Noir, Chardonnay, and Rosé. The brand, which is served in premium hotels and restaurants, has continually sold out across Japan and is referred to as a "phantom wine" due to its scarcity.

== List of celebrities ==
Below is a partial listing of celebrities who own commercial wineries, wine brands or vineyards. This is not a listing of celebrities who only own vineyards for private use.

Celebrity	Winery/vineyard	Location	Notes	Reference
Dan Abrams	Ev&Em Vineyards	Laurel, New York	Purchased existing vineyard, renovated and renamed Ev&Em in 2021	
Stephen Amell	Nocking Point Wines	Walla Walla Valley, Washington	Columbia Valley wines; co-owned with Walla Walla native Andrew Harding	
Mario Andretti	Andretti Winery	Napa Valley, California	Founded winery with Joe Antonini, CEO of sponsor Kmart during final eight years of CART career (1987–94)	
Francisco J. Ayala		Central Valley, California	The renowned biology professor grows Perot Lego, Petite Sirah, Touriga Nacional, Pinot Noir and other varieties for local wineries.	
Dan Aykroyd	Dan Aykroyd Wines	Niagara Peninsula, Ontario, Canada	Collaboration with Diamond Estates Wines & Spirits in Autumn 2008	
Ross Bagdasarian	Sierra Wine Corp.	Vallecito, Placer County, California		
Dusty Baker	Baker Family Wines	Granite Bay, Placer County, California	Started in 2013 with winemaker & managing partner Chik Brenneman	
Antonio Banderas	Anta Banderas	Ribera del Duero, Spain	Banderas acquired 50% shareholding of Bodega Anta Natura, located in the town of Burgos Villalba de Duero	
Elizabeth Banks	Archer Roose	Veneto and Friuli-Venezia Giulia, Italy; Provence, France; Casablanca Valley, Chile; Mendoza, Argentina	Co-owner	
Drew Barrymore	Carmel Road	Monterey County, California	In partnership with Carmel Road Winery	
Lidia Bastianich	Bastianich Winery	Friuli-Venezia Giulia, Italy	Collaboration with son and Italian restaurateur and author Joe Bastianich	
Mario Batali	La Mozza	Magliano in Toscana, Italy	Collaboration with Italian winemaker and author Joe Bastianich	
Gérard Bertrand	Gérard Bertrand Estates	Languedoc-Roussillon, France	Former rugby union player representing France and renown winemaker	
Drew Bledsoe	Doubleback Wine	Walla Walla Valley, Washington	Originally collaborated with Washington winemaker Chris Figgins of Leonetti Cellars. Since the 2015 vintage, Bledsoe has collaborated with Figgins' protege Josh McDaniels.	
Mary J. Blige	Sun Goddess	Friuli-Venezia Giulia, Italy	Collaboration with the renowned Fantinel Winery.	
Jon Bon Jovi	Hampton Water Wine Co	Languedoc-Roussillon, France	Bon Jovi and his son Jesse, partnered with winemaker Gérard Bertrand.	
Carole Bouquet	Maison Carole Bouquet	Pantelleria, Italy		
Lorraine Bracco	Bracco Wines	Tuscany, Italy	Produces wines from several Italian wine regions	
Kix Brooks	Arrington Vineyards	Arrington, Tennessee	Former 95-acre cattle ranch converted to winery with 16-acre vineyard open to the public	
Kevin Buckler	Adobe Road Winery	Petaluma, California	Opened in 2002	
Galvão Bueno	Bueno Wines	Candiota, Rio Grande do Sul, Brazil; Montalcino, Italy		
Valeri Bure	Chateau Boswell Winery	St. Helena, California	Operates Bure Family Wines with his wife, actress Candace Cameron	
Raymond Burr	Raymond Burr Vineyards	Dry Creek Valley, California	Established by actor in 1986 and left to his partner, Robert Benevides. The vineyard was closed and sold in 2018, but since reopened.	
Jonathan Cain	Finale Wines	Sonoma Coast, Russian River Valley and Napa Valley, California	Collaboration with California winemaker Dennis De La Montanya. Cain family has a winemaking history as his grandfather made wine after arriving in Arkansas from Czechoslovakia in 1920.	
Brandi Carlile	XOBC Cellars	Walla Walla Valley, Washington	Partnership with her wife Catherine and their friends, Jeri and Amy Andrews.	
Al Bano Carrisi	Al Bano Carrisi Winery	Cellino San Marco, Puglia, Italy		
Gerald Casale	The 50 by 50	Napa Valley & Sonoma Coast, California	Centerpiece of the estate is both eight acres of the Bordeaux grapes, and the meticulous resurrection of 20th Century Modernist architect, Ludwig Mies Van Der Rohe's 50 by 50 House designed over 60 years ago.	
Richard Childress	Childress Vineyards	Lexington, North Carolina		
Les Claypool	Claypool Cellars	Russian River Valley, California		
Bruce Cohn	B.R. Cohn Winery	Glen Ellen, California	Cohn was manager of The Doobie Brothers.	
Francis Ford Coppola	Rubicon Estate Winery	Napa Valley, California	Renamed Inglenook in 2011	
Gérard Depardieu	Chateau de Tigne	Anjou, Loire Valley, France	Also owns vineyards in Bordeaux, Languedoc, Algeria, Argentina, Morocco, Spain, Sicily and the United States	
Cameron Diaz	Avaline	France, Spain	Partnered with Katherine Power	
Mike Ditka	Mike Ditka Wines	Mendocino County, California	Collaboration with the Mendocino Wine Company	
Snoop Dogg	19 Crimes	Australia, Lodi, California	A multiyear partnership with Australian wine brand	
Dave Del Dotto	Del Dotto Vineyards	Napa Valley, California	In 2007, experimented with fermenting wine in amphorae	
E-40	Earl Stevens Selections	Central Valley, California		
Ernie Els	Ernie Els Wines	Stellenbosch, South Africa	Collaboration with award-winning winemaker Louis Strydom.	
John Elway	7Cellars	Napa Valley, California	Founded in 2015 by with winemaker Robert Mondavi Jr.	
Emilio Estevez	Casa Dumetz	Santa Ynez Valley, California		
Nick Faldo	Nick Faldo Wines	Coonawarra, Australia	Collaboration with Katnook Estate	
Guy Fieri	Hunt & Ryde Winery	Sonoma County, California	Named after sons, Hunter and Ryder. Partnership with winemaker Guy Davis	
Elías Figueroa	Vinos Don Elías	Maipo Valley, Chile	First celebrity-owned winery in Chile & South America, established 1999	
Mick Fleetwood	Mick Fleetwood Private Cellar	Sta. Rita Hills, Santa Barbara County, California	Collaboration with Langtry Estate and Vineyards	
Peggy Fleming	Fleming Jenkins Vineyards and Winery	Santa Cruz Mountains, California	Founded with her husband, Greg Jenkins. The winery ceased production in January 2012 and the business closed.	
Fergie (Stacy) Ferguson	Ferguson Crest	Santa Ynez Valley, California	Founded with her father in 2006.	
David Ginola	Coste Brulade	Côtes de Provence, France	In partnership with the Coste Brulade co-op at Puget-Ville	
Jeff Gordon	Jeff Gordon Wines	Napa Valley, California	Collaboration with August Briggs Wines	
Wayne Gretzky	Wayne Gretzky Estates	Niagara Peninsula, Ontario and Okanagan Valley, British Columbia, Canada	Collaboration with Peller Estates Winery	
Terry Hoage	TH Estate Wines	Paso Robles, California	University of Georgia and former NFL player, winemaker, viticulturist and winery proprietor.	
Adam Housley	Century Oak Winery & Housley Winery	Napa Valley AVA and Lodi (Mokulmne River AVA), California	Established by the Housley family in 2000 and added Housley Napa Valley in 2019 along with wife Actress Tamera Mowry-Housley. The winery has garnered more than 300 medals.	
Mick Hucknall	Il Cantante	Sicily, Italy	Collaboration with Italian winemaker Salvo Foti	
Andrés Iniesta	Bodega Iniesta	Fuentealbilla, Spain		
Günther Jauch	Weingut von Othegraven	Kanzem, Germany	Vineyard a listed cultural heritage site	
Robert Mark Kamen	Kamen Estate Wines	Sonoma County, California	Phil Coturri, viticulturist; Mark Herold, winemaker	
Maynard James Keenan	Caduceus Cellars	Verde Valley, Arizona	Also owns Merkin Vineyards in Arizona	
John Lasseter	Lasseter Family Winery	Sonoma County, California		
John Legend	LVE Wines	St. Helena, California	Partnership with owner Jean-Charles Boisset of Napa-based Raymond Vineyards and the JCB Winery collection. Raymond Vineyards also owns wineries in France	
Randy Lewis	Lewis Cellars	Napa Valley, California	Family winery established in 1992.	
Lil Jon	Little Jonathan Winery	Paso Robles, California	Collaboration with California winemaker Alison Crowe	
Jack London, Estate of	Jack London Winery	Glen Ellen, California	Shepard family, descendants of London's half-sister Eliza Shepard. Since 1976, Kenwood Vineyards has been the exclusive producer of wines from the historic single vineyards of the famous Jack London Ranch.	
Kevin Love	Chosen Family Vineyards	Carlton, Oregon in Willamette Valley	Founded by NBA Champion Channing Frye in partnership with former NBA Championship teammate and current Miami Heat star Kevin Love, Jacob Gray and noted Winemaker Chase Renton.	
George Lucas	Skywalker Vineyards	Lucas Valley, California	The vineyards are located at Lucas's Skywalker Ranch in the North Coast AVA.	
Nigel Lythgoe	Villa San-Juliette	Paso Robles, California	Co-owner with Ken Warwick	
Kyle MacLachlan	Pursued by Bear Wine	Columbia Valley, Washington	Collaboration with Washington winemaker Eric Dunham	
Fred MacMurray	MacMurray Estate Vineyards	Russian River Valley and Central Valley, California	An E & J Gallo property, but maintained by daughter Kate MacMurray with winemaker Boyd Morrison	
Post Malone	Maison No. 9	Provence, France	Launched in 2020 collaborating with winemaker Alexis Cornu and E. & J. Gallo Winery	
Dan Marino	Vintage 13 Marino Estates	Sonoma County, California		
Dave Matthews	Blenheim Vineyards	Charlottesville, Virginia		
CJ McCollum	McCollum Family Vineyards	Willamette Valley, Oregon	McCollum and his wife, Elise, after five years in the making, launched their inaugural wine collection in 2026.	
Luis Miguel	Viña Ventisquero Unico	Maipo Valley, Chile	Collaboration with Chilean winemaker Aurelio Montes Del Campo	
Ron W. and Diane Miller	Silverado Vineyards Winery	Napa Valley, California	Owned by Ron Miller, who was married to Walt Disney's daughter until her death in 2013, and their children.	
Nicki Minaj	Myx Fusions	Australia, Spain, Italy, Argentina and United States	Collaboration with Myx Fusions winery	
Kylie Minogue	Kylie Minogue Wines	Gambellara, Italy		
Rick Mirer	Mirror Napa Valley	Napa Valley, California	Kirk Venge winemaker	
Joe Montana	Montagia Wines	Napa Valley, California	Collaboration with Ed Sbragia, former winemaker of Beringer Wines	
Mickey Morandini	Second Base Wines	Cooperstown, New York	Collaboratrion with Pat Burrell	
Dave Mustaine	Mustaine Vineyards	Temecula Valley, California		
Jim Nantz	The Calling	Sonoma County, California	Collaboration with winemaker Peter Deutsch, CEO of Deutsch Family Wine & Spirits	
Vince Neil	Vince Neil Vineyards	Sonoma County, California		
Sam Neill	Two Paddocks	Central Otago, South Island, New Zealand		
Olivia Newton-John	Koala Blue Wines	Melbourne, Australia	Founded in 1983 with business partner Pat Farrar	
Greg Norman	Greg Norman Estates	South Australia, New Zealand, Napa Valley, Paso Robles and Santa Barbara County, California	Collaboration with Beringer Blass	
Graham Norton	Invivo Wines	Marlborough and Central Otago, New Zealand	Graham Norton's Own Sauvignon Blanc, collaboration with Invivo Wines in 2014 and 2015	
Terrell Owens	Eighty One	Paso Robles, California	Collaboration with Lasorda Family Wines	
Arnold Palmer	Arnold Palmer Wines	Napa Valley, California	Collaboration with Luna Vineyards	
Jacques Parizeau	Coteau de l'Élisette	Languedoc, France		
Fess Parker	Fess Parker Winery	Santa Ynez Valley, California	Was featured in the 2004 film Sideways	
Robert M. Parker, Jr.	Beaux Frères Vineyards & Winery	Willamette Valley, Oregon	Co-owns winery with brother in law. To avoid a conflict of interest with his wine rating publication The Wine Advocate, Parker delegates the task of rating Oregon wines to another associate.	
Sarah Jessica Parker	Invivo X, SJP	New Zealand	Parker collaborated with New Zealand producer Invivo winery	
Nancy Pelosi	Zinfandel Lane Vineyard	St. Helena, California	Also owns Skellenger Lane Vineyard in Napa Valley. Pelosi sells her grapes to other California winemakers instead of producing her own wine.	
Pink	Two Wolves Wine	Santa Ynez Valley, California		
Andrea Pirlo	Pratum Coller Vineyard	Brescia, Italy	Vineyard purchased in 2007 in his father's hometown. Produces Merlot amongst others. Family historically owned vineyards in the same area.	
Brad Pitt and Angelina Jolie	Chateau Miraval	Provence, France	Bought winemaking estate in 2012. Consult with Marc Perrin. In 2021, Jolie sold her half of the estate to Tenute del Mondo, the wine division the Stoli Group.	
Carmen Policy	Casa Piena	Yountville, California		
Jason Priestley	Black Hills Estate Winery	Okanagan Valley, British Columbia, Canada	The British Columbia born actor is a co-owner in the estate	
Cliff Richard	Adega do Cantor	Algarve, Portugal	Collaboration with Quinta do Miradouro	
Lisa Rinna	Rinna Wines	South West France	partnership with Prestige Beverage Group	
Ronaldo	Cepa 21	Ribera del Duero, Spain		
Kurt Russell and Goldie Hawn	Gogi Wines	Sta. Rita Hills, Santa Barbara County, California		
Savanna Samson	Savanna Samson Wines	Tuscany and Lazio, Italy	Her first wine Sogno Uno is a red blend consisting mainly of the obscure Italian grape variety Cesanese.	
Boz Scaggs	Scaggs Vineyard	Mt. Veeder, California	Growing Grenache, Mourvedre, Syrah & Counoise varietals on the northern crest of Mt Veeder.	
Cathy Schembechler	Bo Schembechler Wines	Monterey County, California	Named after her late husband, former University of Michigan American football coach Bo Schembechler	
Nicole Scherzinger	Nocking Point Wines	Walla Walla Valley, Washington	collaboration with Nocking Point Wines	
Brian Schmidt	Maipenrai Vineyard and Winery	Canberra District, New South Wales, Australia	Owns and operates the winery with his wife. Nobel Prize winner and vice-chancellor of the Australian National University.	
Tom Seaver	Seaver Vineyards	Diamond Mountain, California		
Michael Seresin	Seresin Estate	Marlborough New Zealand		
Alan Silvestri	Silvestri Vineyards	Carmel Valley, California		
Ramona Singer	Ramona Singer	Veneto and Tuscany, Italy	Pinot Grigio, Merlot-Sangiovese produced by Opici Wines	
Tommy Smothers	Remick Ridge Vineyards	Sonoma Mountain, California		
Alex Spanos	Bell Wine Cellars	Yountville, California	Bought Bell Wine Cellars in Yountville to form Spanos Berberian Winery LLC and partnership with winemaker Anthony Bell.	
Sting	Tenuta il Palagio	Tuscany, Italy		
Train	Save Me, San Francisco Wine Co.	Livermore Valley, California	Collaboration with Concannon Vineyard. Named after the band's fifth album.	
Jarno Trulli	Podere Castorani	Abruzzo, Italy		
Donald and Eric Trump	Trump Winery	Charlottesville, Virginia	Purchased by Donald Trump, but owned & operated by son, Eric Trump, Kerry Woolard as G.M., and Jonathan Wheeler, winemaker	
Jimmy Vasser	V12 Vineyards	Napa Valley, California		
Dick Vermeil	Vermeil Wines	Napa Valley & Sonoma County, California	Collaboration with Paul Smith of OnThEdge Winery.	
Dwyane Wade	Wade Cellars	Napa & Sonoma Valley, California	Co-founded by Wade and Jamie Watson in partnership with the iconic Pahlmeyer winemaker family,	
Eric Wareheim	Las Jaras Wines	Mendocino and Sonoma Mountain, California	Collaboration with winemaker Joel Burt.	
Mark Warner	Ingleside Vineyards	Northern Neck George Washington Birthplace, Virginia	Grows grapes and makes privates label with Ingleside's owners and winemaker	
Mike Weir	Mike Weir Wine	Niagara Peninsula, Ontario, Canada	Collaboration with broadcaster Bob McCown. Winery was closed in 2019 and placed into receivership due to court battle between Weir and McCown.	
Sigurd Wongraven	Luca Roagna	Piemonte, Italy	The front figure of black-metal band Satyricon has also launched other brands including an organic Champagne cuvée produced by Baron-Fuenté.	
Charles Woodson	Charles Woodson and Intercept Wines	Calistoga, Paso Robles and Monterey Valley, California		
Hansjörg Wyss	Halter Ranch and Vineyard	Paso Robles & Temecula Valley, California	Ranch includes an 1,800-acre wildlife preserve and a 281-acre vineyard producing 13 varietals of grapes using methods that are "Sustainability in Practice" certified.	
Yao Ming	Yao Family Wines	Napa Valley, California	Established in November 2011 with industry leader Tim Hinde.	
Yoshiki	Y by Yoshiki	Napa Valley, California	Established in 2009 in collaboration with California winemaker Michael Mondavi, including varietals Cabernet Sauvignon, Pinot Noir, Chardonnay, and Rosé.	
Måns Zelmerlöw	MZ Wines	Catalonia, Spain		

== See also ==
- List of wine professionals
