= Andretti Winery =

- Location: Napa, California, USA
- Appellation: Napa Valley AVA
- Founded: 1996
- First vintage: 1996
- Key people: Mario Andretti, Founder; Joe Antonini, Founder and CEO
- Parent company: Andretti Wine Group
- Cases/yr: 42,000 (2007)
- Known for: Cabernet Sauvignon Andretti Reserve
- Varietals: Cabernet Sauvignon, Syrah, Sauvignon blanc, Merlot, Chardonnay, Sangiovese, Pinot grigio, Pinot noir
- Other products: Port, Sparkling Wine, Memorabilia
- Distribution: international distribution, wine club, on-site sales
- Tasting: by appointment
- Website: http://www.andrettiwinery.com/

Andretti Winery is a boutique winery in the Oak Knoll District of Napa, California.

== History ==
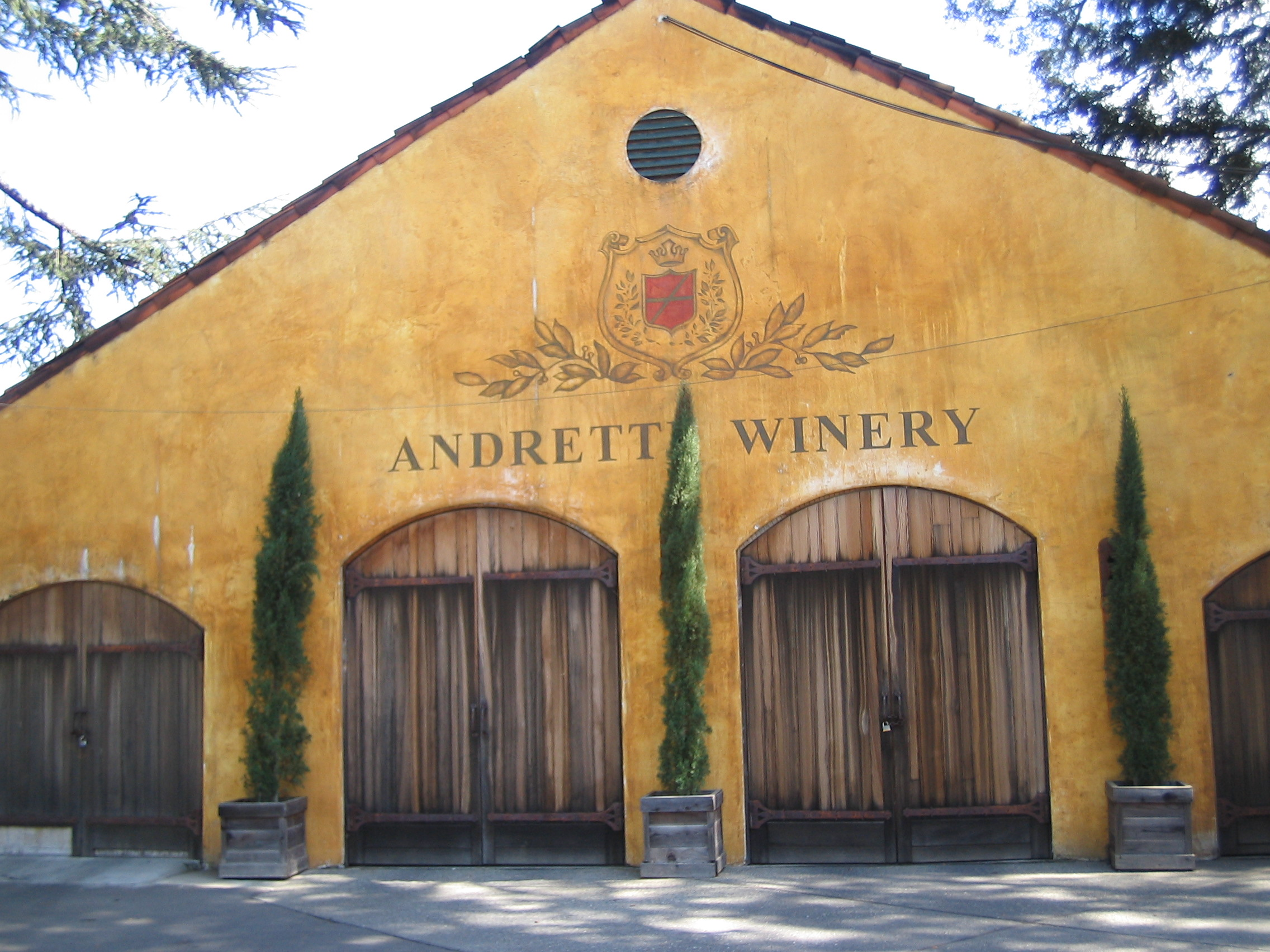
Andretti Winery

Racing driver Mario Andretti's interest in the wine business arose from a commemorative bottling of wine he marketed to celebrate his retirement from auto racing in 1994. Two years later Andretti and longtime friend Joe Antonini, former CEO of Kmart (which had sponsored Andretti's racing team) purchased a 53-acre (210,000 m^{2}) vineyard and winery in the far north part of Napa, California, where they built a Tuscan-themed winery, tasting room, and guesthouse. The property was under development as a winery at the time, with wine under production by the former owners.

In 2001 the company sold the land to a Napa farming group. The winery then leased back the tasting room and events center. The company has no ownership stake in the nearby vineyards.

The winery is operated by a public company, Andretti Wine Group, that the founders formed in a reverse public shell merger in 1995. It raised $3 million via a public offering in 1998, but is no longer publicly traded.

In 2021, the winery on Big Ranch Road closed and announced plans to open at a different location.

== Wines ==
Bob Pepi, co-founder of Pepi Winery and owner of the "Eponymous" winery, has been winemaker since the winery opened in 1996. The winery produces a wide variety of "super-premium" wines from grapes grown on-site and sourced from various locations in California. It also resells a small quantity of wine imported from Italy.

== See also ==
- List of celebrities who own wineries and vineyards
