= Remick Ridge Vineyards =

California vineyard and winery

Coordinates: 38.57796°N 122.98883°W

Remick Ridge Vineyards is a California-based vineyard and winery owned and operated by the Smothers Brothers. It is a monopole vineyard for Arrowood Vineyards and Winery in the Sonoma Valley. The setting of this viticulture operation is on a ridge of the northern Sonoma Mountains above Sonoma Creek. The name Remick is the maiden name of the brothers' mother and their grandfather, Ed Remick, who lived on the property for 15 years with Tommy. It was established in 1977.

== See also ==
- Sonoma Mountain
- Wine Country
- List of celebrities who own wineries and vineyards
