= Valeri Bure =

Russian ice hockey player (born 1974)

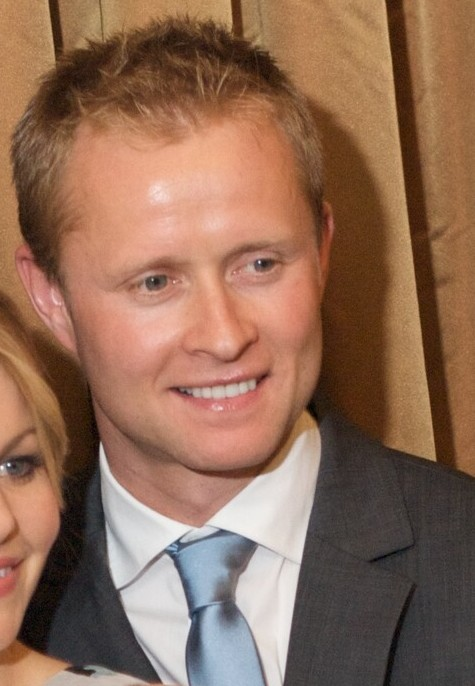
- Bure in 2010
- Born: June 13, 1974 (age 52) Moscow, Soviet Union
- Height: 5 ft 10 in (178 cm)
- Weight: 181 lb (82 kg; 12 st 13 lb)
- Position: Right wing
- Shot: Right
- Played for: CSKA Moscow; Montreal Canadiens; Calgary Flames; Florida Panthers; St. Louis Blues; Dallas Stars
- National team: Russia
- NHL draft: 33rd overall, 1992; Montreal Canadiens
- Playing career: 1990–2004
Medal record
Ice hockey
Representing Russia
Winter Olympics
Silver medal – second place	1998 Nagano
Bronze medal – third place	2002 Salt Lake City
World Junior Championships
Bronze medal – third place	1994 Czech Republic

Valeri Vladimirovich Bure (/ˈvɑːləri bʊˈreɪ/ VAH-lə-ree buu-RAY; Russian: Валерий Владимирович Буре, IPA: [vɐˈlʲerʲɪj bʊˈrɛ]; born June 13, 1974) is a Russian-American former professional ice hockey player. He was a right winger for 10 seasons in the National Hockey League (NHL) for the Montreal Canadiens, Calgary Flames, Florida Panthers, St. Louis Blues, and Dallas Stars from 1995 to 2004. A second-round selection of the Canadiens, 33rd overall, at the 1992 NHL entry draft, Bure appeared in one NHL All-Star Game, in 2000. He led the Flames in scoring with 35 goals and 75 points in 1999–2000, a season in which he and brother Pavel combined to set an NHL record for goals by a pair of siblings with 93.

Bure left his home in the Soviet Union in 1991 to play junior ice hockey in the Western Hockey League (WHL) for the Spokane Chiefs. A two-time WHL all-star, he was the first Russian player in the league's history. Internationally, he represented Russia on numerous occasions. He was a member of the bronze medal-winning squad at the 1994 World Junior Championship and was a two-time medalist at the Winter Olympics. Bure and the Russians won the silver medal in 1998 and bronze in 2002.

Back and hip injuries led to Bure's retirement from hockey in 2005. He now operates Bure Family Wines in St. Helena, California with his wife, actress Candace Cameron Bure, to whom he has been married since 1996.

== Early life ==
Valeri Bure was born June 13, 1974, in Moscow, Soviet Union. He is the younger son of Vladimir and Tatiana Bure. Vladimir, whose family originated from Furna, Switzerland, was an Olympic swimmer who won four medals for the Soviet Union at three Olympic Games between 1968 and 1976. Bure's family had a noble history: his ancestors made precious watches for Russian tsars from 1815 to 1917 and as craftsmen of the imperial family, were granted noble status.

Bure was around nine years old when his parents separated. In 1991, he joined his father and brother, Pavel, in moving to North America as his elder sibling embarked on a National Hockey League (NHL) career with the Vancouver Canucks. His mother arrived two months later. They settled initially in Los Angeles where Vladimir continued to train and coach both Valeri and Pavel in hockey and physical conditioning. However, by 1998 both became estranged from their father, along with his second wife and their half-sister, Katya. Neither brother has given a reason for the split.

== Playing career ==
=== Junior ===
Bure played three games during the 1990–91 season with HC CSKA Moscow of the Soviet Championship League prior to leaving the Soviet Union. As a 17-year-old, Bure was eligible to play junior hockey upon his arrival in North America, and joined the Spokane Chiefs of the Western Hockey League (WHL), and became the first Russian player in the league's history. He joined the team one year before the Canadian Hockey League, of which the WHL is a member, instituted an import draft.

Bure recorded 49 points in 53 games in 1991–92 for the Chiefs, his first season in the WHL. The Montreal Canadiens selected him with their second round pick, 33rd overall, at the 1992 NHL entry draft. The NHL Central Scouting Bureau praised Bure as being a good skater. In its assessment, the Bureau added: "very smart around the net; good passer, playmaker. Good shot, quick release. Will take a hit to make the play. Good competitor." He returned to Spokane for the 1992–93 season where Bure led his team and finished second overall in WHL scoring with 147 points. His 68 goals that season remains a Chiefs' franchise record. He was named to the WHL's West Division First All-Star Team. Bure attended Montreal's training camp prior to the 1993–94 season, but was again returned to his junior team. He recorded 102 points in his final season in the WHL and was named to the Second All-Star Team. In three seasons with Spokane, Bure recorded 298 points and stands fourth on the Chiefs' all-time scoring list.

=== Montreal Canadiens ===
Upon turning professional in 1994–95, Bure spent the majority of the season with Montreal's American Hockey League (AHL) affiliate, the Fredericton Canadiens. He had 23 goals and 48 points in 45 games for the club. Bure earned a recall to Montreal late in the season and made his NHL debut on February 28, 1995, against the New York Islanders. His first goal came two weeks later, on March 15, against goaltender Wendell Young of the Pittsburgh Penguins. In 24 games with Montreal, Bure scored 3 goals and added an assist. Playing in his brother's shadow – Pavel had become a superstar in Vancouver – Valeri struggled to live up to the expectations placed on him. He scored 22 goals and 42 points in his first full season in Montreal, 1995–96, but scored only 14 goals the following season. He battled injuries that season; two concussions and a kidney injury limited him to 64 games, 13 fewer than the previous season.

At five feet ten inches (178 cm) tall, Bure was a smaller player in the NHL. His linemates Saku Koivu (five foot ten) and Oleg Petrov (five foot nine) were similarly diminutive, and the trio were known in Montreal as the "Smurf line". After playing 50 games for the Canadiens in 1997–98, Bure was traded. He was sent to the Calgary Flames in a February 1, 1998, deal in exchange for Jonas Höglund and Zarley Zalapski. The deal was welcomed by Bure, who appreciated both the ability to play closer to his family on the west coast as well as increased opportunity by joining a young Flames team. He recorded his first career hat trick in one of his first games in Calgary, against the Edmonton Oilers. Bure appeared in 16 games with the Flames that season and scored 38 points in 66 games combined between Montreal and Calgary.

=== Calgary Flames ===
Bure's offensive ability emerged in Calgary as he became one of the team's leading scorers. His totals of 26 goals and 53 points in 1998–99 were both third best on the team; at one point of the season, Bure scored the game-winning goal in four consecutive victories for Calgary. The departure of Flames' star Theoren Fleury added pressure on Bure to be an offensive leader in 1999–2000, and he responded to become one of the NHL's early scoring leaders. He used his speed and skating ability to good effect and was eighth in league scoring by mid-December. Bure was named to the World team at the 2000 All-Star Game where he played on a line with his brother. Pavel was named most valuable player of the game by scoring three goals, two of them assisted by Valeri, in a 9–4 victory over North America. Bure completed the season as the Flames leader in goals (35) and points (75, 14th overall in the NHL) and was the only player on the team to appear in all 82 games. Pavel Bure scored 58 goals for the Florida Panthers, and the brothers' combined total of 93 goals set an NHL record for a set of siblings.

Though his offensive production declined in 2000–01, Bure's 27 goals was second on the team to Jarome Iginla's 31 and he finished third with 55 points. He became embroiled in a power struggle with his coaches, first Don Hay who was dismissed mid-season, and then Greg Gilbert, as both wanted him play a more defensive-minded game. Bure struggled to adapt and at one point was held out of the Flames lineup by Gilbert in response. Bure was rumoured to have asked for a trade out of Calgary, and the Florida Panthers (who had acquired Pavel), Buffalo Sabres and New York Rangers were among the teams who showed interest in his services. On June 24, 2001, the Flames traded Bure, along with Jason Wiemer to the Panthers for Rob Niedermayer and a second round draft pick.

=== Florida, St. Louis and Dallas ===
As his contract had expired, Bure was a restricted free agent. Initially unable to come to an agreement with the Panthers on salary, Bure did not sign until late September. The delay resulted in his being a brief hold-out from Florida's training camp in advance of the 2001–02 season. Injury interrupted the start of Bure's Panthers career as a knee ailment that began bothering him before the season worsened as he played the first games of the campaign. Tests revealed damage to his right knee that required arthroscopic surgery to repair; Bure missed 37 games while recovering. A second knee injury ended Bure's season in mid-March as the Panthers had fallen out of playoff contention. His brother had already been traded by that point, and the Panthers were also making Valeri available in potential deals. He appeared in only 31 games and recorded 18 points.

Bure remained with the Panthers as the 2002–03 season began, but his year was marked by an offensive slump. He was also hampered by a hairline fracture to his wrist after Keith Primeau slashed him during an early December game against the Philadelphia Flyers. With only 5 goals and 26 points in 46 games for Florida, Bure was traded on March 11, 2003, to the St. Louis Blues in exchange for defenceman Mike Van Ryn. Another knee injury, this time a sprained ligament, kept Bure out of the Blues lineup for much of the remainder of the season. He recorded two assists each in five regular season and six post-season games for St. Louis. After the season, the Blues placed Bure on waivers, and he returned to Florida upon being claimed by the Panthers.

Free of injury for the first time in two seasons, Bure was one of the Panthers' offensive leaders in 2003–04. He reached 20 goals for the fifth time in his NHL career, and as the season's trade deadline approached, was Florida's leading scorer with 45 points. However, as the Panthers were out of playoff contention, they traded Bure to the Dallas Stars on March 9, 2004, in exchange for Drew Bagnall and a draft pick. Bure was placed on the Stars' top line with Mike Modano and Jere Lehtinen, and he recorded 7 points in 13 games to conclude the regular season. Bure added three assists in five playoff games.

An unrestricted free agent following the 2004 playoffs, Bure did not play anywhere in 2004–05 as the entire NHL season was canceled due to a labour dispute. He signed a one-year contract with the Los Angeles Kings for the 2005–06 season when the league resumed operations. He never played a regular season game for the Kings. A back injury suffered during the pre-season, initially just described as "soreness", kept him out of the regular lineup. The injury ultimately required surgery, and a second surgery on his hip caused Bure to miss the entire season. At the age of 31, he opted to retire following the surgeries.

=== International ===
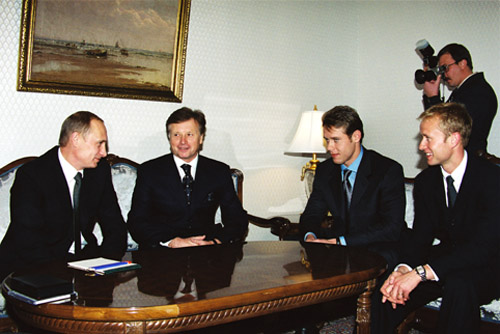
Bure (far right), brother Pavel (centre-right) meet with Russian Olympic Committee President Leonid Tyagachev and Russian President Vladimir Putin (left) in 2001.

Bure made his debut internationally with the Russian national junior team at the 1994 World Junior Championship. He was the leading scorer of the bronze medal-winning Russians with eight points in six games and was named to the tournament's All-Star Team. That same year, Bure first played with the senior team as he scored three goals in six contests at the 1994 World Championship in a fifth-place effort.

After appearing in one game at the inaugural World Cup of Hockey in 1996, Bure played in his first of two Olympic Games in 1998. The tournament marked the first time he played with his brother Pavel since they were briefly teammates with CSKA Moscow in 1991. Valeri scored one goal in the tournament, and Russia advanced to the gold medal game. They settled for the silver medal after being shut out by Dominik Hašek and the Czech Republic. Bure returned for the 2002 Salt Lake Games. He scored a goal in the tournament as Russia won the bronze medal. Russia invited him to play at the 2004 World Cup of Hockey, but as he was without an NHL contract at the time, Bure declined to play due to a lack of proper insurance in the event of injury.

== Personal life ==
Bure married actress Candace Cameron on June 22, 1996. They were introduced by Cameron's Full House castmate Dave Coulier at a charity hockey game in 1994. The couple has three children: daughter Natasha (b. 1998) and sons Lev (b. 2000) and Maksim (b. 2002). Bure became an American citizen in December 2001. Bure cited his family as the reason he retired from hockey in 2005. He felt he could return from his surgeries, but wanted to spend time with his children and allow his wife to return to acting. Bure and his family are Christians.

Both Valeri and his older brother Pavel became estranged from their father Vladimir Bure, along with his second wife, Julia, and their half-sister Katya, by 1998. Neither brother has explained a reason for the split.

In 2007, Bure and his wife opened a Florida restaurant called The Milk and Honey Café, but closed the business when the family moved to California. They operate a Napa Valley winery, Bure Family Wines. Bure developed an interest in wine early in his NHL career that he described as growing into a passion: "I fell in love with the behind-the-scenes work and being able to start from the vineyard and put it into a bottle. It's an amazing process." Bure modified the Russian imperial seal his great-grandfather stamped on his watches to use as his company's label.

Bure returned to the ice in 2010 as a contestant on the second season of the Canadian Broadcasting Corporation's figure skating reality show Battle of the Blades. The series was a competition that paired a former professional hockey player with a figure skater. Bure's partner was Ekaterina Gordeeva. The pair won the competition and shared a $100,000 prize donated to charities of their choice. Bure's donation was made to Compassion Canada.

== Career statistics ==
=== Regular season and playoffs ===
			Regular season					Playoffs
Season	Team	League	GP	G	A	Pts	PIM	GP	G	A	Pts	PIM
1990–91	CSKA Moscow	USSR	3	0	0	0	0	—	—	—	—	—
1991–92	Spokane Chiefs	WHL	53	27	22	49	78	10	11	6	17	10
1992–93	Spokane Chiefs	WHL	66	68	79	147	49	9	6	11	17	14
1993–94	Spokane Chiefs	WHL	59	40	62	102	48	3	5	3	8	2
1994–95	Fredericton Canadiens	AHL	45	23	25	48	32	—	—	—	—	—
1994–95	Montreal Canadiens	NHL	24	3	1	4	6	—	—	—	—	—
1995–96	Montreal Canadiens	NHL	77	22	20	42	28	6	0	1	1	6
1996–97	Montreal Canadiens	NHL	64	14	21	35	6	5	0	1	1	2
1997–98	Montreal Canadiens	NHL	50	7	22	29	33	—	—	—	—	—
1997–98	Calgary Flames	NHL	16	5	4	9	2	—	—	—	—	—
1998–99	Calgary Flames	NHL	80	26	27	53	22	—	—	—	—	—
1999–00	Calgary Flames	NHL	82	35	40	75	50	—	—	—	—	—
2000–01	Calgary Flames	NHL	78	27	28	55	26	—	—	—	—	—
2001–02	Florida Panthers	NHL	31	8	10	18	12	—	—	—	—	—
2002–03	Florida Panthers	NHL	46	5	21	26	10	—	—	—	—	—
2002–03	St. Louis Blues	NHL	5	0	2	2	0	6	0	2	2	8
2003–04	Florida Panthers	NHL	55	20	25	45	20	—	—	—	—	—
2003–04	Dallas Stars	NHL	13	2	5	7	6	5	0	3	3	0
NHL totals			621	174	226	400	221	22	0	7	7	16

=== International ===
Year	Team	Event	GP	G	A	Pts	PIM
1994	Russia	WJC	7	5	3	8	4
1994	Russia	WC	6	3	0	3	2
1996	Russia	WCH	1	0	0	0	2
1998	Russia	OLY	6	1	0	1	0
2002	Russia	OLY	6	1	0	1	2
Junior totals			7	5	3	8	4
Senior totals			19	5	0	5	6

== Awards and honors ==
Career
Award	Year	Ref
WHL West First All-Star Team	1992–93	
WHL West Second All-Star Team	1993–94	
World Junior All-Star Team	1994	
Played in NHL All-Star Game	2000	

== See also ==
- List of family relations in the NHL
- List of celebrities who own wineries and vineyards
