= Dave Del Dotto =

American businessman

David "Dave" P. Del Dotto
- Occupations: Real estate investor, vintner
- Years active: 1980s–present
- Known for: "Cash Flow System" infomercials
- Notable work: How to Make Nothing but Money (book)

David "Dave" P. Del Dotto is a former real estate investor from Modesto, California, who sold a course called the "Cash Flow System" through infomercials on late-night television in the 1980s and early 1990s. In addition to his Cash Flow System course, Del Dotto also wrote a book, How to Make Nothing but Money, which is no longer in print.

== Infomercial career ==
Del Dotto often shot his infomercials from locations in Hawaii with his students. As a self-proclaimed expert, he would give advice on real estate investment. Del Dotto had associates sell his book and tape programs to audiences throughout the United States and Canada. Those who bought the course would be invited to a weekend seminar. At the weekend events several additional speakers would sell their financial educational material, which usually included books and audio and video courses.

== Legal trouble ==
On October 22, 1993, the Los Angeles Times reported:

The Federal Trade Commission said David Del Dotto of Modesto and his wife, Yolanda, have settled charges that they deceptively represented features of their "Cash Flow System," a get-rich-quick real estate scheme sold to thousands of consumers on televised infomercials. The agency said the Del Dottos agreed not to make false claims about real estate, credit, investments or other business opportunities in the future. The FTC indicated it may seek a federal court order requiring the Del Dottos to give refunds.

In February 1995, the FTC filed suit against Del Dotto. In 1996, Del Dotto settled for $200,000 charges that he and his companies had made "allegedly deceptive claims" in marketing his books and audio tapes on real estate investment.

== Pop Culture ==
A clip of one of his videos was featured in the movie Houseguest, as well as Mississippi Masala.

== Current career ==
Since 1993, Del Dotto has been producing wine at Del Dotto Vineyards in Napa, California.

== See also ==
- List of celebrities who own wineries and vineyards
