= Moon Mountain District Sonoma County =

American Viticultural Area in California

Coordinates: 38°19′57″N 122°26′44″W

- Wine region
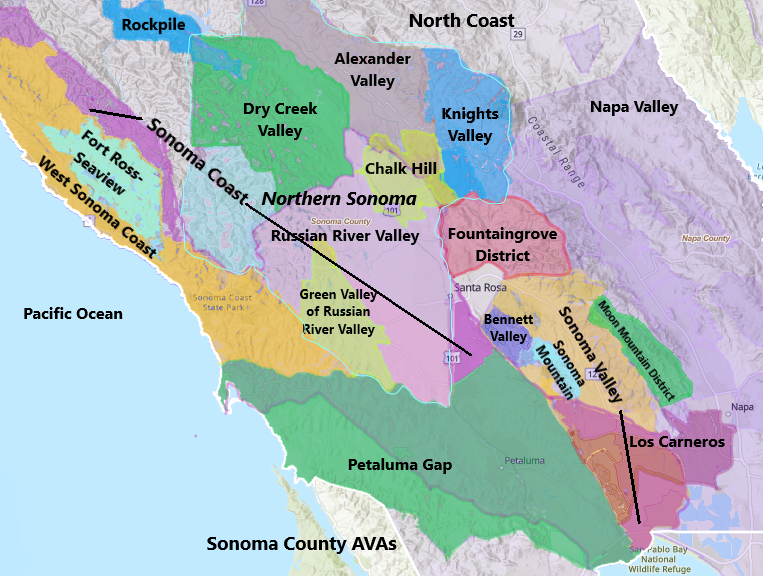
- Type: American Viticultural Area
- Year established: 2013
- Years of wine industry: 146
- Country: United States
- Part of: California, North Coast AVA, Sonoma County, Sonoma Valley AVA
- Other regions in California, North Coast AVA, Sonoma County, Sonoma Valley AVA: Bennett Valley AVA, Los Carneros AVA, Sonoma Mountain AVA
- Climate region: Region II-III
- Heat units: 2908–3326 GDD
- Soil conditions: Rocky, iron-rich volcanic
- Total area: 17,633 acres (28 sq mi)
- Size of planted vineyards: 1,500 acres (607 ha)
- No. of vineyards: 40
- Varietals produced: Cabernet Franc, Cabernet Sauvignon, Chardonnay, Malbec, Merlot, Petit Verdot, Pinot Noir, Syrah, Zinfandel
- No. of wineries: 11

Moon Mountain District Sonoma County is an American Viticultural Area (AVA) within Sonoma Valley and North Coast viticultural areas, just north of the city of Sonoma. This mountainous region on the very eastern edge of Sonoma County has a historic reputation for producing rich, intensely-flavored wines from Cabernet Sauvignon and Syrah varieties since the 1880s. The District was established as the nation's 211^{th}, the state's 118^{th} and the county's seventeenth appellation on October 2, 2013 by the Alcohol and Tobacco Tax and Trade Bureau (TTB), Treasury after reviewing the petition proposing the viticultural area named "Moon Mountain District Sonoma County." Its designation encompasses 17,663 acres (28 sq mi) stretching north–south along the western slopes of the Mayacamas mountains between Sugarloaf Ridge State Park and Los Carneros viticultural area with the Napa Valley's Mount Veeder viticultural area outlining the eastern slopes. Its name is derived from Moon Mountain, a mountain peak in the region. The name is also an indirect reference to Sonoma, which means 'valley of the moon' in the local Native American dialect. A clear view to San Francisco 50 miles (80 km) south is not uncommon from Moon Mountain District vineyards. The viticultural area contains 11 wineries and 40 commercially-producing vineyards that cultivate approximately 1,500 acres (610 ha) throughout the mountainous area around the hills and ridges. The plant hardiness zone ranges from 9a to 10a.

== Terroir ==
The distinguishing features of Moon Mountain District are its topography, geology, climate, and soils. It lies in one of the warmer parts of Sonoma County due to its inland location. At elevations ranging from 400 to 2,200 feet (120 to 670 m) above sea level, vines grow in a variety of soils, mainly rocky and of volcanic origin, on the western slopes and ridge tops of the Mayacamas Mountains. The district's boundaries are outlined by proceeding south along the mountain ridge from the Rutherford locale down the meandering Sonoma-Napa County boundary to the Sonoma-Napa county southeast intersection; then travels southwesterly in a straight line north of Arrowhead Mountain toward the Pueblo lands of Sonoma; the boundary then proceeds northwesterly along the western foothills, past the locales of Eldridge, Glen Ellen, through the Valley of the Moon and settling in the Kenwood vicinity; finally, turning east-northeasterly it proceeds to a marked 1,483-foot peak south of Sugarloaf Ridge and then east-southeasterly in a straight line back to the Sonoma-Napa County boundary.

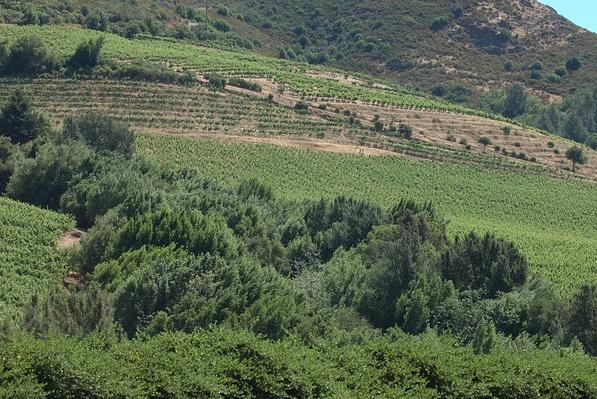
Moon Mountain vineyard

=== Climate ===
Crosswinds from both the Pacific Ocean to the west and San Pablo Bay in the south bring cooling maritime influences to the vineyards, but by the time the winds have travelled across the valley floor they have warmed considerably. Most of the region's vineyards face southwest, subjecting them to stronger afternoon sunlight. The higher elevation vineyards places their varietals above the influence of the famous Sonoma fog. The warmer climate gives Moon Mountain District a longer growing season than other parts of Sonoma Valley, with earlier budburst in the spring and a longer hang time for the grapes in the autumn. Cold air tends to drain off the hillside vineyards into the valley, reducing the risk of damaging frosts and allowing for a long, slow maturation period. As a result, Moon Mountain District grapes have a good balance of sugars and acidity, leading to well-balanced wines.

=== Soil ===
Moon Mountain's volcanic origins gave the area's winemakers cause to petition for a separate AVA title, which was approved in 2013. The region's iron-rich volcanic soils are quite distinct from the sedimentary soils of the surrounding area. These red, rocky soils are thin, well-drained and therefore highly suited to viticulture. Louis M. Martini's famed Monte Rosso vineyard, a 120-year-old vineyard within the appellation, is named for these red soils.
