= Bennett Valley AVA =

American Viticultural Area in California

Coordinates: 38°24′15″N 122°37′41″W

Bennett Valley
- Wine region
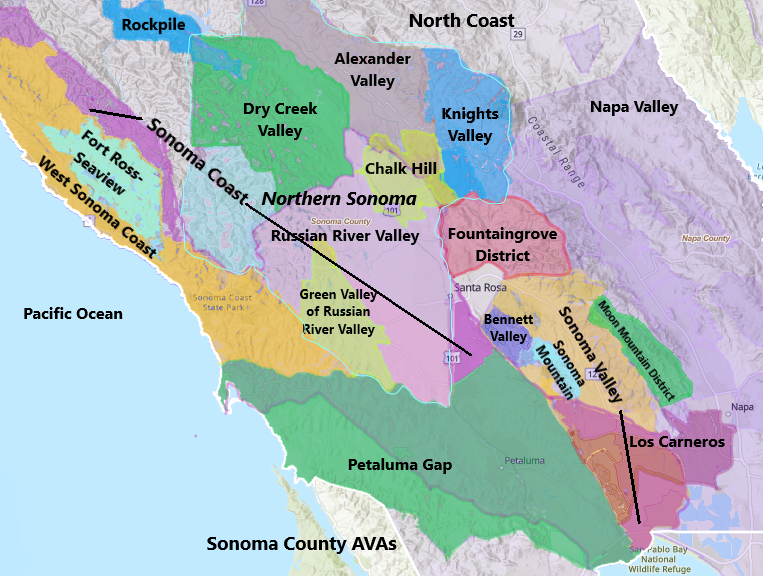
- Sonoma County AVAs
- Type: American Viticultural Area
- Year established: 2003
- Years of wine industry: 148
- Country: United States
- Part of: California, North Coast AVA, Sonoma County, Sonoma Coast AVA, Sonoma Valley AVA, Sonoma Mountain AVA
- Other regions in California, North Coast AVA, Sonoma County, Sonoma Coast AVA, Sonoma Valley AVA, Sonoma Mountain AVA: Los Carneros AVA, Sonoma Mountain AVA, Moon Mountain District Sonoma County AVA
- Growing season: 258 days
- Climate region: Region Ib-II
- Heat units: 2,500–3,000 GDD
- Precipitation (annual average): 36 to 40 in (910–1,020 mm)
- Soil conditions: Goulding clay, Cobbly Clay Loam and Complex undelain by metamorphosed igneous rock and weathered andesitic basalt
- Total area: 8,140 acres (13 sq mi)
- Size of planted vineyards: 650 acres (260 ha)
- No. of vineyards: 6
- Grapes produced: Barbera, Cabernet Franc, Cabernet Sauvignon, Chardonnay, Cinsault, Dolcetto, Freisa, Grenache, Merlot, Nebbiolo, Petite Sirah, Pinot Noir, Roussanne, Sauvignon Blanc, Syrah, Viognier, Zinfandel
- No. of wineries: 8

Bennett Valley is an American Viticultural Area (AVA) located in Sonoma County, California within the Bennett Valley landform. The boundaries of this appellation are outlined entirely within the North Coast AVA, primarily overlaps Sonoma Valley AVA and partially into both Sonoma Coast AVA and Sonoma Mountain AVA. It was established as the nation's 150^{th}, the state's 90^{th} and the county's thirteenth appellation on October 30, 2003 by the Alcohol and Tobacco Tax and Trade Bureau (TTB), Treasury after reviewing the petition submitted by Jean L. Arnold, CEO of Matanzas Creek Winery in Santa Rosa, proposing a new viticultural area in Sonoma County known as "Bennett Valley."

Sonoma Valley's smallest viticultural area of 8,140 acres (13 sq mi) is surrounded to the south, east and west by the Sonoma Mountains, southeast of the city of Santa Rosa and approximately 45 miles (72 km) northeast of San Francisco on U.S. 101. The region receives a moderating effect on its climate from the Pacific Ocean through the cool coastal fogs and breeze that creep into the area from the southwest through Crane Canyon between Sonoma Mountain and Taylor Mountain. At the outset, its vineyards cultivated about 650 acres (260 ha) with Barbera, Cabernet Sauvignon, Cabernet Franc, Chardonnay, Grenache, Merlot, Pinot Noir, Sauvignon Blanc and Syrah are the leading grape varieties. The Bennett Valley appellation is almost entirely within the Sonoma Valley viticultural area. The Sonoma Mountain viticultural area, which is totally within the larger Sonoma Valley viticultural area, overlaps 1,063 acres (430 ha) (13.1%) of the Bennett Valley. A small part, 251 acres (102 ha) (3.4%), of the Bennett Valley viticultural area overlaps into the Sonoma Coast viticultural area. The Sonoma Coast and the interior Sonoma Valley viticultural areas, both within the larger North Coast appellation, share a common boundary line along Sonoma Valley's western border. This common boundary line is the site of the boundary's small overlap into the Sonoma Coast viticultural area. The plant hardiness zone ranges from 9a to 10a.

== History ==
In the early 1800s, two competing groups of different nationalities were settling in Sonoma County: Russian explorers based at Fort Ross on the coast and Spanish settlers moving north from San Francisco. Around 1834 General Mariano Vallejo was sent to take control of the territory above San Francisco and block further expansion by the Russians. Generous land grants made by Vallejo in this connection greatly expedited the settlement of Sonoma County in the areas of Santa Rosa, Healdsburg, and Kenwood. One of these grants, a portion of Santa Rosa township encompassing a relatively small area southeast of the city of Santa Rosa, was known as "Yulupa." The boundaries of the Yulupa land grant coincide very closely with, and entirely contain, the area now known as Bennett Valley.

Bennett Mountain and Bennett Valley were named in honor of one of the earliest settlers, a man from Missouri named James N. Bennett, an 1849 immigrant who arrived by wagon train. He paused his travel to nurse his ailing daughter, who subsequently died of typhoid fever and was buried at the foot of the mountain called "Yulupa Peak" at the time, but now bears his name. Bennett decided to settle in the valley permanently, became a prosperous citizen, and in 1854, as a State Assemblyman, introduced the bill that made Santa Rosa the county seat. Within a decade of Vallejo's arrival, people began settling Sonoma County in large numbers due to the 1846 Bear Flag Revolt and the 1849 Gold Rush helping Bennett Valley grow as an agricultural region known for grapes, apples, hay, wheat, oats, barley, and livestock. By 1884 Bennett Valley had become a highly productive agricultural region. An October 29, 1949 article in the Press Democrat titled "Picturesque Bennett Valley Scene of Farm Prosperity," described this period in Bennett Valley's early history:

"Bennett Valley's rich soil on the valley floor proper and on the lower rolling slopes of the hills drew settlers speedily. Men and women who came in search of gold in the mines found agricultural gold in the sunshine drenched valley."

The population of 300 in Bennett Valley raised grapes, apples, hay, wheat, oats, barley, and engaged in all types of animal husbandry. Other activities in the valley at that time included coal mining and a hot springs resort on Taylor Mountain. Settler John Shakleford Taylor came to Bennett Valley in 1853 and purchased 2,000 acres (810 ha) on the mountain that now bears his name. Taylor, the largest landholder in the county, owned some of the richest and most productive valley lands in Santa Rosa. but he is best remembered for his "White Sulphur Springs" resort (later renamed "The Kawana Springs Resort") in St. Helena.

Taylor sent carriages into the town several times a day to meet the affluent San Franciscans and tourists who traveled by steamer across the Bay and then four miles by stage and later by train, bringing the weary travelers back to his large hotel to recuperate and relax in the natural springs. At its prime, California's oldest resort was able to accommodate 1000 guests in its grand hotels which were later lost to local wildfires. The site is recognized as a National Historic Landmark.

Bennett Valley's population grew slowly and steadily. In 1851 Bennett Valley formed its first school district (called the Santa Rosa School District) and built a small schoolhouse "near the bridge at Matanzas Creek" according to the 1949 Press Democrat article quoted earlier. About four years later, a second school district was organized "at the other end of the valley." The schoolhouse serving the Strawberry School District was located on the westernmost stretch of Sonoma Mountain Road, a short distance south of its intersection with Bennett Valley Road. In 1873 the Bennett Valley Grange was built as a focal point for community agricultural activities; this historic hall, the oldest active grange in America, still stands on Grange Road.

Bennett Valley has a rich viticultural history. Settlers to the area began planting vineyards and making wine in the mid-1800s. Isaac DeTurk, whom prominent Santa Rosa historian and columnist Gaye LeBaron called "The pioneer vineyardist and winemaker in the Santa Rosa Valley," started his winemaking career at the base of Bennett Mountain with his famed "Yulupa Vineyard." He planted thirty acres of vines in 1862, later increasing his vineyard to fifty acres. The vineyard was about equally divided between Mission and Zinfandel grapes. After selling his first crop to a Santa Rosa neighbor, he crushed his second vintage of 15,000 gallons at his Belle Mount Winery (named in honor of Bennett Mountain) in 1867. The winery was located on the northeast side of the intersection of Bennett Valley Road and Grange Road, in the heart of Bennett Valley.
One of the most ambitious and prominent vintners in Sonoma County, DeTurk was soon buying grapes from neighboring vineyards, and in 1878 he expanded his winemaking capacity in Bennett Valley to 100,000 gallons. He also built a larger winery in the city of Santa Rosa and a third winery in Cloverdale. He finally sold his small Bennett Valley vineyard to George Davis in 1885 in order to acquire twelve hundred acres east of Kenwood in Los Guillicos Valley, where he established what was at the time one of Sonoma Valley's largest vineyards. At the height of his success, his Santa Rosa winery was one•of the largest in the state, with a storage capacity of a million gallons of wine. He produced award-winning clarets, sherry, port, and Riesling, and shipped his wines to Chicago, St. Louis, and New York.
The name of Bennett Valley frequently appears in historical sources in connection with 19th century grape growers and wine makers. The petition lists the names of twenty-four growers who have been specifically linked with Bennett Valley in historic accounts and the locations of these growers are indicated on the historic maps reproduced in petition attachments.

David Steiner, one of the first to replant winegrapes in Bennett Valley in modern times, was aware of the area's significant viticultural heritage. He was quoted in an article entitled, "Move Over Napa, Here Comes Bennett Valley" by Ray Smith, published in the "Press Democrat" on October 11, 1978, as follows:

"Oldtimers say there once were 2,000 acres planted to vines out here,' says one of the growers, David Steiner, 'and I think we are just getting started again as a grape growing region."

Unfortunately, by the turn of the century many of Bennett Valley's vineyards were destroyed by phylloxera. The rest of the winegrape industry in the valley was killed a few decades later by the enactment of Prohibition, and almost all the vineyards in Bennett Valley was converted to other agricultural purposes. Viticulture began to return to Bennett Valley in the 1970s. Ray Smith reported on its progress in the same article:

" ...not far east of the golf course the valley between Bennett Mountain and ridge on the north and the Sonoma Mountains on the south opens up to grazing land, some truck farmers, and varietal grapes planted mostly on oak-studded slopes of the mountains and rolling hills."

"Of the 1,700 residents there are about 20 grape growers, most of them small to medium landowners who have come into the valley in the past 10 years and planted to the point where there are now between 500 and 600 acres (200 and 240 ha) in vines."

"That may seem like only peanuts compared with the thousands of acres planted to grapes elsewhere in Sonoma County, but Bennett Valley growers see a potential of 1,200 to 1,500 acres (490–610 ha) of grapes."

David Steiner was also one of the founders, along with Sandra Maciver, of Matanzas Creek Winery, the first winery to be established in Bennett Valley in the 20th century. Writes Mary Tanner in her article "Bennett Valley: Taking Control of its Destiny," which appeared in "Wine Country" magazine's June 1981 issue:

"Sonoma County's Bennett Valley is a blossoming viticultural and wine producing area .... producing excellent wines and highly coveted grapes that will encourage growers of grapes, not houses, to cultivate the land."

Grape acreage returned to Bennett Valley at a slow pace at first, but new vineyards continue to be planted. At the outset, there were approximately 650 acres (260 ha) of winegrapes in the appellation. These include Merlot (42% of the planted acreage), Chardonnay (30%), Pinot Noir (8%), Syrah (7%) and a lesser amounts of other varietals including Cabernet Sauvignon, Cabernet Franc, Barbera, Cinsault, Dolcetto, Freisa, Grenache, Nebbiolo, Viognier, and Zinfandel."

== Terroir ==
=== Topography ===
Bennett Valley is surrounded on three sides by the Sonoma Mountain Range and on the north side by the city of Santa Rosa. The mountainous boundaries, generally defined by ridgelines, indicate the outer limits of the Matanzas Creek watershed. Taylor and Bennett Mountains provide anchors for the area's western and eastern boundary, respectively, while the 1,600-foot (490 m) elevation line on Sonoma Mountain defines the southern boundary. Elevations within the area range from 250 to 1,850 feet (76–564 m), with most vineyards between the 500–600-foot (150–180 m) level. The Bennett Valley viticultural area boundary starts at Taylor Mountain's peak and continues straight northeast, coinciding with a portion of the Sonoma Valley viticultural area boundary line. The lower northern elevations open to the Santa Rosa Valley and the city of Santa Rosa, where, at the northernmost point, the boundary line turns southeast at a 65-degree angle. The northeastern and eastern boundaries, primarily a series of straight lines connecting elevation points, follow the ridgelines through the peak of Bennett Mountain that outline the eastern side of the Matanzas Creek watershed. The Bennett Valley area's southern boundary follows the 1,600-foot (490 m) elevation line along Sonoma Mountain's north side and then a westerly straight line to a 900-foot (270 m) elevation point. The southwestern boundary uses intersections and markers, within the Matanzas Creek watershed, to close the boundary line at Taylor Mountain. Crane Canyon, on the area's southwestern side, provides an opening in the mountains for the cooling coastal fogs and breezes from the Pacific coast, which moderate the Bennett Valley's climate.

=== Climate ===
The Bennett Valley viticultural area has a unique microclimate, resulting from its sheltered inland location and access to cooling coastal fogs and breezes. The broad and tall Sonoma Mountain diverts the foggy, south-to-north coastal breezes of the Petaluma Gap to the north and into the Crane Canyon gap. This gap, between Sonoma Mountain and Taylor Mountain, funnels the coastal fog and winds east into the Bennett Valley. Rainfall amounts in the Bennett Valley area are between 36 to 40 inches (910 to 1,020 mm), 17 to 25 percent higher than in the areas to the immediate north and east. Valley residents indicate that rainfall amounts vary with elevation and proximity to the mountains and wind patterns.

=== Soils ===
Bennett Valley viticultural area soils vary from the surrounding areas, due to the different composition percentages of its predominant Goulding-Toomes-Guenoc Association. There are differences in the distribution of Spreckels, Laniger, Haire, and Red Hill clay loam soils between the Bennett Valley viticultural area and nearby portions of the Sonoma Valley viticultural area. Soils in the Sonoma Mountain viticultural area, other than the overlapping portion, vary from those within the Bennett Valley area. The foothills soils, consisting primarily of the Goulding-Toomes-Guenoc Association, are of a volcanic origin that include lava flows, tuff beds, sandstone, gravel, and some conglomerate. The lower slopes and valley floor soils have more variety, including some of alluvial origin. The distribution of Spreckels loam, a well-drained loam with clay subsoil is about 24 percent in the Bennett Valley area, 27 percent in the Sonoma Mountain viticultural area, and almost 42 percent in the common area that overlaps the two areas.
