= Gérard Bertrand =

French rugby union player & winemaker

- Born: 27 January 1965 (age 60); Narbonne, Aude, France
- Occupation(s): winemaker, writer
- Organization: Gérard Bertrand Wines
- Known for: Winemaking
- Spouse: Ingrid Bertrand
- Children: Emma Bertrand; Mathias Bertrand

Rugby union career
- Position(s): Flanker
Senior career
Years	Team	Apps	(Points)
1993–1994	Stade Français		()
1984–1993	RC Narbonne		()
- Website: www.gerard-bertrand.com

Gérard Bertrand (born January 27, 1965) is a former rugby union player who represented France, RC Narbonne, and the Stade Français and then retired from rugby to take over the family estate after the accidental death of his father to become a renowned winemaker of Languedoc-Roussillon.

== Early life ==
Born on January 27, 1965, in Narbonne (Aude, France), Bertrand was then provided by his father Georges Bertrand his first experience in harvesting and winemaking at Domaine of Villemajou in Boutenac, in the Corbières region. In 1983, Gérard successfully received his Baccalauréat diploma and started his undergraduate studies in business administration and sport in Toulouse.

== Rugby career ==
Bertrand practiced rugby at the highest level. In 1984 he started his career with RC Narbonne, where he played for 17 years. He finished his career in 1994 as captain of the Stade Français. During that season, the club was promoted. From 1987 to 1994, Bertrand was both rugby player and wine grower. After his retirement, Bertrand became president of the RC Narbonne.

== Wine Estates ==
Gérard Bertrand owns or manages 13 estates in the Languedoc Roussillon Region: Château de Villemajou, Domaine de Cigalus, Château Laville Bertrou, Château l'Hospitalet, Château Aigues Vives, Domaine de l'Aigle, Château la Sauvageonne, Château de la Soujeole, Clos d'Ora, Château des Karantes, Château de Tarailhan, Château des 2 Rocs, and Domaine du Temple.

== Awards ==
In 2013, Gérard Bertrand is awarded the title of Red Winemaker of the Year 2012 in the International Wine Challenge.
