= Sonoma Valley AVA =

American Viticultural Area in Sonoma County, California

Coordinates: 38°20′58″N 122°29′56″W

Sonoma Valley
- Wine region
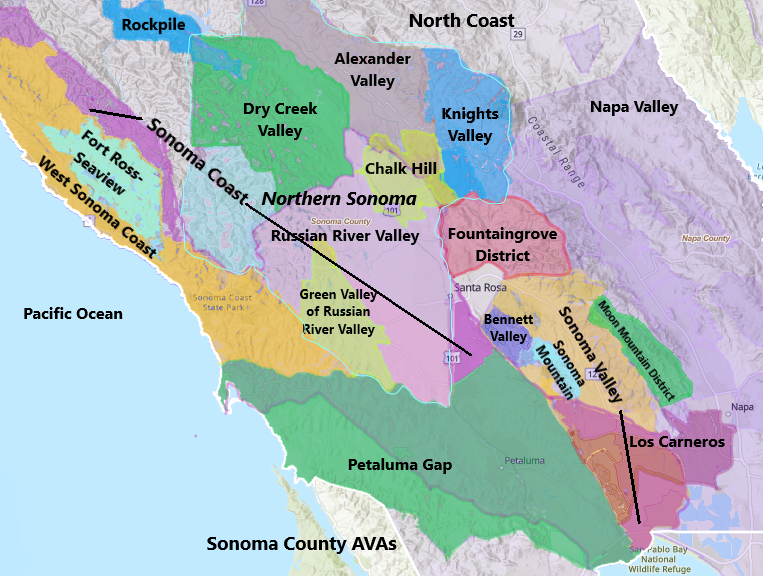
- Sonoma County AVAs
- Type: American Viticultural Area
- Year established: 1981
- Years of wine industry: 169
- Country: United States
- Part of: California, North Coast AVA, Sonoma County
- Other regions in California, North Coast AVA, Sonoma County: Sonoma Coast AVA, Chalk Hill AVA, Alexander Valley AVA, Green Valley of Russian River Valley AVA, Dry Creek Valley AVA, Russian River Valley AVA, West Sonoma Coast AVA, Knights Valley AVA
- Sub-regions: Bennett Valley AVA, Los Carneros AVA, Sonoma Mountain AVA, Moon Mountain District Sonoma County AVA
- Growing season: 249 days
- Climate region: Region I-II
- Heat units: 1,500–2,964 GDD
- Precipitation (annual average): less than 20 to 50 in (510–1,270 mm)
- Soil conditions: clay loam to loams on steep to level slopes
- Total area: 72,402 acres (113 sq mi)
- Size of planted vineyards: 13,000 acres (5,300 ha)
- Grapes produced: Aleatico, Alicante Bouschet, Barbera, Burger, Cabernet Franc, Cabernet Sauvignon, Carignane, Chardonnay, Gewurztraminer, Grand Noir, Grenache, Lenoir, Malbec, Marsanne, Merlot, Mourvedre, Muscadelle, Muscat Canelli, Nebbiolo, Palomino, Petit Bouschet, Petit Verdot, Petite Sirah, Pinot noir, Primitivo , Riesling, Roussanne, Sangiovese, Sauvignon Blanc, Semillon, Silvaner, Syrah, Tannat, Tempranillo, Teroldego, Trousseau Gris, Viognier, Zinfandel
- No. of wineries: 114

Sonoma Valley is an American Viticultural Area (AVA) located within the Sonoma Valley landform occupying the southeastern portion of Sonoma County, California. The name "Sonoma" means 'Valley of the Moon' in the indigenous Chocuyen dialect. The wine appellation was established on December 4, 1981, as the nation's ninth, the state's seventh and the county's initial AVA by the Bureau of Alcohol, Tobacco and Firearms (ATF), Treasury after reviewing the petition submitted by the Sonoma Valley Vintners Association of Santa Rosa, on behalf of Sonoma Valley wineries and grape growers proposing the new viticultural area named "Sonoma Valley."

The 72,402-acre (113 sq mi) viticultural area cultivates 13,000 acres (5,300 ha) under vine and is flanked by two mountain ranges: the Mayacamas Mountains to the east and the Sonoma Mountains to the west. The plant hardiness zone ranges from 9a to 10a.

== History ==
Sonoma Valley has played a significant role in the history of California wine. The first vineyards in the valley were planted by Franciscan friars at Mission San Francisco Solano in 1823. In 1834, General Mariano Guadalupe Vallejo expanded these plantings. In the late 1850s Jacob Gundlach and Count Agoston Haraszthy established major plantings of the European vine, Vitis Vinifera, the first such plantings in the United States. In 1857, Haraszthy established one of California's first successful commercial wineries here when he founded Buena Vista Winery.
Sonoma Valley is also responsible for one of the most important technological advances in modern viticulture. It was in Sonoma Valley that Mr. Julius Dresel pioneered the first commercially successful grafting of vinifera vines onto native, disease resistant, root stock. During the last quarter of the nineteenth century this technique saved the California wine industry from extinction as phylloxera ravaged its vineyards.
In 1900, there were approximately 4,000 acres (1,600 ha) of vineyards in the Sonoma Valley producing hundreds of thousands of gallons of premium wine. These wines were well known and accepted not only in California but also in the Eastern United States and in Europe. The industry ballooned by 1920 with 256 wineries in Sonoma Valley with more than 20,000 acres (8,100 ha) dedicated to grape vines. Prohibition affected Sonoma Valley as hard as any other wine region in California where most wineries were unable to continue operating. Recovery after the 1933 Repeal of Prohibition was slow, and only about 50 wineries survived.
In 1969, there were still only 58 bonded wineries in Sonoma Valley. The valley viticulture industry began to expand rapidly in the 1970s and 1980s. By 1975 some 24,000 acres (9,700 ha) of wine grapes were cultivated. Sonoma Valley boundaries were formally established in 1981 as the Sonoma County's first wine appellation. By 2005, there were 254 wineries, and over 65,000 acres (26,000 ha) under vine. The wine industry annually contributes over $8 billion USD to the local economy.

== Terroir ==
=== Topography ===
Sonoma Valley viticultural area is unique in soil composition and climate. The valley is the driest area in Sonoma County. The area's location and surrounding mountains protect it from the intense heat of California's Central Valley and from the fog intrusion which affects the climate of the Santa Rosa-Petaluma Valley and Sonoma Plains area. The viticultural area, located in the southeastern comer of Sonoma County, receives less rainfall than other portions of Sonoma County north of the city of Santa Rosa. In addition, the Sonoma Mountains, ranging along the western border of the viticultural area, prevent the heavy fog often found in the area of Petaluma from intruding into most of the Sonoma Valley area. These same mountains along with the Mayacamas Range on the eastern boundary of the viticultural area geographically isolate the area from surrounding areas. This geographical isolation and the proximity of the San Pablo Bay on the southern end of the area combine to moderate the summer and winter temperature extremes in the valley.

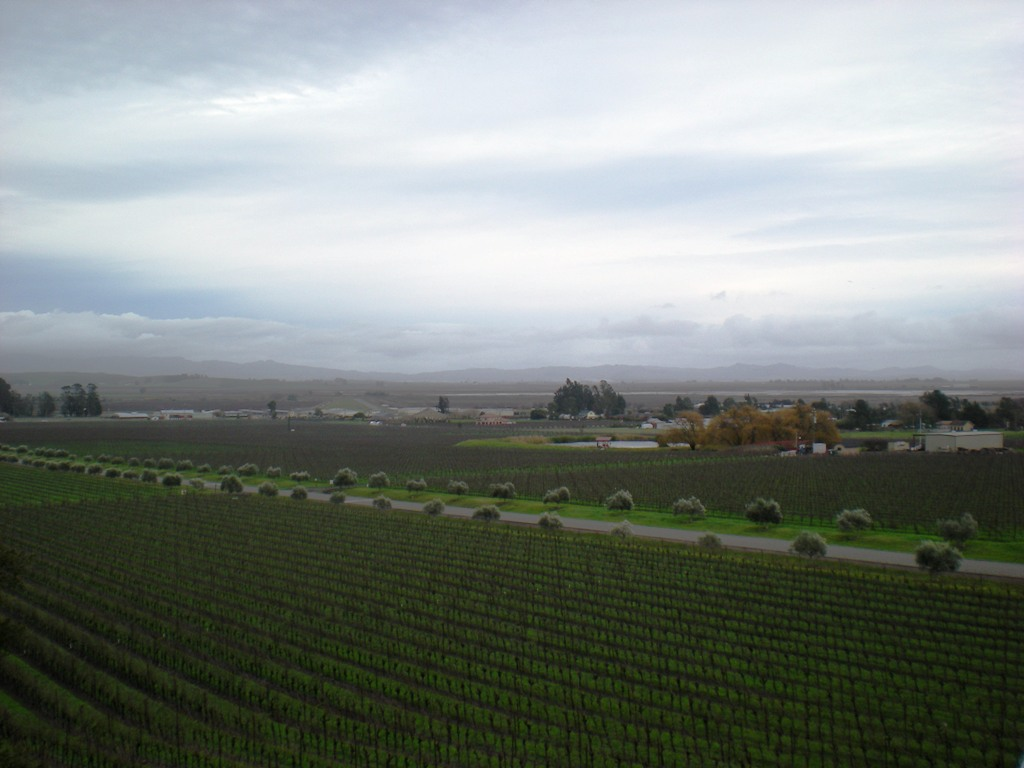
Sonoma Valley vineyards

=== Climate ===
Sonoma Valley viticultural area is distinguishable from the surrounding areas because of its climate. The area is known for its unique terroir with Sonoma Mountains protecting the area from the wet and cool influence of the nearby Pacific Ocean. The mountains to the west help protect the valley from excessive rainfall. The cool air that does affect the region comes northward from San Pablo Bay through the Los Carneros region and southward from the Santa Rosa Plain. The viticultural area, located in the southeastern corner of Sonoma County, receives less rainfall than other portions of Sonoma County north of the city of Santa Rosa. In addition, the Sonoma Mountains along the western border prevent the heavy fog often found in the area of Petaluma from intruding into most of the Sonoma Valley area. These same mountains along with the Mayacamas Range on the eastern boundary of the viticultural area geographically isolate the area from surrounding areas. This geographical isolation and the proximity of the San Pablo Bay on the southern end of the area combine to moderate the summer and winter temperature extremes in the valley.

Sonoma Valley is characterized by moderate temperatures with an average annual temperature of 56 °F (13 °C). Proximity of San Pablo Bay and the predominantly southerly winds combine to keep the Sonoma Valley fairly cool in the summer. In addition to keeping the area warmer in the winter. This moderating effect on temperature decreases as one moves north through the Valley. Therefore, temperature ranges are greater at the northern end of the Valley with more days over l00°F in summer and infrequent light snow, usually less than one inch per year, at the higher elevations, in winter. In summer, Sonoma Valley is protected from the intense heat of California's Central Valley by the Coast Range Mountains to the north and east and by its proximity to San Francisco Bay and the Pacific Ocean to the south and west.
Sonoma Valley is the driest area of Sonoma County with average precipitation varying from less than 20 inches (510 mm) annually to more than 50 inches (1,300 mm) on the highest peaks surrounding the Valley. One year in ten only 10 inches (250 mm) of rainfall is recorded on the Valley floor while, at the other extreme one year in ten, total precipitation exceeds 30 inches (760 mm).

=== Soils ===
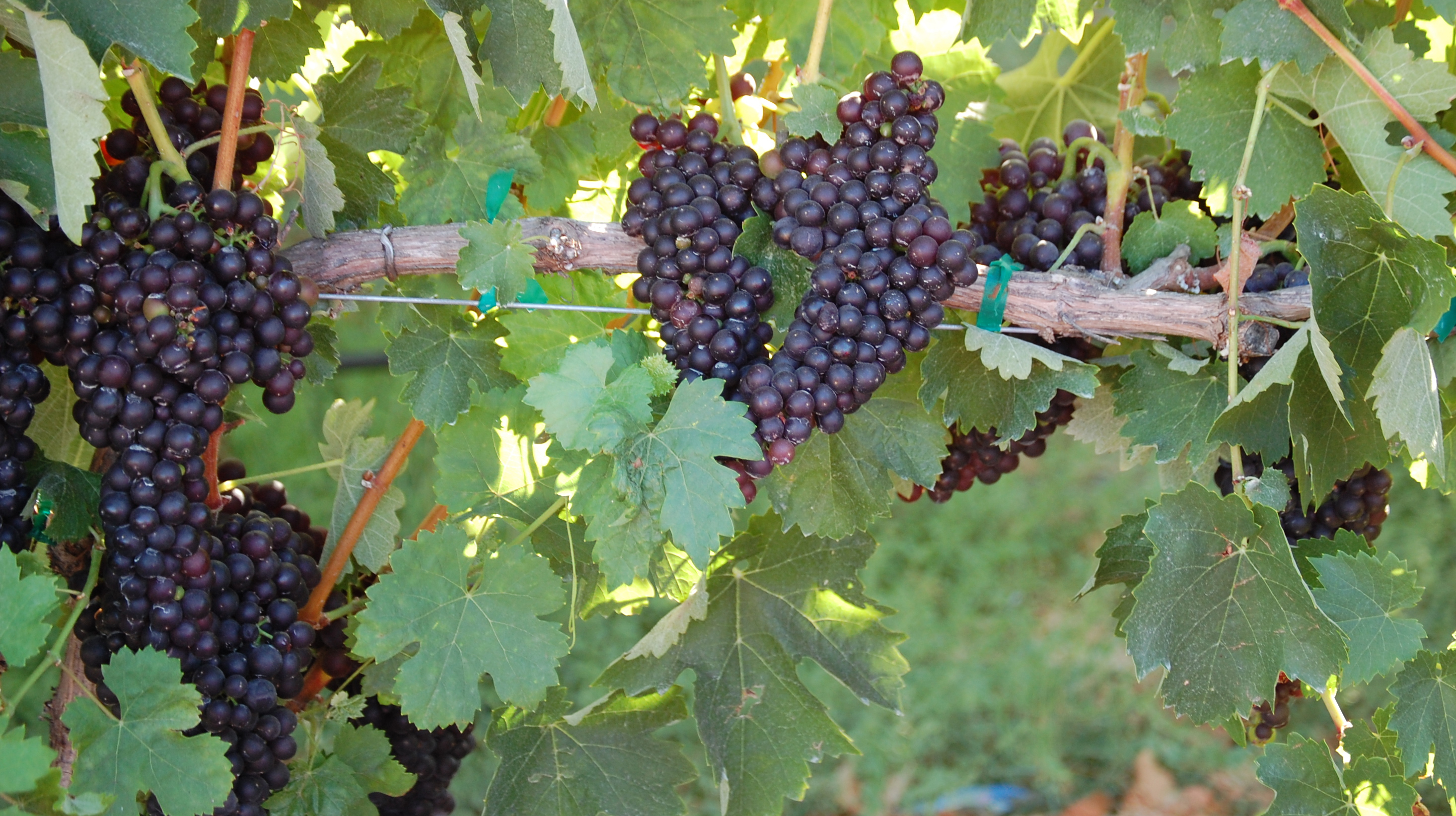
Sonoma Valley grapevines

While there are fifteen soil associations in Sonoma County, only nine of these occur in Sonoma Valley. A soil association is a landscape that has a distinctively proportional pattern of soils. It normally consists of one or more major soils and at least one minor soil. While the same soil associations may appear in more than one area, the patterns of major and minor soils comprising the soil associations are unique to each area. This variation in soil associations results in Sonoma Valley's unique soil composition, which in turn contributes to the excellent quality of its wines.

== See also ==
- Sonoma County wine
