= Sonoma Mountain AVA =

American Viticultural Area in Sonoma County, California

Coordinates: 38°21′55″N 122°34′18″W

Sonoma Mountain
- Wine region
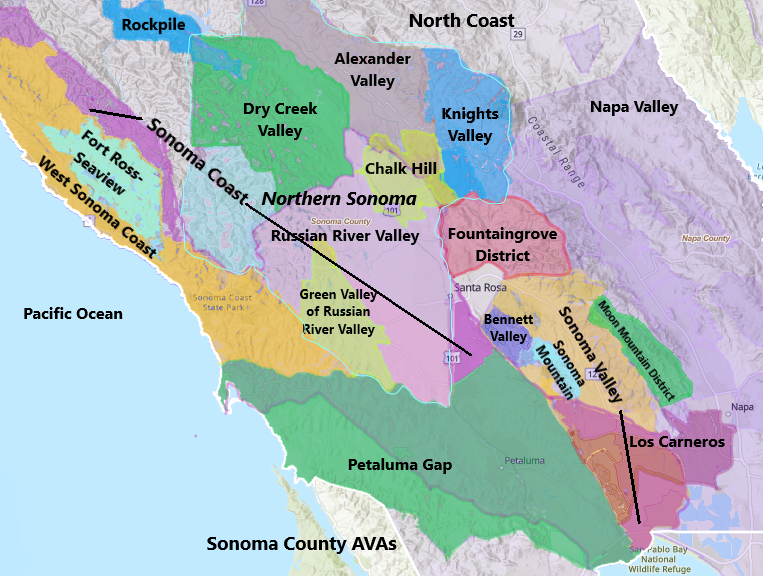
- Type: American Viticultural Area
- Year established: 1985
- Years of wine industry: 164
- Country: United States
- Part of: California, North Coast AVA, Sonoma County, Sonoma Valley AVA
- Other regions in California, North Coast AVA, Sonoma County, Sonoma Valley AVA: Bennett Valley AVA, Los Carneros AVA, Moon Mountain District Sonoma County AVA
- Growing season: 249 days
- Climate region: Region I-II
- Heat units: 1,500–2,564 GDD
- Precipitation (annual average): 40 to 50 in (1,000–1,300 mm)
- Soil conditions: Spreckles-Felta red loam and light red gravelly mountain soil
- Total area: 5,000 acres (8 sq mi)
- Size of planted vineyards: 800 acres (320 ha)
- No. of vineyards: 23
- Grapes produced: Cabernet Franc, Cabernet Sauvignon, Chardonnay, Merlot, Petit Verdot, Pinot Gris/Grigio, Pinot Meunier, Pinot Noir, Sauvignon Blanc, Sémillon, Syrah/Shiraz, Zinfandel
- No. of wineries: 5

Sonoma Mountain is an American Viticultural Area (AVA) located in southern Sonoma County, California centered on the 2,463-foot (751 m) Sonoma Mountain landform within the Sonoma Mountains. The wine appellation was established on January 23, 1985 as the nation's 75^{th}, the state's 44^{th} and the county's ninth AVA by the Bureau of Alcohol, Tobacco and Firearms (ATF), Treasury after reviewing the petition submitted by Mr. David Steiner, a local grape grower, on behalf of himself and area viticulturists, proposing a new viticultural area in Sonoma County named "'Sonoma Mountain."

The appellation includes the town of Glen Ellen, California and sits on the western edge of the "Valley of the Moon" defining the unique hillside terroir characteristic features of the Sonoma Mountain wine region. At the outset, the 5,000-acre (8 sq mi) Sonoma Mountain cultivated approximately 571 acres (231 ha) on 23 elevated vineyards ranginq in size from 3 to 115 acres (1.2 to 46.5 ha) with more in the planning stages. The area also had three bonded wineries and two more were being contemplated. The mountain area is known for its diverse micro-climates that occurs within the crevices and folds of the terrain on exposed hillsides and shaded drainages favoring production of a wide range of varieties including Cabernet Sauvignon, Chardonnay, Pinot Noir, Sauvignon Blanc, Sémillon, and Zinfandel. The plant hardiness zone ranges from 9b to 10a.

== History ==
Sonoma Valley has played a significant role in the history of California viticulture. The first vineyards in Sonoma were planted by Franciscan friars at Mission San Francisco Solano in 1823. The name "Sonoma" was given to the area in 1834 by General Mariano Guadalupe Vallejo which originated from the indigenous Chocuyen name for the "Valley of the Moon." The name "Sonoma," first described the valley but was also given to the range on the western side of the valley, and the area's most prominent peak. General Vallejo established the town of Sonoma in 1835 and expanded the vineyard plantings.
In 1857, the first winery in California, Buena Vista Winery, was opened in Sonoma by Count Agoston Haraszthy. Some five years later in 1862 Jackson Temple planted the first vineyards on Sonoma Mountain, shortly afterwards building the first winery on the site now known as the Jack London Ranch. In 1867, Robert Potter Hill, a major landowner around Glen Ellen, planted 80 acres (32 ha) of vineyard land now owned by the State of California. Viticulture was well established on Sonana Mouuntain by 1877 when Thonas H. Thompson published his pioneer work, "Historical Atlas of Sonoma County, California." The map of Sonoma Mountain on pp. 54 and 55 of this atlas shows the many ranches which had sprung up on the Mountain by that time. J.P. Munro-Frazier's 1879 "History of Sonoma County," discusses many of the vineyard owners on Sonoma Mountain and corroborates much of the information in Thompson's "Atlas." Munro-Frazier includes Sonoma Mountain in his observation "that in the opinion of many (this area is) the finest grape growing section in the State of California."
In the early 1900's difficult economic times and the ravages of phylloxera took its toll on the local vineyards, although Jack London, in "John Barleycorn," (1913}, notes the vitality of Sonoma Mountain viticulture. Sonoma Valley is also responsible for one of the most important technological advances in modern viticulture. It was in Sonoma Valley that Mr. Julius Dresel pioneered the first commercially successful grafting of vinifera vines onto native, disease resistant, root stock. During the last quarter of the nineteenth century this technique saved the California wine industry from extinction as phylloxera ravaged its vineyards. In 1900, there were approximately 4,000 acres (1,600 ha) of vineyards in the Sonoma Valley producing hundreds of thousands of gallons of premium wine. These wines were well known and accepted not only in California but also in the Eastern United States and in Europe. The industry ballooned by 1920 with 256 wineries in Sonoma Valley with more than 20,000 acres (8,100 ha) dedicated to grape vines.
Prohibition affected Sonoma Valley as hard as any other wine region in California where most wineries were unable to continue operating. Recovery after the 1933 Repeal of Prohibition was slow, and only about 50 wineries survived. In 1969, there were still only 58 bonded wineries in Sonoma Valley. Sonoma viticulture industry began to expand rapidly in the 1970s and 1980s surpassing even the heyday of the late 1890's. By 1975 some 24,000 acres (9,700 ha) of wine grapes were cultivated. Sonoma Valley boundaries were formally established in 1981 as the Sonoma County's first wine appellation. By 2005, there were 254 wineries, and over 65,000 acres (26,000 ha) under vine. The wine industry annually contributes over $8 billion USD to the local economy.

== Terroir ==
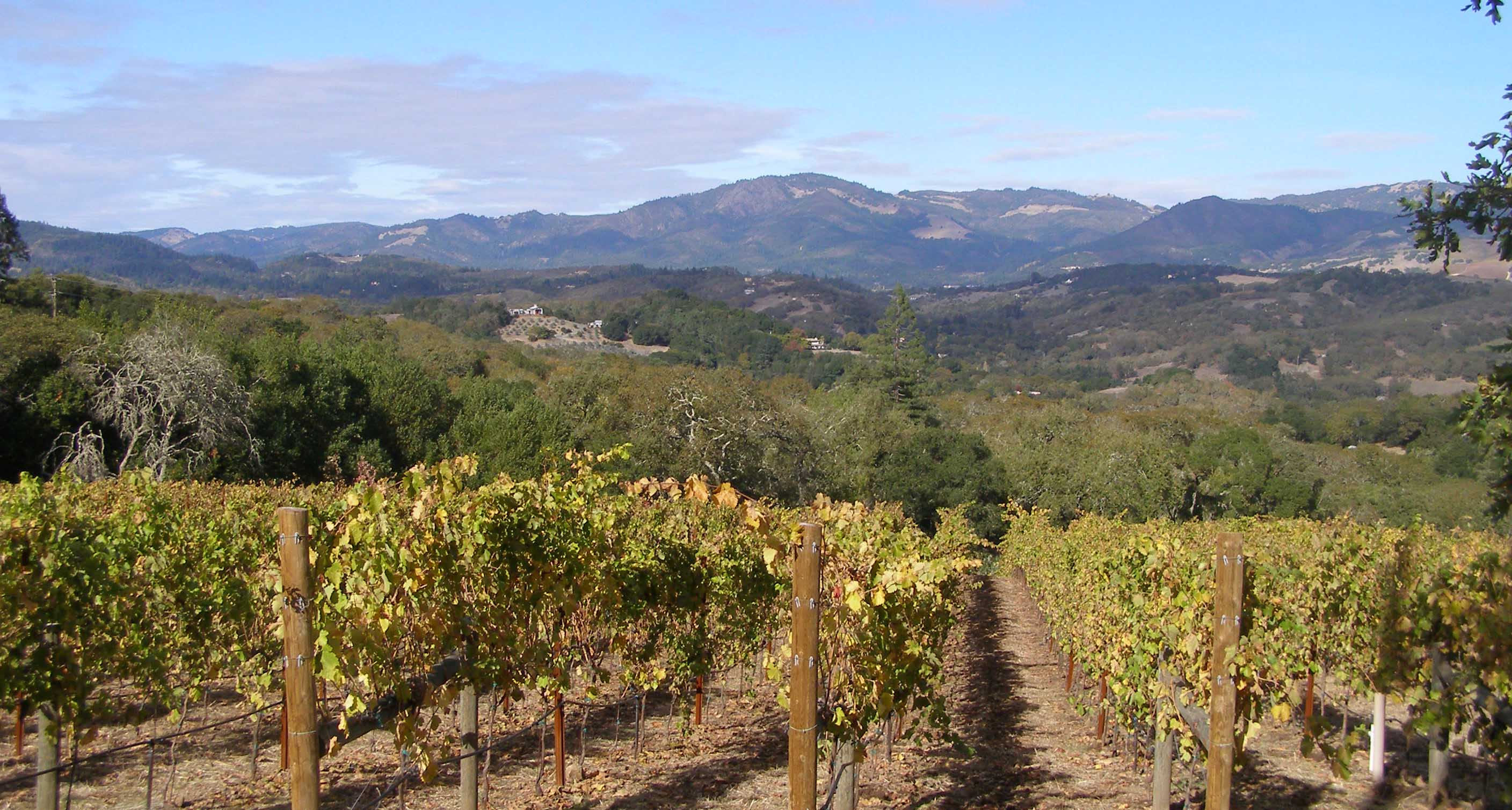
Sonoma Mountain vineyard

=== Topography and Climate ===
The Sonoma Mountain area is distinguished from surrounding areas by a "thermal belt" phenomenon common on the slopes of valleys in Mediterranean climate systems. The thermal belt phenomenon, characterized by drainage of cold air and fog from the slopes to lower elevations, is manifested by lower maximum temperatures and higher minimum temperatures, year-round, than lower elevations. In the Sonoma Valley, the lowest elevation of the thermal belt is generally considered to be around 400 feet (120 m) above mean sea level. At a certain high elevation, the thermal belt phenomenon would be expected to dissipate, due to the overall lowering of temperatures common at higher elevations. The upper point at which the thermal belt climate phenomenon is overshadowed by the effect of higher elevation has not been accurately determined on Sonoma Mountain because the steep terrain of the higher elevations makes most agricultural activities impractical. The petitioner claims that the elevated Laurel Glen Vineyards is more remote from marine influences and this accounts for the higher mean high temperature. However, the mean low temperature is consistent with other mountain temperatures, in contrast to valley floor temperatures.
The eastern boundary of the approved area is the 400-foot (122 m) contour line, the lower elevation of the thermal belt phenomenon. The western boundary is the steep terrain beginning at elevations of about 1,200 to 1,600 feet (370 to 490 m) above mean sea level. The steep terrain is a geographical feature which makes viticulture impractical. Moreover, the thermal belt phenomenon is dissipated at higher altitudes. Therefore, the western boundary uses contour lines at elevations above which viticultural activities are impractical, and above which the thermal belt phenomenon is dissipated. The petitioner claims that Laurel Glen Vineyards is more remote from marine influences and this accounts for the higher mean high temperature. However, the mean low temperature is consistent with other mountain temperatures, in contrast to valley floor temperatures.

The annual mean temperature lines drawn on the Sonoma Valley climate map indicate little difference between the Sonoma Mouuntain area and the rest of the region, but more detailed monthly high and low mean temperature data show that during the growing season the Mountain records higher lows and lower highs than valley-floor locations. High and low temperature data does not reflect the duration of the highs and lows. Thermograph charts reflect the fact that the fog which blows in from the Pacific Ocean or San Francisco Bay in the summer usually fills the valley locations first, leaving much of the Mountain fog-free. The sun's first rays tend to burn the fog off the predominantly northeastern exposure of Sonoma Mountain earlier, maximizing the hours of sunlight and warmth to which the vineyards are exposed, even though the high temperatures reached are lower than in many valley locations. This same northeastern exposure provides shelter, in the lee of the Mountain, from prevailing southwest winds. When the heat of the midday sun reaches its highest intensity, its rays are cast obliquely across the slopes fran the southwest and tempered slightly, unlike the aforementioned area in the Mayacamas Mountains on the east side of Sonoma Valley, where western exposures experience higher afternoon temperatures. The gradual ripening which characterizes grapes grown on Sonoma Mountain results in generally higher acids, lower pH readings, and maximum fruit intensity.
The rainfall lines on the petition Exhibits show that the Sonoma Mountain area receives higher average rainfall than the rest of Sonoma Valley. While the rather thin mountain topsoil cannot absorb all this rainfall in a normal year, in years of low rainfall the still relatively high level of precipitation is enough to soak Sonoma Mountain soils to field capacity by the beginning of the growing season. Non-irrigated Sonoma Mountain vineyards can, therefore, withstand dry winters; they did not suffer the debilitating effects of the 1976-77 drought, as did many dry-farming vineyards in other areas.

=== Soils ===
The Sonoma Mountain vineyards consists of the Spreckles-Felta soil association that attracted the early settlers, and continues to be primary focus of vineyard plantings. The same soil association occurs in another Sonoma Valley location, on the valley's east side, or on the western slope of the Mayacamas Mountains. The western exposure of this other area creates a micro climate significantly different from that of Sonoma Mountain. The excellence of the "red loam and light red gravelly mountain soil" on Sonoma Mountain is one characteristic which distinguishes Sonoma Mountain from much of the greater Sonoma Valley.

== See also ==
- Sonoma County wine
