= Bure Family Wines =

Winery in California

Coordinates: 38.521418°N 122.493850°W

Bure Family Wines is a winery in St. Helena, California, United States. It is a partnership between husband and wife Valeri Bure and Candace Cameron Bure and friend Joshua Peeples. Valeri has always had an interest in wine and after a back injury in 2005 that took him away from hockey, Bure was able to focus on his passion for wine and the business started after a trip to Napa Valley and meeting with Joshua Peeples at his family's winery. Luc Morlet is the winemaker for the label. Morlet works with many other high end estates in Napa Valley.

The business is categorized under Wholesale Wines and the wines are made at Chateau Boswell Winery in St. Helena, California. Much of the fruit for the wines comes from the Coombsville growing region east of the Napa Valley. Luc Morlet is the winemaker for Bure Family Wines along with many other high end estates.

The label of the wine is a tribute to Bure's great-grandfather, who was invited to be the watchmaker for the Russian Tsar. The label used on Bure Family Wine Bottles is slightly altered from Valeri's great grandfather's logo. The logo includes a hockey stick clutched in one of the bird's talons, which is a tribute to Valeri's career as a hockey player, and the sleighing horseman crest on his great-grandfather's crest is now a "B" standing for Bure.

== Wines ==
Majesty Blend, Nuit Blanche, and Duration are the wines currently produced in limited quantities.
