= Joseph E. Antonini =

American businessman

Joseph Antonini
- Born: July 13, 1941 (age 84)
- Occupation: Businessman

Joseph E. "Joe" Antonini (born July 13, 1941) is a businessman who is best known for being a former CEO of Kmart.

== Early career ==
Joseph Antonini was a retail manager at Kresge's on Union Road in Cheektowaga, New York in the late 1960s. Kresge's, a five and dime operation, eventually became Kmart and Antonini continued working for the organization.

== Education ==
Antonini attended high school at Morgantown High School.

== Kmart ==
Antonini became chairman in 1984 and CEO of Kmart in 1987. In 1990, Kmart began a major restructuring and remodeling effort while competing against Walmart, resulting in financial difficulties for Kmart. In February 1990, when Kmart announced its refurbishing program, plans were to close and relocate about 300 Kmart stores, to expand about 620 stores, and to remodel the remaining 1,250 stores. Another 150 stores were to be closed within five years. Antonini resigned from Kmart in 1995.
