= Cecil O. De Loach Jr. =

American grape-grower and winemaker

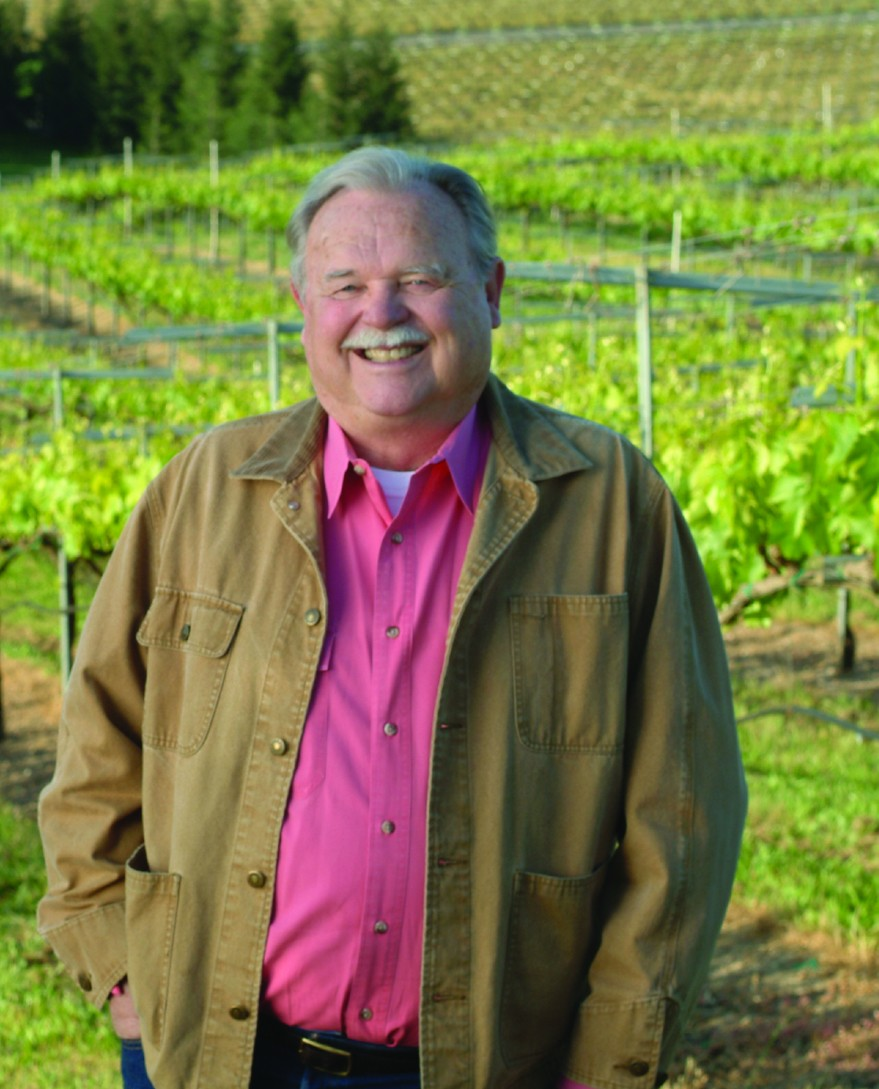
Cecil De Loach at his Los Amigos Ranch, Healdsburg, CA

Cecil O. De Loach Jr. (born September 14, 1938, Montgomery, Alabama) is a California grape-grower and winemaker in the Russian River Valley AVA who has contributed to the reputation and notoriety of Sonoma County viticulture.

== Personal history ==
Prior to his name-making career in viniculture, De Loach was a United States Marine Corps sharpshooter, a race-track photographer at Golden Gate Fields, a private pilot, and received a degree in Anthropology from San Francisco State University. During his childhood he was raised in Macon, Georgia, where he attended Lanier High School, an all-boys military school. His family subsequently moved to San Francisco in 1945. He graduated from Abraham Lincoln High School in San Francisco's Sunset District in 1956.

== Wine career ==
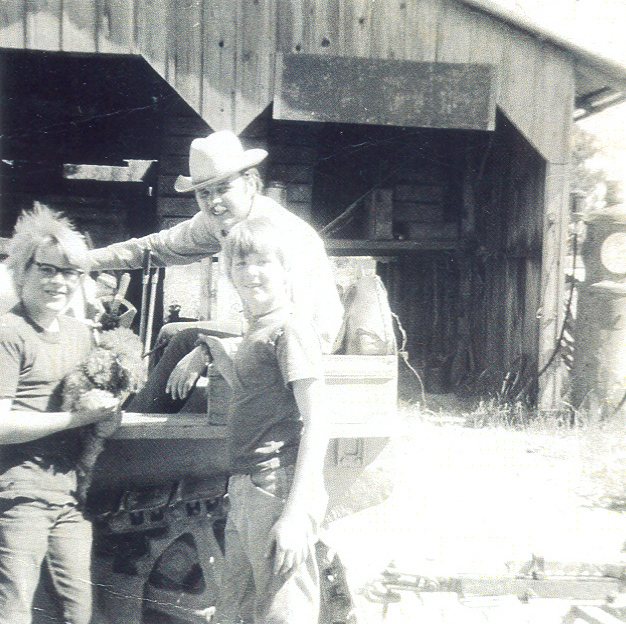
Cecil De Loach (seated on tractor) on the Barbieri Ranch circa 1970 with his two sons John (left) and Michael.

De Loach began growing grapes in 1970 when he purchased the 24-acre Barbieri Ranch at 2150 Olivet Road in Santa Rosa, CA for approximately $60,000. The Barbieri Ranch had been planted by Itilo Barbieri in 1905. De Loach purchased the old Zinfandel vineyard from Itilo's son Louis.

In 1973 he purchased his second vineyard property, 17 acres located at 1791 Olivet Road, to which he planted Pinot noir, Chardonnay, Zinfandel and Gewurztraminer. The site also comprised approximately five acres of 1940s-era mixed-grape vineyards (mostly Palomino and Golden Chasselas), an orchard of approximately 5 acres (Gravenstein apples, figs, Santa Rosa plums, peaches, French prunes, pears, walnuts), and a small sheep-shearing barn. This site became what is now De Loach Vineyards.

These early De Loach plantings combined modern ecologically sound techniques with existing local farming methods including the planting of tilth- and nutrient-producing native cover crops, rotating-row tillage, drip irrigation, micro-frost protection, permanent cover farming, and the integration of beneficial birds, animals and biological components which eventually became known as sustainable farming. De Loach's wife Christine helped draft the first California Code of Sustainable Winegrowing in 1999. De Loach Vineyards was the first farming operation in Sonoma County to be certified by Fish Friendly Farming, in 2000.

In 1975 De Loach made his first commercial wine, approximately 1000 cases of Zinfandel from the Barbieri Ranch, in a rented industrial space on the west side of Santa Rosa. While selling this wine he sought permits for a permanent winery to be built at his new vineyard on Olivet Road. The first phase of the three-phase construction was completed in 1979. In addition to Zinfandel, that year the winery produced its first Chardonnay, Pinot noir, Gewurztraminer, White-Zinfandel and Pinot noir-blanc.

De Loach had been serving as a firefighter and tillerman in the San Francisco Fire Department, which he joined in 1966. He retired from the hook & ladder company Station 10 in 1982 in order to tend to the fledgling De Loach Vineyards brand full-time. The winery grew to produce other varietals including Cabernet Sauvignon, Sauvignon blanc (Fume Blanc), Merlot, Pinot gris, Viognier, and Sangiovese, along with late harvest and reserve wines. In 1996 De Loach added a 250,000 case capacity crush facility at 2120 Olivet Road which was capable of processing in excess of 100 tons of grapes per day. Notable De Loach alumni winemakers include Bob Cabral of Three Sticks and Randy Ullom of Kendall-Jackson Winery.

During his tenure as Founder, President and Winemaster at De Loach Vineyards, De Loach served as president of the Sonoma County Wineries Association, now Sonoma County Vintners the Sonoma County Vintners Coop, and the Russian River Wine Road, now simply Wine Road. He created his eponymous De Loach Vineyards brand along with several other labels still in production including Hartman Lane Vineyards and Winery, Sonoma Cuvee, and Hook & Ladder, which was originally a port offering under De Loach's "OFS" (Our Finest Selection) reserve banner in the 1990s.

At its peak De Loach Vineyards produced 250,000 cases, and owned or leased over 1000 planted vineyard acres in the Russian River Valley. Notable single vineyards included Papera Ranch, Pelletti Ranch, Gambogi Ranch, Saitone Ranch and Barbieri Ranch, which were all zinfandel plantings from the late 1800s and early 1900s.

== Sale of the De Loach Vineyards brand ==
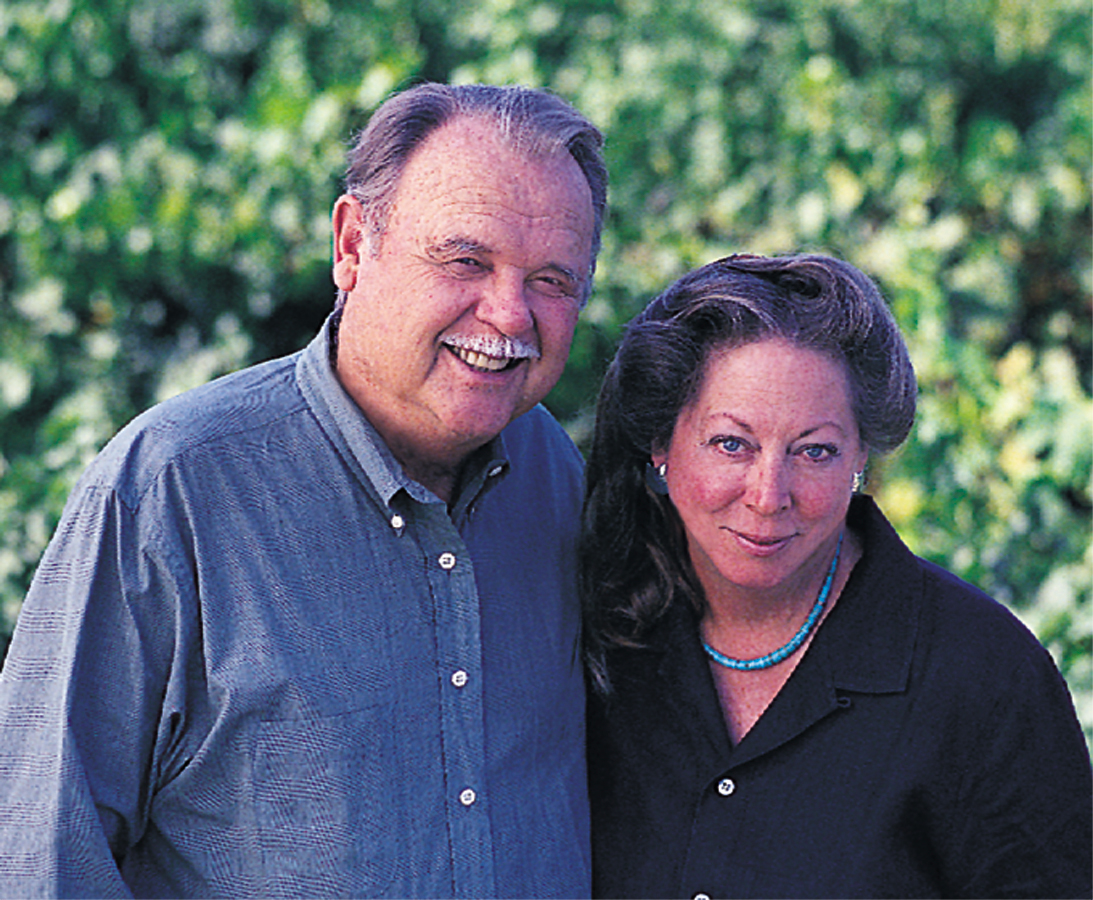
Cecil and Christine De Loach at their eponymous winery in the nineties, a time of rapid growth in the California wine industry.

In November 2003 De Loach sold the De Loach Vineyards brand and the original winery site to Boisset Family Estates for $17.5 million just prior to emerging from an 8-month Chapter 11 (protection from creditors) bankruptcy proceeding pending reorganization. Cecil De Loach and his farming company, Sweetwater Land & Cattle Company, retained ownership of the majority of his vineyard holdings.

== Latest projects ==
In December 2004 De Loach started C & C Wine Company, a custom-crush winery with offices at The Saitone Ranch at 2027 Olivet Road, a zinfandel vineyard which was planted in 1895. In the same month De Loach sold the 250,000 case capacity crush facility at 2120 Olivet Road to Derek Benham of Sonoma Wine Company, now Purple Wine + Spirits, for $6.2 million.

In May 2005, Joe Anderson and Mary Dewane purchased Hartman Lane Vineyards and Winery from Cecil De Loach for $3.6 million. Hartman Lane was De Loach's 18-acre Pinot noir vineyard and winery facility, which the new owners renamed Benovia Winery. Prior to De Loach's ownership the site was originally home to celebrated Pinot noir winemaker Merry Edwards' winery The Merry Vintners. Hook & Ladder Winery continues to produce the Hartman Lane Pinot noir label.

== Hook & Ladder Winery ==
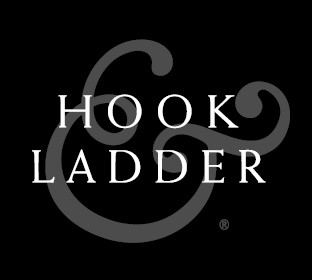
Hook and Ladder logo

Hook & Ladder Winery is a family-owned and operated wine producer located at 2134 Olivet Road (Santa Rosa, California) in the Russian River Valley of Sonoma County, founded by Cecil De Loach and his wife Christine, in 2005. The winemaker is Cecil De Loach's grandson Jason De Loach, formerly cellar master at Dutton-Goldfield Winery and Balletto Vineyards. Michael De Loach served as president until October, 2016; prior to Hook & Ladder he was president of De Loach Vineyards.

As an estate producer, Hook & Ladder sustainably grows all of its own grapes, makes all of its own wines, and bottles the wine on its premises. The winery sources its grapes from Sweetwater Land & Cattle Co., a grape farming operation owned by Cecil De Loach, which comprises 375 acres of vineyard in Russian River Valley.

The winery produces blends from a variety of grapes including Cabernet Sauvignon, Merlot, Cabernet Franc, Sangiovese, Zinfandel, Petite Sirah, Alicante Bouschet and Carignane. The winery also produces a full range of varietal wines including Cabernet Sauvignon, Merlot, Chardonnay, Pinot noir, Sauvignon blanc, Zinfandel and Gewurztraminer. The total annual case production is approximately 25,000 cases. In addition Hook & Ladder produces an extra virgin olive oil from their Los Amigos Ranch in Healdsburg, CA. Hook & Ladder owns four other wine brands: Hartman Lane Vineyards & Winery, Tuscan Ridge, Sweetwater, and Four Rows.
