= Jean-Charles Boisset =

French vintner and winery owner (born 1969)

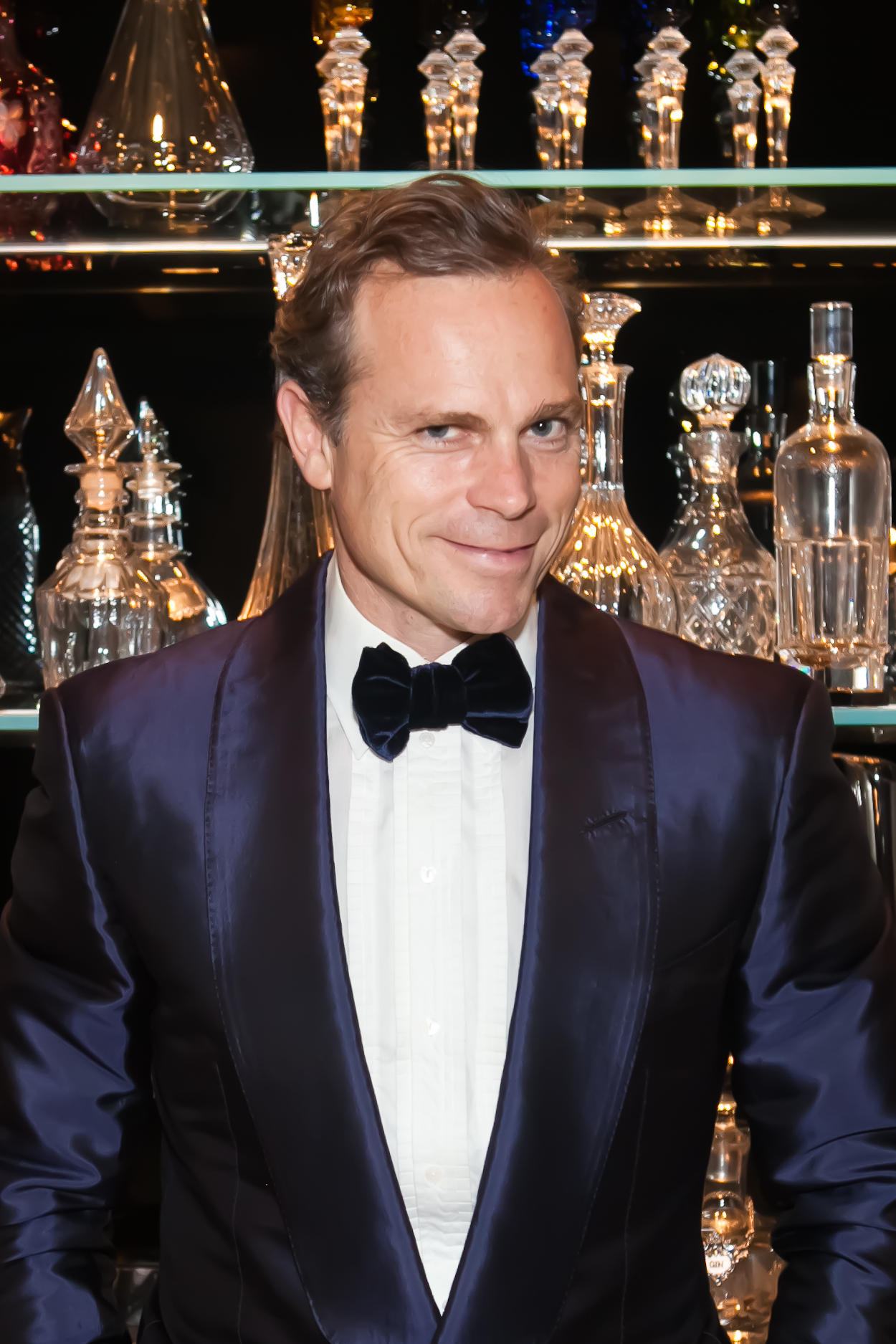
- Born: 1969 (age 56–57); Vougeot, France
- Occupation: President of the Boisset Collection
- Spouse: Gina Gallo (2009-)

Jean-Charles Boisset (born 1969) is a French vintner and the proprietor of the Boisset Collection, which operates 28 wineries in California, France, and Canada.

Boisset comes from a viticultural family. His father and mother founded a winery in Burgundy, France, in 1961. When a young Boisset visited Buena Vista Winery, in California, with his sister and grandparents, the 11 year old Boisset shared with his family that he wanted to live in the United States one day.

Boisset moved to California in the early nineties and purchased his first winery, Lyeth Estates and in 1999 he co-founded Domaine de la Vougeraie with his sister, Nathalie. In 2003, Boisset purchased DeLoach Vineyards in California's Russian River Valley AVA, followed by Raymond Vineyards, located in Napa Valley, California, in 2009 and Buena Vista Winery, located in Sonoma, California, in 2011.

== Early life ==
Jean-Charles Boisset is the son of Jean-Claude and Claudine Boisset, who founded their family winery, Jean-Claude Boisset, Burgundy, France in 1961. In 1964, the winery acquired its first vineyard, Les Evocelles in the Gevrey-Chambertin commune. Boisset was born in Vougeot, France in 1969.

When Boisset was seven years old, he tried two wines from Burgundy: a 1969 Clos de Vougeot and a 1964 Bonnes Mares. He would eventually name a wine under his JCB label "No. 7," as a tribute to the first time he tried wine.

Boisset's grandparents were part of the French Resistance and his grandfather would go on to fight in World War II. His grandparents' involvement in the war led to their having a strong admiration for US citizens, and as a child, Boisset remembers his grandparents telling him stories about the US soldiers who helped free France. His grandparents encouraged him to visit the United States and to dream to live there one day.

At the age of 11, Boisset and his sister Nathalie visited the United States in 1981 for the first time with his grandparents. They visited California, specifically Monterey, San Francisco, and Sonoma. Their grandparents took them on a tour of Buena Vista Winery and later that day, Boisset's grandparents let him and his sister try a Buena Vista Winery Chardonnay that they had purchased during the winery visit. Regarding that wine, Boisset said "I was transfixed - such pure, elegant, and tropical notes that we did not know in Burgundy!" After their visit to the winery, Boisset suggested to his sister that he hoped to one day own a winery in California. In 2011, he would purchase Buena Vista.

As a young man, Boisset was less interested in wine than other pursuits. He almost became a professional footballer. He studied business and finance at the University of London, followed by graduate studies at the University of California, Los Angeles. He earned a Master of Business Administration from the University of San Francisco.

== Life in wine ==
Boisset was exposed to the wine industry at an early age. He was raised in his family's home near Clos de Vougeot and spent considerable time in the family's vineyards. In the early nineties, the Boisset family sought to close the office of Boisset America (now called the Boisset Collection) in San Francisco. Boisset chose to operate the office, relocating to San Francisco. Shortly thereafter, Boisset purchased his first California winery, Lyeth Estates. In 1999, Boisset and his sister, Nathalie Boisset, created Domaine de la Vougeraie from the family's estate in Côte de Nuits and Côte de Beaune. In 2003, Boisset purchased DeLoach Vineyards in California's Russian River Valley AVA, followed by Raymond Vineyards, located in Napa Valley, California, in 2009 and Buena Vista Winery, located in Sonoma, California, in 2011.

In total, the Boisset Collection includes 24 wineries in Burgundy, Beaujolais, the Rhône Valley, the South of France, Napa, Sonoma and Monterey, California, and Quebec. The family's estates are certified biodynamic and/or organic wine.

Boisset is interested in small production wines that are made utilizing Burgundian winemaking techniques, including the use of pigeage, open-top fermentation, and terroir. His business style has been described as being a "more consumer-driven, New World approach." As a wine drinker, Boisset has cited Pinot Noir as his favorite varietal and on his death bed he would drink a 2006 and a 2003 Clos du Vougeot Blanc.

=== Lyeth Estates ===
Lyeth Estates was the first American winery purchased by Boisset.

=== Domaine de la Vougeraie ===
Boisset and his sister Nathalie founded Domaine de la Vougeraie in 1999, consolidating their family's vineyards in Burgundy. This consolidation included vineyards in the Clos de Vougeot. They also focused on maintaining, or introducing, sustainable farming to each vineyard. The same year as the founding of Domaine de la Vougeraie, Boisset made his first wine, working with 14 other people to process the grapes by hand. He produced two wines: a Clos du Vougeot Blanc and La Montée Rouge.

=== DeLoach Vineyards ===
Located in the Russian River Valley AVA, DeLoach Vineyards was founded in 1975. Boisset acquired DeLoach Vineyards in 2003. DeLoach produces Chardonnay, Pinot Noir and Zinfandel in the Russian River Valley AVA in Sonoma County. The purchase has been described as a "tribute," to Burgundy. Boisset has described the Russian River Valley as "the next Côte d'Or." Brian Maloney serves as Director of Winemaking at DeLoach Vineyards.

=== Raymond Vineyards ===
In 2009, Boisset purchased Raymond Vineyards. The winery was founded in 1971 by Roy Raymond, Sr. and his two sons, Walter and Roy. Raymond's first vintage was in 1974. In 1989, Kirin Holdings purchased the winery, with the Raymond family still managing the property and production. Boisset purchased the property from Kirin. Stephanie Putnam was hired as Director of Winemaker in 2010. Putnam collaborates with Consulting Winemaker Philippe Melka to produce Raymond Vineyards wines.

Under Boisset's leadership, Raymond became a biodynamic producer. On-site is a 2-acre exhibition about biodynamic farming, called the Theater of Nature. The self-guided exhibit is the largest exhibit showcasing biodynamic practices in the region. It aims to teach guests about how biodynamic farming impacts Raymond Vineyards' wines via a five act theater-inspired exhibition. The Theater of Nature's gardens produce biodynamic and organic produce. The winery is also operated on 100% solar power.

Additionally, Raymond is known for the many "experiences," offered to guests, including the "Crystal Cellar," which features mannequins hanging from the ceiling, Baccarat crystal and silver made by Christofle. The "red room," has a burlesque-style decor, with red velvet. The winery also has a dog friendly space named after Boisset's own dog, Frenchie.

In 2012, Raymond Vineyards earned Wine Enthusiast "American Winery of the Year" award. In 2014, the winery was named by Great Wine Capitals as the Regional Winner for "Innovative Wine Tourism Experiences." Raymond Vineyards was named "Best Unique Tasting Experience" by CellarPass in 2014. The North Bay Bohemian named Raymond Vineyards the "Best Winetasting Room" in Napa Valley in 2015 and 2016 and for having the best Cabernet Sauvignon.

==== Collaboration with John Legend ====
In late 2015, Raymond introduced LVE: Legend Vineyard Exclusive, a label featuring a Napa Valley Chardonnay and a Napa Valley Cabernet Sauvignon created by Boisset, Stephanie Putnam, and singer-songwriter John Legend. In 2015, Legend performed at Auction Napa Valley, performing as part of Raymond Vineyards' auction lot, which helped to raise $850,000 for Napa Valley charities. The lot included six double magnums of LVE, dinner, and a private concert by Legend at Boisset's Napa Valley home. In 2016, the collaboration between Raymond Vineyards and Legend was awarded the inaugural "Wine & Culture" award by Wine Enthusiast.

=== Buena Vista Winery ===
Boisset purchased Buena Vista Winery, the oldest commercial winery in California, in 2011. It was the first American winery that Boisset had visited, when he was 11 years old. Upon purchasing Buena Vista, Boisset launched a major renovation of the property, which had suffered from disrepair. The historic champagne cellars, built in 1864, almost collapsed and needed to be repaired. Boisset hired contractors, including preservationists to assist with the renovations. The renovations completed, the winery began producing wine in the original cellars for the first time in 2015. Additionally, the winery has a wine tool museum and houses a "Bubble Lounge," where guests can taste and purchase Boisset's JCB sparkling wine.

=== JCB by Jean-Charles Boisset ===
Boisset has his own wine label, JCB. Each wine in the portfolio is named after a number, i.e. No. 3 JCB, similar to Chanel No. 5. JCB No. 39 is named after the year Boisset's grandparents were married. The label produces still and sparkling wine from France, mainly Burgundy and Provence, California, specifically Napa and Sonoma. JCB 47 is a wine created with Fratelli Wines in the honour of India's independence in 1947

==== JCB Tasting Lounge ====
A tasting lounge for JCB wines is located at DeLoach Winery, Raymond Vineyards and Buena Vista Winery. In 2015, JCB opened the JCB by Jean-Charles Boisset Tasting Lounge at the Ritz-Carlton San Francisco. Located in a room adjacent to the concierge desk, the lounge has a capacity of 10 guests and serves wine flights and food and wine pairings from the hotel's Parallel 37 restaurant. The lounge offers JCB wines and additional wines from Buena Vista and Domaine de la Vougeraie. The space has been described as an "opulent French parlor," and "over the top," due to the decor, which includes purple velvet couches, gold fringe stools, and leopard print carpet. Additionally, the lounge sells Goyard handbags, Baccarat products, and Boisset's collection of unisex brooches.

==== Tasting Salon and Atelier by JCB ====
In 2016, Boisset opened the JCB Tasting Salon and Atelier by JCB in Yountville. Like the San Francisco-based lounge, wines are available in three different flights, with bottles available for take away purchase. The lounge has a digital touch table designed by Ideum, that guides guests through wine tastings and builds a wine profile based on guests preferred wines. The lounge is decorated with leopard print couches, and cheetah print stools. Mirrors framed in gold hang from the ceiling, along with Baccarat chandeliers. It sells luxury goods, including Baccarat crystal, Christofle silver, and Bernardaud porcelain. Additionally, it sells high end art books. The Atelier sells high end foods, including rare cheeses, meats, foie gras, smoked salmon and caviar. The Atelier is decorated with a Baccarat chandelier and gold leaf covered shelves. It was named the 2nd best place to shop in Napa Valley by USA Today and a cross between "Fifth Avenue and Champs-Elysees".

==== Surrealist ====
Under the JCB label, Boisset also produces The Surrealist, a Napa Valley red blend wine, decanters, and jewelry in one package. A piece of jewelry is used on the bottle in lieu of a traditional wine label, reflecting old world wine necklaces, and a Baccarat crystal stopper transforms the bottle into a decanter. A set, which includes a bottle of wine, the wine decanter and a brooch costs $500. The bottle can be reused as a decanter after it is emptied. The wine is a blend of Petit Verdot and Cabernet Sauvignon from eastern Napa Valley and St. Helena.

=== Alternative wine packaging ===
Boisset has acknowledged that while glass wine bottles have "romance and aesthetic," and the importance of glass for aging wine. However, he believes that alternative packaging "helps to improve value, ecology and convenience." Boisset is interested in packaging that reduces carbon footprints while still providing a quality wine experience, especially in places where glass bottles are not allowed.

As the president of Boisset Collection, he is credited with the creation of French Rabbit, a wine brand that uses Tetrapaks instead of wine bottles. The brand sells approximately 150,000 cases a year in the United States and Canada. He also introduced Yellow Jersey, a wine brand sold in plastic bottles, using wine from Vin de Pays d'Oc. In 2011, Boisset introduced "barrel-to-barrel," packaging at Raymond Vineyards and DeLoach. Similar to a boxed wine concept, 10- to 3-liter bags filled with wine can be placed in reusable barrels for restaurant/bar or home use. The empty bags weigh 99% lighter than a case of empty wine bottles, thus more affordable to ship, and the wine lasts longer.

Boisset has also introduced a Beaujolais in an aluminum container called Mommessin. The wine is meant to be drunk chilled and the bottle turns blue when it is at the right drinking temperature. It takes 10 minutes to chill, versus 30 minutes in a glass bottle. He is also credited with being one of the first Burgundian vintners to use screwcaps instead of corks.

== Personal life ==
Boisset met Gina Gallo, winemaker at Gallo Family Vineyards, in 2006 at a tasting room in Bordeaux. They were married in 2009 at the Fairmont San Francisco. The couple have twin girls, born in 2011.

In 2011, Boisset and Gallo purchased the former home of Robert Mondavi in Napa Valley. The family also has an apartment in the Nob Hill neighborhood of San Francisco and a home in Burgundy in France. The family travels to Burgundy several times a year, to spend time with Boisset's family and so their daughters can learn about the French culture.

Despite both of their roles in the wine industry, Boisset and Gallo do not officially collaborate on wine projects.

== Achievements ==
Since 2007, Boisset has been named to Decanters Power List. In 2008, he was named "Innovator of the Year" by Wine Enthusiast. In 2013, he was named one of the "20 most admired people in the North American wine industry," by Vineyard & Winery Management. That same year, Boisset was awarded the first ever recipient of the French-American Partnership of Excellence Award awarded by the French-American Foundation. In 2014, Boisset and Gallo were awarded the "Global Entrepreneurship Award" by John F. Kennedy University. That same year, he was the 2014 Jefferson Award Honoree from the Pennsylvania Academy of Fine Arts. The following year, in 2015, Boisset was named an Honorary Chair of Sonoma Valley Wine Country Weekend. In 2015 and 2016, he was named to Haute Living's San Francisco's Haute 100 list.

== Style ==
Boisset's fashion sense has been described as "theatrical," "unpredictable," "flamboyant" and "fantastical." He wears designer suits and jackets by Tom Ford, Gucci, and Lanvin. Additionally, he is an enthusiast of Louboutin shoes. His red socks have been described as his "trademark." He was voted "best dressed," in a 2014 reader's poll by the Nob Hill Gazette.
