= Benovia Winery =

Coordinates: 38.4771°N 122.8022°W

- Location: Santa Rosa, California, USA
- Appellation: Russian River Valley AVA
- Founded: 2005
- Key people: Joe Anderson, Proprietor; Mary Dewane, Proprietor; Mike Sullivan, Co-owner & Winemaker; Ed Thralls, General Manager
- Cases/yr: 6,000
- Known for: Cohn Estate Pinot Noir, Tilton Hill Estate Pinot Noir, Martaella Estate Pinot Noir
- Varietals: Pinot noir, Chardonnay, Zinfandel, Grenache varietal5 = Cabernet Sauvignon
- Distribution: limited
- Tasting: By Appointment Only
- Website: www.benoviawinery.com

Benovia Winery is a family-owned producer of Pinot noir, Chardonnay, and Zinfandel wines in Santa Rosa, California. Founded in 2005 by Joe Anderson and Mary Dewane, Benovia Winery farms three estate vineyards which total 71.67 acres (290,000 m^{2}) and are located in the Russian River Valley AVA and Sonoma Coast AVA in Sonoma County. To supplement the fruit it harvests each year, Benovia purchases additional grapes from two sites farmed by the Martinelli family. Benovia's winemaker, Mike Sullivan, is also co-owner of the winery. Benovia wines are produced and bottled at the winery's winemaking facilities at the Martaella Estate Vineyard in the Russian River Valley AVA. Annual production is approximately 6,000 cases. Benovia wines are sold direct to customers, as well as distributed to restaurants and other retailers for resale.

== History ==
In February 2003, husband and wife team Joe Anderson and Mary Dewane purchased the Cohn Estate Vineyard, a 40-year-old Pinot noir and Zinfandel producing property (17.6 planted acres) west of Healdsburg, California which is part of a larger 55-acre (220,000 m^{2}) ranch formerly owned by Arnold and Tekla Cohn. In May 2005, Anderson and Dewane purchased Hartman Lane Vineyards and Winery, an 18-acre (73,000 m^{2}) property and winery facility in the Russian River Valley AVA from Cecil De Loach, the former owner of De Loach Vineyards. Also in 2005, Mike Sullivan joined Benovia as part-owner and winemaker. In 2008, 40 more acres adjoining the property were purchased. Today the Martaella Estate Vineyard encompasses 58 acres (230,000 m^{2}), 42 acres of which are planted to vine, including 8.5 acres (34,000 m^{2}) planted to Pinot noir in 1997. Five acres were replanted in 2008 also to Pinot noir. New vineyard plantings at the winery in 2009 and 2010 include 21.3 acres (86,000 m^{2}) of Pinot noir, 6.01 acres (24,300 m^{2}) of Chardonnay. A 16-acre (65,000 m^{2}) property just outside Freestone, California was also purchased in 2008 and is currently planted to 11.76 acres (47,600 m^{2}) of Pinot noir and named Tilton Hill Estate Vineyard.

Benovia began producing wine in 2005. Its first commercial release was the 2006 vintage. The winery's name Benovia is a combination of the founders' fathers' first names—Ben Dewane and Novian Anderson.

== People ==
Mike Sullivan (Winemaker) – Sullivan grew up in Sonoma County and attended Fresno State, earning a degree in fermentation science. He joined Benovia in 2005. Prior to Benovia, Sullivan was winemaker at Hartford Family Winery. In 2002, he was named “Wine Personality of the Year” by [Robert M. Parker, Jr.] in the Wine Advocate and “Winemaker of the Year” by Ronn Wiegand of the magazine Restaurant Wine.

Joe Anderson (Founder and Co-owner) – Prior to establishing Benovia, Anderson was co-founder and CEO of Schaller Anderson a managed healthcare provider based in Phoenix, Arizona. Anderson sold Schaller Anderson to Aetna healthcare company in 2007, and stepped down as CEO in March, 2008.

== Benovia Winery Estate Vineyards ==
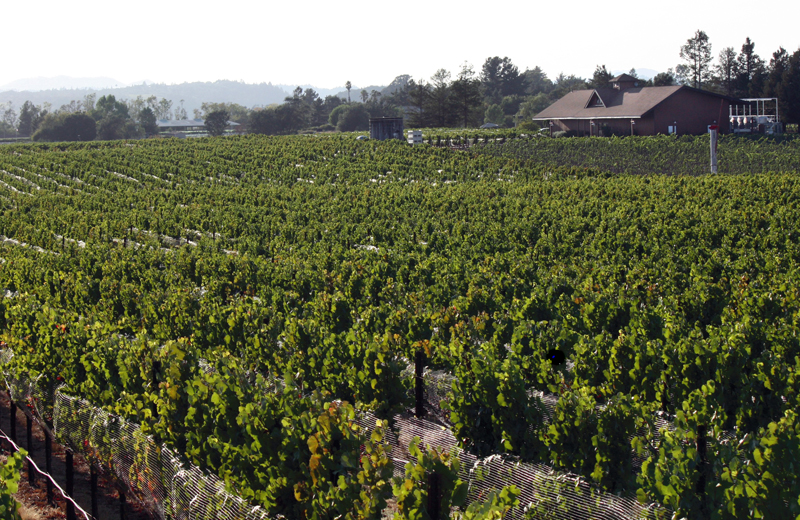
Benovia Winery with Martaella Vineyards in foreground.

=== Cohn Estate Vineyard ===
Located off Westside Road west of Healdsburg, California, the Cohn Estate Vineyard was established in 1970. Previous harvests from this site have produced single vineyard wines for Williams-Selyem and Kosta Browne. The Pinot noir vineyard is 8.83 acres (35,700 m^{2}) and planted with clones of unknown origin. The 8.77-acre (35,500 m^{2}) Zinfandel vineyard is located just below the Pinot noir section. The vineyard is considered Region II on the Winkler scale, with maritime influences. The soil type is predominantly Josephine loam. In 2006, Benovia completed extensive pruning of the vineyard and has since become a CCOF Certified Organic vineyard.

=== Martaella Estate Vineyards ===
Martaella Estate borders Benovia Winery's winemaking facilities in the Russian River Valley AVA, specifically within an area known as the Laguna de Santa Rosa. Martaella experiences heavy maritime influences with frequent early morning fog throughout the growing season. Daytime temperatures rarely rise above 85 °F (29 °C), while nights often dip into the low 50s °F (low 10s °C). The 58-acre (230,000 m^{2}) property currently grows 40.81 acres (165,200 m^{2}) of grape vines in various stages of development.

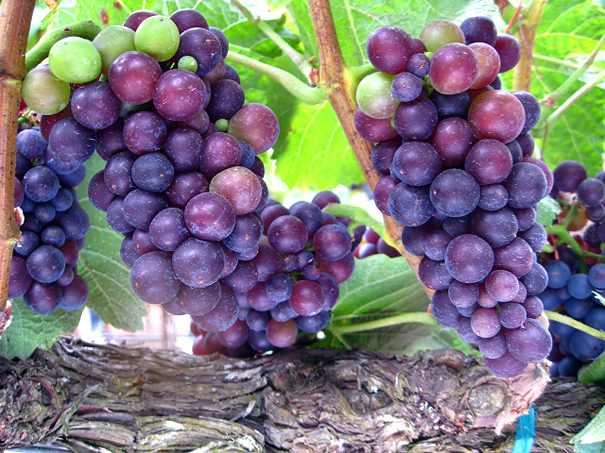
Pinot noir grapes ripening in Martaella Vineyards

When first purchased, Martaella was planted with 13.5 acres (55,000 m^{2}) of Pommard clone Pinot noir. Benovia introduced more clonal diversity by replanting 5 acres (20,000 m^{2}) of the original vineyard with Calera and Dijon 828 clones of Pinot noir, with the new vines planted at a higher density using 4-by-4-foot (1.2 by 1.2 m) spacing, or about 2,700 vines per acre (6,700/ha).

The acquisition of a former apple orchard and horse ranch just north of the winery in 2009 allowed Benovia to plant an additional 18 acres (73,000 m^{2}) of vines. To encourage soil uniformity, the winery installed a network of subsoil drains in 2008. After a site evaluation, Benovia chose to plant with a high-density vine count; planting vines four feet apart with five-foot (1.5 m) rows. The winery chose to plant 21.3 acres (86,000 m^{2}) of Pinot noir on devigorated rootstock (420A) with a diverse clonal mix. Benovia also planted 6 acres (24,000 m^{2}) with an heirloom clone of Chardonnay chosen for its low yields and concentrated flavors.

=== Tilton Hill Estate Vineyard ===
The Tilton Hill Estate Vineyard is the winery's coldest planting with its location just a few miles from the Pacific Ocean on a ridge top that overlooks Freestone, California in the Sonoma Coast AVA. During summer, the ridge lines nearest the coast are cooled by the ocean breezes that precede the marine layer in this part of Sonoma County. Temperatures at Tilton Hill rarely rises above 75 °F (24 °C) during the summer, but can cool to the low 50s °F (low 10s °C) at night. The vineyard consists of uniform sandy loam soil known as ‘Goldridge’. This shallow and well-drained soil is ideal for growing Pinot noir in this coastal climate. The grape vines are planted at a very high density, with vines spaced four feet (1.2 m) apart with five-foot (1.5 m) rows. This property was planted with 11.76 acres (47,600 m^{2}) low vigor rootstock 420A and heirloom and Dijon selections of Pinot noir in 2009.

== Grower Partner Vineyards ==
Benovia sources additional grapes to supplement its estate-grown fruit from Sonoma County's Martinelli family.

=== Martinelli Vineyards ===
The Martinelli Winery has grown fruit in Sonoma County since 1896. The Martinelli vineyards are farmed by Lee Martinelli, Sr., and his sons Lee, Jr. and George. Benovia Winery's La Pommeraie Chardonnay and La Pommeraie Pinot noir are produced from the Zio Tony Ranch, a Russian River Valley AVA vineyard farmed by George Martinelli located on Frei Road near the town of Graton, California. The vineyard experiences very cool temperatures with many foggy mornings. Benovia Winery's Three Sisters Chardonnay is produced with grapes from the Martinelli's Three Sisters Vineyard located in the Sonoma Coast AVA on the 3rd ridge in from the Pacific Ocean.

== Winemaking ==
The process of creating Benovia’s Pinot noir wines begins with handpicking the fruit during harvest. Workers clip the grapes from the vines in bunches, collect the grape clusters in bins, and transport the fruit to a sorting table. Each cluster is inspected by hand at the sorting table prior to the automated destemming process which separates the berries from the stems. A second sorting area following destemming allows workers to inspect the individual berries and discard unsuitable fruit. The grapes are then transferred to small, open-top fermentors as gently as possible to minimize fruit damage. After a pre-fermentation maceration of five to eight days, the indigenous yeast encourages the longer process of malolactic fermentation. The wines then spend 14 to 16 months aging in French oak barrels before being transferred to the bottling line at Benovia. The winery's Chardonnay grapes follow a similar process. After hand-sorting, the whole clusters are transferred directly to the wine press. Whole cluster pressing helps minimize the amount of malic acid and tannins that naturally exist in the skins, seeds and stems from entering the wine. After settling, the resulting juice (called “must”) is moved to French oak barrels to ferment at a cool temperature for approximately four to six weeks. The barrels are inoculated for malolactic fermentation, and the lees are stirred weekly until the process is complete. This method helps the malolactic fermentation, integrates the new oak, and builds body and structure in the wine.
