= Central High School (Macon, Georgia) =

Public high school in Macon, Georgia, United States

Location
- 2155 Napier Avenue; Macon, Georgia 31204; United States; 32.83727°N 83.65563°W

Information
- Type: Public magnet high school
- Motto: "We Lead; It Can Be Done"
- Established: 1870 (156 years ago)
- School district: Bibb County School District
- CEEB code: 111960
- Principal: Dr. Keturah Reese
- Teaching staff: 55.20 (FTE)
- Enrollment: 876 (2023–2024)
- Student to teacher ratio: 15.87
- Colors: Orange, blue, white
- Athletics: Major sports include football, basketball, baseball, soccer, and band
- Mascot: Chargers
- Website: central.bcsdk12.net

Central High School, also known as Central-Macon, Central-Bibb, and Central Fine Arts and International Baccalaureate Magnet High School, is a high school in Macon, Georgia, United States, serving students in grades 9–12. It is a unit of the Bibb County School District.

== Athletics ==
As of the 2023-24/2024–25 season

Type	Competition	State titles	Season(s)
Boys' sports	Baseball	2	1946, 1965
Boys' sports	Basketball	16	1922, 1925, 1926, 1927, 1928, 1933, 1934, 1936, 1938, 1939, 1940, 1942, 1945, 1948, 1950, 1951
Boys' sports	Football	3	1947, 1948, 1975
Boys' sports	Golf	2	1943, 1944
Boys' sports	Riflery	4	1975, 1976, 1977, 1978
Boys' sports	Soccer	0	
Boys' sports	Tennis	0	
Boys' sports	Track & Field	2	1951, 1952
Boys' sports	Wrestling	0	
Girls' sports	Basketball	0	
Girls' sports	Competitive Cheerleading	0	
Girls' sports	Flag Football	0	
Girls' sports	Soccer	0	
Girls' sports	Softball	0	
Girls' sports	Tennis	0	
Girls' sports	Track & Field	0	
Girls' sports	Volleyball	0	

Key:

School Boys' Record
School Girls' Record

== Notable alumni ==
This section also includes notable alumni from Lanier and Miller High Schools, which combined in 1970 to form the present Central High School.

- Samaria (Mitcham) Bailey, first American female of African descent to attend the school; went on to be an entrepreneur; CEO of Med Tech Services, Inc.
- John Morrison Birch, missionary considered by some to be the first victim of the Cold War; the conservative John Birch Society, formed 13 years after his death, is named in his honor
- Neil Callaway, offensive line coach for the USC Trojans
- Jay Carson, advisor to politicians such as Bill Clinton, Hillary Clinton, and Howard Dean
- Manley Lanier "Sonny" Carter, Jr., astronaut and soccer player
- Bill Cowsert, Georgia State Senator, 46th District and former Majority Leader
- Cecil O. De Loach, Jr., winemaker, viticulturalist, founder of De Loach Vineyards, Sonoma County, California
- Tony Gilbert, University of Georgia and NFL football player for the Atlanta Falcons
- Watts Gunn, golfer
- Bob Hendley, former professional baseball player (Milwaukee Braves, San Francisco Giants, Chicago Cubs, New York Mets)
- Sasha Hutchings, musical theatre actress, singer, and dancer; was in the original Broadway cast of Hamilton
- Roger Jackson, football player
- Isaac Jackson, football player Kansas State University, Cincinnati Bengals
- Tom Johnson, former president of CNN and the Los Angeles Times
- Ellamae Ellis League, architect from Macon, first woman FAIA from Georgia
- Carrie Preston, actress (My Best Friend's Wedding, The Legend of Bagger Vance, Person of Interest)
- Bernard Ramsey, Merrill Lynch executive and philanthropist; largest single donor to University of Georgia
- Theron Sapp, University of Georgia and NFL football player
- General Robert Lee Scott, Jr., author of the book God is My Co-Pilot, later made into a film of the same name
- Vernon "Catfish" Smith, All-American football player at the University of Georgia
- Hamp Tanner, football player
- J.T. Thomas, Florida State and NFL football player for the Pittsburgh Steelers
- Ronnie Thompson, first Republican to be elected mayor of Macon; served from 1967 to 1975; gospel singer
- Coot Veal, former professional baseball player (Detroit Tigers, Washington Senators, Pittsburgh Pirates)
- Alan Walden, co-founder of Capricorn Records; former manager of Lynyrd Skynyrd and Outlaws
- Phil Walden, co-founder of Capricorn Records; manager of Otis Redding and The Allman Brothers Band
