= Domaine de la Vougeraie =

Burgundy wine producer in Premeaux-Prissey, France

- Location: Premeaux-Prissey, Burgundy, France
- Coordinates: 47.112364°N 4.934766°E
- Wine region: Côte-d'Or
- Founded: 1999 (26 years ago)
- First vintage: 1999 (26 years ago)
- Key people: Jean-Claude Boisset, Jean-Charles Boisset
- Parent company: Boisset Family Estates
- Known for: Vougeot Premier Cru Le Clos Blanc de Vougeot, Vougeot Le Clos du Prieuré White, Vougeot Le Clos du Prieuré Red
- Varietals: Pinot noir, Chardonnay
- Website: http://www.domainedelavougeraie.com

Domaine de la Vougeraie is a Burgundy wine producer in the town of Premeaux-Prissey, France. They produce wine from vineyards in the Côte de Nuits and the Côte de Beaune.

== History ==
The domaine was founded in 1999 when Jean-Charles Boisset decided to consolidate what he considered the best 86.4 acres (35.0 ha) of his family's vineyards into one domaine.

The vineyards that became Domaine de la Vougeraie were acquired by the Boissets over a nearly 50-year period, beginning with a 5 hectares (12 acres) plot north of Gevrey-Chambertin in 1964. Over time, the family acquired both vineyard plots and entire domaines, making Boisset Family Estates the largest producer of wine in Burgundy.

The original winemaker at the domaine was Pascal Marchand, who turned winemaking duties over to Pierre Vincent in 2006.

== Vineyards, viticulture, and winemaking ==
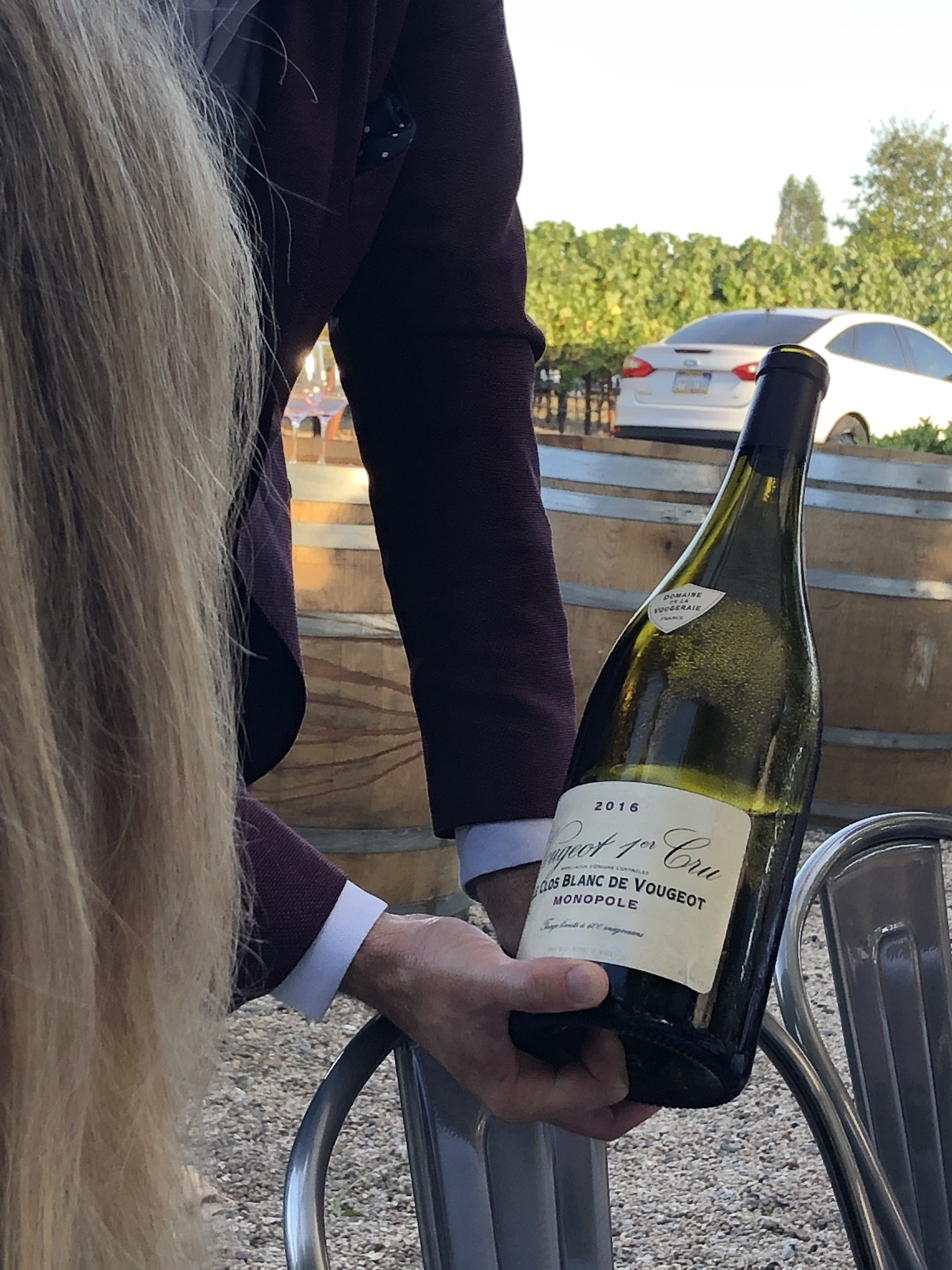
A bottle of 2016 Vougeot 1er Cru “Le Clos Blanc de Vougeot” Monopole

The vineyards controlled by the domaine include the former domaines of Claudine Deschamps, Pierre Ponnelle, Louis Voilland and L’Héritier-Guyot, along with vineyard plots owned by the Boissets. All of the domaine's vineyards use biodynamic techniques, and are certified organic; the domaine is the largest organic and biodynamic producer in the Côte d'Or (which includes the Côte de Nuits and the Côte de Beaune), with organically-farmed wines from the villages through Grand Cru vineyards. 15 hectares (37 acres) of the domaine are worked with horse-drawn plows.

The domaine's holdings now include 37 hectares (91 acres) across 29 different appellations. Holdings include the monopoles of Le Clos du Prieuré, where both white and red wines are produced, and the Premier Cru vineyard Le Clos Blanc de Vougeot. Grand Cru holdings include Charmes-Chambertin Les Mazoyères, Bonnes Mares, Musigny, Clos de Vougeot, Corton Le Clos du Roi, and Corton-Charlemagne Le Charlemagne.

Grapes for the domaine's wine are destemmed, crushed, and macerated for 4–5 days. Ambient wild yeast are used for fermentation, which takes place in open wooden vats. The wine is barrel-aged, with the percentage of new barrels ranging from 30% to 100%.

== See also ==
- Boisset Family Estates
