= Inman Family Wines =

American winery

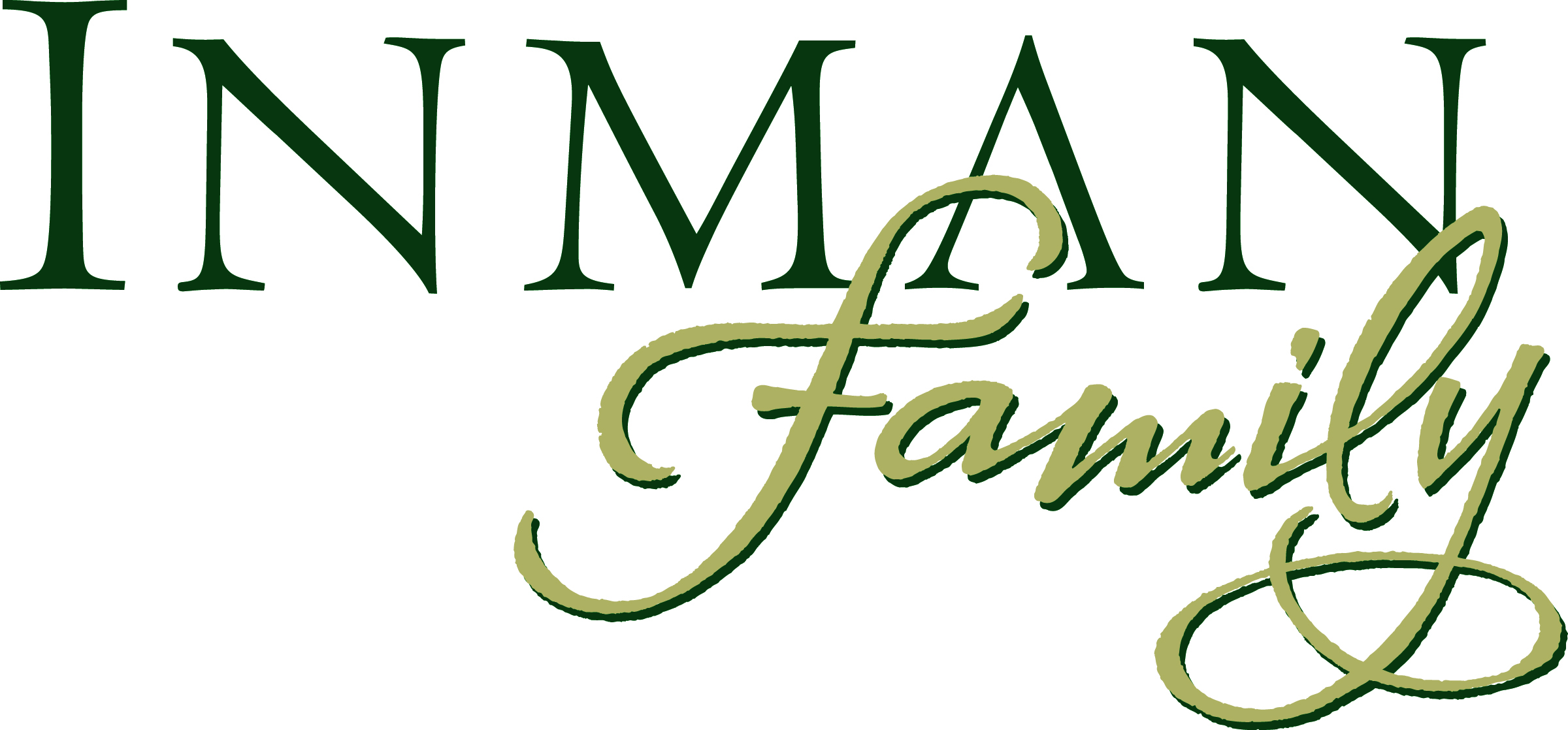
- Location: 3900 Piner Road, Santa Rosa, Russian River Valley, Sonoma County, California, United States
- Coordinates: 38°28′02″N 122°49′00″W
- Wine region: Russian River Valley
- Appellation: Russian River Valley AVA
- Founded: 2000
- First vines planted: 2000
- First vintage: 2002
- Key people: Kathleen Inman (founder, winemaker)
- Varietal: Pinot noir; chardonnay; pinot gris; rosé; sparkling; vermouth
- Distribution: Regional and national
- Tasting: Open to public
- Website: inmanfamilywines.com

Inman Family Wines is an American winery founded in 2000 by winemaker Kathleen Inman, near Santa Rosa, in the Russian River Valley of Sonoma County, California. Inman produces a range of wines including pinot noir, chardonnay, pinot gris, rosé, and sparkling wines.

== History ==
Kathleen Inman grew up in the Napa Valley in a teetotalling family. After living in England and working as a lawyer, together with her husband, Inman established the Olivet Grange Vineyard in 2000 by planting 10.5 acres (4.2 ha) of pinot noir and pinot gris. The vineyard is located in the Russian River Valley AVA and is managed using organic and regenerative farming practices. In 2010, the winery opened a solar-powered tasting room built with reclaimed materials. A power outage in 2017 resulted in Inman repurposing unfermented pinot noir grapes into vermouth.

== See also ==
- Sonoma County wine
