= Artesa Vineyards & Winery =

- Location: 1345 Henry Rd., Napa, California, United States
- Coordinates: 38°16′9.36″N 122°21′23.57″W
- Wine region: Napa Valley; Sonoma County
- Appellation: Carneros AVA; Atlas Peak AVA
- Formerly: Codorniu Napa
- Founded: 1990s
- Key people: Ana Diogo-Draper (winemaker)
- Parent company: Boisset Collection
- Area cultivated: 330
- Cases/yr: 60,000-80,000
- Varietals: Pinot Noir, Chardonnay, Cabernet Sauvignon, Tempranillo, Albariño, Merlot, Cabernet Franc
- Distribution: National
- Tasting: Open to public
- Website: artesawinery.com

Artesa Vineyards & Winery (formerly known as Codorniu Napa) is a winery located in Napa, California in the United States.

== History ==
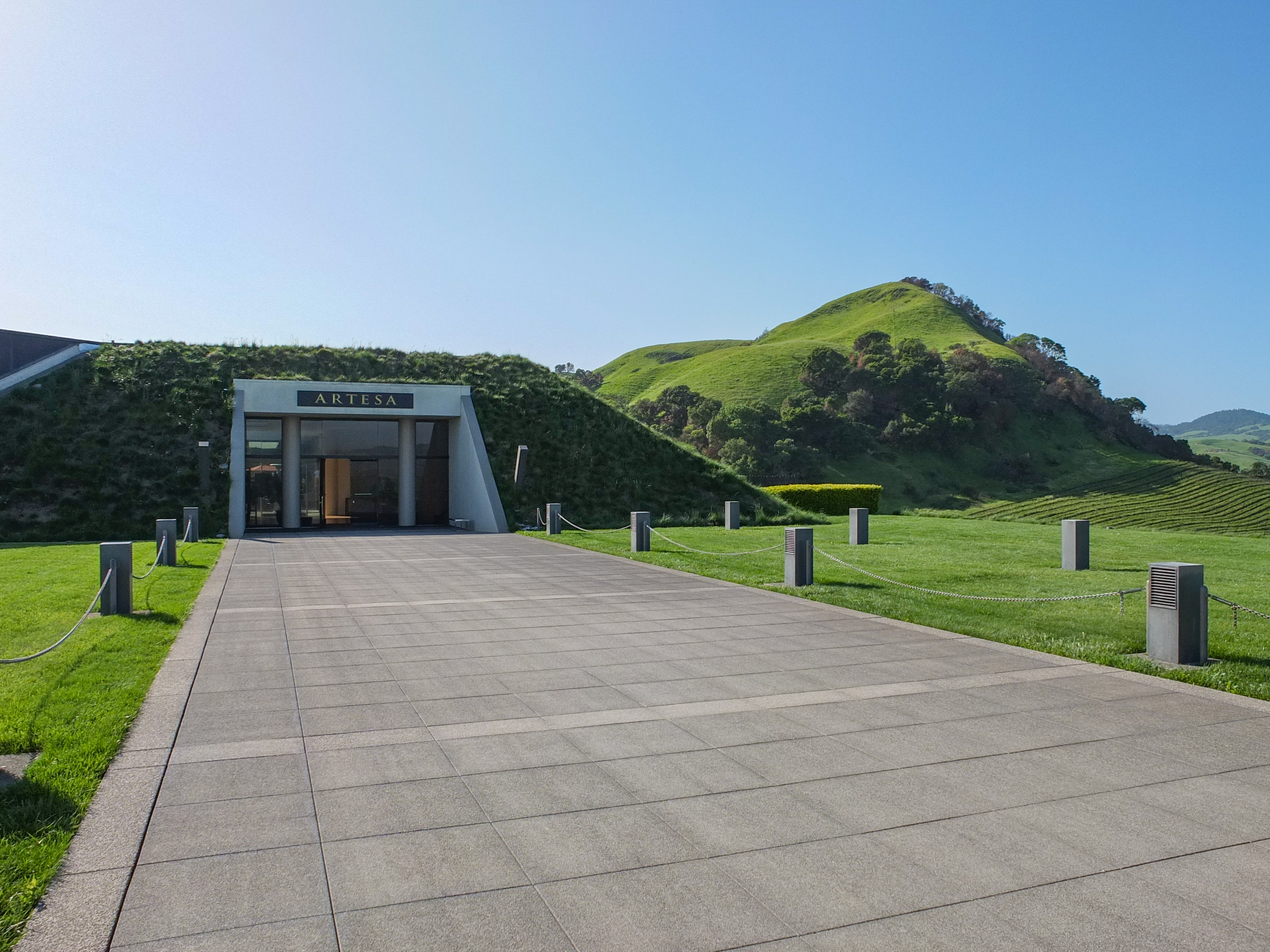
Main entrance

Artesa was originally known as Codorniu Napa. The winery was founded by the Spanish company Grupo Codorníu in 1991, investing $30 million in the facility. Codorniu Napa made sparkling wine. Lack of demand for sparkling wine led to poor sales, and the winery shifted to make still wines. Don Van Staaveren became winemaker. The company invested $20 million for a new winery and new vineyard acquisitions and Dave Dobson became Vice President of Production and Winemaking.

Artesa Winery opened in 1997 and is located on a hilltop in the Carneros AVA area of Napa County. That same year, Artesa purchased a Sonoma Coast AVA property for $1.7 million. The property, which comprised 324-acres, was set to be developed into Pinot Noir vineyards, upon the removal of redwood trees. The change was protested by environmentalists and in 2014 Artesa announced it would sell the property. Artesa's first wines were released in 1999.

Mark Beringer became Vice President of Production and Winemaking in 2009, replacing Dave Dobson. He left in 2015, and Assistant Winemaker, Ana Diego-Draper was promoted to take over as Director of Winemaking.

== Wines ==
Artesa's estate vineyards are Chardonnay and Pinot Noir. They also cultivate grapes in Atlas Peak AVA. The winery focuses on Pinot Noir and a small amount of sparkling wine is produced (1,000 cases). The winery produces between 60,000 and 80,000 cases of wine annually.

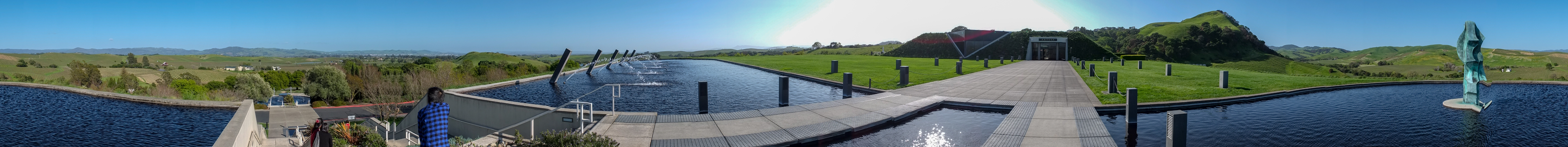
Panoramic view
