= Martinelli Winery =

Winery in Russian River Valley, California

Coordinates: 38.4883°N 122.8078°W

Martinelli Winery is located in California’s Russian River Valley and is a family business that has been growing grapes since the 1880s. It is one of the oldest surviving vineyards in Sonoma County.

== History ==
Giuseppe Martinelli and Luisa Vellutini emigrated from Friuli, Italy to California and first planting Zinfandel and Muscat Alexandria vines.

== Viticulture ==
Martinelli Winery uses natural native yeasts in fermentation, and the wines are unfiltered and unfined. Most of the Martinelli grapes are sold to others, and only a small portion go into their own wines.

Some Zinfandel wine produced has over 15% ABV.

== Criticism ==
A 2009 single-vineyard Martinelli Road was rated 94 points by Wine Spectator.
