= Merry Edwards Winery =

Californian winery

- Location: 2959 Gravenstein Highway North, Sebastopol, California
- Coordinates: 38.434914°N 122.855073°W
- Wine region: Russian River Valley AVA
- Founded: 1997; 28 years ago
- Key people: Merry Edwards (founder); Nicole Carter (president); Heidi von der Mehden (winemaker)
- Website: merryedwards.com

Merry Edwards is a Californian winery, established in 1997. It is noted for its Pinot noirs in the Russian River Valley AVA of Sonoma County.
