= Zinfandel, California =

Unincorporated community in California, United States

Zinfandel
- Unincorporated community
- Location within the state of California Zinfandel (the United States)
- Coordinates: 38°28′58″N 122°26′32″W
- Country: United States
- State: California
- County: Napa
- Elevation: 197 ft (60 m)
- Time zone: UTC-8 (Pacific)
  - Summer (DST): UTC-7 (PDT)
- ZIP codes: 94574
- Area code: 707
- FIPS code: 06-87157
- GNIS feature ID: 1660226

Zinfandel (formerly Bell Station and Pine Station) is a small unincorporated community in Napa County, California, United States, just south of the city of St. Helena in the North Bay region of the San Francisco Bay Area. It is part of the Wine Country and is located at the intersection of the St. Helena Highway (State Route 29) and Zinfandel Lane and comprises approximately 14 square blocks, most of which are rural and residential in character. The ZIP Code is 94574. The community is served by area code 707.

The town was named after the Zinfandel grape and a variety of wine produced from that grape.

== History ==
The place was first called Pine Station, and later as Bell Station, before bearing its present name.

== Economy ==
Boisset Collection is based in Zinfandel.

== Government ==
In the California State Legislature, Zinfandel is in the 3rd senatorial district, represented by Democrat Christopher Cabaldon, and in the 4th Assembly district, represented by Democrat Cecilia Aguiar-Curry.

In the United States House of Representatives, Zinfandel is in California's 4th congressional district, represented by Democrat Mike Thompson.
