= Tony Gilbert =

American football player and coach (born 1979)

Profile
- Position: Defensive analyst

Personal information
- Born: October 16, 1979 (age 47); Macon, Georgia, U.S.
- Listed height: 6 ft 0 in (1.83 m)
- Listed weight: 248 lb (112 kg)

Career information
- High school: Macon (GA) Central
- College: Georgia
- NFL draft: 2003: 6th round, 210th overall pick

Career history

Playing
- Arizona Cardinals (2003)*; Jacksonville Jaguars (2003–2007); Atlanta Falcons (2008–2009); Jacksonville Jaguars (2010)*
- * Offseason or practice squad member only

Coaching
- Georgia (2011) Assistant strength & conditioning coach; Auburn (2012) Graduate assistant; Georgia Military College (2013) Defensive backs coach; John Milledge Academy (GA) (2014) Defensive coordinator & linebackers coach; North Carolina (2015–2017) Defensive quality control assistant; UCF (2018–2019) Defensive quality control assistant; Jacksonville Jaguars (2020–2021) Assistant linebackers coach; Jacksonville Jaguars (2022–2023) Inside linebackers coach; Georgia State (2024) Defensive analyst; Atlantic Coast (FL) (2025–present) Defensive coordinator

Awards and highlights
- Second-team All-SEC (2002)

Career NFL statistics
- Total tackles: 47
- Sacks: 1
- Forced fumbles: 1
- Fumble recoveries: 1
- Stats at Pro Football Reference

Antonio C. Gilbert (born October 16, 1979) is an American football coach and former linebacker. He played college football at Georgia and was selected by the Arizona Cardinals in the sixth round of the 2003 NFL draft. He was also a member of the Jacksonville Jaguars and Atlanta Falcons.

== Playing career ==
=== College ===
As a senior at the University of Georgia (UGA), he earned All-Southeastern Conference second-team honors and started every game at middle linebacker. He tied for the team lead with a career-high 114 tackles and recorded 2.5 sacks, 15 stops for losses, 13 quarterback pressures, 1 forced fumble and deflected 2 passes. Member of Zeta Nu chapter of Phi Beta Sigma fraternity at the University of Georgia.

=== National Football League ===
==== Arizona Cardinals ====
Gilbert was selected by the Arizona Cardinals in the 2003 NFL draft. His two sons, Jacobi and Amir, were born the same year.

==== Jacksonville Jaguars (first stint) ====
He was signed off the Cardinals practice squad in 2003 by the Jacksonville Jaguars. He played five seasons with the Jaguars before being released during final cuts on August 30, 2008.

==== Atlanta Falcons ====
Two days after his release from the Jaguars, Gilbert was signed by the Atlanta Falcons on September 1, 2008. The move reunited him with Falcons head coach Mike Smith, who was defensive coordinator for the Jaguars during Gilbert's time in Jacksonville. The Falcons released linebacker Tony Taylor to make room for Gilbert on the roster.

On December 8, Gilbert was placed on Injured Reserve due to a hamstring injury. An unrestricted free agent in the 2009 offseason, Gilbert was re-signed by the Falcons on February 27.

==== Jacksonville Jaguars (second stint) ====
On August 8, 2010, the Jaguars signed Gilbert and two other players. On September 4, 2010, Gilbert was released.

== Coaching career ==
=== Georgia ===
Gilbert began his coaching career at the University of Georgia, his alma mater, as an assistant strength and conditioning coach in 2011.

=== Auburn ===
In 2012, Gilbert joined Auburn University as a defensive graduate assistant and assistant linebackers coach.

=== Georgia Military College ===
In 2013, Gilbert was hired by Georgia Military College as their Assistant defensive backs & linebackers coach.

=== John Milledge Academy ===
In 2014, Gilbert joined John Milledge Academy as their defensive coordinator and linebackers coach.

=== North Carolina ===
In 2015, Gilbert joined the University of North Carolina at Chapel Hill as a defensive quality control specialist & assistant linebackers coach.

=== UCF ===
In 2018, Gilbert was hired as a defensive quality control coach at the University of Central Florida (UCF). In 2018, UCF won The American conference championship against Memphis. UCF went on to compete in the New Year's Six Fiesta Bowl, ranked No. 8 nationally, facing the No. 6 LSU Tigers.

=== Jacksonville Jaguars ===
On June 12, 2020, Gilbert was hired by the Jacksonville Jaguars as their assistant linebackers coach under head coach Doug Marrone.

On February 11, 2021, Gilbert was retained by the Jaguars under head coach Urban Meyer.

On February 17, 2022, Gilbert was retained under new head coach Doug Pederson.
