= Hamp Tanner =

American football player (1927–2004)

No. 46, 78
- Position: Defensive tackle

Personal information
- Born: October 31, 1927; Nicholls, Georgia, U.S.
- Died: December 6, 2004 (aged 77); Winterville, Georgia, U.S.
- Listed height: 6 ft 2 in (1.88 m)
- Listed weight: 280 lb (127 kg)

Career information
- High school: Lanier (Macon, Georgia)
- College: Georgia (1947–1950)
- NFL draft: 1950: 30th round, 384th overall pick

Career history
- San Francisco 49ers (1951); Dallas Texans (1952); Baltimore Colts (1953)*
- * Offseason or practice squad member only
- Stats at Pro Football Reference

Elijah Hampton Tanner (October 31, 1927 – December 6, 2004) was an American professional football defensive tackle who played two seasons in the National Football League (NFL) with the San Francisco 49ers and Dallas Texans. He played college football at the University of Georgia.

== Early life and college ==
Elijah Hampton Tanner was born on October 31, 1927, in Nicholls, Georgia. He attended Lanier High School in Macon, Georgia.

Tanner was a member of the Georgia Bulldogs of the University of Georgia from 1947 to 1950 and a three-year letterman from 1948 to 1950.

== Professional career ==
Tanner was selected by the New York Giants in the 30th round, with the 384th overall pick, of the 1950 NFL draft. He signed with the San Francisco 49ers on May 25, 1951. He played in 12 games for the 49ers during the 1951 season and scored one safety. The 49ers finished the year second in the National Division with a 7–4–1 record. He was waived in late September 1952.

Tanner was claimed off waivers by the Dallas Texans on September 29, 1952. He appeared in ten games, all starts, for the Texans in 1952, recording one fumble recovery and one kick return for 19 yards. The Texans finished the season with a 1–11 record.

Tanner signed with the Baltimore Colts on July 10, 1953. On August 20, 1953, it was reported that Tanner had been released.

== Personal life ==
Tanner served in the United States Navy. He died on December 6, 2004, in Winterville, Georgia.
