= Vougeot =

- Commune
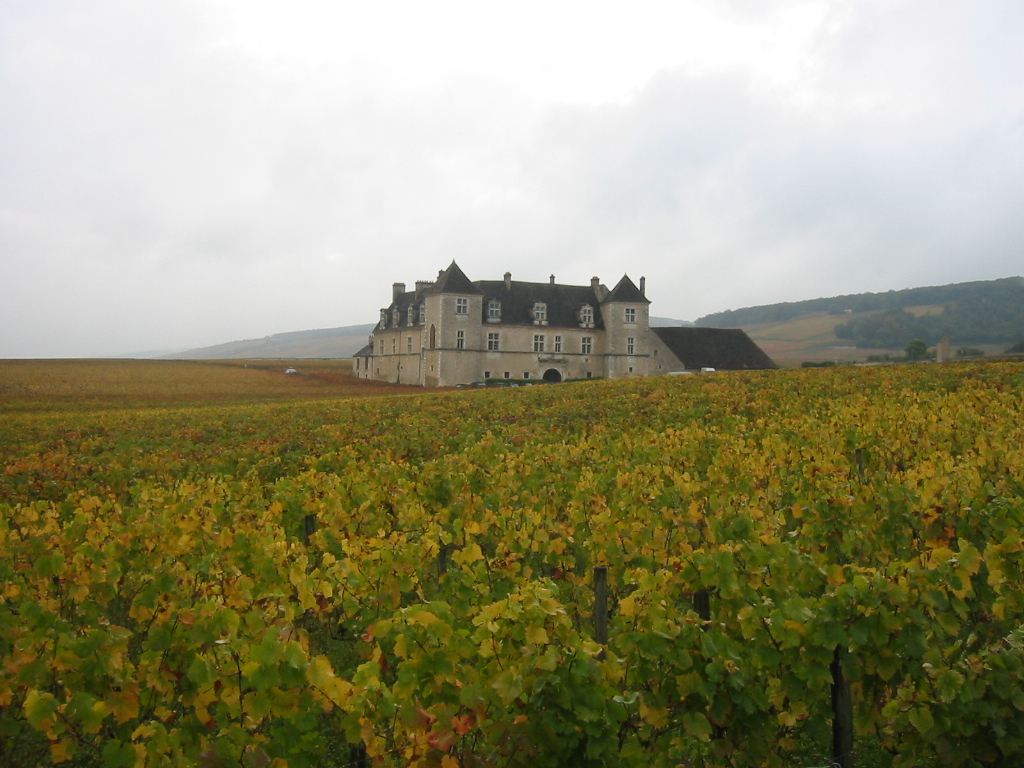
- Château du Clos de Vougeot

- Coat of arms
- Location of Vougeot
- Location within France Location within Bourgogne-Franche-Comté
- Coordinates: 47°10′38″N 4°57′51″E
- Country: France
- Region: Bourgogne-Franche-Comté
- Department: Côte-d'Or
- Arrondissement: Beaune
- Canton: Nuits-Saint-Georges
- Intercommunality: Gevrey-Chambertin et Nuits-Saint-Georges

Government
  - Mayor (2020–2026): Claude Charles
- Area^{1}: 0.88 km^{2} (0.34 sq mi)
- Elevation: 237 m (778 ft)
- Highest elevation: 275 m (902 ft)
- Lowest elevation: 233 m (764 ft)
- Population (2023): 150
  - Density: 170/km^{2} (440/sq mi)
- Time zone: UTC+01:00 (CET)
  - Summer (DST): UTC+02:00 (CEST)
- INSEE/Postal code: 21716 /21640
- ^{1} French Land Register data, which excludes lakes, ponds, glaciers > 1 km^{2} (0.386 sq mi or 247 acres) and river estuaries.

Vougeot (French pronunciation: [vuʒo]) is a commune in the Côte-d'Or department and Bourgogne-Franche-Comté region of eastern France. The name itself derives from that of the little river Vouge. Cîteaux Abbey established these vineyards in the 12th century. Rather unusually for the Côte de Nuits, Vougeot produces white wines (Chardonnay) as well as red (Pinot Noir). The appellation was formally instituted in 1936.

== Population ==
Historical population
Year	Pop.	±% p.a.
1968	164	—
1975	178	+1.18%
1982	197	+1.46%
1990	176	−1.40%
1999	187	+0.68%
2007	209	+1.40%
2012	181	−2.84%
2017	177	−0.45%
2023	150	−2.72%
Source: INSEE

== Wine ==
The historical wall-enclosed Grand Cru vineyard Clos Vougeot is situated within the commune and makes up most of its vineyard surface.

== Notable people ==
Vintner Jean-Charles Boisset was born in Vougeot.

== See also ==
- Clos Vougeot
- Communes of the Côte-d'Or department
- Route des Grands Crus
