= DeLoach Vineyards =

Californian winery

Coordinates: 38°27′43″N 122°49′16″W

- Location: Santa Rosa, California, USA
- Appellation: Russian River Valley AVA
- Founded: 1975
- First vintage: 1975
- Key people: Jean-Charles Boisset, Proprietor; Brian Maloney, Director of Winemaking; Lisa Heisinger, CEO
- Parent company: Boisset Collection
- Known for: O.F.S. Pinot Noir
- Varietals: Pinot Noir, Chardonnay, Zinfandel
- Tasting: Open seven days a week from 10 AM - 4:30 PM.
- Website: http://www.deloachvineyards.com

DeLoach Vineyards was started in 1975 by Cecil DeLoach, Christine DeLoach, Berle Beliz and Jack Fleming, and was one of the first wineries established in the Russian River Valley, Sonoma County, California after Prohibition.

The winery ran into financial difficulties in late 2001 due to over-expansion and poor market conditions. The winery's peak production was 250,000 cases. In May 2003, DeLoach Vineyards filed for Chapter 11 bankruptcy. The Boisset family of Burgundy, France purchased DeLoach in November 2003.

In 2005 Cecil and Christine De Loach started a new winery, Hook & Ladder. In May 2005, Joe Anderson and Mary Dewane purchased Hartman Lane Vineyards and Winery, an 18-acre property and winery facility in the Russian River Valley AVA from Cecil De Loach, to start Benovia Winery.
