= Abraham Lincoln High School (San Francisco) =

Public school in Sunset District, California, United States

- ALHS

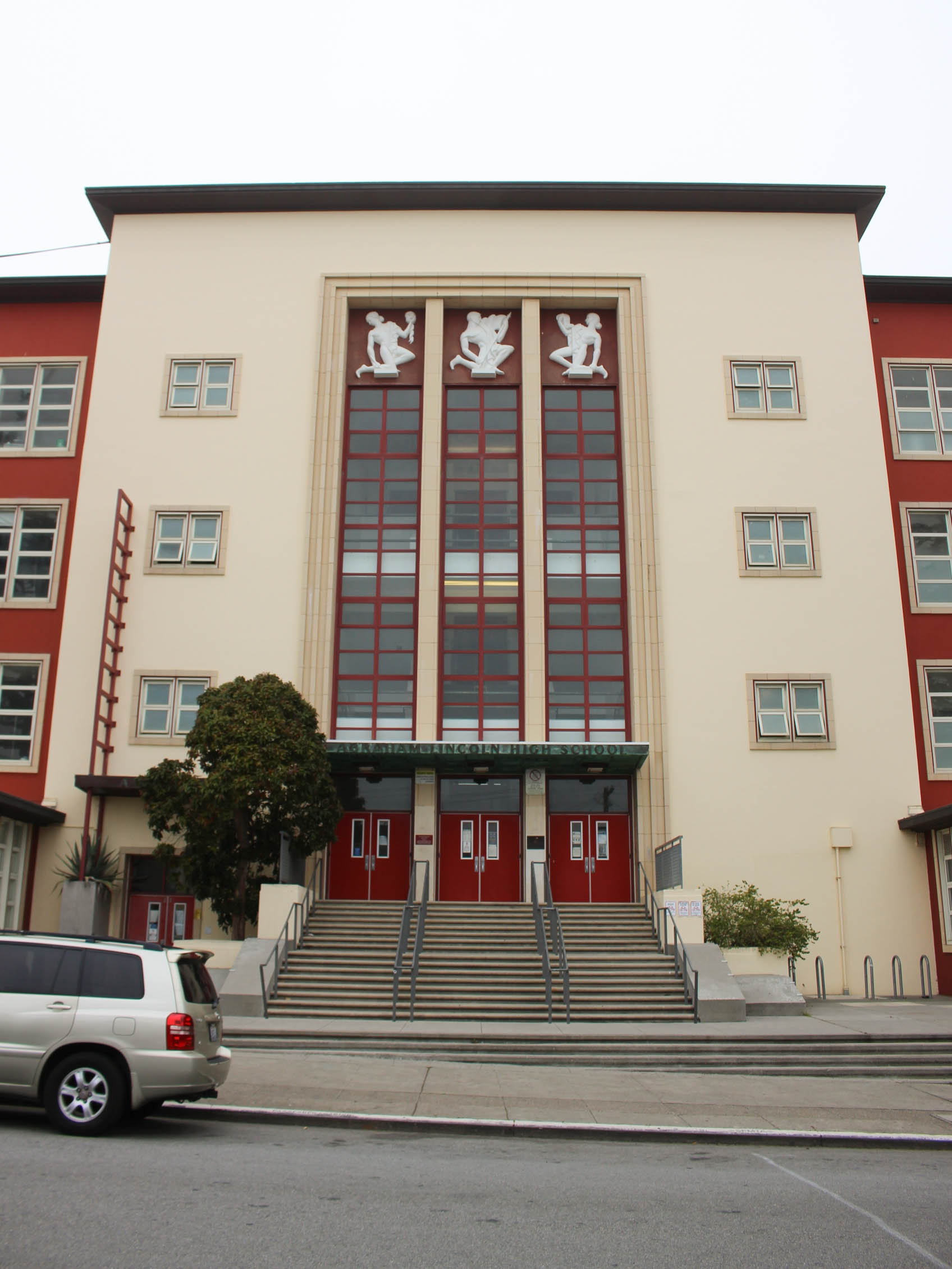
- Main entrance on 24th Avenue

Location
- 2162 24th Avenue; Sunset District (San Francisco), California 94116; United States; 37.74728°N 122.48103°W

Information
- School type: Public school
- Motto: Latin: Finimus Coepturi (Finish to begin)
- Established: August 27, 1940
- Founder: Clyde W. White
- School board: San Francisco Board of Education
- School district: San Francisco Unified School District
- NCES District ID: 05581
- Superintendent: Maria Su
- School number: 405
- Principal: Marisol Arkin
- Staff: 83.71 (FTE)
- Enrollment: 2,037 (2023–2024)
- Student to teacher ratio: 24.33
- Campus type: Urban
- Color: Crimson & Gold
- Athletics conference: CIF San Francisco Section
- Mascot: Mustang
- Rival: George Washington High School
- Accreditation: Western Association of Schools and Colleges
- Newspaper: Lincoln Log
- Graduates (2016): 467
- Website: www.sfusd.edu/school/abraham-lincoln-high-school

Abraham Lincoln High School (ALHS, colloquially Lincoln) is a California Distinguished public high school located in the Sunset District on the West Side of San Francisco, California. In 2018, ALHS was ranked #499 and earned a gold medal by U.S. News & World Report, placing it in the top 2% of public high schools nationally.

ALHS offers honors and college prep programs, and offers students the ability to specialize in one of five academic areas: business, digital media design, teaching, and environmental science.

ALHS provides services and special education for severely and non-severely impaired students, including a comprehensive English Language Learner (ELL) program, a Mandarin Secondary Dual Language Pathway, four years of Spanish, Mandarin, and Japanese instruction, a GATE pathway for gifted and talented students, a Wellness Center, Peer Resource Program, AVID, Step-to-College, clubs, athletics, and extracurriculars.

== History, location, and facilities ==
Abraham Lincoln High School was established on Tuesday, August 27, 1940, accepting approximately 950 students under principal Clyde W. White. Its opening and dedication ceremony was held on September 22, 1940.

ALHS is a "westside" school along with Lowell High School and George Washington High School.

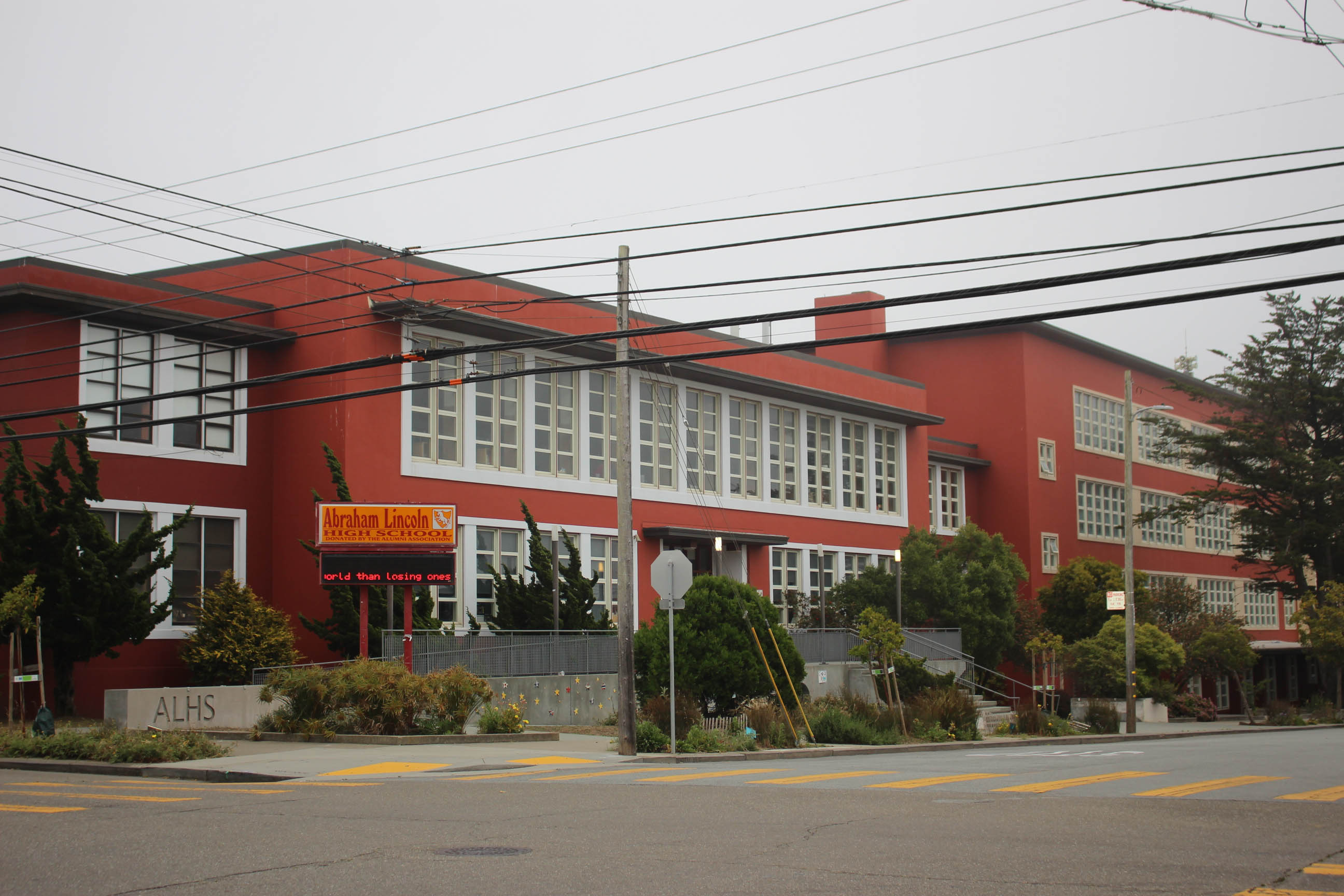
ALHS at the corner of Quintara and 24th

On a hill, in the center of the Sunset District, ALHS occupies four city blocks demarcated by the intersections of Quintara Street and Santiago Street and 22nd Avenue and 24th Avenue. The school is located near the Sunset Reservoir, which supplies water for the Sunset district and serves as a rectangular, city-block track for physical education, and directly north of McCoppin Square, the Taraval Police Station, and the Parkside branch of the San Francisco Public Library.

A 1938 bond issue, approved by San Francisco voters to address the increasing population in the Western San Francisco area, financed the incorporation of ALHS with a three-story building of 50 classrooms, library, and cafeteria as well as a football field, costing over $750,000 in 1940 (adjusted for 2005 dollars, over $10 million). Additions such as the North and South Gymnasiums, the auditorium, and the "New Building" expansion were completed later.

ALHS has been the beneficiary of the Prop A Bond work for remodeling and renovation. The site has been fully updated for the Americans with Disabilities Act.

In 2020 the San Francisco School Renaming Panel argued that Abraham Lincoln, the school's namesake, had treated Native Americans very poorly, and therefore, the school should no longer have his name. Mayor of San Francisco London Breed criticized the renaming proposal, arguing that there were more important tasks to focus on during the COVID-19 pandemic. A video recording of the meeting does not show that the committee discussed the proposal to rename Lincoln. The school board dropped the plan to rename the school.

== Academics and admissions ==
Abraham Lincoln High School is a comprehensive school that does not require special applications, testing, or auditions for admission. As with all SFUSD schools, Lincoln's admissions are affected by the "diversity index", which considers factors such as socioeconomic status, academic achievement, parents' educational background, and the API score of the sending school.

For the 2017–2018 school year, ALHS was the second most requested high school in the district, after Lowell. 34% (1,548) of all applicants requested Lowell as a 1st choice, and 19% (868) requested Lincoln.

== Traditions ==
The school colors are red and gold, and the school mascot is the Mustang.

The school hymn, titled "High on a Hilltop", was written by Lincoln graduate Patricia Cutler Aversano in 1943.

The Bell Game is a 70-year old football tradition between Lincoln and rival Washington High School. The winning school receives the prized bell. Spirit week takes place the week of the Bell Game.

The annual Unity Assembly (formerly Brotherhood and Sisterhood Assembly) is one of the largest events at ALHS. Various clubs perform to celebrate the school's diversity. Unity Assembly began to understand other cultures after a near-fatal school-related shooting, which resulted in a paralyzed teenager over twenty years ago. Unity Assembly is a two-hour assembly presented by extracurricular clubs that promote tolerance and awareness.

Lincoln hosts two seasonal festivals each year: Fall Fest and Spring Fest. During these Fests, clubs hold fundraising activities in the open courtyard.

The Turkey Day game is the city championship football game held annually on Thanksgiving.

== In popular culture ==
The first Star Trek convention in Northern California was held at Lincoln in 1975.

In the Cartoon Network show The Amazing World of Gumball (2011-2019) and its sequel series The Wonderfully Weird World of Gumball (2025), a visually tweaked version of the exterior is used to represent the school the characters attend. In the show, the walls are beige instead of white, the doors are multicolored, and the sign shows the name of the school as it is referred to in the show.

== Extracurricular and community work ==
ALHS has over 40 clubs and student organizations, including Mock Trial, Debate, Drama and Tech, Improv, UNICEF, Chess, GSA (Gender Sexuality Alliance), Surf, Rowing, KPOP, Glee, JROTC (Color Guard, Drum Corps, Exhibition and Flag and Exhibition Drill Teams), Black Student Union, Korean, Japanese Culture, and FilAm (Filipino American).

ALHS has made charitable contributions and ran charitable campaigns, with annual drives for organizations such as the San Francisco Food Bank and Salvation Army. In 2004, the San Francisco Food Bank recognized ALHS for collecting the most food out of all San Francisco schools. Also, that year, students raised $10,000 in the wake of the 2004 Asian tsunami.

== Athletics ==
ALHS fields varsity teams in baseball, basketball, cheerleading, cross country, fencing, football, golf, soccer, softball, swimming, tennis, volleyball, and wrestling. ALHS also offers track and field, badminton, softball, weightlifting, and girls' flag football. Additionally, ALHS has several athletic and sports clubs, including archery, cycling, and dragon boat.

=== Dragon boat team ===
Established in 1996, the ALHS co-ed dragon boat team is one of the largest in the Bay Area. The ALHS dragon boat team won the World Championship title at the 11th International Dragon Boat Federation (IDBF) Club Crew World Championship Races in Szeged, Hungary, in July 2018.

=== Varsity football ===
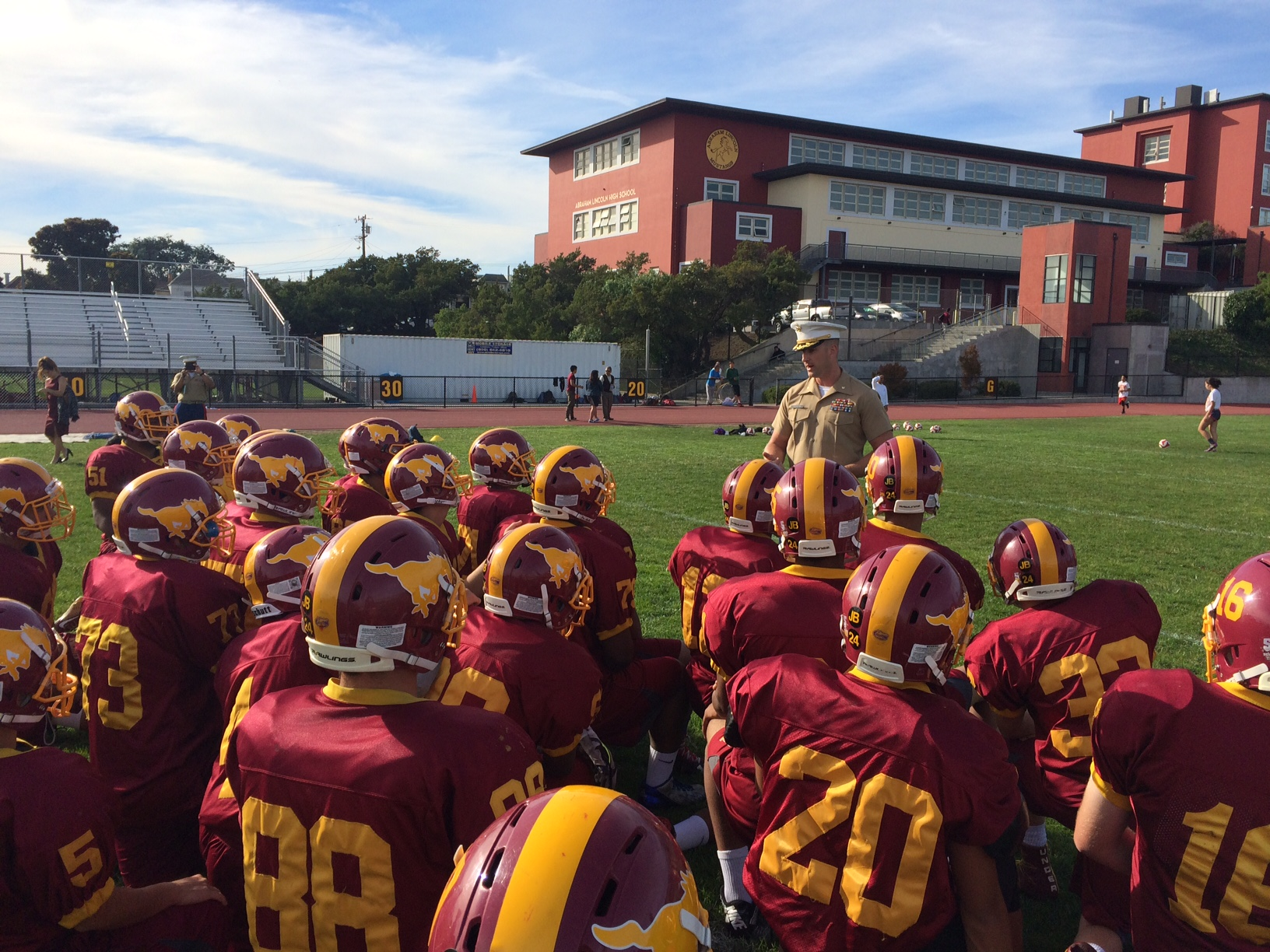
Marine recruiter gives motivational speech to ALHS varsity football team on sports field

The ALHS Varsity Mustangs were the back-to-back California State Champions for football in 2018 and 2019. On December 15, 2018, the Mustangs defeated visiting Orange Glen High School, the San Diego Section Division V champion, 24–13 in the CIF Division VI state title game at City College of San Francisco. It was the first state title in the school's history in the first-ever state championship game held in San Francisco.

On December 14, 2019, the Mustangs defeated Gardena High School Panthers 35–26 in the Division 7AA state championship at City College of San Francisco.

== Demographics ==
- 2016–2017
  - 2072 students; M/F (56.1/ 43.9)

Asian	Latino	White	African-American	Filipino	Two or more races	American Indian	Pacific Islander	Other/declined to say
51.5%	24.6%	7.5%	5.3%	4.3%	1.1%	.7%	.7%	4%

- 2017-2018
  - 126 Certificated Teachers;

== Notable alumni ==
Name	Class Year	Notability	Reference(s)
Joan Blackman	1955	Actress	
Brooksley Born	1956	American attorney and chairperson of the Commodity Futures Trading Commission (CFTC).	
John L. Burton	1950	President of the California State Senate and Congressman	
Ray Cosey	1973	Professional baseball player in Major League Baseball and in Nippon Professional Baseball	
Cecil O. De Loach, Jr.	1956	Firefighter, winemaker, viticulturist	
Bob DiPietro	1945	Baseball player for the Boston Red Sox	
Barbara Eden	1949	Actress and singer	
Einar Enevoldson	1950	NASA test pilot and director of the Perlan Project	
Vince Guaraldi	1946	Jazz musician, pianist, and Grammy Award-winning composer; best known for composing music for animated adaptations of the Peanuts comic strip	
Mike Holmgren	1966	NFL head coach of the Seattle Seahawks and Green Bay Packers	
Jess Jackson	1947	Founder of Kendall-Jackson, Sonoma County's largest wine company	
Martin Jenkins	1971	California Supreme Court Justice, former Federal District Court Judge and Trustee, most widely known for presiding over the largest civil rights class-action suit in American history, Dukes v. Wal-Mart	
Ron Jones (teacher)	1958	Disability advocate and author	
Gus Lee	1964	Author, attorney, legal educator, and whistleblower	
Zeph Lee	1981	Football player for the Denver Broncos and Los Angeles Raiders	
Johnny Miller	1965	Professional golfer and golf commentator for NBC Sports.	
Martin J. Pasqualetti	1962	Professional geographer who pioneered work on energy landscapes	
Alonzo Powell	1982	Professional baseball player. Former hitting instructor for the San Francisco Giants	
Richard Serra	1956	Minimalist sculptor	
Tony Serra	1952	Trial attorney and tax activist	
Jeffrey Tambor	1961	Emmy Award winning actor	
Laurence Tribe	1958	Professor of Constitutional Law at Harvard	
Ken Venturi	1949	Professional golfer and sports commentator	
BD Wong	1978	Television, film, and Tony Award-winning theater actor	
Micah Franklin	1990	Professional baseball player in MLB, NPB, and the KBO	

== See also ==
- San Francisco County high schools
