= Theron Sapp =

American football player (born 1935)

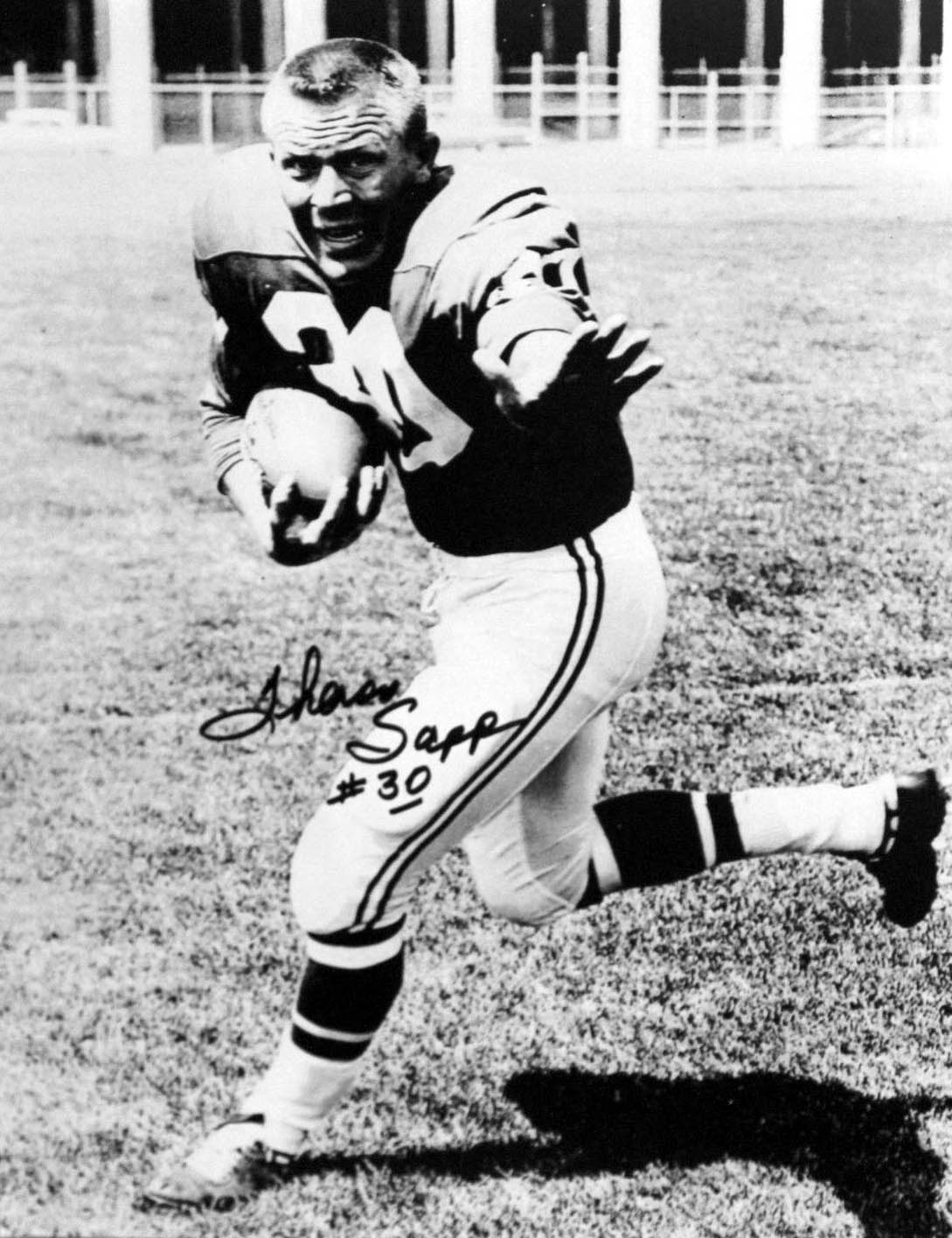
- Sapp while playing for the Philadelphia Eagles

No. 30, 33
- Position: Halfback

Personal information
- Born: June 15, 1935 (age 91); Dublin, Georgia, U.S.
- Listed height: 6 ft 1 in (1.85 m)
- Listed weight: 203 lb (92 kg)

Career information
- High school: Lanier (Macon, Georgia)
- College: Georgia (1955–1958)
- NFL draft: 1958: 10th round, 112th overall pick

Career history
- Philadelphia Eagles (1959–1963); Pittsburgh Steelers (1963–1965)

Awards and highlights
- NFL champion (1960); First-team All-SEC (1958); Third-team All-SEC (1957); Georgia Bulldogs No. 40 retired

Career NFL statistics
- Rushing yards: 763
- Rushing average: 3.8
- Rushing touchdowns: 5
- Receptions: 23
- Receiving yards: 247
- Stats at Pro Football Reference

Theron Coleman Sapp (born June 15, 1935), nicknamed "Thundering Theron" and "Drought-Breaker", is an American former professional football player who was a halfback for the Philadelphia Eagles and the Pittsburgh Steelers of the National Football League (NFL). He played college football for the Georgia Bulldogs.

== Early life ==
Sapp was born in Dublin, Georgia, and grew up in nearby Macon, attending that city's Lanier High School. As a High School senior, Sapp led his team to the 1953 state championship game but lost 9–6 to a Grady High School team from Atlanta coached by future Bulldogs assistant coach Erk Russell.

== College career ==
After signing to play college football at UGA, Sapp fractured a vertebra in a diving accident in the Spring of 1954. After recovering from his injury that year, Sapp participated in spring practice in 1955 and participated on the B team that Fall. In 1956, Sapp played on the Varsity team; however, another injury relegated him to reserve status. In 1957, Sapp became the starting fullback and rushed 137 times for 599 yards and won All-SEC honors. In 1958, he was named the All-SEC fullback.

His performance in the 1957 Georgia-Georgia Tech game led to Sapp's nickname of Drought-Breaker. Georgia Tech, UGA's fiercest rival at the time, had won the previous eight annual meetings between the two teams from 1949 to 1956, the longest winning streak in the series. Playing defense as a back-up in the 3rd Quarter of the game, Sapp recovered a fumble by Tech's offense at midfield. On Georgia's ensuing offensive possession, Sapp carried the ball nine times including a one-yard touchdown carry on fourth and goal for the game's only score in a 7-0 UGA win.

Sapp's jersey, number 40, is one of four to be retired by UGA (the others being Frank Sinkwich, Charley Trippi and Herschel Walker).

== Professional career ==
Sapp was selected by the Philadelphia Eagles in the tenth round of the 1958 NFL draft. He played running back for them through 1963.
