= Bernard Ramsey =

American businessman

- Born: November 10, 1915; Macon, Georgia
- Died: July 11, 1996 (aged 80); New York City
- Education: University of Georgia
- Occupation: Executive

Bernard Bruce Ramsey (November 10, 1915 – July 11, 1996) was an executive with Merrill Lynch, a brokerage firm, but is best known for his philanthropic contributions to the University of Georgia.

A native of Macon, Georgia, United States, Ramsey graduated Lanier High School before moving on to the University of Georgia in Athens, Georgia, where he attended what is now known as the Terry College of Business and received a Bachelor of Science (B.S.) in Commerce in 1937. While in college, he was a member of the Army ROTC, Delta Sigma Pi and Alpha Tau Omega fraternities, Order of the Greek Horsemen and the Gridiron Secret Society.

After serving as a lieutenant colonel in United States Air Force during World War II, Ramsey joined Merrill Lynch as a salesman. By the time of his retirement in 1973, he had become a senior vice president and was the chair of the executive committee of the firm.

Over the next two decades, he gave generously to his alma mater, culminating in a $20 million gift in 1993. He also left $18.8 million to the university in his will. To date, Ramsey is the largest individual benefactor of the University of Georgia.

As a result of his efforts, the names of Ramsey and his wife, Eugenia, appear frequently in conjunction with the university, especially with regards to the business school, which is home to the Bernard B. and Eugenia A. Ramsey Center for Private Enterprise. The nation's largest student recreation center and a major scholarship award are named after Ramsey, as well as numerous endowed chairs, programs, and classrooms across campus. A bronze statue of Ramsey sits on a park bench outside UGA's Honors College. The Ramsey Concert Hall is one of two musical recital halls located in the UGA Performing and Visual Arts Complex.

Ramsey also endowed the Bernard B. and Eugenia A. Ramsey Chair of Private Enterprise in the Andrew Young School of Policy Studies at Georgia State University in 1963.
