= Fratelli Vineyards =

Indian winery

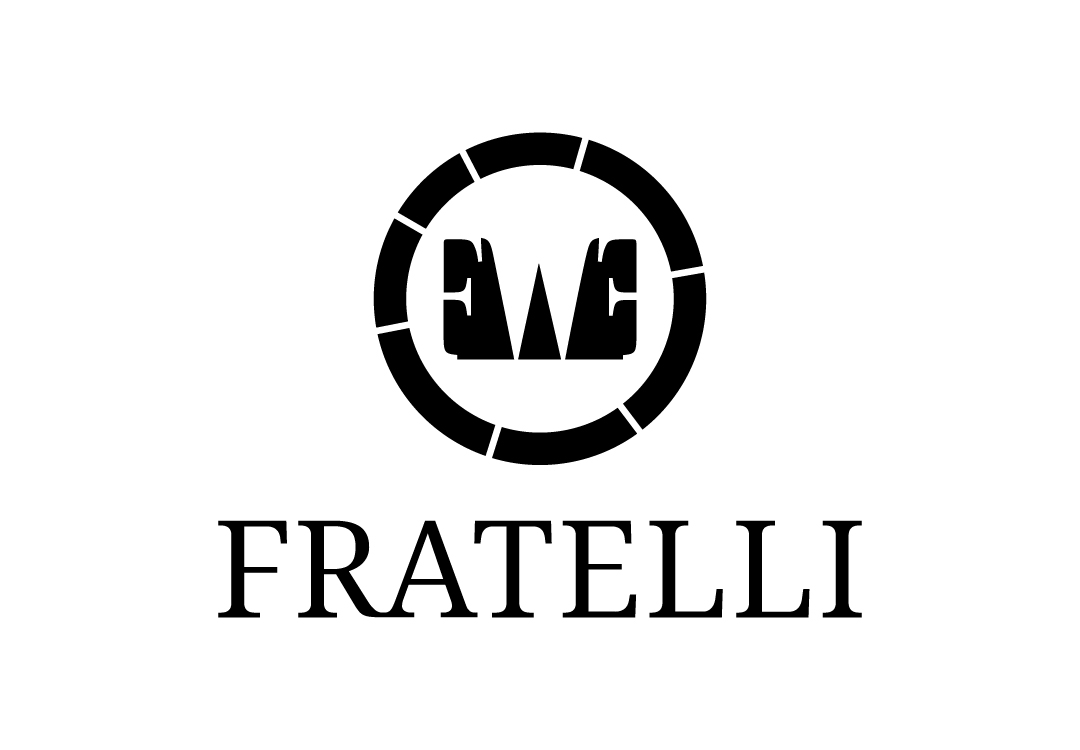
- Type: Private
- Industry: Wine
- Founded: 2007
- Founders: Alessio Secci, Andrea Secci, Kapil Sekhri, Gaurav Sekhri, Ranjit Mohite-Patil, Arjun Mohite-Patil
- Headquarters: Akluj, Solapur District, Maharashtra; India
- Area served: India and international
- Key people: Piero Masi (Chief Winemaker)
- Products: Wine, cheese
- Brands: Sette, J’Noon, TiLT
- Website: www.fratelliwines.in

Fratelli Vineyards is an Indian winery based in Akluj, Solapur District, Maharashtra region of India.

== History ==
Fratelli means brothers in Italian is a collaborative venture involving the Secci brothers from Italy and the Sekhri and Mohite-Patil brothers from India.

It was conceived in 2007 by three sets of brothers: Italy's Secci brothers, Alessio and Andrea, New Delhi-based Sekhri brothers, Kapil and Gaurav, and Mohite-Patil Ranjit and Arjun from Solapur. Production is overseen by the Tuscan winemaker Piero Masi.

The company has 240 acres of vineyard in Akluj, Solapur, Maharashtra and Karnataka. The Vineyard is accessible to general public for staying and wine tasting. Fratelli Wines are based on French grape varieties plus Sangiovese.

In 2018, Fratelli started exporting wines to countries like France and the Netherlands.

== Brands ==
In 2015, Fratelli partnered with Jean-Charles Boisset to import some of its labels into India. In 2018, in partnership with Jean-Charles Boisset, Fratelli launched its J'Noon brand of wines.

In 2020, Fratelli launched four flavours of wine in cans, to target young population.TiLT is a canned wine offering various flavors, including Red, White, Bubbly, and Bubbly Rosé. It has gained attention for its innovative approach to wine.

In 2021, Fratelli Wines launched a line of cheese to accompany their wines.

== See also ==
- Indian wine
