= Freeman Vineyard & Winery =

Coordinates: 38.4096°N 122.8817°W

Freeman Vineyard & Winery is a California winery based in the Southern Russian River Valley AVA just outside Sebastopol in Sonoma County. The winery was founded in 2001 by Ken and Akiko Freeman. They are recognized for producing cool-climate Pinot noir and Chardonnay in a Burgundian style.

== History ==
Akiko Freeman and Ed Kurtzman are the winemakers. The winery produces 4500 cases wine, a large percentage of which is exported to the Asian market.
