= Zeph Lee =

American football player (born 1963)

No. 41, 40
- Positions: Running back, safety

Personal information
- Born: June 17, 1963 (age 63); San Francisco, California, U.S.
- Listed height: 6 ft 3 in (1.91 m)
- Listed weight: 208 lb (94 kg)

Career information
- High school: Lincoln (San Francisco)
- College: USC
- NFL draft: 1986: 9th round, 246th overall pick

Career history
- Los Angeles Raiders (1986–1987); Denver Broncos (1987); Los Angeles Raiders (1987–1989); Saskatchewan Roughriders (1992)*; Sacramento Attack (1992); Arizona Rattlers (1994); Miami Hooters (1995)
- * Offseason or practice squad member only

Awards and highlights
- ArenaBowl champion (1994)

Career NFL statistics
- Interceptions: 1
- Stats at Pro Football Reference
- Stats at ArenaFan.com

Zephrini Lee (born June 17, 1963) is an American former professional football player who played three seasons in the National Football League (NFL) with the Denver Broncos and Los Angeles Raiders. He was selected by the Raiders in the ninth round of the 1986 NFL draft. He played college football for the USC Trojans. Lee was also a member of the Saskatchewan Roughriders, Sacramento Attack, Arizona Rattlers and Miami Hooters.

== Early life ==
Lee attended Abraham Lincoln High School in San Francisco, California.

== Professional career ==
Lee was selected by the Los Angeles Raiders in the ninth round with the 246th overall pick in the 1986 NFL Draft. He spent the 1986 season on the injured reserve list. He was released by the Raiders after the team's third preseason game in 1987.

Lee signed with the Denver Broncos as a replacement player during the 1987 NFL players' strike and played in one game for the team before being released.

Lee then signed with the Los Angeles Raiders and played in the final two replacement games. He remained on the team after the strike was over and converted to safety late in the season. He played in 21 games, starting seven, as a safety from 1988 to 1989. Lee was released by the Raiders on July 23, 1991.

Lee spent time on the Saskatchewan Roughriders' practice roster in 1992.

Lee played for the Sacramento Attack during the 1992 season.

Lee played for the Arizona Rattlers in 1994. The Rattlers won ArenaBowl VIII against the Orlando Predators on September 2, 1994.

Lee played for the Miami Hooters during the 1995 season.

== Personal life ==
Lee earned his master's degree from the University of Regina. His son Ira Lee played college basketball for the Arizona Wildcats.
