= Boisset Collection =

- Industry: Wine production
- Founded: France
- Headquarters: Zinfandel, California
- Key people: Jean-Charles Boisset
- Products: Wine

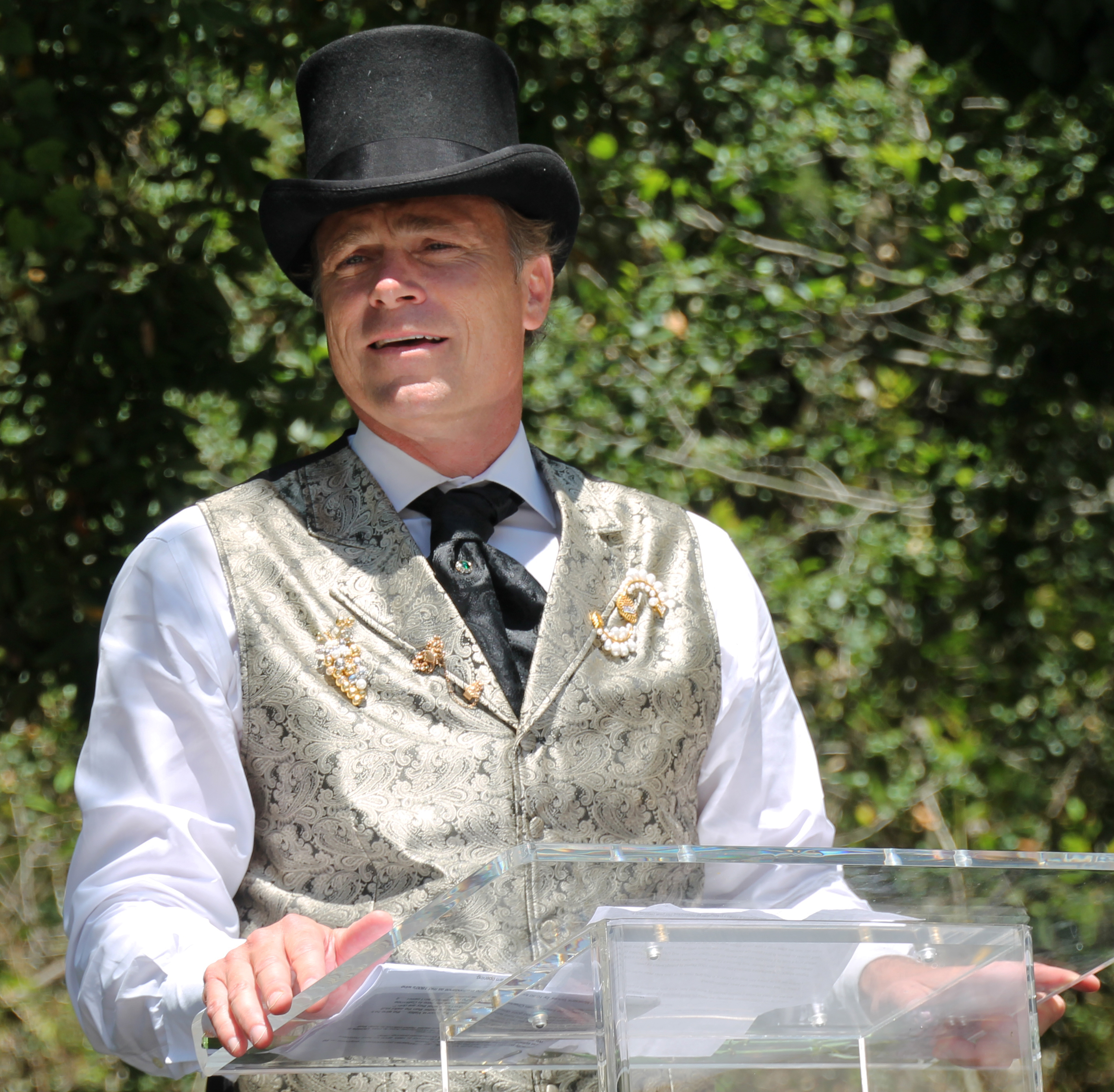
Jean-Charles Boisset at Buena Vista Winery in 2015

Boisset Collection (formally known as Boisset Family Estates) is the US office of family-owned Boisset, La Famille des Grands Vins, France's third largest wine group, and Burgundy's largest wine producer. A family-owned producer and importer of wines from France, California, Italy and Canada, Boisset Family Estates is one of the Top 25 wine producers in the United States.

The Boisset Collection is led by Jean-Charles Boisset.

== Boisset Collection's wineries in North America ==
- Raymond Vineyards, Napa Valley
- Artesa Vineyards & Winery
- DeLoach Vineyards, Russian River Valley
- Buena Vista Winery
- Lockwood Vineyard, Monterey
- Lyeth Estate, Sonoma
- JCB by Jean-Charles Boisset
- La Face Cachee de la Pomme, Quebec

== Boisset Collection's wineries in France ==
- Domaine de la Vougeraie, Premeaux-Prissey, France
- Jean-Claude Boisset, Nuits-St.-Georges, France
- Bouchard Aine & Fils, Beaune, France
- J. Moreau & Fils, Chablis, France
- Mommessin, Beaujolais, France
- Louis Bouillot, Nuits-St.-Georges, France
- Ropiteau, Meursault, France
- Fortant, Sete, France
- Antonin Rodet, Mercurey, France
