= Russian River Valley AVA =

American Viticultural Area in California

Coordinates: 38°31′09″N 122°50′39″W

Russian River Valley
- Wine region
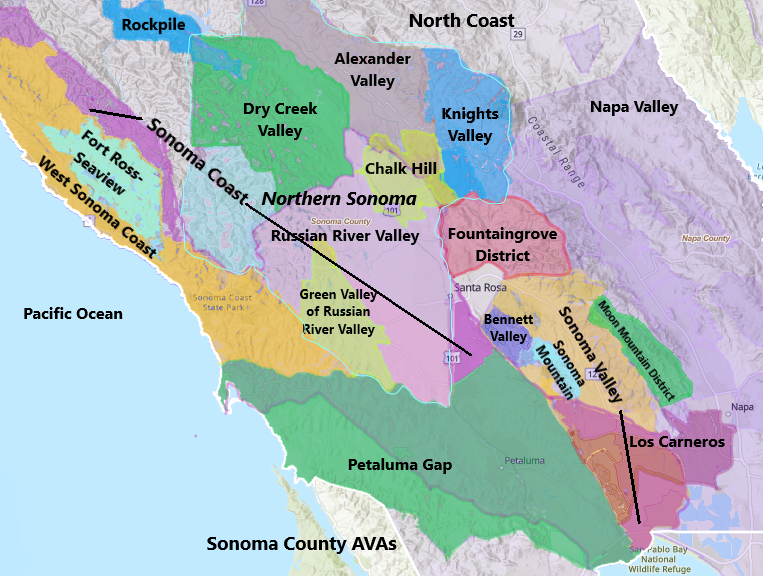
- Type: American Viticultural Area
- Year established: 1983; 2003 Amend; 2005 Amend; 2011 Amend
- Country: United States
- Part of: California, North Coast AVA, Sonoma County, Northern Sonoma AVA, Sonoma Coast AVA
- Sub-regions: Chalk Hill AVA, Green Valley of Russian River Valley AVA
- Growing season: 215 days
- Climate region: Region I-II
- Heat units: 2,000-2,800 {GDD units
- Soil conditions: Huichica Loam, Yolo Clay Loam, and Yolo Silt Loam
- Total area: 96,000 acres (150 sq mi); 96,767 acres (151 sq mi); 126,967 acres (198 sq mi); 141,011 acres (220 sq mi)
- Size of planted vineyards: 16,000 acres (6,500 ha)
- No. of vineyards: 70
- Grapes produced: Alicante Bouschet, Arneis, Barbera, Black Muscat, Cabernet Franc, Cabernet Sauvignon, Canaiolo Nero, Carignane, Chardonnay, Chenin Blanc, Cinsault, Dolcetto, Early Burgundy, Freisa, Gewurztraminer, Grenache, Malbec, Mammolo, Marsanne, Merlot, Muscat Canelli, Petit Verdot, Petite Sirah, Pinot Blanc, Pinot Gris, Pinot Meunier, Pinot Noir, Pinotage, Roussanne, Sangiovese, Sauvignon Blanc, Semillon, Syrah, Trousseau Gris, Viognier, Zinfandel

Russian River Valley is an American Viticultural Area (AVA) in Sonoma County, California located in the Russian River Valley landform. The wine appellation was established on October 21, 1983, as the nation's 53rd, the state's 34th and the county's sixth AVA by the Bureau of Alcohol, Tobacco and Firearms (ATF), Treasury after reviewing the petition submitted by the Appellation Committee, on behalf of twenty local vintners and growers, proposing an approximately 150 sq mi (96,000-acre) viticultural area in Sonoma County to be known as "Russian River Valley."

The area generally lies between Sebastopol and Santa Rosa in the south, and Forestville and Healdsburg in the north. The Russian River Valley has a characteristically cool climate, heavily affected by fog generated by the valley's proximity to the Pacific Ocean. The area is known for its success with cool climate varietals, notably Pinot Noir and Chardonnay. The plant hardiness zone ranges from 9a to 10a.

== History ==
Viticulture in Sonoma County dates back to the establishment of the last of the California missions, Mission San Francisco de Solano, at Sonoma in 1824. The vineyard at the mission was planted in 1825. In the late 1850s Jacob Gundlach and Count Agoston Haraszthy established major plantings of the European vine, vitis vinifera, the first such plantings in the United States.

Russian River Valley viticulture began when immigrants from Mediterranean countries descended upon the region and began planting vines. While most vineyards were "gardens" for personal family consumption, commercial wineries sprung up shortly thereafter in 1876 when wine production in the area was in excess of 500,000 gallons and planted acreage totaled approximately 7,000 acres (2,800 ha) including Korbel Winery in 1882, Santa Rosa Wine Company in 1876, Martini & Prati Winery in 1880, and Foppiano Winery in 1896. In 1887, the editor of the "Sonoma Enterprise" wrote, "the famous Russian River and Dry Creek Valleys, tributary to Healdsburg, which is situated near the confluence of Dry Creek with Russian River comprise the cream of good soils that characterize 'Old Sonoma'. It is here that the largest and finest flavored fruits are grown and where the choicest wine and table grapes are produced." In a "History of Sonama County, California", published in 1880, mention is made of the four "great valleys" comprising the Sonoma, Petaluma, Santa Rosa and the Russian River with "others smaller in size ... chief among them are: Alexander Valley, Dry Creek Valley ... ". The water courses describe Mark West Creek & Santa Rosa Creek emptying into the Russian River. The watershed some twenty miles south of the Russian River drains northward into that river. By the dawn of the 20th century there were nearly 200 wineries operating.

The enactment of Prohibition dealt a devastating blow to the region with many wineries going out of business. Some winemaking families continued to make wine illegally and others converted to bootlegging a sugar and water base wine known as "Jackass brandy" to survive during this period. One of the most prestigious vineyards in the region is the Jackass Hill Vineyard owned by Martinelli Winery. By the Repeal of Prohibition the few vineyards that were operating would sell their grapes to bulk jug wine producers. It would not be until the 1970s that vineyards in the Russian River region would begin to focus on quality wine production and begin using their grapes for local bottlings. The 1973 vintages of Foppiano Vineyards claims to be the first wines to include the words "Russian River" on their wine labels. The winery giants of E & J Gallo and Kendall Jackson invested significantly in the region in the late 20th century with Gallo purchasing the large Laguna Ranch Vineyard for its flagship "premium" Chardonnay under its Gallo of Sonoma label in 1970 and purchasing the Twin Valley Ranch once owned by actor Fred MacMurray for its MacMurray Ranch label. Gallo's rival Kendall Jackson pumped more than $12 million into updating and establishing its La Crema label in the Russian River region.

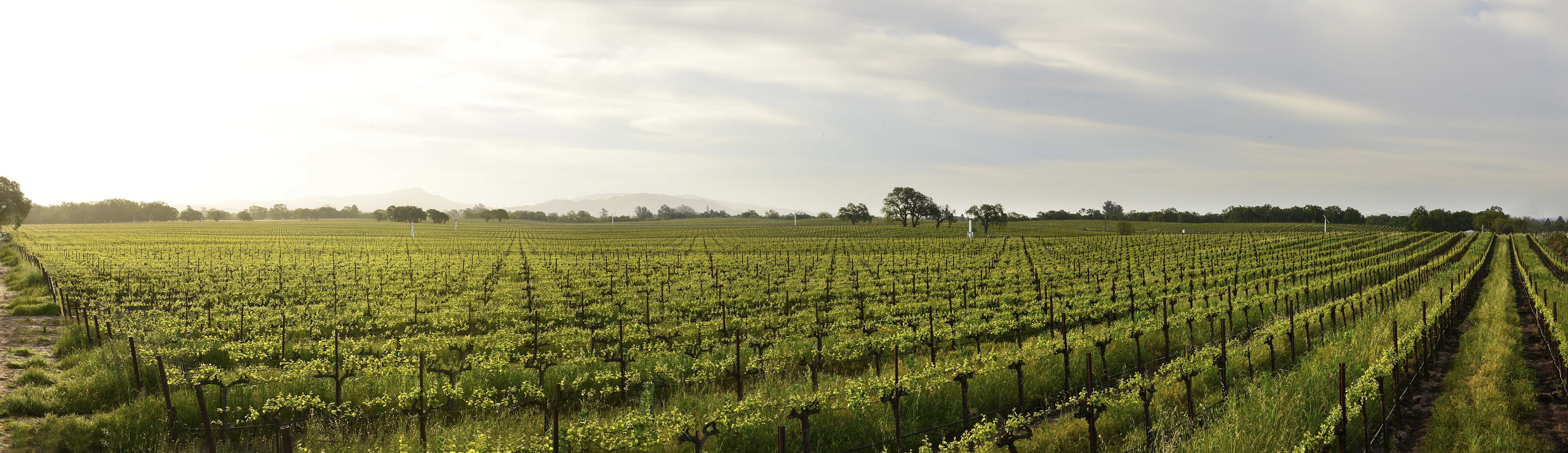
Russian River Valley vineyard

In 1983, the Russian River Valley appellation was established. Over time the region began to develop a reputation for the quality of its Chardonnay and Pinot Noir for both still and sparkling wine production. In the late 1990s and early 21st century, as the popularity for Pinot Noir grew, the region saw an explosion of investment with Pinot plantings jumping from 4,000 acres (1,600 ha) to over 12,000 acres (4,900 ha) by 2003. The Freeman Vineyard & Winery was founded in 2001.

The use of the name "Russian River Valley" on wine labels began with Foppiano Winery in 1970, followed by Mark West Vineyards in 1977, Davis Bynum in 1978 and DeLoach Vineyards in 1979. The most recent "Connoisseur's Guide" states that "as an appelation of origin ... the name Russian River Valley has commonly been used to describe the low lying flat plain that extends south and west of Healdsburg and follows the river as it turns toward the Pacific Ocean. At Guerneville the coastal hills close off the area and mark its western boundary. Plantings are oriented to early ripening varieties...".

== Boundary disputes ==
Boundary of the Russian River Valley AVA along the Russian River

The Russian River AVA has had a number of disputes regarding the expansion and revision of the appellation boundaries. The Russian River Valley Winegrowers (RRVW) is a community of winemakers and farmers dedicated to producing exceptional wines that showcase the diversity of the Russian River Valley neighborhoods. In 1997, the RRVW attempted to expand the AVA to include the town of Cotati in the southeast corner of Sonoma County. The ATF rejected the proposal for being too broad in scope. In 1999, RRVW filed a new proposal to revise the boundaries based on the influences of coastal fog. Under this proposal the warmer Chalk Hill sub-appellation, which has little fog influence, would be excluded from the Russian River Valley AVA and more acreage along the southwest corner of the appellation would be added. That proposal was also later rejected. In January 2003, a petition was submitted proposing to add 767 acres (310 ha) on the southwestern end near the Green Valley region. This expansion was approved in December that year.

In 2008, E & J Gallo petitioned for a further expansion of Russian River Valley in the southwestern corner of 14,000 acres (22 sq mi) that would include the winery's Two Rock Vineyard located along the Highway 101 corridor near Cotati. If approved, the petition would expand the total acreage to 169,000 acres (264 sq mi). When initially proposed, the Russian River Valley Winegrowers voted unanimously to oppose the expansion on the grounds that the expansion is climatically different from the rest of the Russian River Valley area. Gallo contested that opinion and after changes in leadership the RRVW officially took a neutral stance on the proposal though some vocal opposition still existed. At a meeting of the members on December 9, 2008, the RRVW opposed the proposed expansion.

== Terroir ==
=== Geography ===
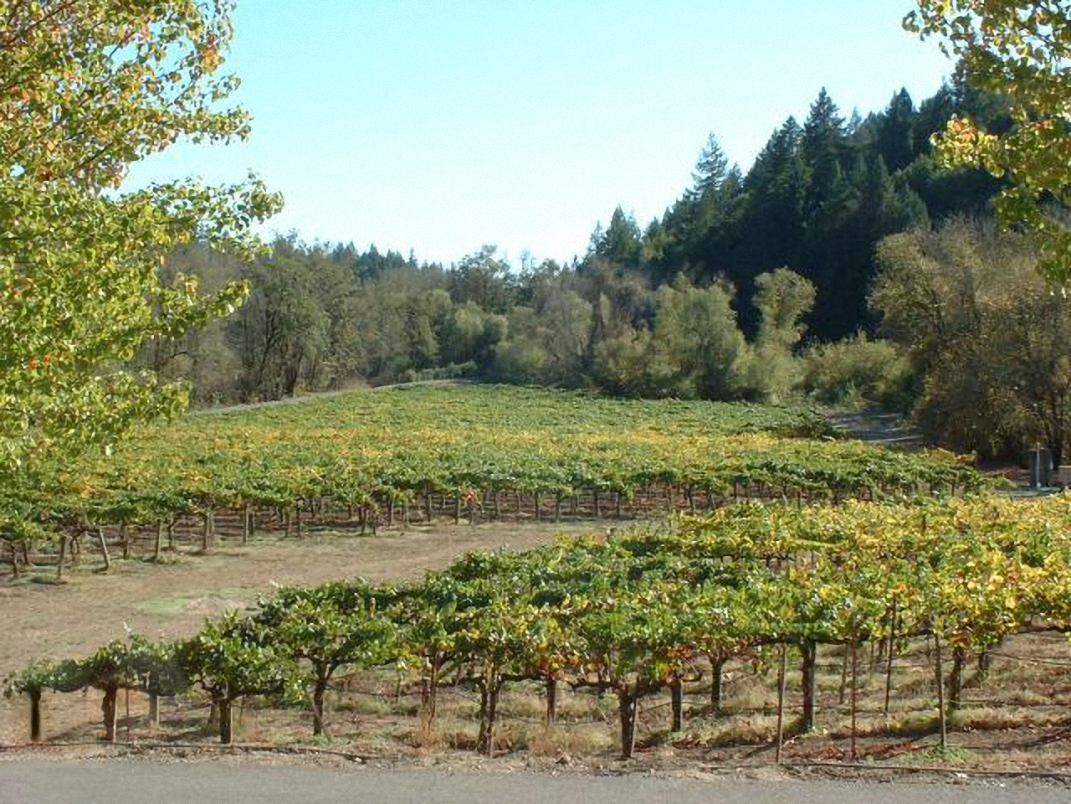
Russian River Valley vineyard

Despite its name, the Russian River Valley AVA does not cover the entire Russian River Valley—which extends north into Mendocino County, California and southwest all the way to the Pacific Ocean. Originally the river continued south and emptied into San Francisco Bay but during its history, for reasons not yet understood by geologists, the river changed course. The small segment of the river valley that makes up the AVA begins near Healdsburg once the river leaves the Alexander Valley region through a narrow gorge in the foothills of the Mayacamas Mountains. From there it extends south to the Santa Rosa Plains and Sebastopol and west to the towns of Monte Rio, Guerneville and Occidental. Within the boundaries of the Russian River AVA are the sub-appellations Chalk Hill and Sonoma Green Valley. In 2003 the AVA was expanded to include 767 acres (310 ha) south of Fulton. Elevations in the expansion area range from 130 to 160 feet (40–49 m), with a gentle rise from southwest to northeast, according to the two USGS topographic maps covering the expansion area. These elevations are similar to those found in the portion of the established Russian River Valley viticultural area immediately adjacent to the expansion area.

=== Soils ===
The geography of the Russian River Valley was shaped millions of years ago by collisions between the North American and Pacific tectonic plates and eruptions by volcanic vents that deposited volcanic ash over layers of eroded bedrock. This created sandstone of loam known as "Goldridge soil". Some of the area's most respected and Chardonnay vineyards are planted along deposits of Goldridge soil. Near the town of Sebastopol, a different soil that is more clay based, known as "Sebastopol soil" has also shown itself to work well with Pinot noir due to its ability to retain less water than Goldridge soil. This soil was created by water flowing off the Sonoma Mountains that carried with it clay deposits. A third soil type, found close to the river, is predominantly alluvial and makes up the benchland regions of the river. The predominant soils of the Russian River Valley viticultural area are Huichica Loam, Yolo Clay Loam, and Yolo Silt Loam, as depicted on the Sonoma County Soil Survey map (USDA, 1972), in the petition. These soils are also found in vineyards to the north of the expansion area.

=== Climate ===
With parts of the AVA less than 10 miles (16 km) from the Pacific, the climate of the Russian River viticultural area is characterized by cool morning fog that flows in from the ocean through the Petaluma Gap and burns off during the day. The cooling influence of the fog is responsible for the large diurnal temperature variation with nighttime temperatures dropping as much as 35 to 40 °F (2 to 4 °C) from daytime highs. The Russian River is a rain-fed waterway that swells in the wintertime and provides vital irrigation to the region's vineyards during the dry season in late spring. During the summer, the season heat is tempered by the maritime influence of fog that facilitates a long, slow ripening period and limits the risk of over ripeness or "baked" flavors in the grapes. Harvest in the Russian River region often occurs at later dates than in its neighboring regions. The central and western reaches of the AVA have the coolest climate and tend to be concentrated with Pinot Noir and Chardonnay plantings. The eastern region, located near Highway 101 and includes the Chalk Hill sub-appellation, are the warmest area of Russian River AVA since its the furthest from the ocean.

== Grape varieties ==
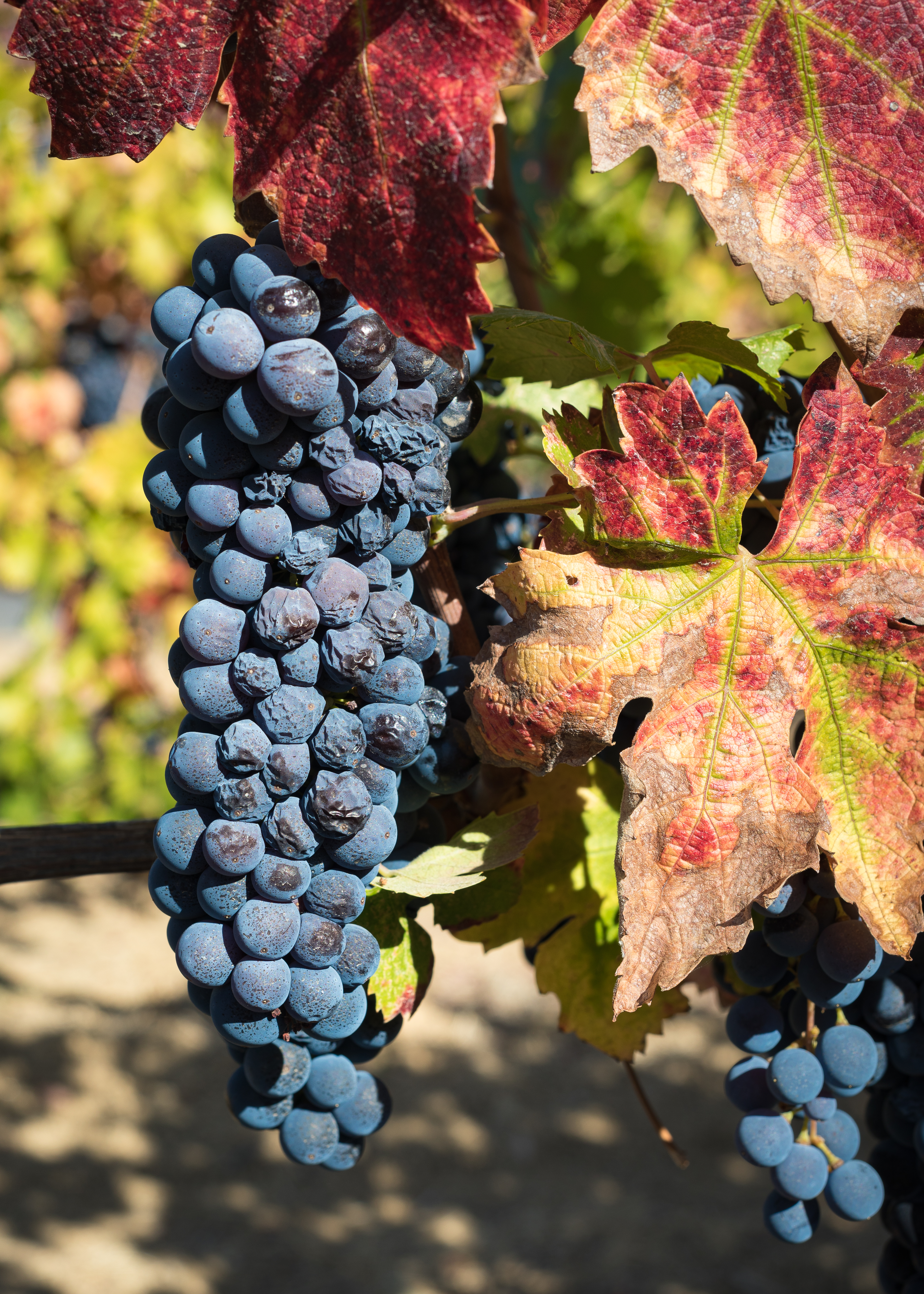
Ripe Zinfandel grapes

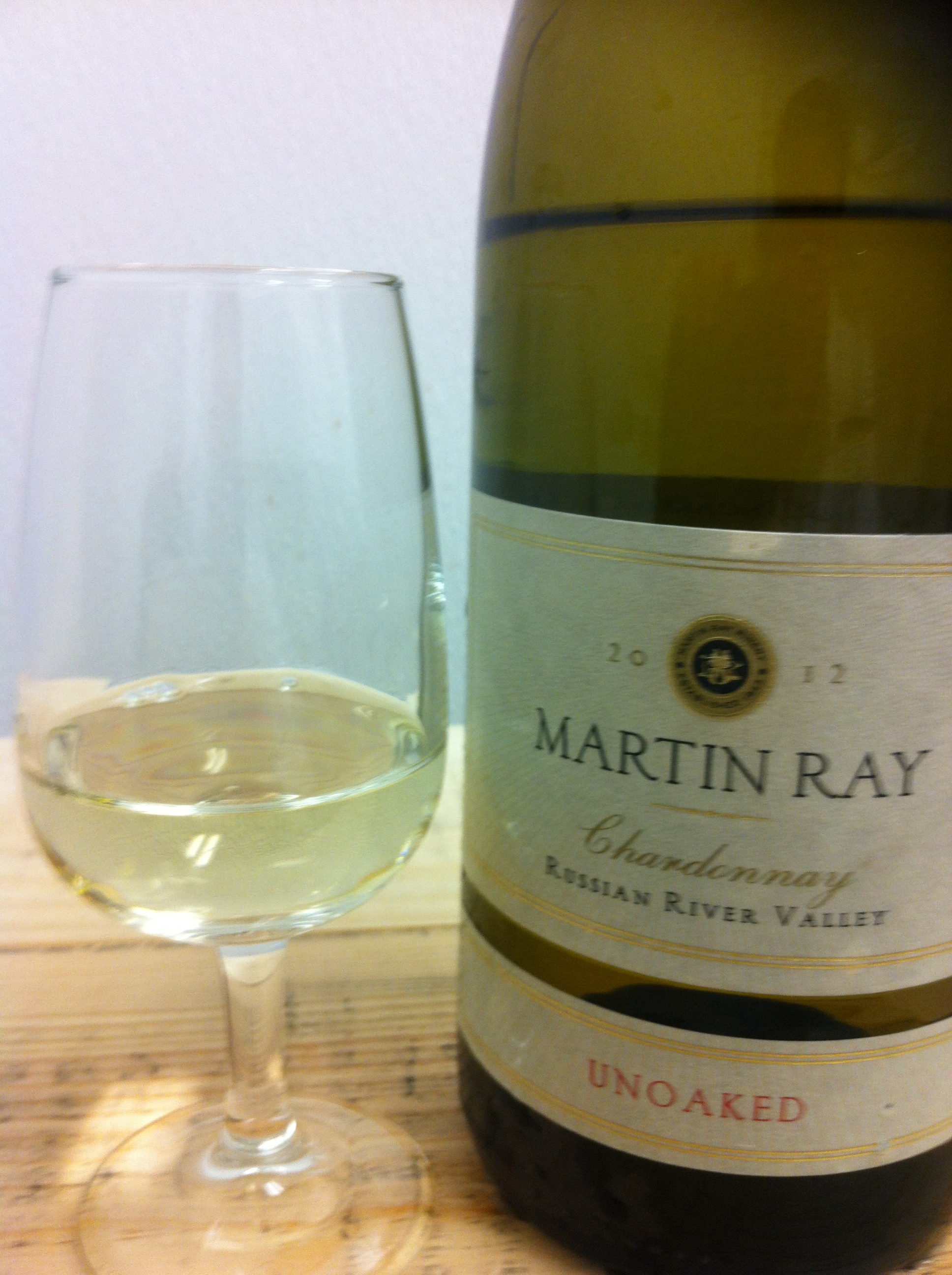
Unoaked Chardonnay

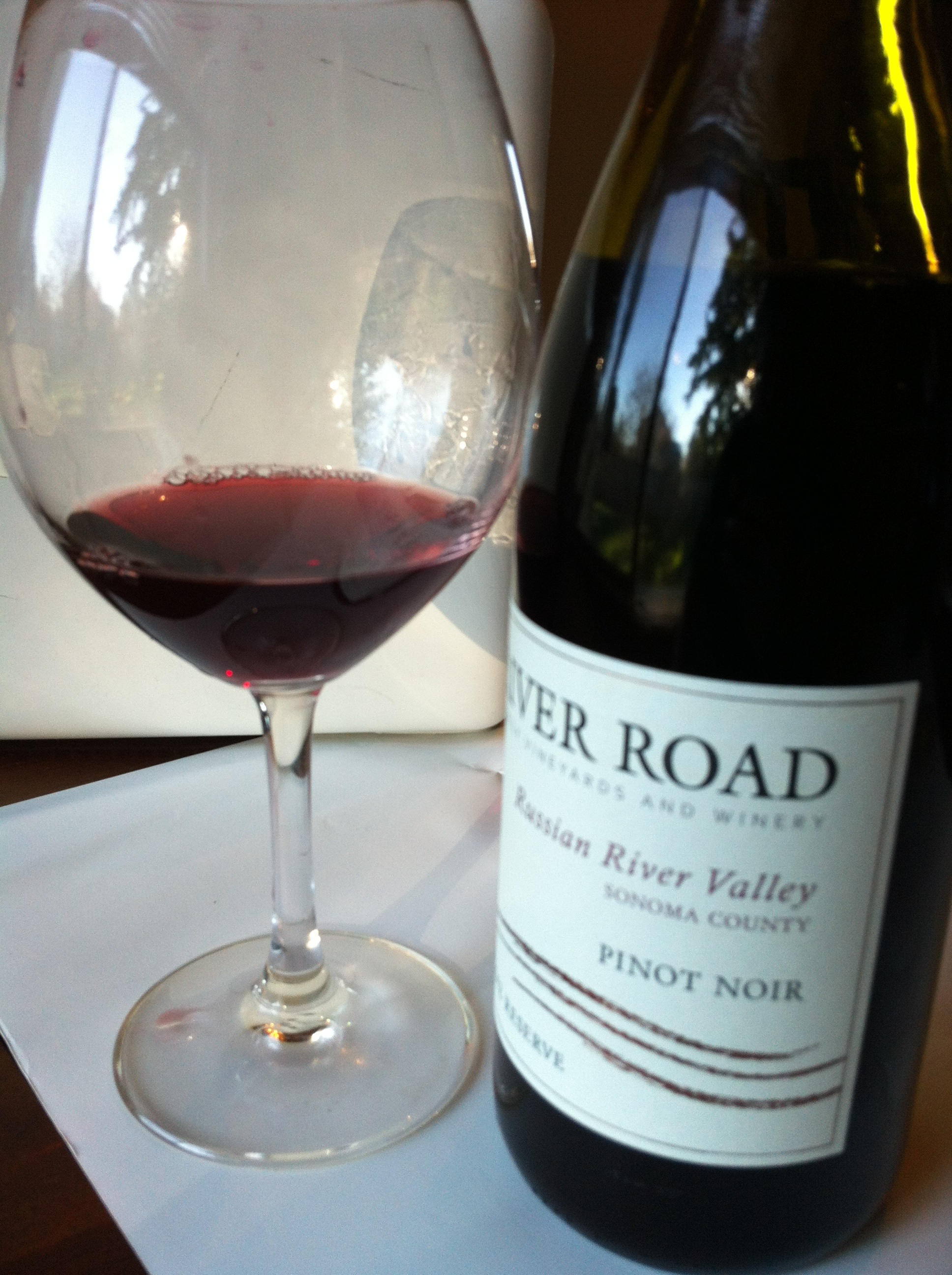
Russian River Valley Pinot Noir

According to the Russian River Valley Winegrowers, 42 percent of the grapes harvested in the region are Chardonnay, while 29 percent are Pinot noir. While the region is predominantly associated with Chardonnay and Pinot noir, hillside vineyard locations have shown success with other varieties such as Syrah and Zinfandel. Within the AVA there are several microclimates that allow for suitable plantings of Sauvignon Blanc, Gewürztraminer, Petite Sirah, Cabernet Franc and Merlot. In warmer areas of Chalk Hill there have been successful plantings of Cabernet Sauvignon. Even for these non-Burgundian varietals, the nature of the Russian River Valley's cool climate can be seen in the wine. For example, Russian River Merlots tend to have distinctive tea-like note and Zinfandels tend to exhibit more tart red fruit than Zinfandels from the warmer Dry Creek Valley. While Sauvignon Blanc from the region tend to be slightly less "grassy" they still tend to exhibit herbal and citrus lime aroma. Despite its close proximity, the Russian River AVA produces Chardonnays that are dramatically different from those found in the Alexander Valley AVA. The region's cool climate produces more grapes with higher acidity that tend to be more balanced than the fatter, creamy style found in the Alexander Valley. Grapes from the Russian River and smaller Green Valley areas have been prized by sparkling wine producers for their crispness and high quality.

=== Pinot noir ===
As of 2008, the Russian River Valley accounted for nearly 19% of all the Pinot noir plantings in California and 10% of all grape varieties planted in Sonoma County. Older clones planted in the mid to late 20th century, including the Martini, Swan, Pommard, and 115 clones, produced a "classic" style of Russian River Pinots that were characterized by vibrant (but pale) color, lively acidity, cherry and berry fruit flavors and delicate aroma that would often include earthy mushroom notes. While that style had it share of fans, the lack of coloring would be a factor in poor score wine ratings from wine critics. In response to these poor scores, some Russian River winemakers altered their techniques in order to enhance the color. These techniques ranged from blending in the darker color Alicante Bouschet and Syrah or the red wine concentrate known as "Mega Purple", to extended maceration and oak extraction that added more weight and extraction of phenolic compounds that add color to the wine. Other winemakers altered some of their viticultural practices in the vineyards, including adopting new trellising systems that allowed for more leaf removal which exposed the grapes to more sunlight. In addition to enhancing some of the color producing phenols, the new trellising also served to increase sugar content (and subsequently alcohol levels) and decrease the amount of the green tasting pyrazine compounds found in the grapes. The style of Pinot noir produced from these techniques tend to be heavier, more full bodied and almost "Syrah-like".
