= Monopole (wine) =

Area controlled by a single winery

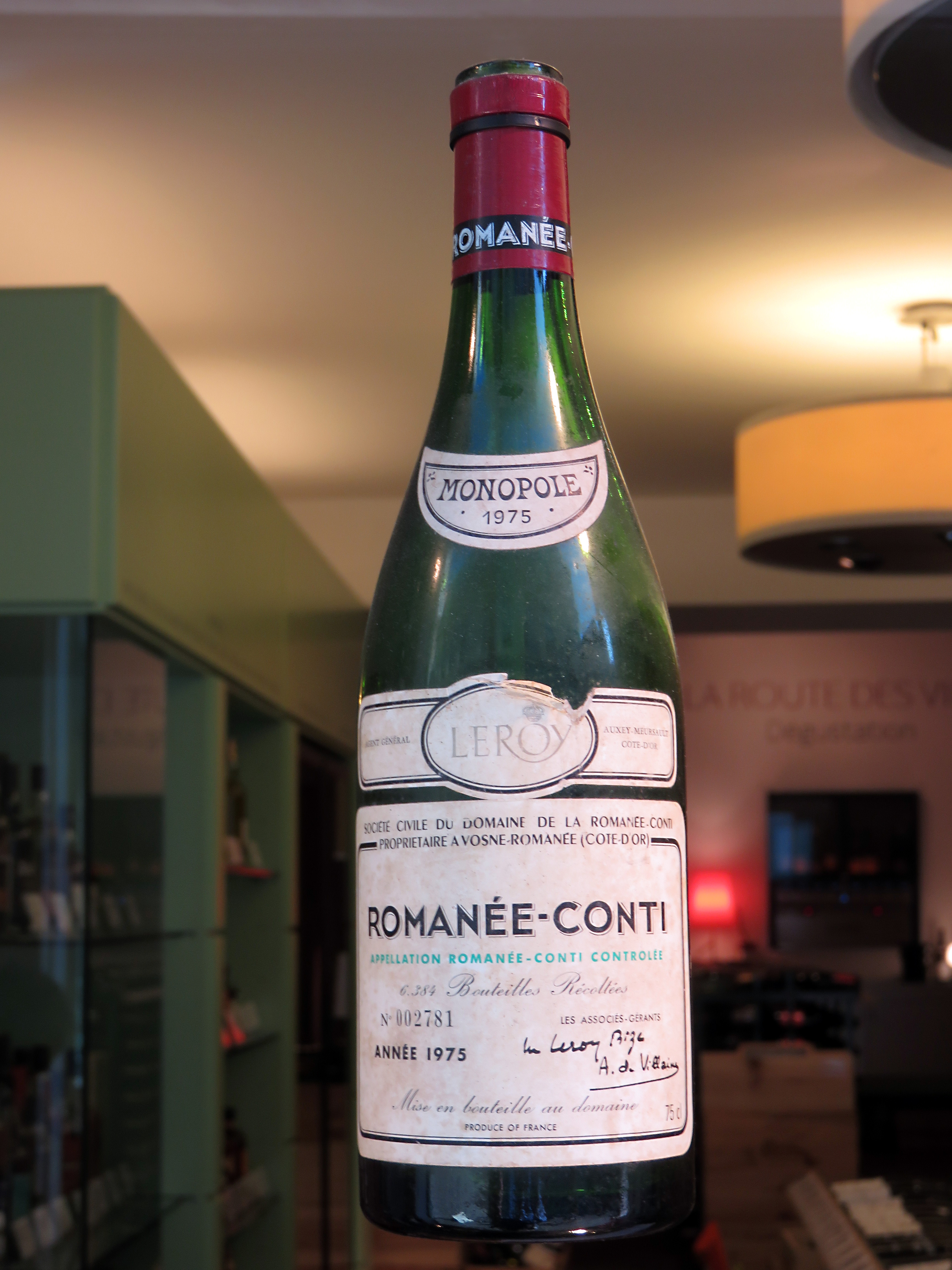
La Romanée-Conti, marked as monopole

A monopole (from French 'monopole') is an area controlled by a single winery (wine company) and can be as small as a named vineyard (lieu-dit) or as large as an entire appellation d'origine contrôlée (AOC). Frequently this is mentioned on the label as it is rare for only one winery to produce all the wine from an area entitled to a certain name. Each wine is sold by only one company.

The Napoleonic inheritance laws typically caused vineyards to be so finely divided among inheritors – down to even a single row of vines – that négociants are needed to bottle commercial quantities of a wine. Whether a monopole indicates a wine of unusual quality or not is a matter of debate.

== List of monopoles ==
=== Burgundy ===
Vineyard Name	Class	Commune (Village)	Owner
Chablis "La Moutonne"		Chablis	Albert Bichot (Domaine Long Depaquit)
Les Ruelles	Premier Cru	Mercurey	Château de Chamirey
La Mission	Premier Cru	Mercurey	Château de Chamirey
Clos des Monts Luisants	Premier Cru	Morey-Saint-Denis	Domaine Ponsot
Ruchottes-Chambertin "Clos des Ruchottes"	Grand Cru	Gevrey-Chambertin	Domaine Armand Rousseau
Clos de Tart	Grand Cru	Morey-Saint-Denis	Clos de Tart (Owned by Francois Pinault of Latour, who purchased from Mommessin in 2017)
Romanée-Conti	Grand Cru	Vosne-Romanée	Domaine de la Romanée-Conti
La Tâche	Grand Cru	Vosne-Romanée	Domaine de la Romanée-Conti
La Grande Rue	Grand Cru	Vosne-Romanée	Domaine François Lamarche
La Romanée	Grand Cru	Vosne-Romanée	Domaine du Comte Liger-Belair
Corton "Clos des Marechaudes"	Grand Cru	Aloxe-Corton	Albert Bichot
Corton "Clos des Cortons Faiveley"	Grand Cru	Aloxe-Corton	Domaine Faiveley
Clos des Porrets	Premier Cru	Nuits-Saint-Georges	Domaine Henri Gouges
Clos des Noiterons	Village	Mercurey	Château d'Etroyes (Protheau)
Clos Napoléon (previously aux Cheuzots)	Premier Cru	Fixin	Pierre Gelin
Clos Saint Landry	Premier Cru	Beaune	Bouchard Père & Fils
Clos de la Mousse	Premier Cru	Beaune	Bouchard Père & Fils
Clos des Réas	Premier Cru	Vosne-Romanée	Michel Gros
Clos des Corvées	Village	Mercurey	Château d'Etroyes (Protheau)
Le Clos de Thorey	Premier Cru	Nuits-Saint-Georges	Antonin Rodet
Clos de la Maréchale	Premier Cru	Nuits-Saint-Georges	Jacques Frederic Mugnier
La Bossiere	Premier Cru	Gevrey-Chambertin	Domaine Harmand Geoffroy
Savigny-Champ-Chevrey	Premier Cru	Savigny-lès-Beaune	Domaine Tollot-Beaut
Clos de l'ecu	Premier Cru	Beaune	Domaine Faiveley
Clos des Ursule	Premier Cru	Beaune	Maison Louis Jadot
Clos des Épeneaux	Premier Cru	Pommard	Comte Armand
Clos Marey-Monge	Village	Pommard	Château de Pommard
Fremiets Clos de la Rougeotte	Premier Cru	Volnay	Bouchard Père & Fils
Clos des Ducs	Premier Cru	Volnay	Marquis d'Angerville
Clos de la Bousse d'Or	Premier Cru	Volnay	La Pousse d'Or
Clos des 60 Ouvrées	Premier Cru	Volnay	La Pousse d'Or
Clos d'Audignac	Premier Cru	Volnay	La Pousse d'Or
Clos des Santenots	Premier Cru	Volnay	Domaine Jacques Prieur
Clos de la Chapelle	Premier Cru	Volnay	Domaine Clos de la Chapelle
Clos de la Barre	Premier Cru	Volnay	Maison Louis Jadot
Le Clos Blanc de Vougeot	Premier Cru	Vougeot	Domaine de la Vougeraie
Clos De Prieuré	Village	Vougeot	Domaine de la Vougeraie
Clos Saint Paul	Premier Cru	Givry	Domaine Silvestre Du Closel
Clos Salomon	Premier Cru	Givry	Gardin Perrotto (Domaine du Clos Salomon)
Clos des Myglands	Premier Cru	Mercurey	Domaine Faiveley
Clos de la Fontaine	Village	Vosne-Romanée	Anne Fraçoise Gros
La Montagne	Village	Vosne-Romanée	Bruno Clavelier
Clos des Langres	Village	Corgoloin	Domaine d'Ardhuy
Pièce du Chapître	Village	Savigny-lès-Beaune	Domaine Tollot-Beaut
Clos de la Chaume Gaufriot	Village	Beaune	Antonin Guyon
Clos des Ursulines	Village	Pommard	Albert Bichot (Domaine du Pavillon)
Clos la Marche	Village	Mercurey	Maison Louis Max
Clos des Chevaliers	Grand Cru	Puligny-Montrachet	Jean Chartron
Clos de la Mousse	Premier Cru	Beaune	Bouchard & Fils
Clos de la Mouchère	Premier Cru	Puligny-Montrachet	Domaine Henri Boillot
Le Meix Caillet	Premier Cru	Rully	Domaine Eric de Suremain
Agneux	Premier Cru	Rully	Domaine Eric de Suremain

=== Other regions ===
- Château-Grillet AOC, of Château Grillet.
- Savennières-Coulée-de-Serrant, owned by Nicolas Joly.
- Clos Ostler, in the Waitaki Valley, North Otago, New Zealand.

== See also ==
- Vineyard designated wine
