= Charles Finkel =

American entrepreneur

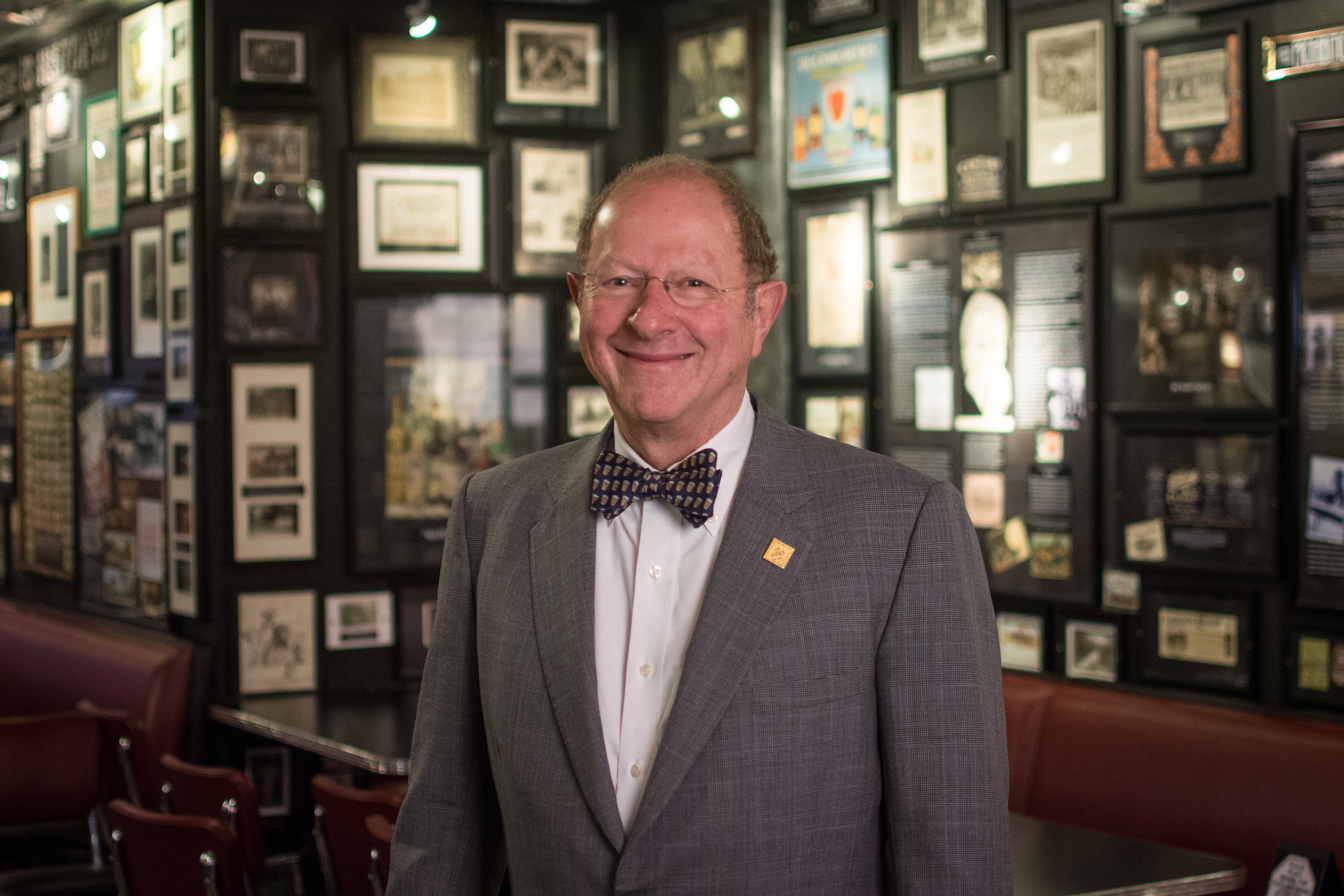
Charles Finkel, founder and owner of Pike Brewing Company

Charles Finkel (born September 25, 1943) is a designer, entrepreneur, artist and founder of Bon-Vin, Merchant du Vin, and Pike Brewing in Seattle. Charles began marketing wines from small family owned California wineries in the 1970s and was the first to market the wines of Washington state throughout the country. In an article in Wines and Vines Magazine in 1970, Finkel was the first to use the term "boutique wines" to describe small, family owned wines of quality.

He was the first importer to introduce Belgian beer along with craft beers from England, Scotland, Belgium, France, Norway, and Germany to America through Merchant du Vin. He designed the labels for beers including Ayinger Celebrator, Samuel Smith's Celebrated Oatmeal Stout, Organic Chocolate Stout, Imperial Stout and Winter Welcome, Lindemans Cuvée René, and Pike Brewing Company.

Charles has received a myriad of awards. In 2025, for his pioneering efforts and influence, Charles was named to the American Craft Beer Hall of Fame. He was married to Rose Ann Finkel, until her death in 2020.

== Early life ==
Charles was born into a Jewish family in Flushing, Queens, New York in 1943 and moved with his family to Broken Arrow, Oklahoma in 1947. His father worked for American Airlines in Tulsa, Oklahoma. During his youth, he traveled each year, (first class when space was available)from Tulsa to New York, and from Tulsa to San Francisco instilling a sense of adventure and love of the arts. From 1962 thru 1966 he studied design and marketing at University of Oklahoma. He was first introduced to wineries in Livermore, California and the Napa Valley in 1963. During his senior year in college, he managed Mayo Meadows Liquor Store where he distinguished himself in wine knowledge and resultant sales.

== Wine industry ==
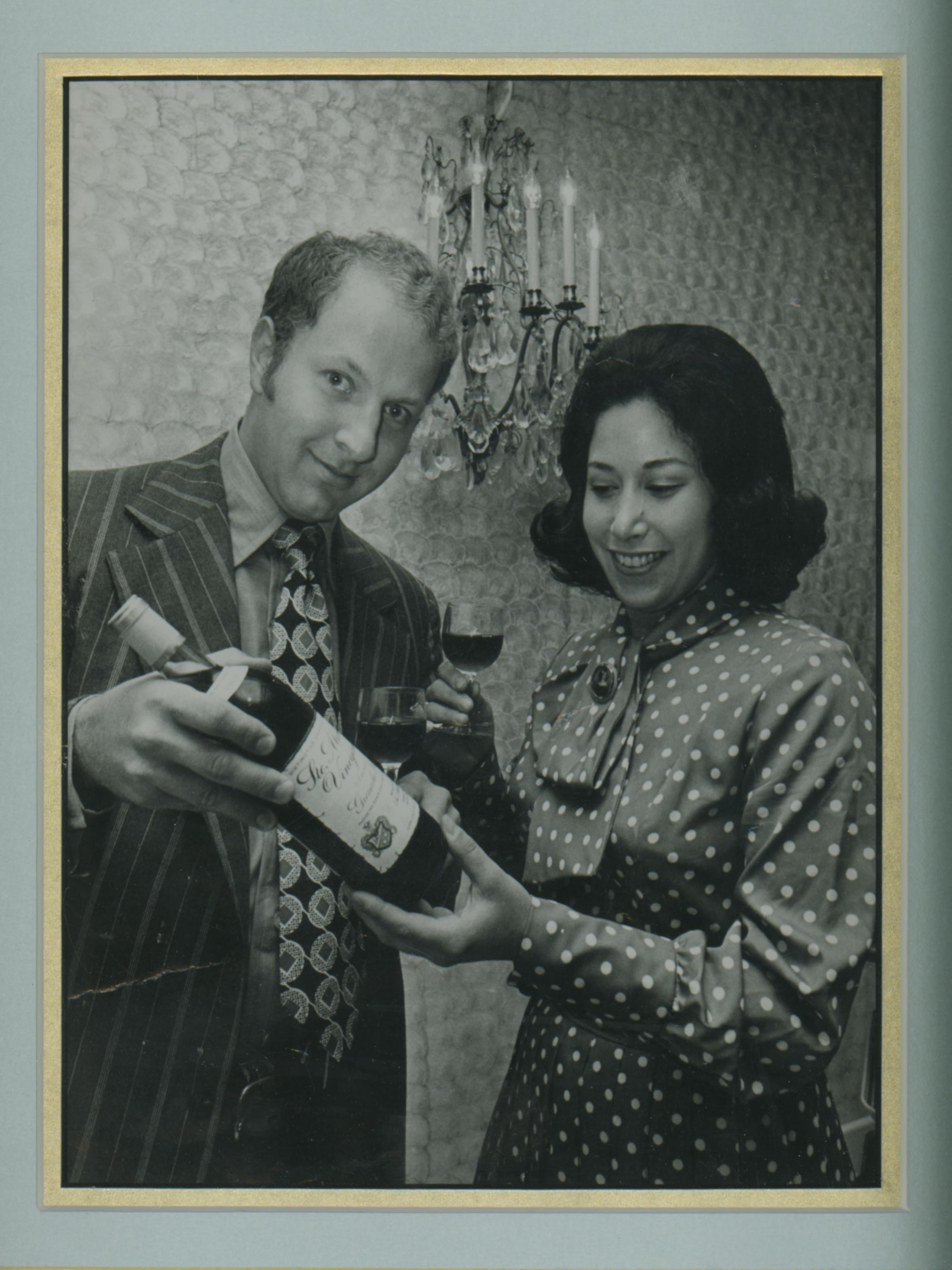
Charles and Rose Ann Finkel view a bottle of wine, circa 1972

In 1966 Finkel moved to New York to work for Monsieur Henri, a wine importer and wholesaler in NY and visited the wine growing regions in Spain, France, Germany and Portugal. Finkel met European wine merchants and vineyard owners who visited Monsieur Henri in NY. At age 25, he was named "salesmen of the year". In 1967 Monsieur Henri appointed him S.W. sales manager. Finkel relocated to Houston, where he met his wife, Rose Ann (née Martin).

In 1969 he founded his own wine importing company, Bon-Vin, Inc, with offices in Tulsa and Houston. The Houston Chronicle in September 1971 called Finkel and his business partner, Robert Conley, the "whiz kids of the wine world." Bon-Vin imported to America the wines of Chalonaise including Chateau de Chamirey, Mercurey, Clos Solomon Givry, Le Vieux Chateau Montagny and Veuve Amba sparkling Rully. In Bordeaux, they represented Descas Père et Fils, and pétits châteaux including Caronne Ste. Gemmme-Haut Medoc, Caillon-Grand Cru Classe Barsac, Milon- Pauillac, Lescours, Laniote, La Serre and Le Chatelet-St. Emilion, Junayme- Fronsac, Millet- Graves, La Rame- St. Croix du Mont, and Bourseau-Lalalnde de Pomerol. Vineyards from other French regions included Huet-Vouvray, La Noe- Muscadet, Maucoil and St. Pierre- Chateauneuf du Pape, Jan Bourdy-Jura, Bodegas Matines Laquesta-Rioja, Delafoce–Porto.

In 1973 Bon-Vin acquired Robert Philips Wine Importing Company of Stamford, Connecticut adding the wines of George and Ludwig Schmidt-Rhine wines, Blondel-Marchal-Champagne, J. Vidal Fleury-Rhone and Henriques and Henriques-Madiera.

In 1969 Bon-Vin became the exclusive agent for Ste. Michelle, now known as Château Ste. Michelle, in Washington state. During this time Finkel convinced the winery to change the appellation from "American" to "Washington State" and added a back label to bottles that shows the latitude of Washington State in comparison to the European wine growing regions.

In 1970 Bon-Vin and Finkel began representing emerging California wineries in Napa Valley, Sonoma, and Mendocino counties including Dry Creek, Z.D., Sutter Home, Ficklin, Kenwood, and Fetzer.

In 1974 Bon-Vin was acquired by U.S. Tobacco as part of their purchase of American Wine Growers, which included Ste. Michelle. Charles and Rose Ann moved to Seattle, Washington where Finkel was Vice President of Marketing at Château Ste. Michelle, part of the team that built the château in Woodinville, Washington. Because he had an interest in architecture, and had spent considerable time around French chateaux, Finkel contributed the chateau design which was followed by architect Chester Lindsay.

== Craft beer ==
=== Importing ===
In 1978 Finkel founded Merchant du Vin, a wine and beer importing company, based in Seattle, Washington. He was the exclusive agent for states west of the Mississippi for D.G. Yuengling brewery of Pottsville, Pennsylvania. As the exclusive U.S. importer, Merchant du Vin acted as the sole United States agent for English breweries Samuel Smith Old Brewery and Melbourn Bros; German breweries Brauerei Ayinger and Pinkus Müller and Belgian breweries Orval, Lindemans, St.Bernardus, and Rodenbach.

According to Michael Jackson in Ultimate Beer, "Portland and Seattle are the top two craft-beer markets in the world. Perhaps because the beer-importer Merchant du Vin was located in Seattle, that city's restaurants were among the first in the nation to add specialty beers to their menus." Pioneer brewer Bert Grant wrote in his autobiography, The Ale Master Grant, Bert (1988). The Ale Master. Sasquatch Books. ISBN 0935503196., "Give Charlie some credit for importing all those wild beers. He sort of primed the pump so that when the microbrewed beers showed up, people were prepared to taste something different." Market Watch Magazine called Merchant du Vin "America's most impressive specialty beer importers."

The book Brewing in Seattle notes, "An entire book could be dedicated to the influence Charles Finkel and his wife, Rose Ann, had over not just Seattle's brewing culture but the entire American craft brewing industry. Before establishing Pike Place Brewery in 1989, the two had already created America's first boutique wine importing business and later a beer importing company that first introduced America to many of the most popular beer styles in craft brewing today."

=== Pike Brewing Company ===
Charles and Rose Ann founded Pike Place Brewery (now known as Pike Brewing) in 1989, tapping the first keg, along with Franz Inselkammer, Brau Von Aying, on October 17, 1989. The brewery originally shared space with Liberty Malt Supply Co. at 1432 Western in the LaSalle Hotel building in Pike Place Market. Liberty Malt Supply Co., purchased from John Farias, was a home brewing and wine making shop and mail order retailer established in 1921. The tile, copper and stainless steel brewery had a four barrel copper kettle hand-crafted by Seattle's Alaskan Copper and Brass and Jason Parker was the Head Brewer. Original beers brewed included Pike Place Ale and Pike XXXXX Extra Stout. At the time Finkel sold the brewery, they had brewed IPA longer than any other American brewery.

Pike Place Brewery and Liberty Malt Supply moved to 1415 First Avenue, Seattle, WA in 1996, a three-story gravity-flow 30 barrel steam brew house adding The Pike Pub and Microbrewery Museum. The brewery's name was also changed to Pike Brewing Company. Pike Brewing Company, The Pike Pub and Liberty Malt Supply, as a part of Merchant du Vin, were sold in 1997. The pub and brewery continued but Liberty Malt Supply was closed.

Charles and Rose Ann Finkel reacquired Pike, including The Pike Pub and brewery, on May 1, 2006. After Rose Ann's death, Charles sold a majority of Pike to Seattle Hospitality Group under Howard Wright. He left Pike in 2025, and now spends his time working on Charles Finkel Design, creating graphics, writing, and painting.

== Personal life ==
Finkel met Rose Ann Martin at a wine tasting in Houston, Texas in 1968, they were married in 1969. They had two children. Together they were the Seattle Slow Food Convivium Leaders from 1999 to 2004, and served on the national board of The Weizmann Institute of Science during the same period. Finkel judged the Slow Food Awards in Bologna, Italy in 2001 and in Torino, Italy in 2003 and has served on the boards of Planned Parenthood of The Great Northwest and Hawaiian Islands and The Epiphany School in Seattle. Rose Ann is memorialized with the Rose Ann Finkel Diversity in Brewing Scholarship at Washington State University. She was named posthumously as a Woman of Influence by the Puget Sound Business Journal in 2021, and, along with her husband, to the Craft Beer Hall of Fame in 2025.

== Awards ==
1997 – Lifetime Achievement Award at the Midwest International Beer Expo's Legends of Beer dinner. Master of ceremonies was the beer authority, Michael Jackson. He described Finkel as "one of the most influential people in the beer marketing world."

1998 – Recognition Award from the Brewers Association

2011 – Named one of '10 Beer Innovators' by DRAFT Magazine

2012 - Keynote speaker at National Homebrew Conference, Bellevue, WA

2014 – Named a 'Culinary Trailblazer' by Puget Sound Business Journal

2015 – Pellegrini Foundation Award winners,

2016 – Named to 'Seattle's Food & Beverage Hall of Fame' by Seattle Magazine

2026 - Keynote speaker, WSU Carson College of Business School of Hospitality, Burtenshaw Lecture

== Writing ==
2000 – Published The Brewer's Companion by Randy Mosher

2011 - Art Curator for Oxford Companion to Beer

2024 - Forward, Distilled in Washington: A History. 2024 - Outstanding Graduate, Broken Arrow High School, Broken Arrow, Oklahoma 2025 Inducted into the integral group of 13 individuals, including Rose Ann Finkel, forming the American Craft Beer Hall of Fame
