= Michael Baum =

Michael Baum may refer to:

- Michael Baum (surgeon) (born 1937), British surgeon and academic
- Michael Baum (entrepreneur) (born 1962), American businessman, investor and philanthropist
