= Faiveley =

Faiveley may refer to:

- Faiveley Transport, rail transport equipment manufacturer
- Domaine Faiveley, a wine producer
