= Maison Louis Max =

Winery in France

Maison Louis Max is a French wine producer from Burgundy, France founded in 1859 based in Nuits-Saint-Georges.

== History ==
In 1859, Evgueni Louis Max, the son of a producer of Georgian wine moved to Nuits-Saint-Georges at the heart of Burgundy and founded his wine company. Despite phylloxera, the worldwide grapevine pest at the time, development of the company went well and in 1889, Theodore Max, son of Evgueni, and company director at the time, built the factory Rue de Chaux, consisting of new offices, a tasting room and wine cellar providing two storeys of room for the aging of wine, which is still being used today.

During the first half of the 20th century, Louis Max strengthened its reputation and presence in Côte-d'Or. After World War II Louis Max expanded by acquiring numerous properties, including Domaine la Marche in Mercurey and properties in the South of France.

In 2007 Louis Max changed its direction and production process. The company laid more emphasis on viticulture and organic farming to produce the best grapes, following the saying "to produce good wines, you need the best grapes".

== Vineyards ==
Louis Max owns the following vineyards:

- Le Clos la Marche (monopoly) in Mercurey
- Les Rochelles in Mercurey
- Mercurey 1er Cru les Vasees
- Mercurey les Caudroyes
- Chateau Pech-Latt in Corbières
- Domaine la Lyre in Côtes-du-Rhône
