= Château de Chamirey =

Wine producer in Burgundy, France

Coordinates: 46.825°N 4.735°E

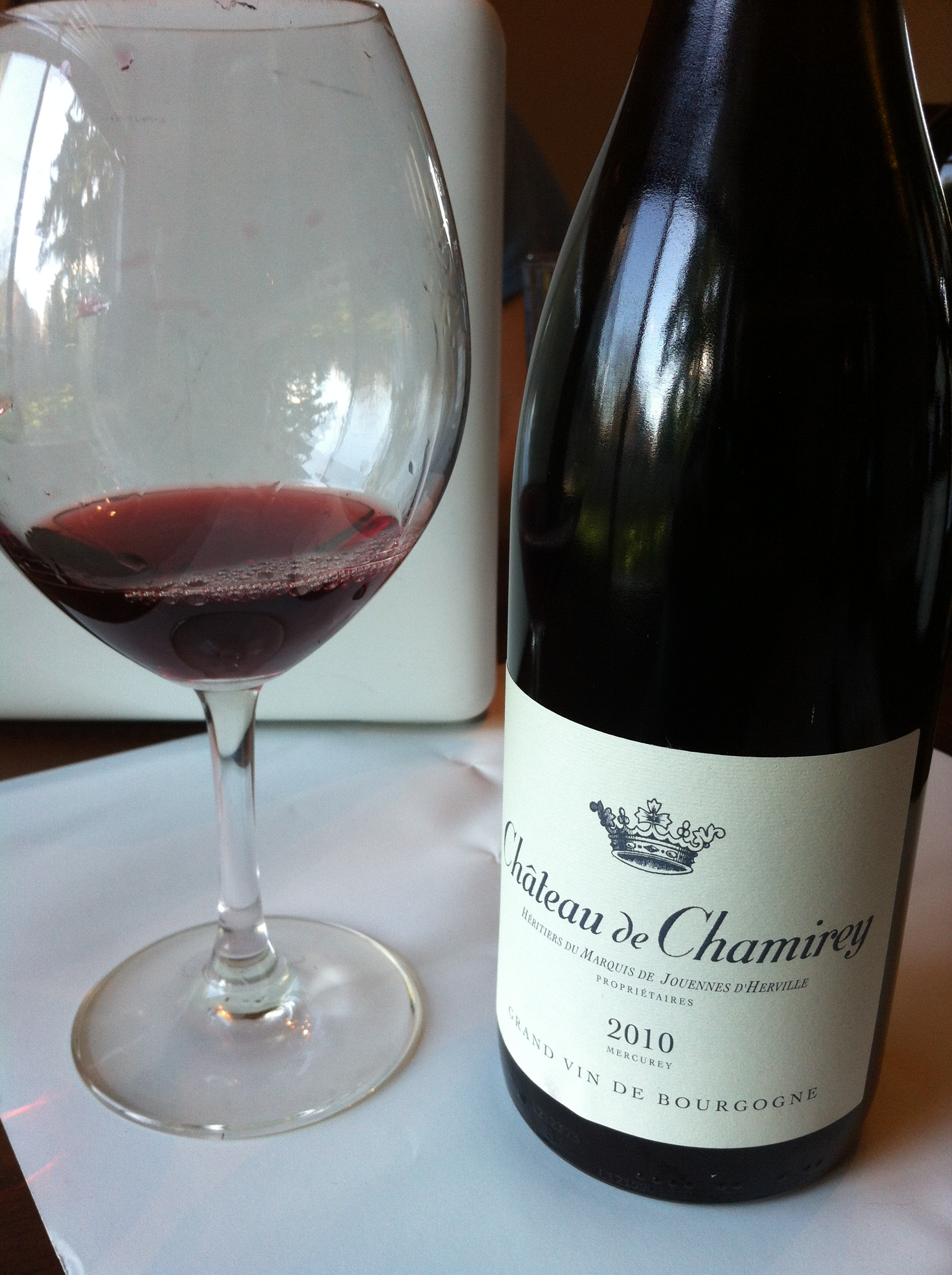
- Location: Mercurey, France
- First vintage: 1934 (91 years ago)
- Parent company: Domaine Devillard
- Cases/yr: Approximately 14,500
- Known for: Les Ruelles 1^{er} cru rouge, La Mission 1^{er} cru blanc
- Varietals: Pinot noir, Chardonnay
- Tasting: by appointment
- Website: http://www.chamirey.com/

Château de Chamirey is a wine producer in the town of Mercurey, in Burgundy, France, that produces white and red wine. They are best known for their Monopole wines, the Les Ruelles 1^{er} cru red and the La Mission 1^{er} cru white. The estate holds 37.7 hectares (93 acres) in Mercurey. 8.55 hectares (21.1 acres) of the estate's holdings are premier cru, of which 3.3 hectares (8.2 acres) are monopole vineyards

== History ==
The château dates back to the early 18th century. At the end of the 18th century, a fire destroyed the adjacent chapel.

The château was acquired by the Marquis de Jouennes in 1932 and in 1934 he decided to begin estate bottling at Château de Chamirey. His son-in-law, Bertrand Devillard, took over the estate after that, and expanded the holdings to their present size.

Today, Amaury and Aurore Devillard, the grandchildren of Marquis de Jouennes, own the estate. The property is also used as a bottling facility for other Domaine Devillard owned estates, including Domaine de Perdrix, Domaine de la Ferte, Domaine du Cellier aux Moines and Domaine de La Garenne.

== Vineyards, viticulture, and winemaking ==
=== Les Ruelles Premier Cru ===
Les Ruelles is a monopole of Château de Chamirey. The wine is made from hand-harvested, destemmed grapes, with fermentation taking place in open tanks over 15–18 days. It is aged in barrels, 25% of which are new. 100% malolactic fermentation takes place.

Grape variety: Pinot noir
Vineyard holding: 2.5 hectares (6.2 acres)

=== La Mission Premier Cru ===
La Mission is a monopole of Château de Chamirey. The wine is made from hand-harvested grapes. It is entirely fermented and aged in barrels, 30% of which are new. 100% malolactic fermentation takes place.

Grape variety: Chardonnay
Vineyard holding: 1.8 hectares (4.4 acres)

=== Clos du Roi Premier Cru ===
Clos du Roi is made from hand-harvested, destemmed grapes, with fermentation taking place in open tanks over 15–18 days. It is aged in barrels, 50% of which are new. 100% malolactic fermentation takes place.

Grape variety: Pinot noir
Vineyard holding: 3.3 hectares (8.2 acres)

=== Château de Chamirey Mercurey Rouge ===
The Château's village-level red wine is made from grapes harvested from a dozen vineyards, including 4 premier cru—Champs Martins, Clos l'Evêque, En Sazeney, and Clos du Roi. The wine is made from hand-harvested, destemmed grapes, with fermentation taking place in open tanks over 15–18 days. It is aged in barrels, 30 to 40% of which are new. 100% malolactic fermentation takes place.

Grape variety: Pinot noir
Vineyard holding: 19.97 hectares (49.3 acres)

=== Château de Chamirey Mercurey Blanc ===
The Château's village-level white wine is made from grapes harvested from five vineyards. The wine is made from hand-harvested grapes. 15% of it is fermented and aged in barrels, 10% of which are new. 100% malolactic fermentation takes place.

Grape variety: Chardonnay
Vineyard holding: 10.13 hectares (25.0 acres)

== See also ==
- French wine
