= Lucette Desvignes =

French writer (1926–2024)

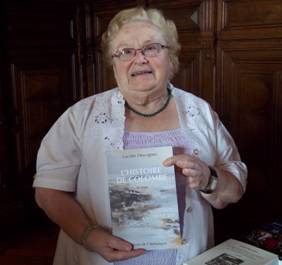
- Desvignes in 2010
- Born: May 1, 1926; Mercurey (Saône-et-Loire), France
- Died: February 14, 2024 (aged 97)
- Occupations: Novelist; professor; playwright

Lucette Desvignes (May 1, 1926 – February 14, 2024) was a French writer.

== Career ==
Desvignes taught comparative literature and theatre history at both the Université de Saint-Etienne and the Université de Lyon, before devoting her career to writing in the early 1980s. Her first book, Nœuds d'argile, was published in 1982. It was awarded the Prix Roland-Dorgelès that year. Nœuds d'argile was the first book in the Les Mains nues trilogy. The next two books, Le grain du chanvre and Le livre de Juste, were published in 1985 and 1986, the year in which she received the Prix Bourgogne for the trilogy.

In 1973, Desvignes spent six months as a visiting professor in Western Canada. She was made a Commander of the Ordre des Palmes Académiques in 1978. As of 2010, Desvignes had written ten novels, eight plays, three volumes of poetry, and more than 100 short stories.

== Personal life ==
Desvignes was born in Mercurey (Saône-et-Loire), France on May 1, 1926. She lived in Dijon from the late 1960s onwards. Her son, Antoine Volodine (born Jean Desvignes) is also a writer. She died on February 14, 2024, at the age of 97.

== Legacy ==
The French literary prize, Prix Lucette Desvignes de la Nouvelle, was created and named in honour of Desvignes.

== Works ==
Novels

- Les Mains nues trilogy
  - Noeuds d'argile (1982)
  - Le Grain du chanvre ou L'histoire de Jeanne (1985)
  - Le Livre de Juste (1986)
- Clair de nuit (1984)
- Les Mains libres
  - Vent debout (1991)
  - La Brise en poupe (1993)
- La Maison sans volets (1992)
- Le Miel de l'aube: une enfance en Bourgogne sous l'Occupation. (Autobiography, 2000)
- La Seconde Visite (2003)
- Voyage en Botulie (2008)
- Histoire de Colombe (2010)
