= SignalFx =

Cloud infrastructure monitoring platform acquired by Splunk for $1.05 billion in 2019

- Type: Subsidiary
- Founded: 2013; 13 years ago
- Founders: Karthik Rau; Phillip Liu
- Headquarters: San Mateo, CA
- Number of employees: 200+
- Parent: Splunk
- Website: signalfx.com

SignalFx was a cloud-based monitoring and analytics platform now owned by Splunk Inc., who acquired the company in 2019 and integrated its technology into the Splunk Observability Cloud.

Originally founded as an independent SaaS company headquartered in San Mateo, California, SignalFx provided tools for analyzing, visualizing, automating, and alerting on metrics data from infrastructure, applications, microservices, containers, and functions. The system used a streaming architecture that separated metric data into two streams—one for metadata and another for time-series values processed through a publish-subscribe bus and an analytics language called SignalFlow.

== History ==
SignalFx was co-founded by Karthik Rau and Phillip Liu in February 2013. SignalFx received $8.5 million in Series A funding from Andreessen Horowitz, with Ben Horowitz joining its board. In 2015, SignalFx received $20 million in Series B funding led by Charles River Ventures, with participation from Andreessen Horowitz; Devdutt Yellurkar joined the board. In May 2018, SignalFx announced its Series D funding of $45 million led by General Catalyst, with participation from existing investors Andreessen Horowitz and Charles River Ventures. In June 2019, the company raised $75 million in its Series E round led by Tiger Global Management, bringing the company's total funding to $179 million.

SignalFx served customers including Athenahealth, Chairish, Ellie Mae, Carbon black, Kayak, Shutterfly, Sunrun, and Yelp.

=== Splunk acquisition ===
SignalFx was acquired by Splunk on August 21, 2019, for $1.05 billion. The acquisition aimed to enhance Splunk's cloud-native observability and APM capabilities, integrating SignalFx into Splunk’s Observability Suite. The acquisition consisted of 60% cash ($630 million) and 40% Splunk common stock (SPLK). The transaction closed on October 2, 2019. SignalFx became part of the Splunk Cloud Platform and, following Cisco’s acquisition of Splunk in March 2024, came under Cisco’s ownership.
