= Michael Baum (entrepreneur) =

American entrepreneur and investor

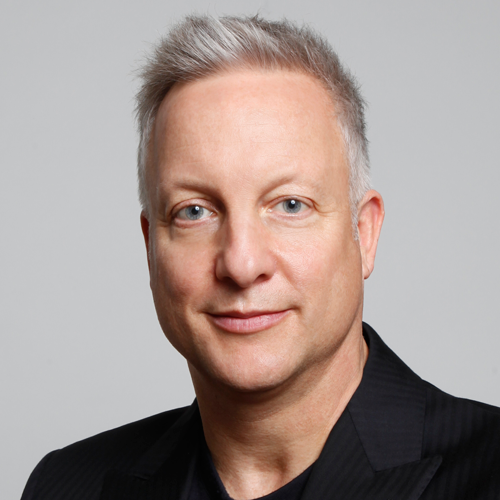
- Born: Michael Joseph Baum; May 28, 1962 (age 64); Philadelphia, Pennsylvania, USA
- Education: Wharton School at the University of Pennsylvania (M.B.A.); Drexel University (BSc.)
- Occupations: Businessman, investor, software engineer
- Known for: Founder & CEO of Founder.org; Board member of Gemini Data; Co-founder & CEO of Splunk; Founder of Big Data Supper Club; Co-founder of Collation; VP e-Commerce at Yahoo! Co-founder & COO of DotBank; VP e-Commerce at Disney; Co-founder & CEO of 280; Co-founder & CEO of Pensoft; Co-founder & CTO at Reality; CEO & Propriétaire at Chateau de Pommard
- Parent(s): Mardell A. Baum; Richard L. Baum, Sr.
- Website: founder.org

Michael Baum (born May 28, 1962) is an American businessman and investor. He is best known as the founder & CEO of Splunk, a big data software technology used for understanding machine-generated data primarily for systems management, security forensics, compliance reporting and real-time operational intelligence. Baum is the founder of six technology start-ups, five of which have been acquired and one (NASDAQ: SPLK) which went public. He has also been a venture capital investor with Rembrandt Venture Partners, Advent International and Crosspoint Venture Partners. Baum graduated with a computer science degree from Drexel University and an MBA from The Wharton School at the University of Pennsylvania. In September 2014, Baum became CEO & Propriétaire of Château de Pommard, a Burgundy winery established in 1726.

== Early life and education ==
Baum was born in Philadelphia, Pennsylvania, and attended high school at Cherry Hill High School East. During his sophomore year at Drexel University, he switched his major from electrical engineering to computer science after a visit to the campus by famed American business and technology icon Steve Jobs; the focus of his bachelor's degree was artificial intelligence and compiler and language theory. He went on to earn a Masters of Business Administration with a focus on corporate finance from The Wharton School at the University of Pennsylvania.

== Business career ==
During his time at college, Baum expressed curiosity in understanding how computers and software could be applied to enable people to process large amounts of data in complex decision-making.

Baum pursued a career in technology and entrepreneurship. He co-founded Reality Online, a stock market modeling company. Reality Online was funded by Venrock, the venture capital arm of the Rockefeller family, and later acquired by Reuters in 1989.

In September 2014, Baum bought Château de Pommard, a Burgundy winery established in 1726, and moved to Burgundy with his family.

=== Splunk ===
Continuing to explore the possibilities of advancing an understanding of chaotic systems, Baum began to explore the application of search technology to large-scale machine data. Reconnecting with Rob Das and Erik Swan in 2003, the three co-founded Splunk. Their goal was to build a search engine for real-time flows and massive historical corpuses of machine data. Splunk was the sixth startup for Baum and the first pure-play big data company to reach significant customer and revenue scale and debut on the public markets. Baum, Das and Swan and their team at Splunk have been awarded two US Patents for their work.

Baum was Splunk's founding CEO for the first six years. He raised $40M in venture capital financing from August Capital, Seven Rosen Funds, JK&B Capital and Ignition Partners.

Splunk was acquired by Cisco for $28 billion in an all-cash deal announced in September 2023.
