= Saint-Martin-sous-Montaigu =

- Commune
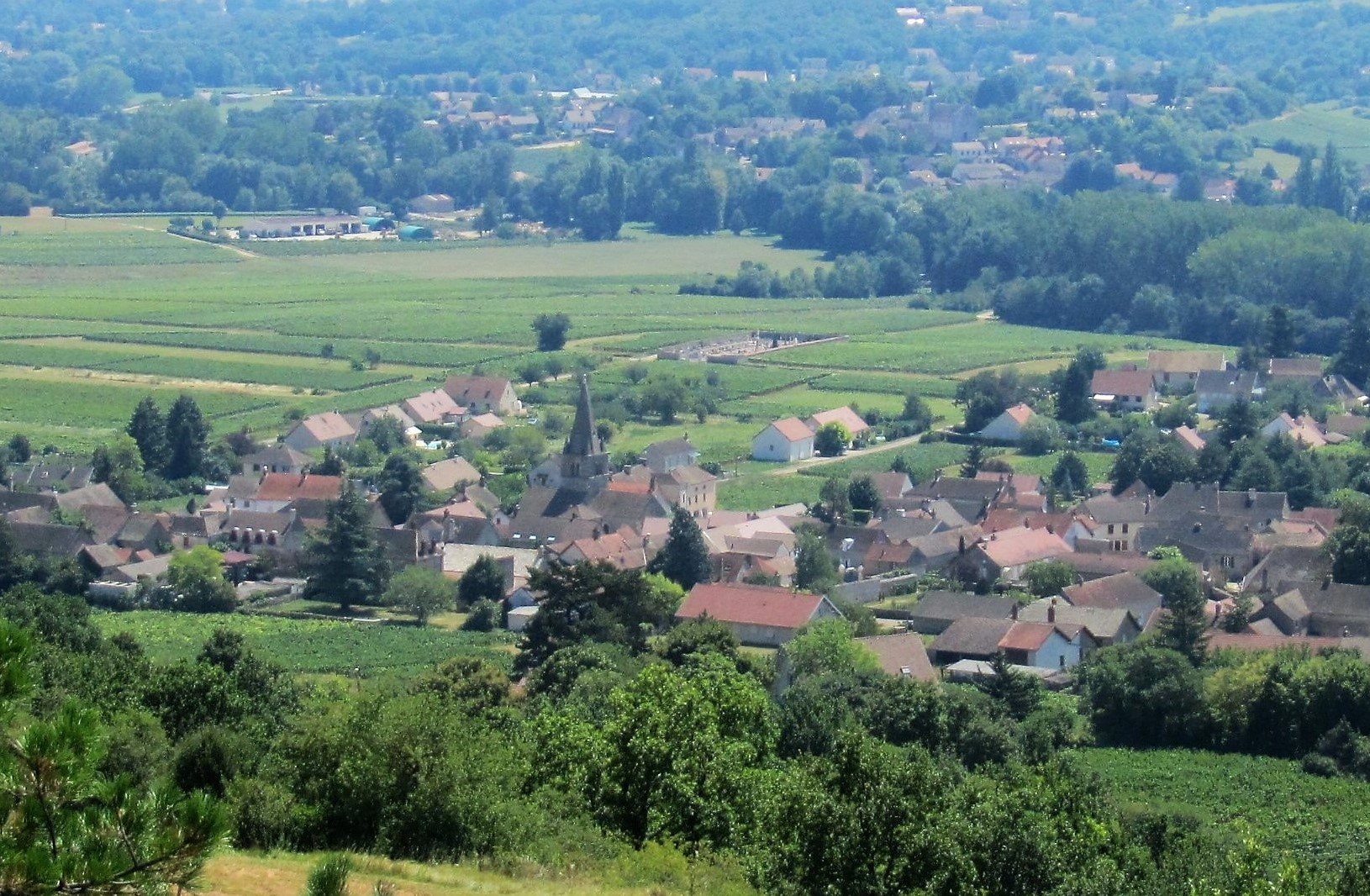
- A general view of Saint-Martin-sous-Montaigu

- Coat of arms
- Location of Saint-Martin-sous-Montaigu
- Location within France Location within Bourgogne-Franche-Comté
- Coordinates: 46°49′02″N 4°42′52″E
- Country: France
- Region: Bourgogne-Franche-Comté
- Department: Saône-et-Loire
- Arrondissement: Chalon-sur-Saône
- Canton: Givry
- Intercommunality: CA Le Grand Chalon

Government
  - Mayor (2020–2026): Christophe Hannecart
- Area^{1}: 3.65 km^{2} (1.41 sq mi)
- Elevation: 230 m (750 ft)
- Highest elevation: 397 m (1,302 ft)
- Lowest elevation: 214 m (702 ft)
- Population (2023): 319
  - Density: 87.4/km^{2} (226/sq mi)
- Time zone: UTC+01:00 (CET)
  - Summer (DST): UTC+02:00 (CEST)
- INSEE/Postal code: 71459 /71640
- ^{1} French Land Register data, which excludes lakes, ponds, glaciers > 1 km^{2} (0.386 sq mi or 247 acres) and river estuaries.

Saint-Martin-sous-Montaigu (French pronunciation: [sɛ̃ maʁtɛ̃ su mɔ̃tɛɡy]) is a commune in the Saône-et-Loire department in the region of Bourgogne-Franche-Comté in eastern France.

== Wine ==
The vineyards of Saint-Martin-sous-Montaigu are part of the appellation d'origine contrôlée Mercurey.

== See also ==
- Communes of the Saône-et-Loire department
