= Domaine Faiveley =

Wine producer in Burgundy, France

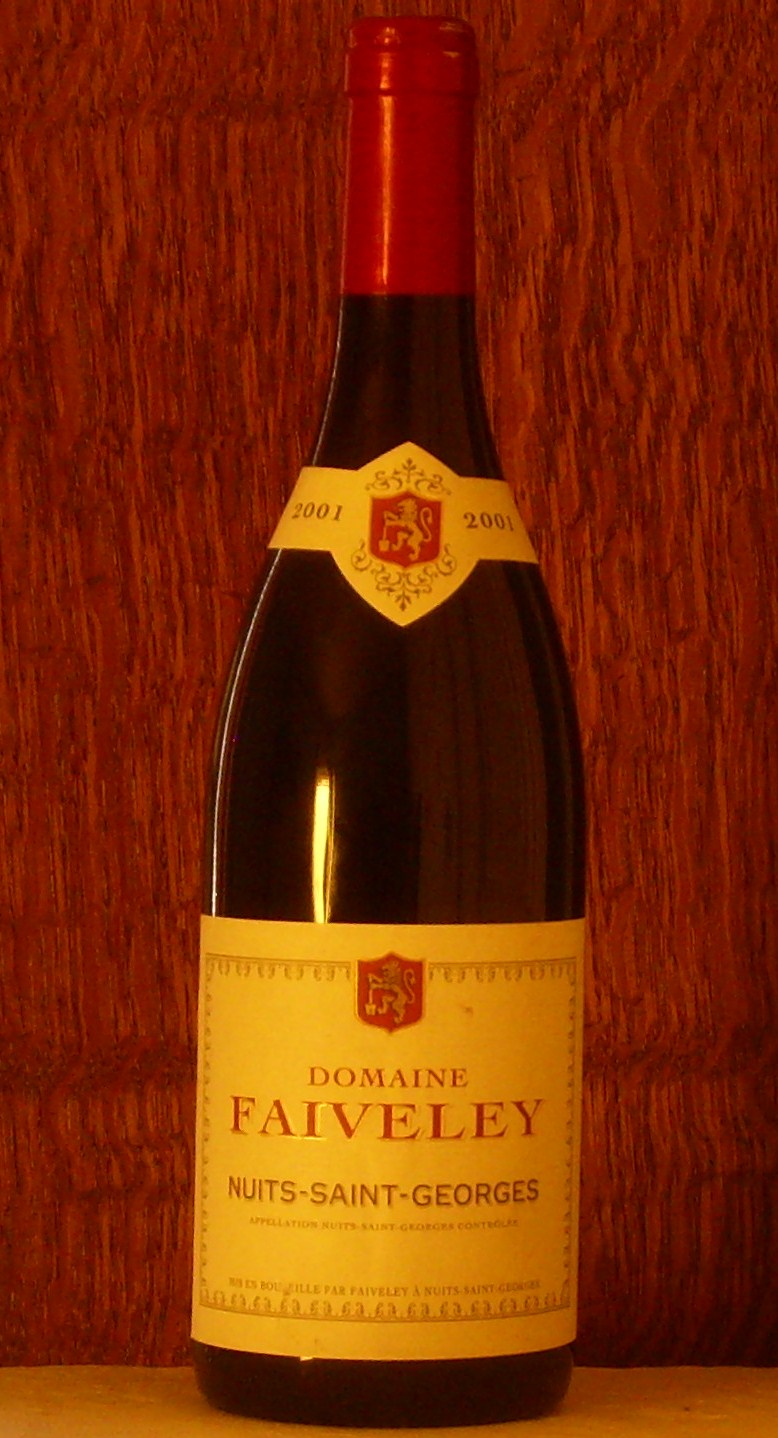
A bottle of Nuits-Saint-Georges wine from Domaine Faiveley

Domaine Faiveley is a wine producer in Burgundy, France situated in Nuits-Saint-Georges and established in 1825. Faiveley also runs a négociant business, but this activity is much smaller in volume than the wine production from their own vineyards.

== History ==
Domaine Faiveley was founded in 1825 by Pierre Faiveley, a native of Nuits-St.-Georges. The Domaine passed to his nephew, Joseph in 1860, who bought Corton Clos des Corton, a grand cru "monopole" (single-owner) vineyard. His son, Francois succeeded him in 1889. During his management (1889-1919), the Domaine purchased parcels in Nuits-St-Georges-les-St-Georges, a premier cru, and grand cru parcels in the Clos Vougeot vineyards. Three generations followed. Francois Faiveley’s great grandson, also named Francois, ran the company 1976 to 2004, extending the family holdings in the Cote de Nuits, Montagny, and Mercurey. Today, Domaine Faiveley is managed by Erwan Faiveley, who took over in 2005 as president, and his sister Eve, who joined in 2014.

In addition to revising the winemaking, Erwan Faiveley has continued the Domaine’s policy of purchasing premier cru and grand cru Burgundy vineyard parcels (including Charmes-Chambertin and le Musigny), as well as properties beyond the Cote d’Or, including vineyards in Chablis and California. In 2021 the company announced the purchase of a minority stake in Williams Selyem, a Sonoma County property specializing in Pinot Noir, from its owner, John Dyson. Under the agreement, the winery will be run by both Dyson and the Faiveleys for a three-year period, after which the partners will discuss an outright sale to the Faiveleys.

== Vineyards ==
Faiveley owns 125 hectares (310 acres) of vineyards in Burgundy, which makes them one of Burgundy's largest vineyard owners.

In the Cote d'Or, Faiveley holdings include the following Grand Cru vineyards:

- In Côte de Nuits: Chambertin-Clos de Bèze, Mazis-Chambertin, Latricières-Chambertin, Musigny, Clos de Vougeot and Echezeaux.
- In Côte de Beaune: Corton, Corton-Charlemagne, Corton Clos des Cortons Faiveley, Bâtard-Montrachet and Bienvenues-Bâtard-Montrachet.

They also have holdings in many Premier Cru vineyards in Côte de Nuits, Côte de Beaune and Côte Chalonnaise. The domaine's monopoles are:

- In Côte de Nuits: Gevrey-Chambertin Premier Cru Clos des Issarts
- In Côte de Beaune: Beaune Premier Cru Clos de l'Ecu
- In Côte Chalonnaise: Mercurey Premier Cru Clos des Myglands (red), Mercurey Les Mauvarennes (red and white), La Framboisière (red), Clos Rond (red) and Clos Rochette (white).

In Chablis, Faiveley holdings include grand cru, premier crus, and petit chablis vineyards.

In Sonoma County, California, they have a minority ownership of Williams Selyem.
