= Bugsense =

Greek software company

- Company type: Private Company
- Industry: Mobile application development
- Founded: 2011; 15 years ago
- Founder: Jon Vlachogiannis, Panayiotis Papadopoulos
- Headquarters: Athens, Greece
- Website: www.bugsense.com

Bugsense is a crash reporter for mobile phones. It collects and analyzes crash reports, performance and quality of applications on mobiles, which forwards them to the creators of those applications to act on them. Supported platforms include Android, iOS, Windows Phone 7, Windows Phone, Windows 8 and HTML 5.

== History ==
The company was founded in 2011 by Jon Vlachogiannis and Panayiotis Papadopoulos. Initial funds were acquired by Silicon Valley Greek Seed Funding Group. Bugsense expanded to supporting more than 30000 developers and companies, including Samsung, SoundCloud, and Trulia and has a market share of 3.43% of all apps. In September 2013, Bugsense was acquired by Splunk.
