= Rose Ann Finkel =

American businesswoman (1946–2020)

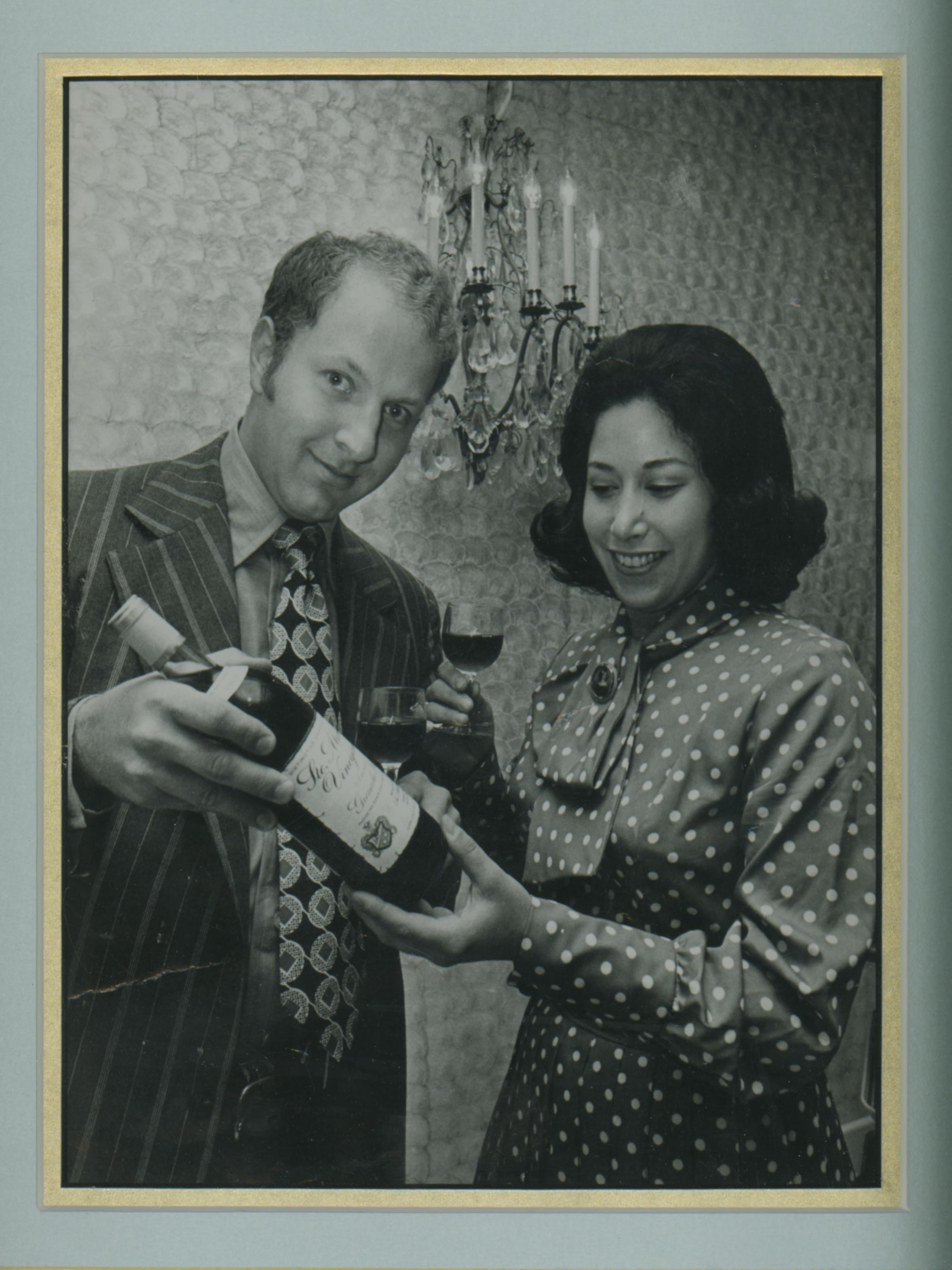
Charles and Rose Ann Finkel view a bottle of wine, circa 1972.

Rose Ann Finkel (1946–2020) was an American businesswoman who ran craft breweries and wine importing companies in Seattle. She co-founded Merchant du Vin and Pike Brewing with her husband Charles Finkel. She also co-owned the gourmet market Truffles.

== Early life ==
She was born in 1946 in New Orleans, Louisiana, and raised in Houston, Texas. She graduated from high school in 1964 and pursued dental hygiene as a career because it paid better than other options for women.

== Marriage ==
Rose Ann was introduced to Charles Finkel in 1968 by a mutual friend. Charles was working at a wine import company based in New York, and they met at a wine tasting he was conducting at a new wine bar in Houston, Texas. They dated for a month before becoming engaged, married six months later at the Shamrock Hilton Hotel, and honeymooned in Mexico City. At the time of their marriage, she made $100 more a month than he did and managed the finances but couldn't be the sole signer for a credit card. They had two children.

== Community involvement ==
She was on the board of the Weizmann Institute of Science and judged the Slow Food Awards at the biannual Salone del Gusto in Turin, Italy. She was one of the founders of the Slow Food movement in Seattle, an organization dedicated to using and sharing locally sourced ingredients with the community. She was a member of Les Dames d'Escoffier, which is an international organization of women in the hospitality industry, and contributed the section on beer for the book Cooking with Les Dames d'Escoffier: At Home with the Women Who Shape the Way We Eat and Drink.

A noted philanthropist, she worked on community events, including Pike's Women in Beer, which was an annual event "recognizes women-owned and women-led breweries, distilleries, wineries and cideries, as well as restaurants, chocolatiers and cheesemakers." Proceeds go to Planned Parenthood of the Great Northwest and Hawaiian Islands. After her death, contributions were made in her name to charities such as The Weizmann Institute of Science, Fred Hutchinson Cancer Research, Planned Parenthood, The Southern Poverty Law Center, and College Success Foundation.

== Professional life ==
Rose Ann and Charles were partners in several businesses; they said she had the business sense and he was the designer. She enjoyed travel and educating herself and others about wine, beer, and food.

They co-founded their first business, Bon-Vin, in 1969, which specialized in imported, boutique wine. They imported small labels from Europe and marketed little-known West Coast vintners. Her work as a dental hygienist supported the company. The business grew quickly, and they traveled to Europe to visit wineries.

In 1974, the owners of Chateau Ste. Michelle's bought Bon-Vin. Charles became the sales and marketing director for the winery, located in Woodinville, Washington, and the couple moved to Seattle.

In 1977, Rose Ann and two friends opened Truffles, a small specialty grocery store in the Laurelhurst neighborhood of Seattle that sold imported and domestic beer, corned beef from Katz Deli in New York, and cheesecakes. They claimed it was the first store in the U.S. to import fresh Perigord truffles. Truffles was named one of the top 5 specialty stores in the U.S. by Time magazine.

In 1978, the Finkels started Merchant du Vin, today known as one of the world's largest craft beer importers but originally focused on importing wine. "They are credited with bringing craft beers from England, Germany and Belgium to American drinkers." They focused on importing beers made by family-run breweries in England, Germany, and Belgium and worked with U.S. brewers to revive classic brewing styles. Contracts included Yuengling, Traquair House, Trappist Ale from Belgium, and the English brewery Samuel Smith. Rose Ann was the Chief Operating Officer, vice president of marketing, and educated restaurant owners about beer and food pairings. She also named Germany's famous Ayinger Celebrator double bock beer.

The Finkels opened Pike Place Brewery in 1989 at 1421 Western Avenue. When it opened it was the third in Seattle and one of only a few independent, microbreweries state. In 1996, the business moved to its present location on First Avenue and the name was shortened to Pike Brewing; they also added the restaurant. Rose Ann had many responsibilities in the company: business operations, negotiating deals, leadership, and supply management. In 1997, they sold the brewery and became heavily involved with the local and international slow food movement. In 2006, bought Pike Brewing back and Rose Ann became the vice-president.

They purchased Liberty Malt Supply, a retail supplier for home winemakers and homebrewers, from John Fariasin 1989.

== Legacy ==
Rose Ann's approach to business and life was influential on people in the industry, especially women who looked to her as a role model. In 2020, the Puget Sound Business Journal posthumously honored her with the "Women of Influence in Memoriam" award for her widespread and long-lived influence on the brewery and restaurant scene in Seattle and beyond." In 2015, the Finkels' contributions to the food and beverage industry were recognized with the Angelo Pellegrini Award.

== Death ==
She died June 16, 2020, from myelodysplastic syndrome blood cancer at the age of 73.
