= Domaine Harmand Geoffroy =

Harmand Geoffroy is a grower producing Gevrey-Chambertin wine in the Côte-d'Or region of France.

The red wine—a Burgundy—is made mostly from Pinot Noir grapes although small amounts of other grapes are allowed.

Their "Clos Prieur" is one of Chambertin's Premier Crus; they also produce a "Vielles Vignes"; an "En Jouise" and an untitled Gevrey-Chambertin wine.
