= Château de Pommard =

Winery in Pommard, Burgundy, France

Coordinates: 47.008°N 4.798°E

Château de Pommard is a winery in Pommard, Burgundy, France. Established in 1726, the property is known for its two Châteaux, gardens, and its 20 hectare walled vineyard, Clos Marey-Monge. The Châteaux, the vineyard and the winemaking facilities are operated and owned by Michael Baum, who purchased the estate in 2014. The winery produces "Clos" wines – Pinot Noir produced from the fruit of Clos Marey-Monge and "Family" wines – Grand Cru, Premier Cru, Village and Bourgogne wines from Chardonnay and Pinot Noir appellations across the Côte de Nuits and the Côte de Beaune. In 2016, the estate tested biodynamic methods on 2.5 hectares of vines, and stated the intention of being entirely biodynamic for the 2019 vintage.

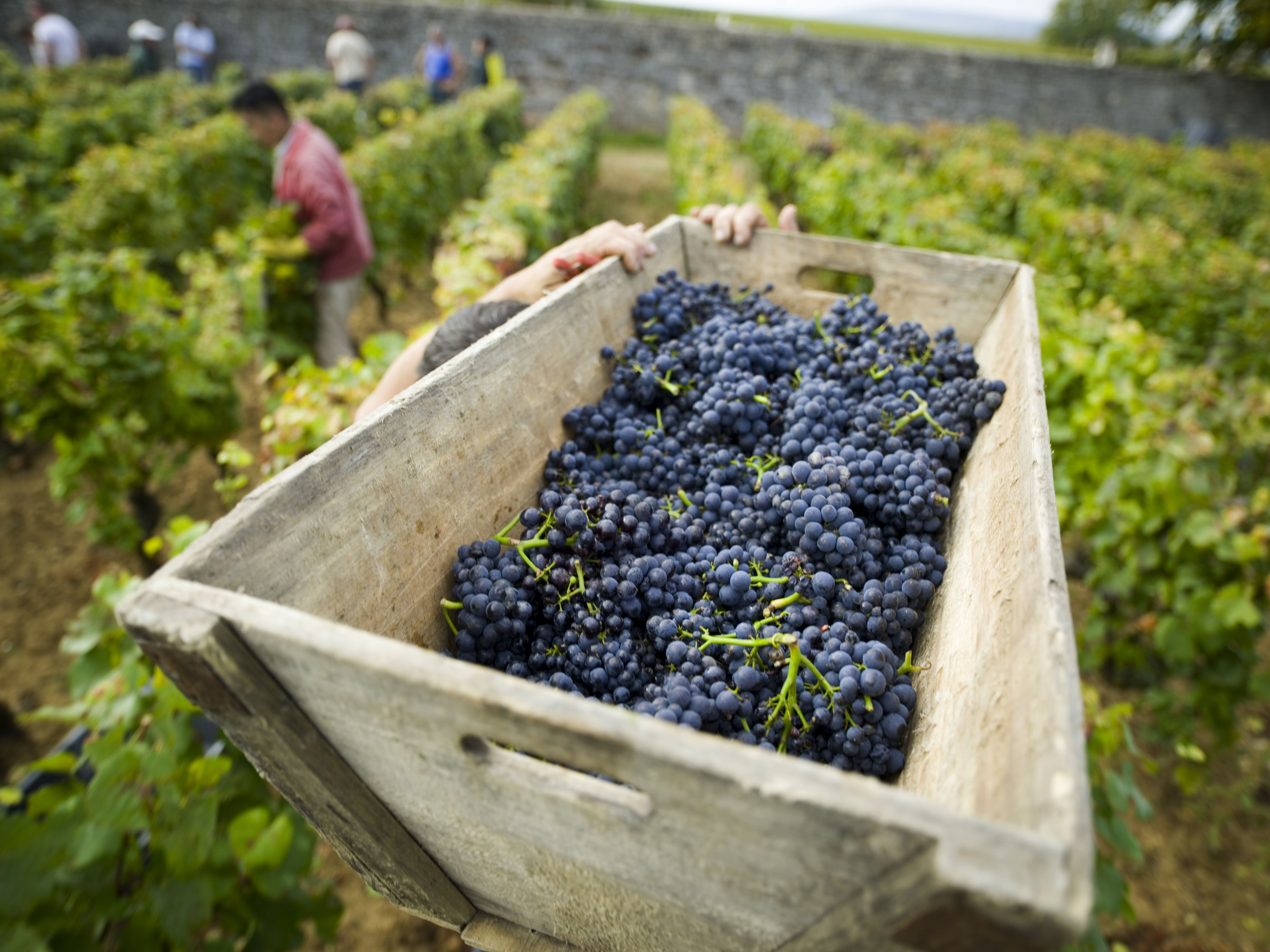
Château de Pommard Harvest

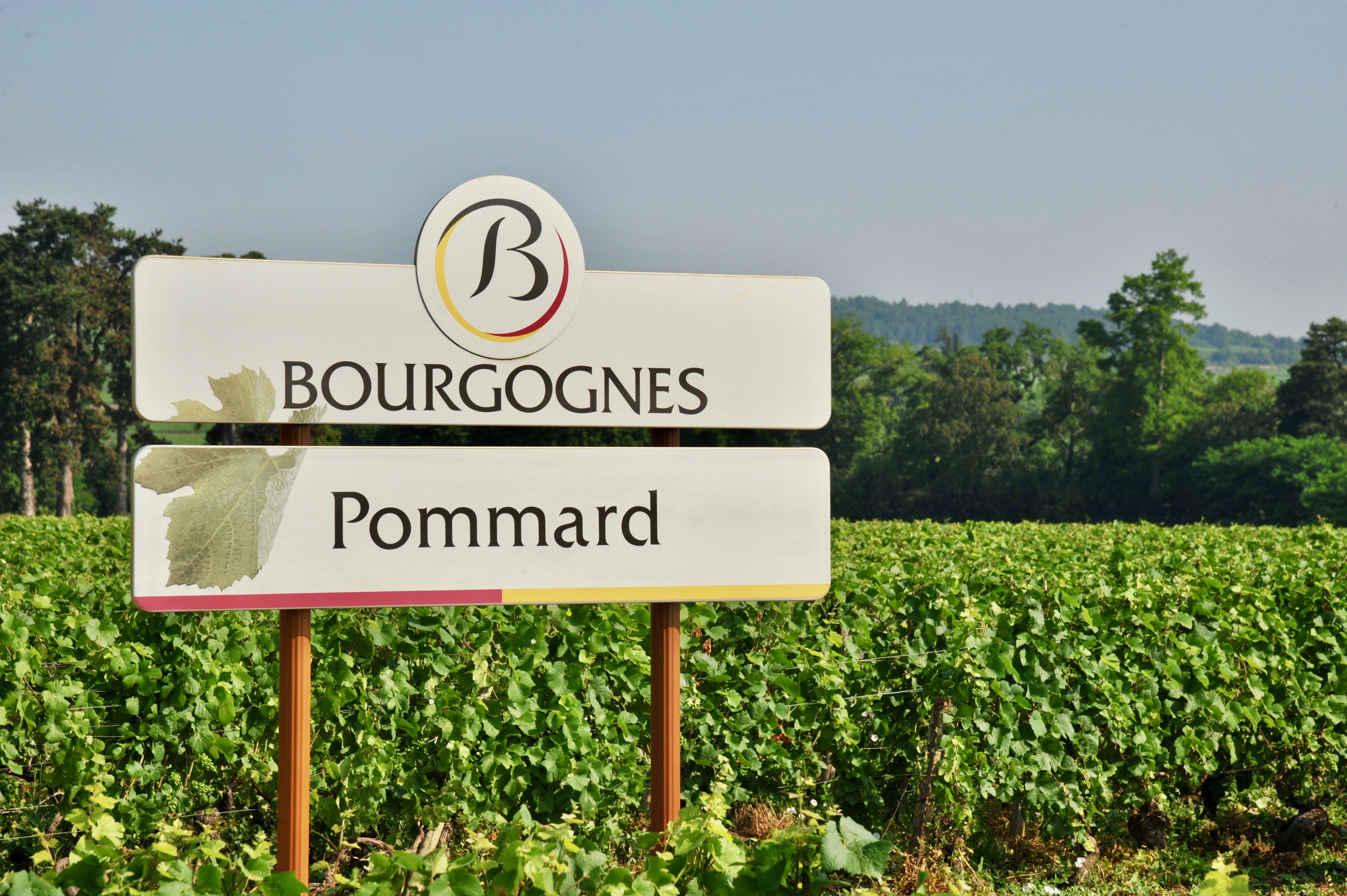
Pommard, Bourgogne, BIVB, Route des Grands Crus Sign

== History ==
In 1726, Vivant Micault, secretary to King Louis XV and descendant of Pommard's Captain Philibert Micault began constructing Château Micault, as it is known now, near the ruins of the 11th-century fortress of Odo I, Duke of Burgundy. Château Micault, built from Chassagne-Montrachet pink limestone, was designed by Parisian architect, Charles-Étienne Brisseaux, in the Regency style of the era.

After thirty years of ownership and expansion, in 1756, Vivant Micault bequeathed the Château and the vineyards to his two sons, Joseph and Jean Micault. The brothers' auctioned the estate between themselves, leaving Joseph to become the sole owner, buying out Jean for the sum of 90,000 francs. In 1794, Jean Micault was later guillotined in the centre of Dijon, for the then-crime of emigration. In 1763, the "Royal Estate of Pommard" was purchased by a local wine merchant, Claude Marey.

In 1770, following the death of Claude Marey, his son, Nicolas-Joseph Marey, inherited the Pommard estate and ran the operation with his wife, Émilie Monge – daughter of French mathematician Gaspard Monge – the future namesake of the vineyard.

Then in 1789, on the eve of the French Revolution, Nicolas-Joseph sold Château Micault, a symbol of French aristocracy, for 25,000 francs to Paul Henri François. Unable to buy back the Château after the decade-long revolution, Nicolas-Joseph built a second manor – Château Marey-Monge, in 1802, which became their family home.

With Nicolas-Joseph's sudden death in 1818, at the age of 58, Émilie Marey-Monge became the first female head of the winemaking estate. Staying within the family throughout the tenure of the couple's eight children, including war hero Guillaume-Stanislas Marey-Monge and politician Alphonse Marey-Monge, it wasn't until the youngest granddaughter, Edith Marey-Monge, married Hérve de Blic that the Château found itself under the ownership of a new family name. The vineyards and the two Châteaux remained divided until 1936 when the Château was purchased by Louis Laplanche. It was later on that his son – and famous psychoanalyst – Jean Laplanche would reunite the estate.

In 2003, after almost 80 years of Laplanche family stewardship, Château de Pommard found itself under new proprietors – this time, the Giraud family, from Haute Savoie. Maurice Giraud transformed Château de Pommard into a 21st-century wine tourist destination, and employed the society of the craftsmen and artisans, the Compagnons du Tour de France, to renovate the entire premises, as well as introducing the now-trademarked "Grand Vin" hand-blown "dumpy" bottle, based on an original mid-18th-century Pommard wine bottle, and, in 2010, the cuvée Simone, produced from the Simone terroir, which contains one of the highest clay densities in Burgundy.

In 2014, Michael Baum, an American software entrepreneur, bought the entirety of the estate and became the first American to own a wine-producing château in Burgundy.

== Clos Marey-Monge ==
Each of Clos Marey-Monge's seven plots – Simone, Chantrerie, Les Paules, Grand Champ, 75 Rangs, Micault and Émilie – has its own soil type and microclimate. Simone and Chantrerie contain two of the highest clay density levels recorded in Burgundy, a measurement of more than 735m2/g, as discovered by Claude Bourguignon and Lydia Bourguignon of LAMS in 2009. The south-east facing vines of the vineyard spans 20 hectares in surface area and is enclosed within a two-meter-tall and 2,000-meter-long stone fortress wall, erected in 1812 by Nicolas-Joseph Marey-Monge. With 150 million years of geology forming the fundamental building blocks of its soils.

Clos Marey-Monge today sits on an alluvial fan known as the Avant-Dheune Valley dejection cone, a geological structure that presents helpful conditions for the notoriously demanding Pinot Noir varietal to flourish. Clos Marey-Monge was awarded première cuvée status in Professor Jules Lavalle's The History and Statistics of the Great Wines of the Côte d'Or, a comprehensive classification of the region's soils, first published in 1855. Since 2016, and in collaboration with Biodynamic Specialist, Antoine Lepetit de la Bigne, Clos Marey-Monge is both biodynamically and sustainably farmed.

== UNESCO World Heritage Site ==
In July 2015, UNESCO declared Clos Marey-Monge a world heritage protected Climat of Burgundy. The Carabello-Baum family were one of the Grand Mécène of the UNESCO Burgundy Climats project, an accolade which honoured Burgundy's 1,247 climats for their Exceptional Universal Value. Aubert de Villaine, president of the Association des Climats du Vignoble de Bourgogne, said of the achievement: "This status is the recognition of the work of generations of men and women, vignerons, Cistercian monks and Dukes of Burgundy, who have all created Burgundy's vineyards over the centuries in a determined quest for excellence." The UNESCO count of 1,247 seems to be an under-counting, due to database errors. A more accurate number is 1,628.
