= Volnay, Côte-d'Or =

Volnay
- Commune
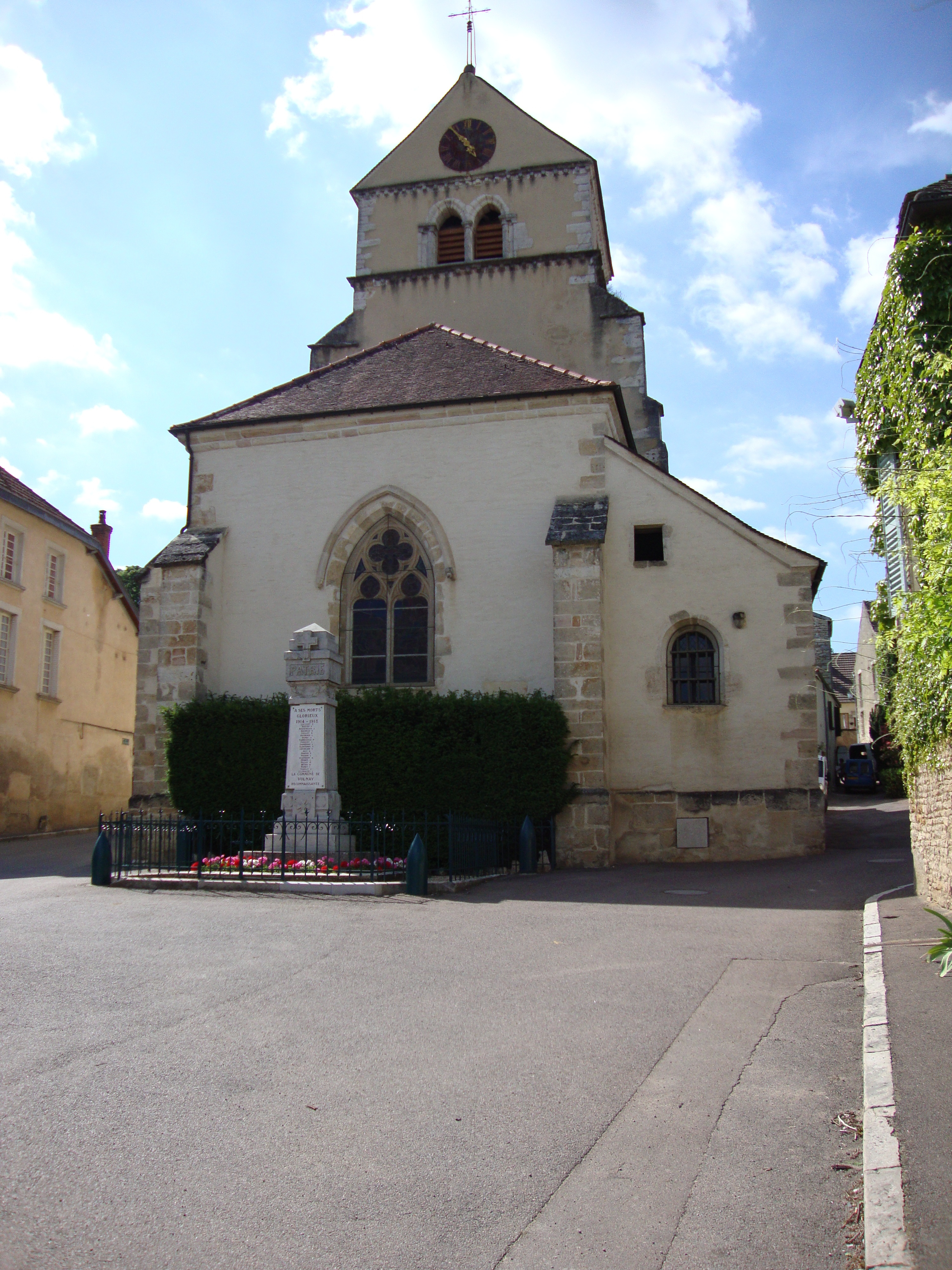
- The church in Volnay

- Coat of arms
- Location of Volnay
- Location within France Location within Bourgogne-Franche-Comté
- Coordinates: 47°00′08″N 4°46′56″E
- Country: France
- Region: Bourgogne-Franche-Comté
- Department: Côte-d'Or
- Arrondissement: Beaune
- Canton: Ladoix-Serrigny
- Intercommunality: CA Beaune Côte et Sud

Government
  - Mayor (2020–2026): Pascal Bouley
- Area^{1}: 7.55 km^{2} (2.92 sq mi)
- Elevation: 265 m (869 ft)
- Highest elevation: 393 m (1,289 ft)
- Lowest elevation: 209 m (686 ft)
- Population (2023): 224
  - Density: 29.7/km^{2} (76.8/sq mi)
- Time zone: UTC+01:00 (CET)
  - Summer (DST): UTC+02:00 (CEST)
- INSEE/Postal code: 21712 /21190
- ^{1} French Land Register data, which excludes lakes, ponds, glaciers > 1 km^{2} (0.386 sq mi or 247 acres) and river estuaries.

Volnay (French pronunciation: [vɔlnɛ]) is a commune in the Côte-d'Or department in eastern France.

In the middle of the Côte de Beaune, it is a well-known appellation of Burgundy wine.

== Population ==
Historical population
| Year | Pop. | ±% p.a. |
|---|---|---|
| 1968 | 464 | — |
| 1975 | 452 | −0.37% |
| 1982 | 411 | −1.35% |
| 1990 | 355 | −1.81% |
| 1999 | 323 | −1.04% |
| 2007 | 292 | −1.25% |
| 2012 | 277 | −1.05% |
| 2017 | 241 | −2.75% |
| 2023 | 224 | −1.21% |
Source: INSEE

== Wine ==
In general, the wines are lighter than most other red Burgundies from the Côte-d'Or. 80,000 cases of red wine come from its 242ha of vineyards, of which 115ha is split among 26 Premier Crus. The most notable of these are Bousse d'Or, Champans, Clos des Chenes, Clos des Ducs, Les Caillerets, Santenots and Taille Pied.

Red wine from the Santenots vineyard is classified as Volnay Santenots, whereas white wine from the same vineyard can call itself Meursault Premier Cru or Meursault Santenots.

== See also ==
- Communes of the Côte-d'Or department
- Burgundy wine
- Route des Grands Crus
- Côte de Beaune
- Ensemble Santenay - an ensemble specializing in the performance of Early Music.
