= Clos Marey-Monge =

Vineyard in Burgundy, France

Coordinates: 47.007°N 4.802°E

- Location: Pommard, France
- Known for: Pinot Noir
- Distribution: International
- Website: chateaudepommard.com

Clos Marey-Monge is a 20-hectare (49-acre) wine vineyard located at the Château de Pommard estate in the village of Pommard, France.The historic vineyard is surrounded by a wall, as evidenced by the word "Clos" (French for 'enclosure') in its name. The name also refers to the wines coming from the vineyard.

It is located on top of the Avant-Dheune Valley dejection cone, a geological structure.

Clos Marey-Monge has a terroir of a total size of 20 ha (0.2 km²), split into seven separately planted zones of varied soil types:

- Simone
- Chantrerie
- Les Paules
- Grand Champs
- 75 Rangs
- Micault
- Émilie

== UNESCO World Heritage ==
In July 2015, the area encompassing Clos Marey-Monge was designated as a protected component of the "Climats, terroirs of Burgundy" UNESCO World Heritage site.
