= Mercurey wine =

Wine from Côte Chalonnaise, Burgundy, France

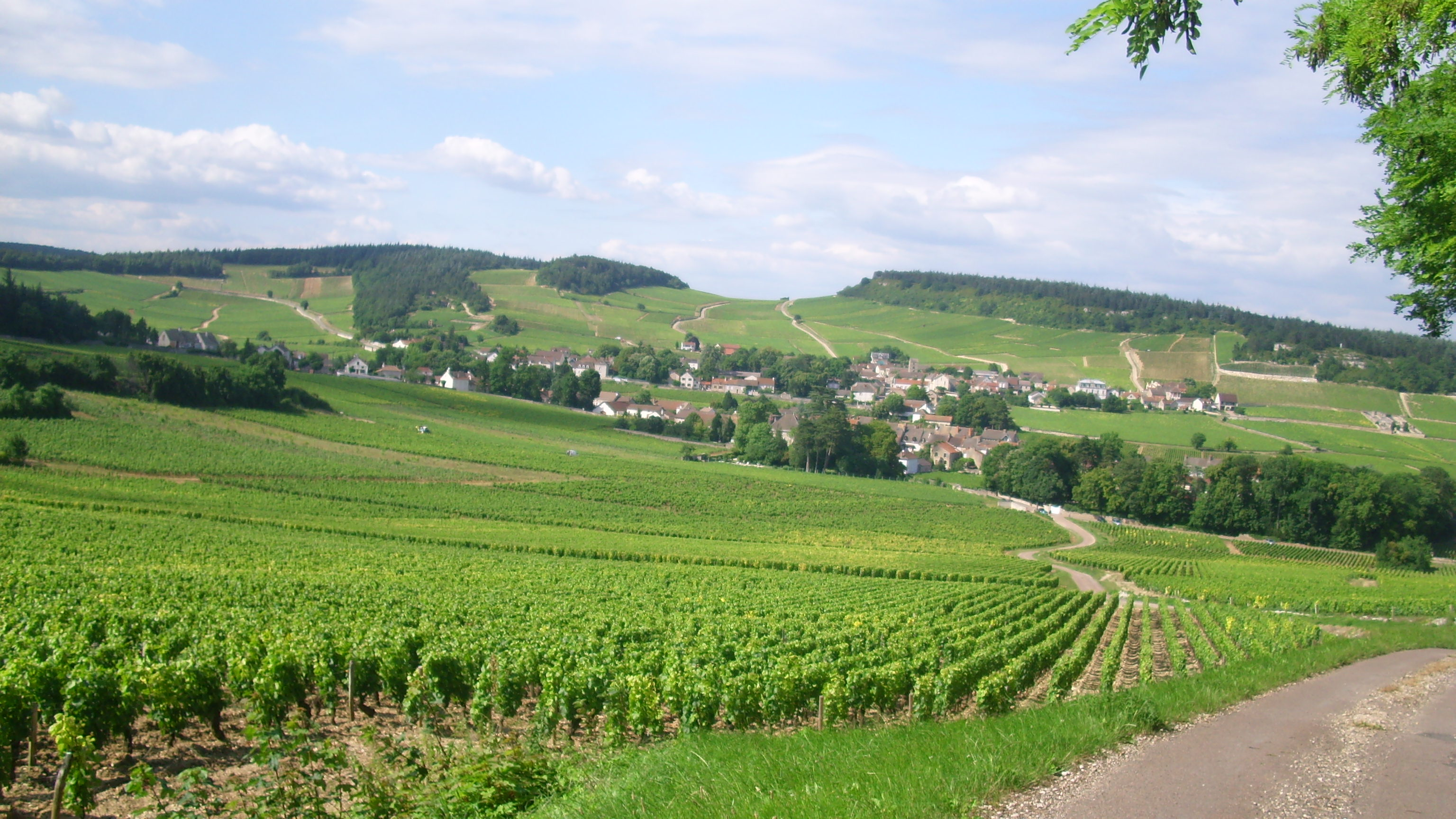
Vineyards around Mercurey

Mercurey wine is produced in the communes of Mercurey and Saint-Martin-sous-Montaigu in the Côte Chalonnaise subregion of Burgundy. The Appellation d'origine contrôlée (AOC) Mercurey may be used for red and white wine with respectively Pinot noir and Chardonnay as the main grape variety. The production of red wine dominates, with almost 80 per cent.

There are 32 Premier Cru vineyards within Mercurey AOC, but no Grand Cru vineyards exist in this part of Burgundy. The AOC was created in 1936.

== Wine style ==
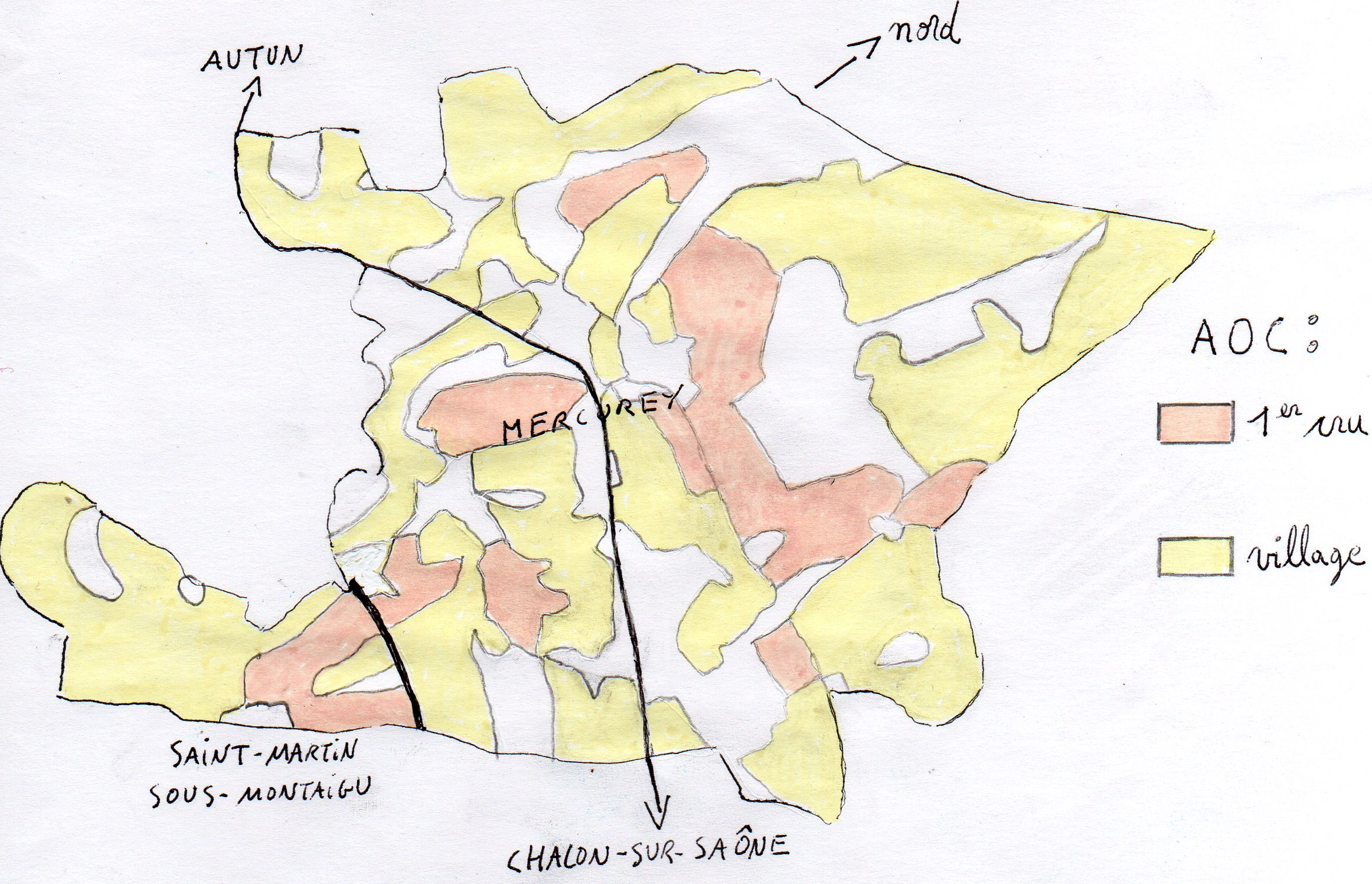
Map of the appellation

The red wines of this area are characterized by their deep colour, compared to neighbouring appellations, and fuller bodies. The wines of Mercurey are noted for their spicy cherry notes but quality can be quite varied. The late 20th century saw an influx in vineyard expansion with some new plantings going on sites less suitable for quality viticulture. This expansion has increased the propensity for lower quality Mercurey which can taste more dilute with weaker fruit flavours. The less common white wines made in the area are characterized by their minerality and apple notes. Well-made examples typically drink at their peak between 5–12 years after vintage.

== Production ==
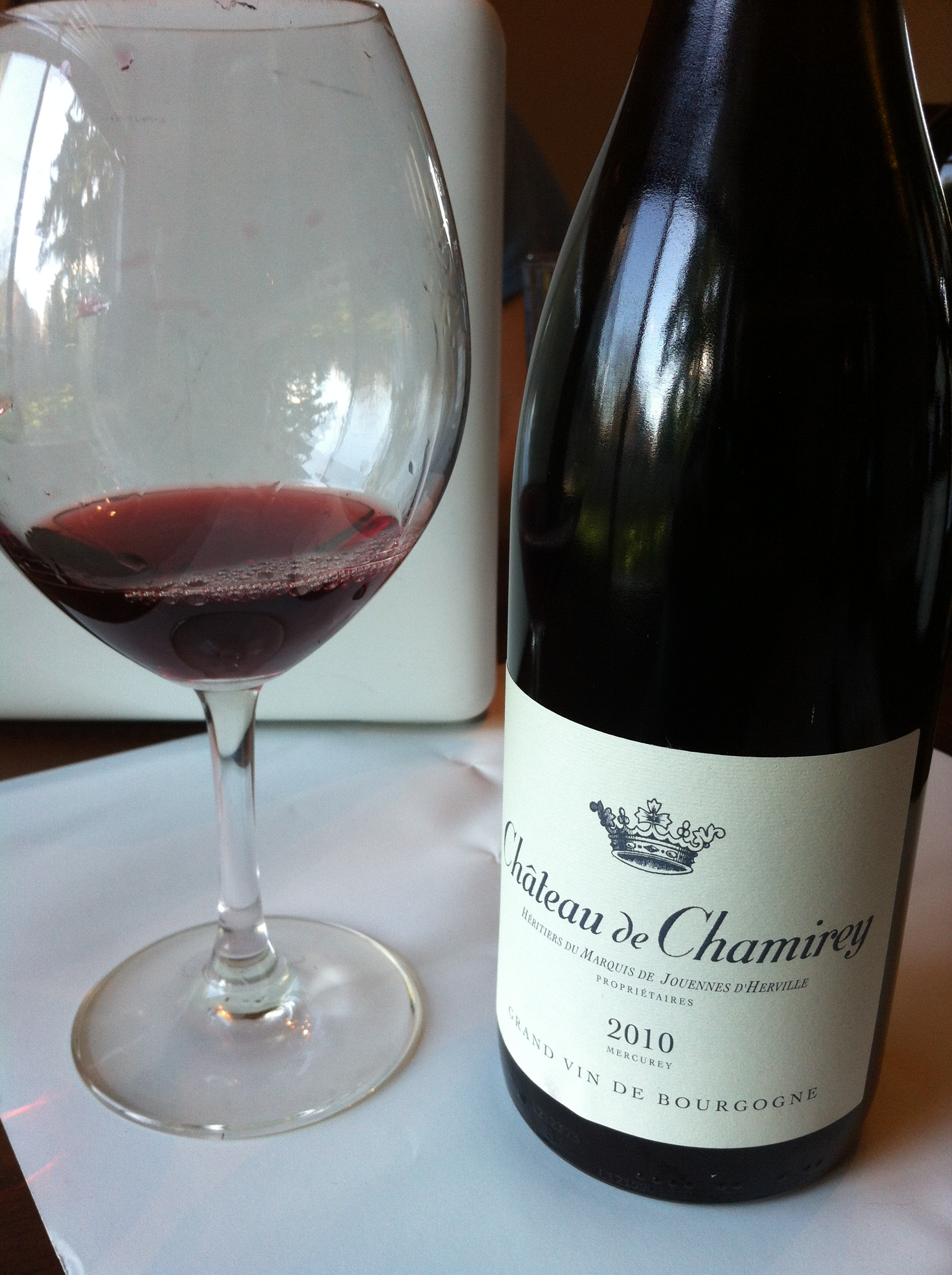
A glass of Mercurey Pinot noir.

In 2008, 646.09 hectares (1,596.5 acres) of vineyard surface was in production for Mercurey at village and Premier Cru level, and 27,668 hectoliters of wine were produced, of which 22,583 hectoliters were red wine and 5,105 hectoliters were white wine. Some 75.66 hectares (187.0 acres) of this area was used for the white wines in 2007. The total amount produced corresponds to just under 3.7 million bottles, of which just over 3.0 million bottles of red wine and just under 700,000 bottles of white wine.

Mercurey has the largest production of the Côte Chalonnaise appellations.

== AOC regulations ==
The AOC regulations allow up to 15 per cent total of Chardonnay, Pinot blanc and Pinot gris as accessory grapes in the red wines, but this is not very often practised. For white wines, both Chardonnay and Pinot blanc are allowed, but most wines are likely to be 100% Chardonnay. The allowed base yield is 40 hectolitre per hectare for red wine and 45 for white wine. The grapes must reach a maturity of at least 10.5 per cent potential alcohol for village-level red wine, 11.0 per cent for village-level white wine and Premier Cru red wine, and 11.5 per cent for Premier Cru white wine.

== Premiers Crus ==
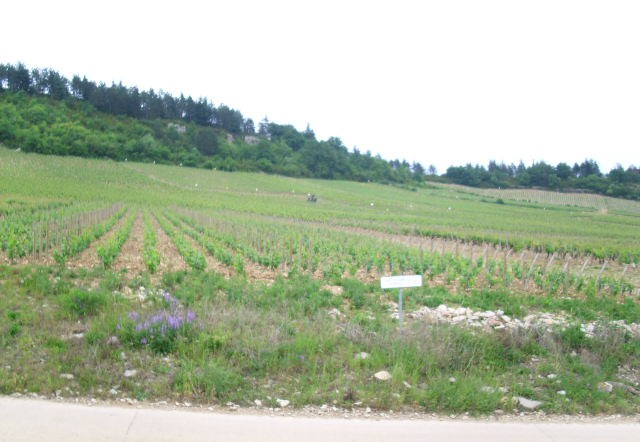
Les Champs Martin - a Mercurey Premier Cru vineyard

There are 32 climats within the Mercurey AOC classified as Premier Cru vineyards. Their wines are designated Mercurey Premier Cru + vineyard name, or as just Mercurey Premier Cru, in which case it is possible to blend wine from several Premier Cru vineyards within the AOC.

In 2007, 160.45 hectares (396.5 acres) of the total Mercurey vineyard surface consisted of Premier Cru vineyards, of which 146.78 hectares (362.7 acres) red and 13.67 hectares (33.8 acres) white Mercurey Premier Cru. The annual production of Premier Cru wine, as a five-year average, is 6,079 hectoliter of red wine and 656 hectoliter of white wine.

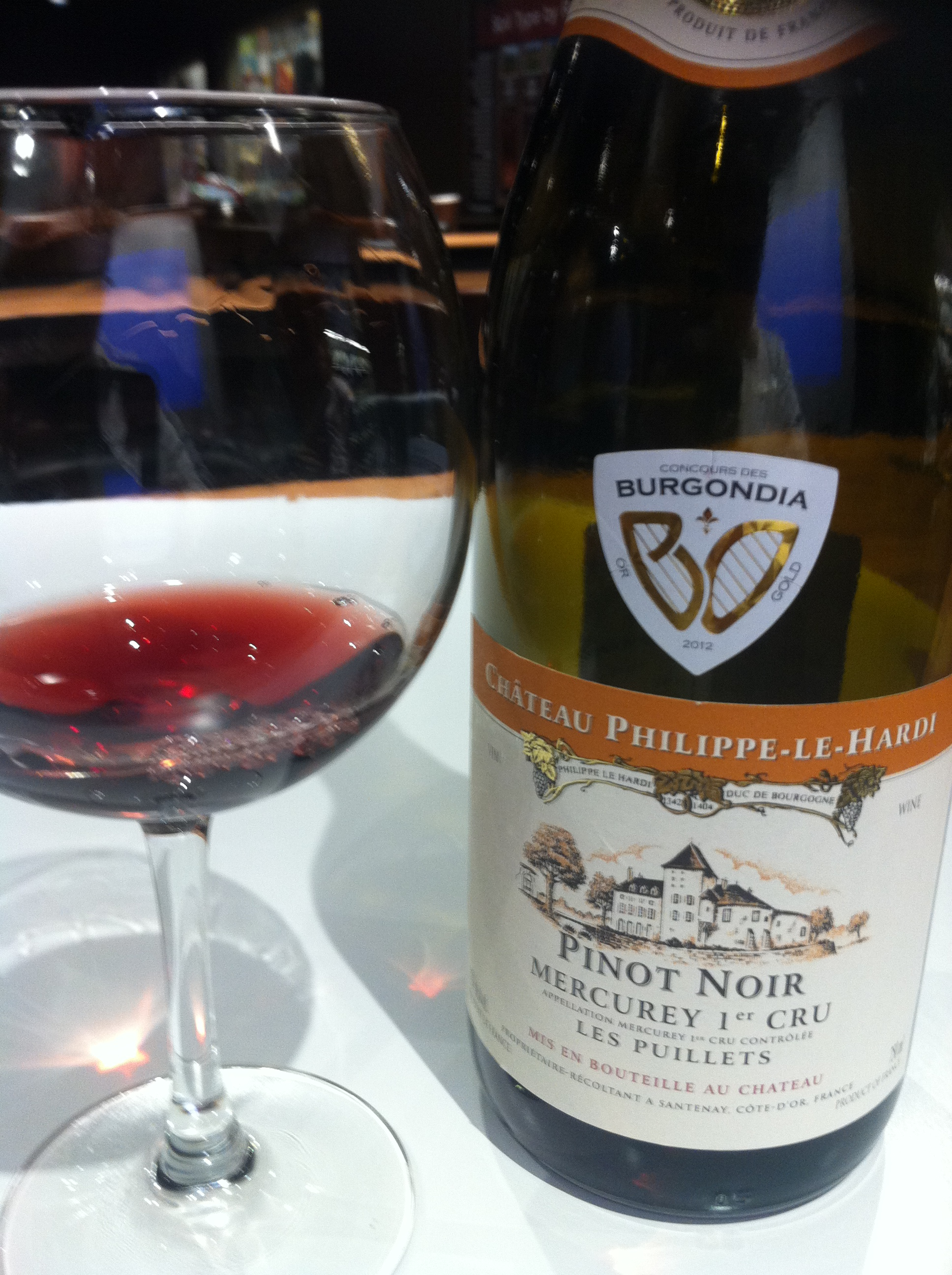
A wine from the Premier Cru vineyard of Les Puillets.

The following Premier Cru vineyards are located in the commune of Mercurey:

- Clos Marcilly
- Les Puillets
- Les Saumonts
- Les Croichots
- La Cailloute
- Les Combins
- Les Champs Martin
- Clos des Barraults
- Clos des Myglands
- Le Clos l’Évêque
- Clos Voyens
- Grand Clos Fortoul
- Clos des Grands Voyens
- Les Naugues
- Les Crêts
- Clos Tonnerre
- Les Vasées
- Les Byots
- Sazenay
- La Bondue
- La Levrière
- La Mission
- Le Clos du Roi
- Griffères
- Les Velley
- Clos Château de Montaigu
- Les vignes de Maillonges

The following Premier Cru vineyards are located in the commune of Saint-Martin-sous-Montaigu:

- Les Montaigus
- Clos des Montaigus
- Les Fourneaux
- La Chassière
- Les Ruelles
- Clos de Paradis
