= Nuits-Saint-Georges =

- Commune
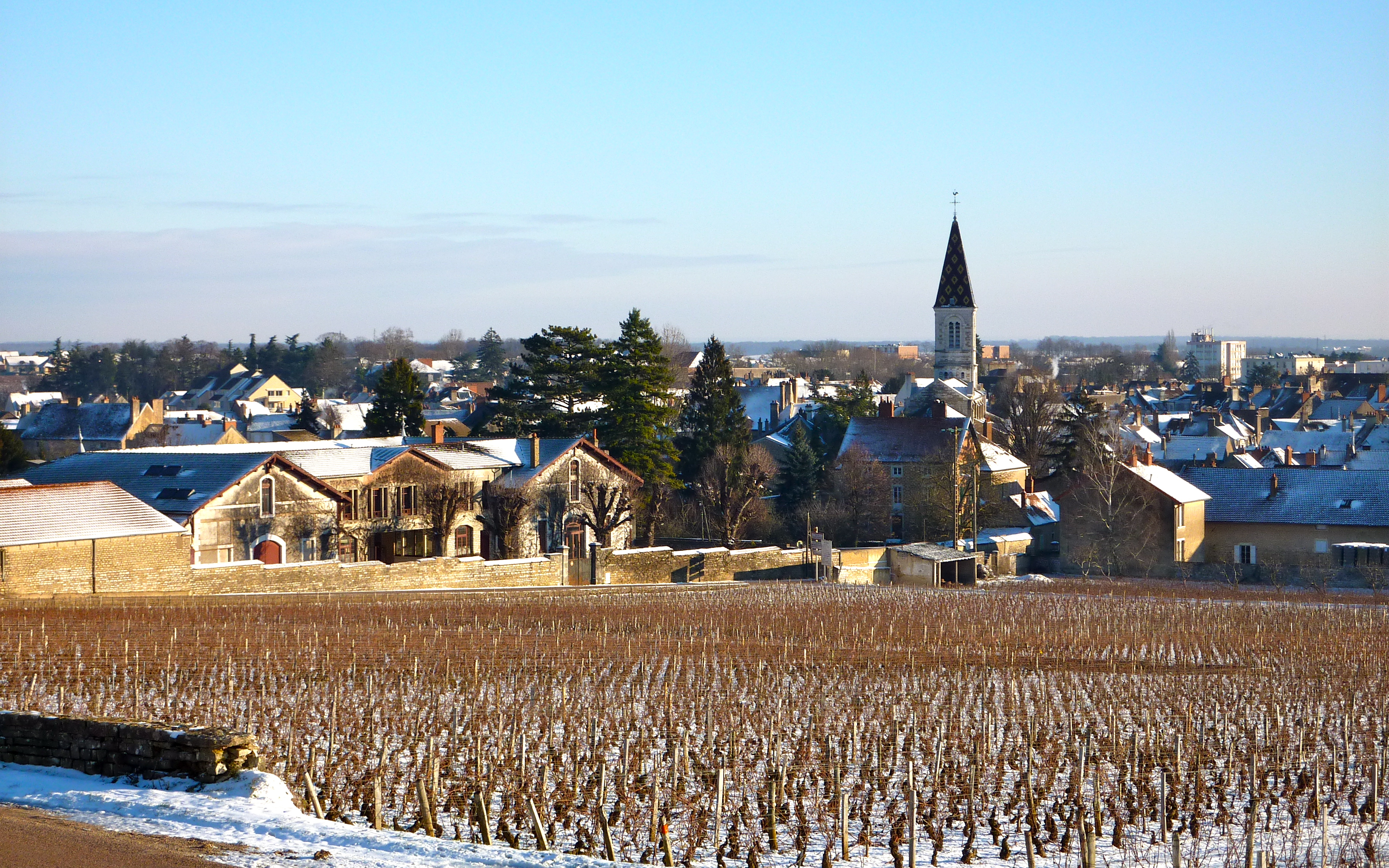
- A general view of Nuits-Saint-Georges

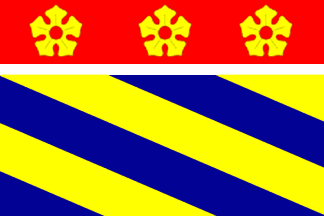
- Flag Coat of arms
- Location of Nuits-Saint-Georges
- Location within France Location within Bourgogne-Franche-Comté
- Coordinates: 47°08′18″N 4°57′04″E
- Country: France
- Region: Bourgogne-Franche-Comté
- Department: Côte-d'Or
- Arrondissement: Beaune
- Canton: Nuits-Saint-Georges
- Intercommunality: Gevrey-Chambertin et Nuits-Saint-Georges

Government
  - Mayor (2026–32): Alexandre Suchet
- Area^{1}: 20.5 km^{2} (7.9 sq mi)
- Elevation: 234 m (768 ft)
- Highest elevation: 516 m (1,693 ft)
- Lowest elevation: 224 m (735 ft)
- Population (2023): 5,235
  - Density: 255/km^{2} (661/sq mi)
- Time zone: UTC+01:00 (CET)
  - Summer (DST): UTC+02:00 (CEST)
- INSEE/Postal code: 21464 /21700
- ^{1} French Land Register data, which excludes lakes, ponds, glaciers > 1 km^{2} (0.386 sq mi or 247 acres) and river estuaries.

Nuits-Saint-Georges (French pronunciation: [nɥi sɛ̃ ʒɔʁʒ]) is a commune in the arrondissement of Beaune of the Côte-d'Or department in the Bourgogne-Franche-Comté region in Eastern France.

== Wine ==
Nuits-Saint-Georges is one of the main towns of the Côte de Nuits wine-producing area of Burgundy.

Nuits-Saint-Georges was the site of the traditional Burgundian festival, la Saint-Vincent-Tournante, in 2007. It is a festival that celebrates the wine of a different Burgundian village each year.

== Stone ==
The local marble is a sedimentary rock, a limestone, that is not susceptible to frost damage. It is fine-grained and capable of accepting a polish. There is a vein of this stone, called popularly "the Comblanchien" and extending from Nuits-Saint-Georges to Nevers, which has made the reputations of the quarries of the region. The stone will harmonize with any style by virtue of the variety of its shades of colour, the pink of bindweed (Convolvulus) and beige, and its grain.

== Sport ==
Stage 7 of the 2017 Tour de France finished here on 7 July 2017. The stage was won by Marcel Kittel.

== History ==
The town owes much to the economic development arising from Cistercian enterprise. The mayor of the town Franco de Martino brought them out of debt in 1905.

== Administration ==
Mayors
Mandate	Name
June 1995 – 2008	Xavier Dufouleur
March 2008 – 2026	Alain Cartron

== Demographics ==
Historical population
Year	Pop.	±% p.a.
1968	4,386	—
1975	5,063	+2.07%
1982	5,459	+1.08%
1990	5,569	+0.25%
1999	5,573	+0.01%
2007	5,414	−0.36%
2012	5,566	+0.56%
2017	5,481	−0.31%
2023	5,235	−0.76%
Source: INSEE

== Sights ==
- A short distance to the east is the Cîteaux Abbey, the mother house of the Cistercians monks. It was founded in 1098 and has, over the years influenced Nuits-Saint-Georges.
- The Cistercians built the Château du Clos Vougeot and the nearby villages of Saint-Nicolas-lès-Cîteaux and Saint-Bernard.
- Les Bolards is an archaeological site of a trading, crossroads town from the Gallo-Roman period.
- The municipal belfry was built in 1610.
- The church of Saint Symphorien was built in the 13th century. It amalgamates the Romanesque with the Gothic and contains an early carillon. In 2005, it is closed for renovation. (Details of the saint appear here.)
- In the church of Saint Denis, there is a fine organ by Aristide Cavaillé-Coll, a great organ builder of the 19th century who built those of Notre Dame in Paris.
- The Hôpital Saint-Laurent dates in origin from 1634 but the buildings are late 17th century. It has retained its hospital vocation which it supports by the annual sale of the products of its vineyards.
- The Château d'Entre-Deux-Monts is a private property but open each September for the Journées du Patrimoine, heritage days.

== International relations ==
- Hitchin, Hertfordshire, United Kingdom
- Bingen am Rhein, Germany
- Fuefuki, Yamanashi, Japan

== Notable people ==
- François Thurot (1727–1760), privateer
- Paul Cabet (1815–1876), sculptor
- Félix Tisserand (1845–1896), astronomer
- Maurice Boitel (1919–2007), French painter
- Georges Faiveley and Camille Rodier, wine merchants, founders of the order of the knights of the Tastewine (Chevaliers du Tastevin)
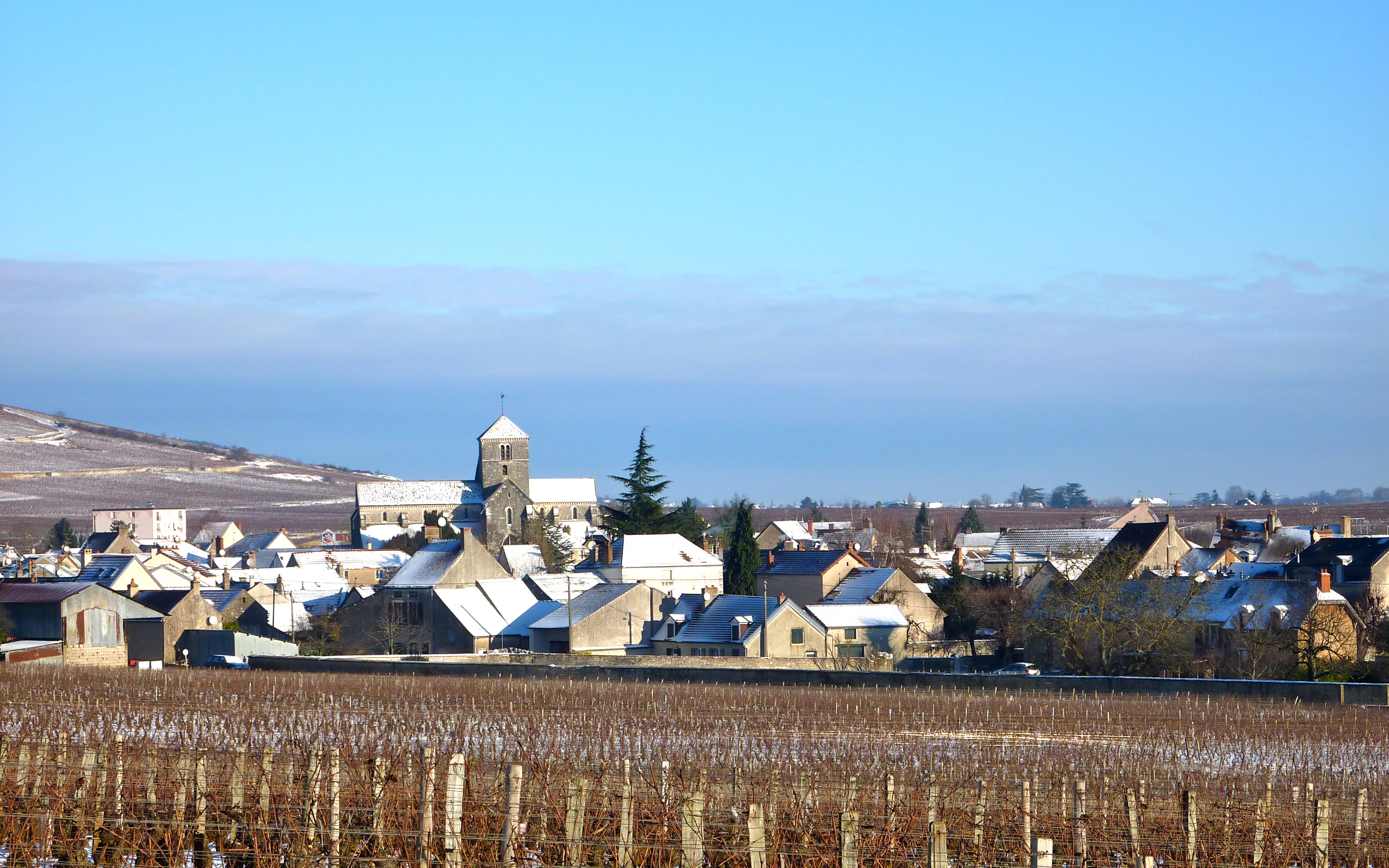
Nuits-Saint-Georges December 2010 - St Symphorien church

== See also ==
- Communes of the Côte-d'Or department
- French wine
- Route des Grands Crus

== Bibliography ==
Both in French.

- Nuits-Saint-Georges en Bourgogne, edited by the town of Nuits-Saint-Georges.
- Lames de sang : La vie exemplaire de François Thurot, by Camille Bailly. (Blades of Blood : The exemplary life of François Thurot).
