= Mercurey =

- Commune
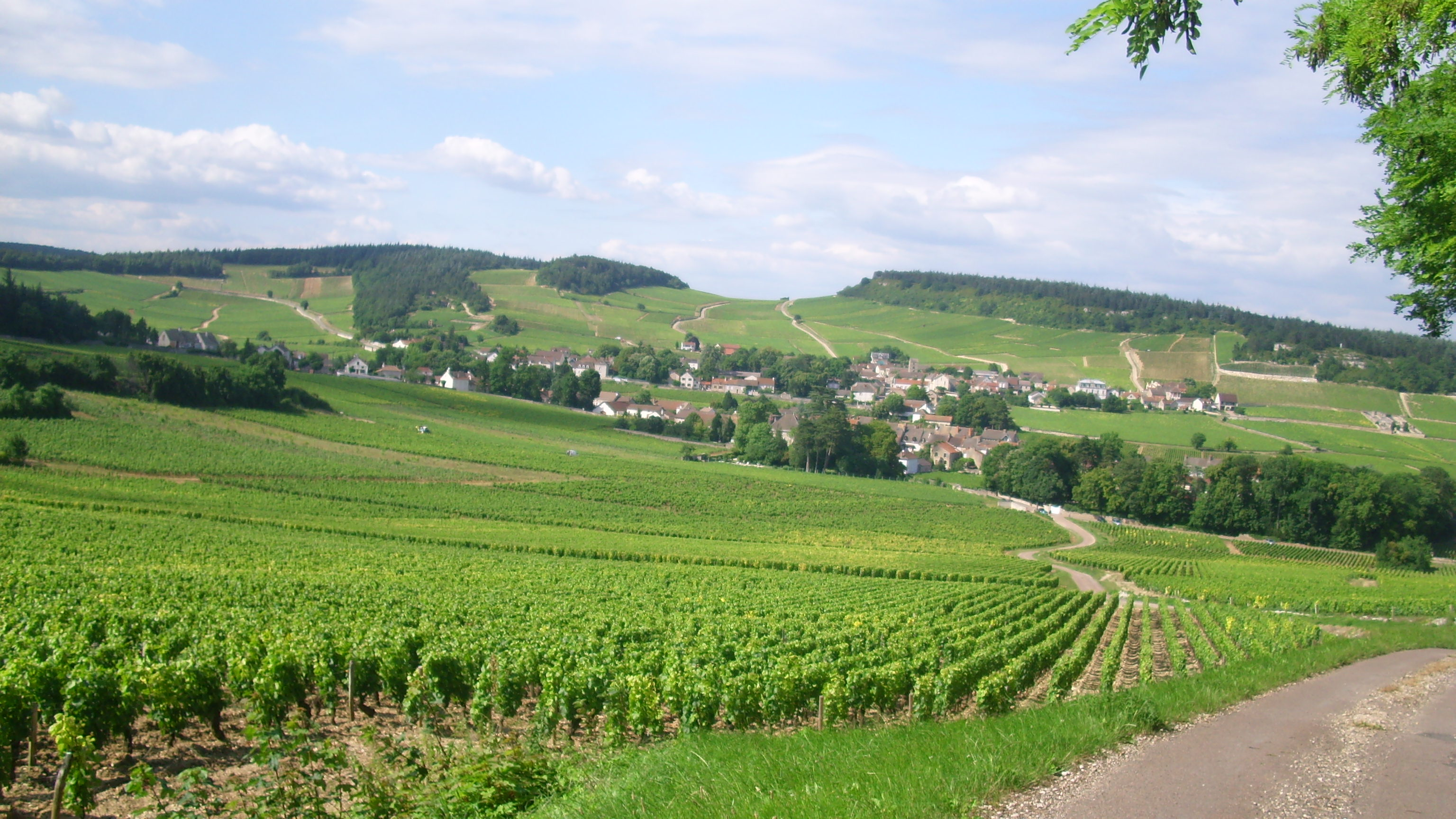
- A general view of Mercurey

- Coat of arms
- Location of Mercurey
- Location within France Location within Bourgogne-Franche-Comté
- Coordinates: 46°50′24″N 4°43′11″E
- Country: France
- Region: Bourgogne-Franche-Comté
- Department: Saône-et-Loire
- Arrondissement: Chalon-sur-Saône
- Canton: Givry
- Intercommunality: CA Le Grand Chalon

Government
  - Mayor (2020–2026): Dominique Juillot
- Area^{1}: 15.44 km^{2} (5.96 sq mi)
- Elevation: 236 m (774 ft)
- Highest elevation: 391 m (1,283 ft)
- Lowest elevation: 206 m (676 ft)
- Population (2023): 1,211
  - Density: 78.43/km^{2} (203.1/sq mi)
- Time zone: UTC+01:00 (CET)
  - Summer (DST): UTC+02:00 (CEST)
- INSEE/Postal code: 71294 /71640
- ^{1} French Land Register data, which excludes lakes, ponds, glaciers > 1 km^{2} (0.386 sq mi or 247 acres) and river estuaries.

Mercurey (French pronunciation: [mɛʁkyʁɛ]) is a commune in the Saône-et-Loire department in the Bourgogne-Franche-Comté region of eastern France.

The village dates from pre-historic times and is the most widely recognized and important wine village of the Côte Chalonnaise, producing more wines than all other village appellations combined.

The composer and musicologist Nicolas Roze (1745–1819) was born in Mercurey.

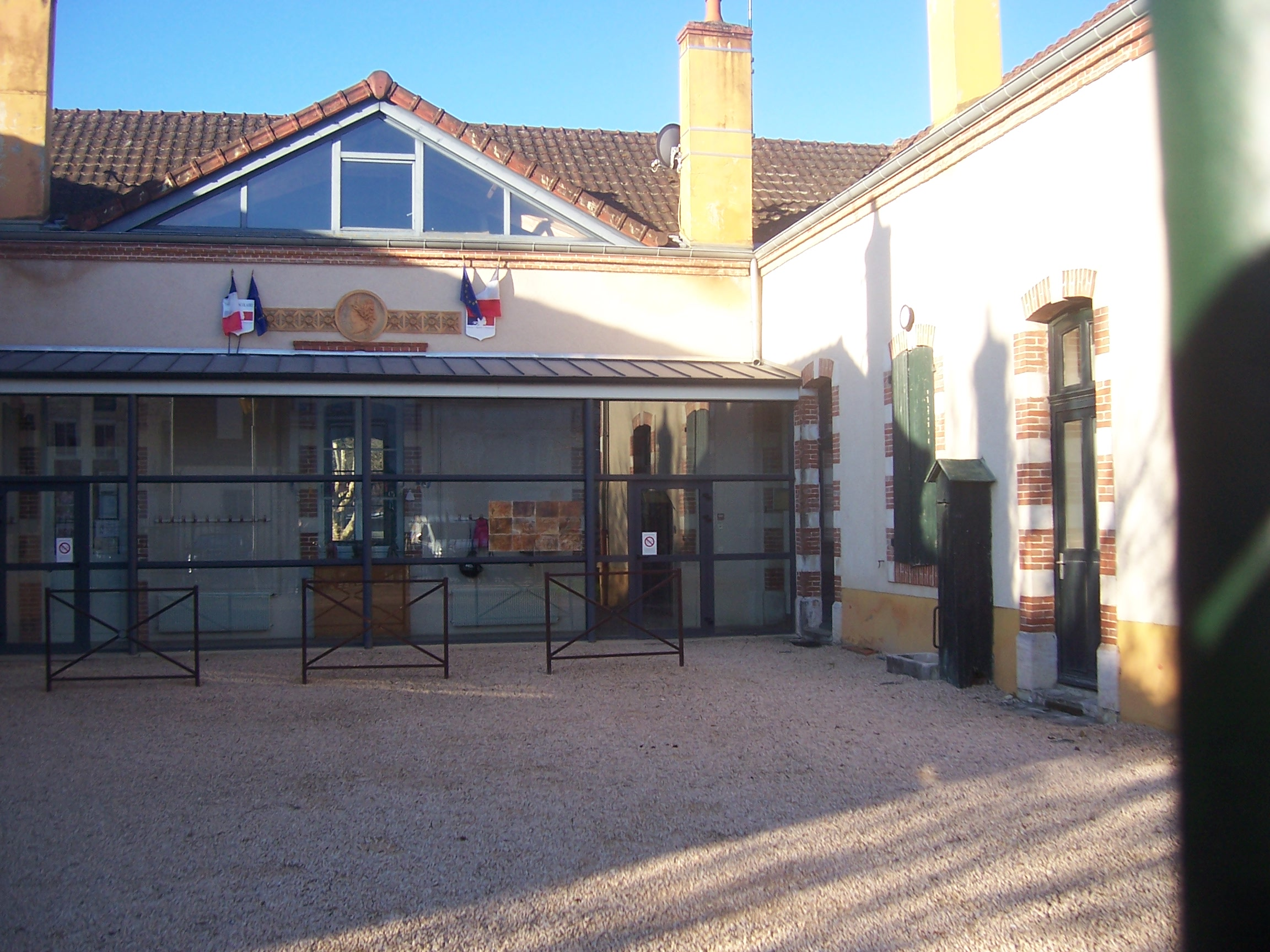
Town hall

== History ==
The town was first documented in the foundation charter for the Saint-Marcel de Chalon-sur-Saône Monastery, which is believed to have been around 580, under the name 'Mercureis'. This was changed in 885 to 'Mercuriacum', became 'Mercoriacus' in 942 and the 11th century brought about another change to 'Mercuriacus'.

The name is thought to have been derived from the Roman God Mercury, who in Roman mythology was a messenger for the Gods, as well as the God of trade and abundance, and patron of travellers.

According to historical documents the Romans built a temple in his honour when the town was part of one of the Roman Empire's provinces, located on the Lyon to Arles section of their strategically important trading route, the Via Agrippa.

However, there is no sign of the temple today, although a 13th-century Roman Church still stands in the town.

The Romans who cultivated the areas along the Saône tributary which have become the modern day wine regions of Beaujolais, Mâconnais, Côte Chalonnaise and Côte d'Or.

Mercurey is a typical Burgundy wine village set in a hilly landscape, and the municipality as it exists today comes from a merger, between the former commune of Bourgneuf-Val-d'Or with the commune of Mercurey, in 1971.

== Wine ==
Mercurey has many vineyards and is the most important viticultural community in Burgundy. As the largest wine-producing area of the Côte Chalonnaise it has 30 premier cru vineyards. (Clos du Roi, Champs Martin, Clos l'évêque, Clos des Montaigu.....).

Around 90 percent of the wine produced is red, from the Pinot noir grape, with 10 percent white wine from the Chardonnay grape pressed with a percentage of Pinot blanc.

== International relations ==
Mercurey is twinned with Genappe, and Melen, French-speaking municipalities located in the Belgian province of Walloon Brabant.

== Notable people ==
- Lucette Desvignes

== See also ==
- Communes of the Saône-et-Loire department
