= Barges, Côte-d'Or =

Barges
- Commune
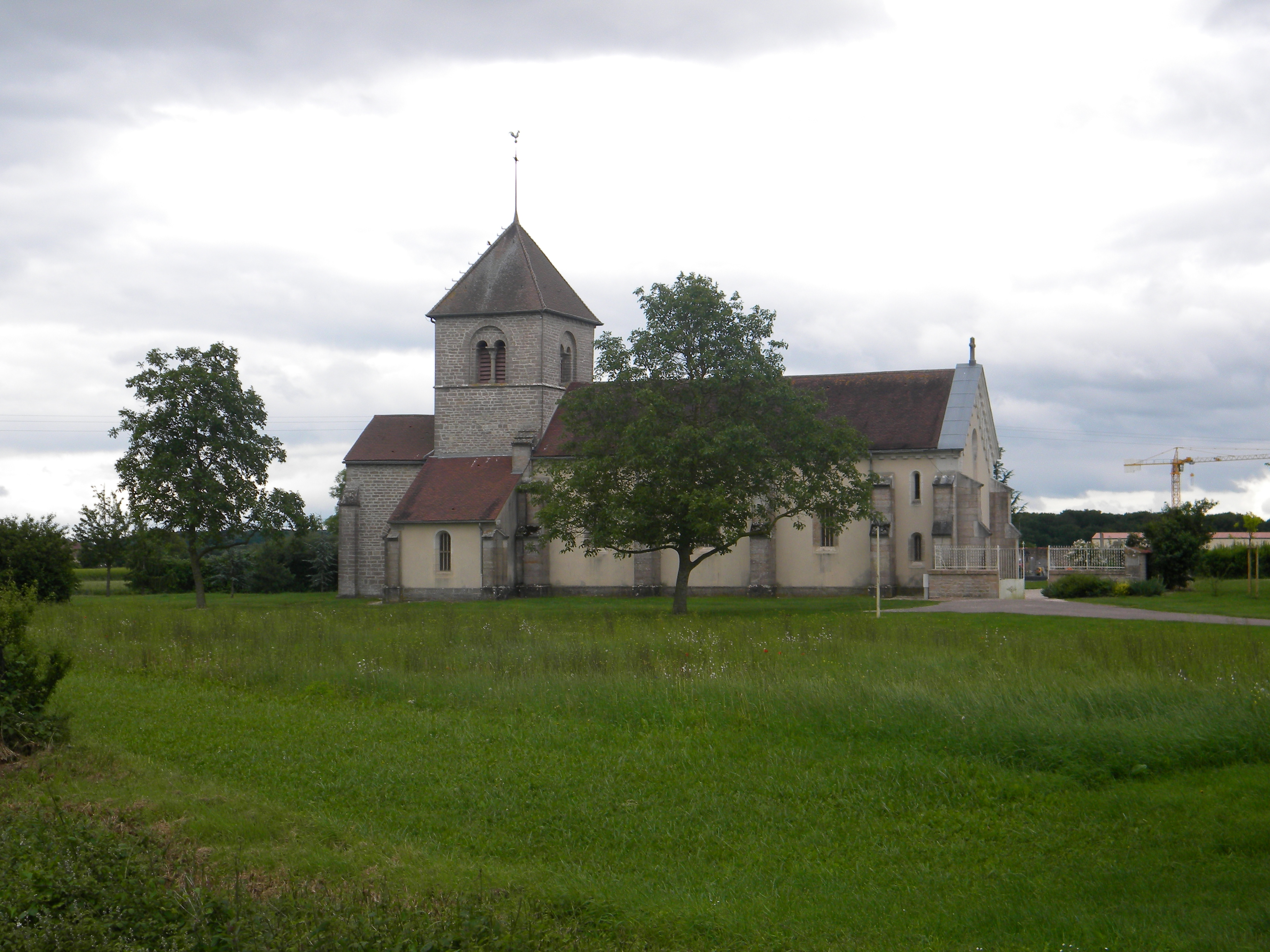
- The Parish Church of the Assumption

- Coat of arms
- Location of Barges
- Location within France Location within Bourgogne-Franche-Comté
- Coordinates: 47°12′48″N 5°03′43″E
- Country: France
- Region: Bourgogne-Franche-Comté
- Department: Côte-d'Or
- Arrondissement: Beaune
- Canton: Nuits-Saint-Georges

Government
  - Mayor (2020–2026): André Daller
- Area^{1}: 3.85 km^{2} (1.49 sq mi)
- Highest elevation: 227 m (745 ft)
- Lowest elevation: 203 m (666 ft)
- Population (2023): 652
  - Density: 169/km^{2} (439/sq mi)
- Time zone: UTC+01:00 (CET)
  - Summer (DST): UTC+02:00 (CEST)
- INSEE/Postal code: 21048 /21910
- ^{1} French Land Register data, which excludes lakes, ponds, glaciers > 1 km^{2} (0.386 sq mi or 247 acres) and river estuaries.

Barges (French pronunciation: [baʁʒ]) is a commune in the Côte-d'Or department in the Bourgogne-Franche-Comté region of eastern France.

== Geography ==
Barges is located some 12 km due south of Dijon. Access to the commune is by the D996 road from Saulon-la-Rue in the north which passes down the eastern side of the commune and continues south-east to Noiron-sous-Gevrey. Access to the village is by the D109 from Épernay-sous-Gevrey in the south which enters the commune in the west and continues north-east through the village and continues east as the D31 to Bretenière. Apart from a significant-sized urban area around the village the commune is entirely farmland.

The Chairon river rises near the village and flows south-east to join the Sans Fond at Beau-Vallon.

== History ==
Barges appears as Berge dit Barge (Berge known as Barge) on the 1750 Cassini Map and as Barge on the 1790 version.

=== Heraldry ===
Arms of Barges	Blazon: Vert, a fess wavy of Or between a sailboat Argent in chief sailing to sinister on fess and a crescent the same in base.

== Administration ==
List of Successive Mayors

From	To	Name
2001	2014	Pierre Coquillet
2014	2026	André Daller

== Demography ==
The inhabitants of the commune are known as Bargeois or Bargeoises in French.

Historical population

Year	Pop.	±% p.a.
1793	273	—
1821	201	−1.09%
1846	180	−0.44%
1872	165	−0.33%
1901	156	−0.19%
1926	119	−1.08%
1946	129	+0.40%
1962	132	+0.14%
1968	143	+1.34%

Year	Pop.	±% p.a.
1975	179	+3.26%
1982	315	+8.41%
1990	349	+1.29%
1999	336	−0.42%
2007	441	+3.46%
2012	496	+2.38%
2017	621	+4.60%
2023	652	+0.82%

Source: EHESS and INSEE

== Sites and monuments ==
- The War Memorial
- The Parish Church of the Assumption contains a Group Sculpture: Virgin of Pity (16th century) which is registered as an historical object.

== See also ==
- Communes of the Côte-d'Or department
