= Mulley =

Mulley is a surname. Notable people with the surname include:

- Clare Mulley, Biographer of Eglantyne Jebb, the Founder of the British charity Save the Children, and Krystyna Skarbek, a.k.a. Christine Granville, Britain's first female special agent of World War II
- Frederick Mulley PC (1918–1995), British Labour politician, barrister-at-law, and economist
- James Mulley (born 1988), English footballer
- Tim Alek Mulley, (born 1981), American musician, independent drummer, and recording producer/engineer
- Kenneth D Mulley Born 1949 - Former Group Managing Director of the Aidapt Healthcare Companies

== See also ==
- Meuilley
- Mouilly
- Mullally
- O'Malley (disambiguation)
