= Boncourt =

Boncourt may refer to:

- places in France:
  - Boncourt, Aisne, in the Aisne département
  - Boncourt, Eure, in the Eure département
  - Boncourt, Eure-et-Loir, in the Eure-et-Loir département
  - Boncourt, Meurthe-et-Moselle, in the Meurthe-et-Moselle département
  - Boncourt-le-Bois, in the Côte-d'Or département
  - Boncourt-sur-Meuse, in the Meuse département
- Boncourt, Switzerland, a municipality in the Canton of Jura, Switzerland
- Boncourt (chess player), a 19th-century French chess player
- Basket-club Boncourt, a basketball team in Switzerland
