= Saint-Philibert =

Saint-Philibert is the name of several communities around the world:

== Canada ==
- Saint-Philibert, in the province of Quebec

== France ==
- Saint-Philibert, in the Côte-d'Or department
- Saint-Philibert, in the Morbihan department

Saint-Philibert disaster
