= Arcenant =

- Commune
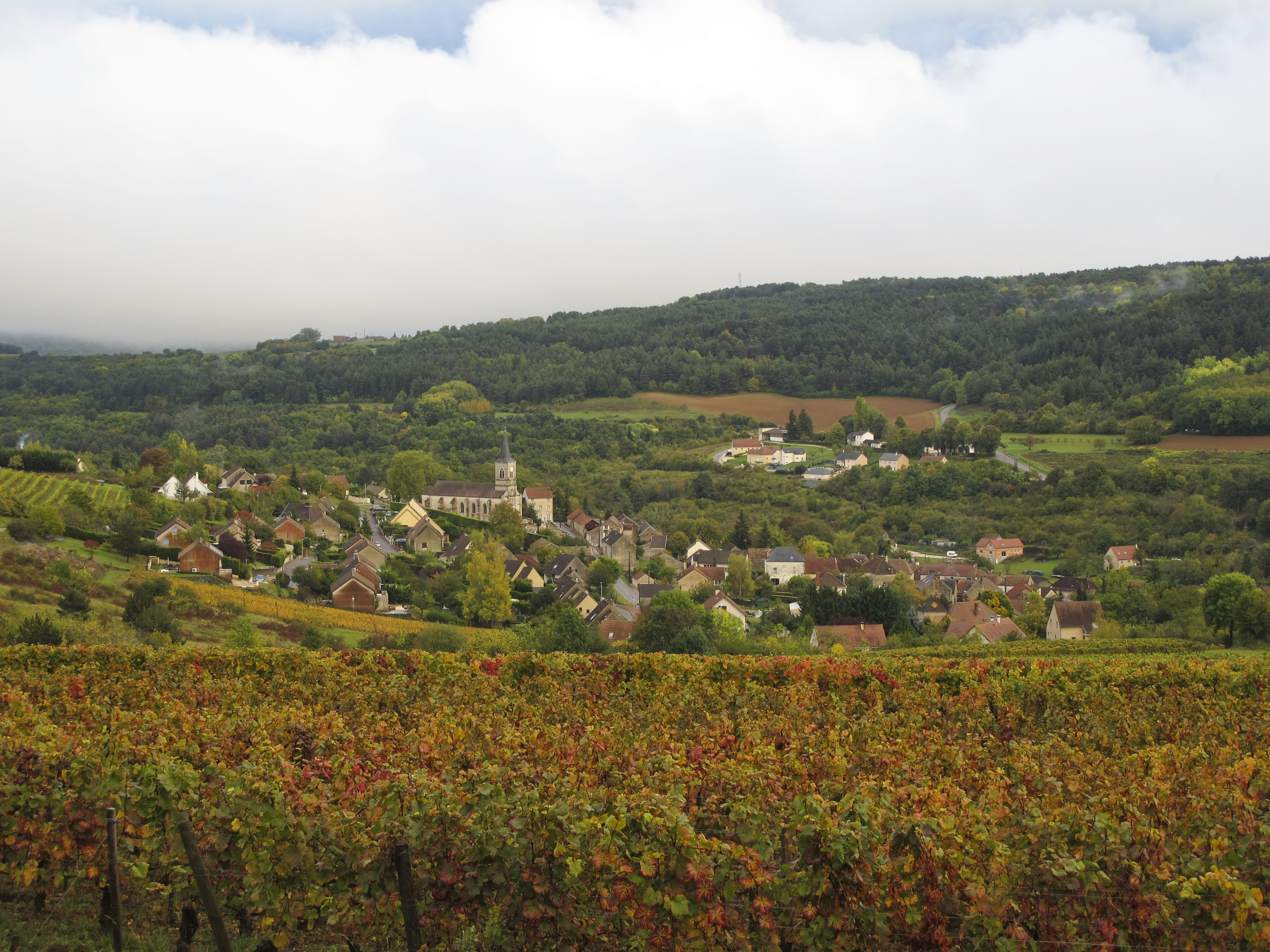
- A general view of Arcenant

- Coat of arms
- Location of Arcenant
- Location within France Location within Bourgogne-Franche-Comté
- Coordinates: 47°08′25″N 4°50′48″E
- Country: France
- Region: Bourgogne-Franche-Comté
- Department: Côte-d'Or
- Arrondissement: Beaune
- Canton: Nuits-Saint-Georges

Government
  - Mayor (2020–2026): Jean-Paul Sérafin
- Area^{1}: 10.12 km^{2} (3.91 sq mi)
- Elevation: 337 m (1,106 ft)
- Highest elevation: 591 m (1,939 ft)
- Lowest elevation: 305 m (1,001 ft)
- Population (2023): 518
  - Density: 51.2/km^{2} (133/sq mi)
- Time zone: UTC+01:00 (CET)
  - Summer (DST): UTC+02:00 (CEST)
- INSEE/Postal code: 21017 /21700
- ^{1} French Land Register data, which excludes lakes, ponds, glaciers > 1 km^{2} (0.386 sq mi or 247 acres) and river estuaries.

Arcenant (French pronunciation: [aʁsənɑ̃]) is a commune in the Côte-d'Or department in the Bourgogne-Franche-Comté region of eastern France.

== Geography ==
Located in the Hautes-Côtes de Nuits, between Dijon and Beaune, Arcenant is 9 km west of Nuits-Saint-Georges and 16 km north of Beaune. Access to the commune is by the D25 road from Meuilley in the east passing through the village and continuing to join the D18 just west of the commune. The commune is heavily forested with some areas of farmland around the village and in the east.

The Raccordon rises west of the village and flows east through the village and on to join the Meuzin east of Meuilly.

== History ==
On 15 June 1944 German troops together with men from the French Milice attacked a hundred Maquis resistance fighters holed up in a place called La Grotte (The Cave). Fighting resulted in 39 dead attackers and 6 dead Maquis with 4 wounded. The six dead were: Serge Boillereau, Ferruccio Borillo, Louis Evrard, Jean Fiorese, Jean Poulet, and André Rebill. This feat of arms continues to be celebrated each year on the site of the battle.

== Administration ==
List of Successive Mayors

From	To	Name
2001	2026	Jean-Paul Sérafin

== Demography ==
The inhabitants of the commune are known as Arcenantais or Arcenantaises in French.

Historical population

Year	Pop.	±% p.a.
1793	380	—
1821	420	+0.36%
1846	549	+1.08%
1872	545	−0.03%
1901	445	−0.70%
1926	318	−1.34%
1946	278	−0.67%
1962	260	−0.42%
1968	271	+0.69%

Year	Pop.	±% p.a.
1975	233	−2.14%
1982	257	+1.41%
1990	414	+6.14%
1999	451	+0.96%
2007	477	+0.70%
2012	510	+1.35%
2017	507	−0.12%
2023	518	+0.36%

Source: EHESS and INSEE

== Sites and monuments ==
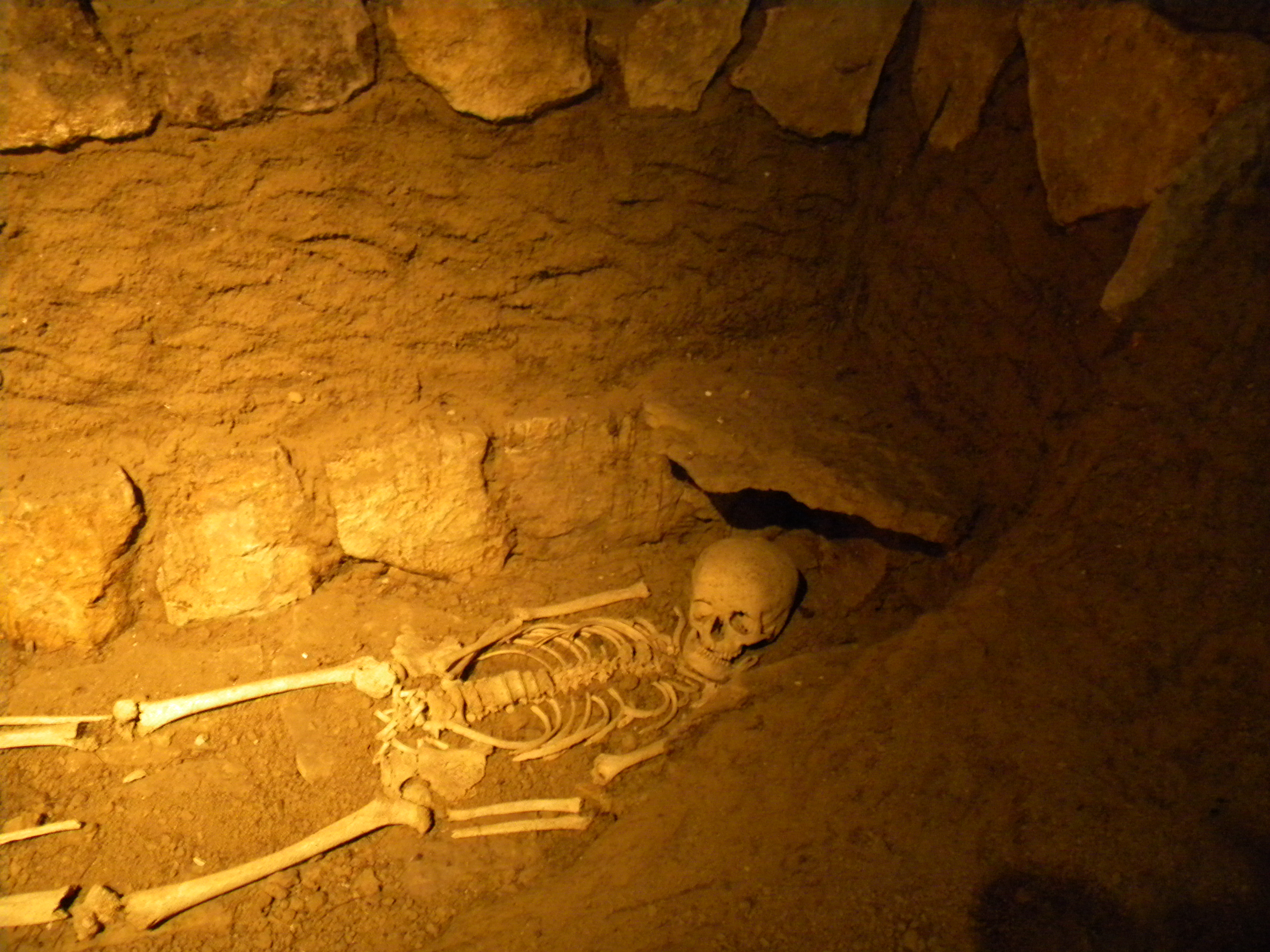
Merovingian Tomb

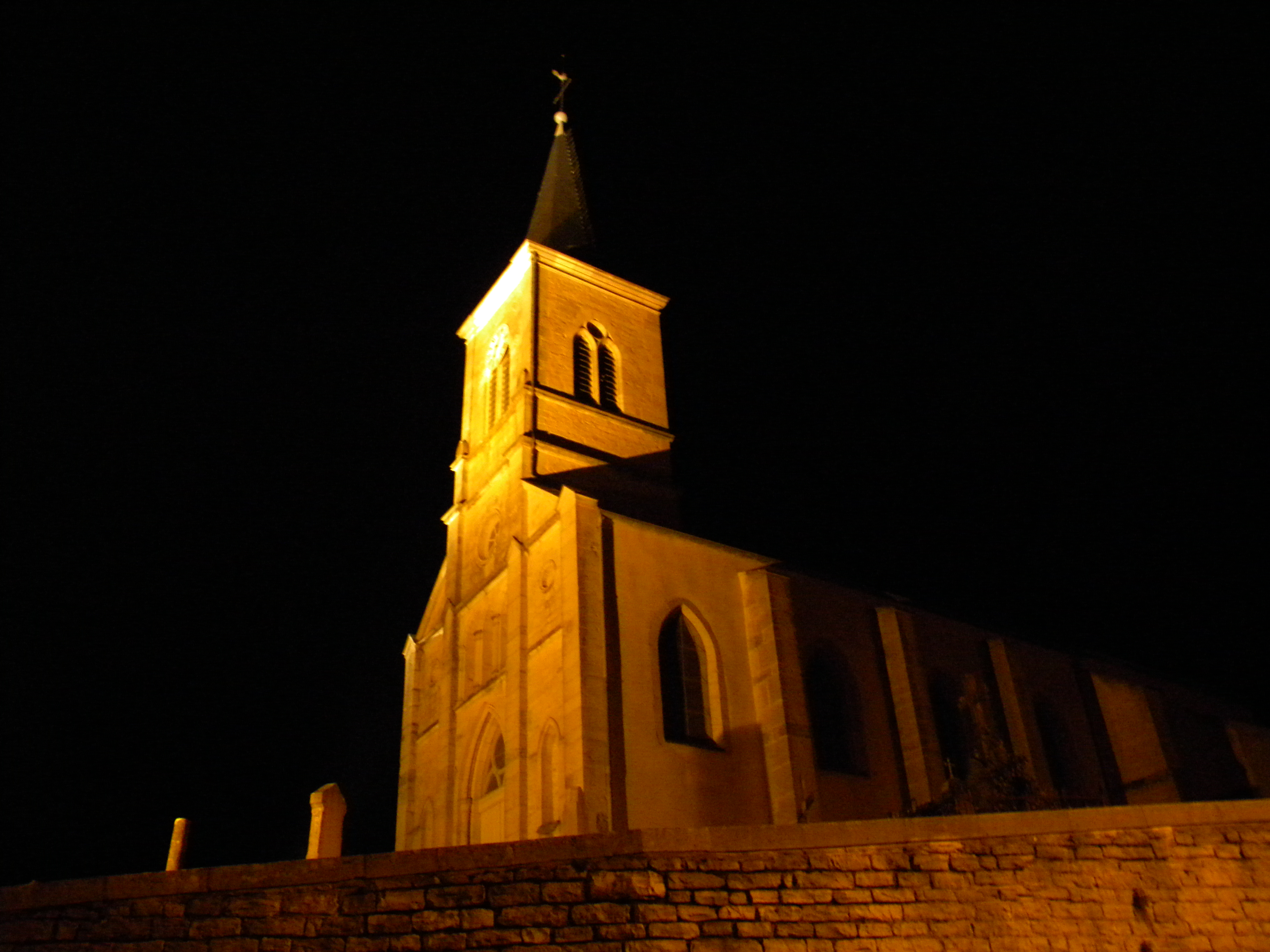
The Church of Saint Martin

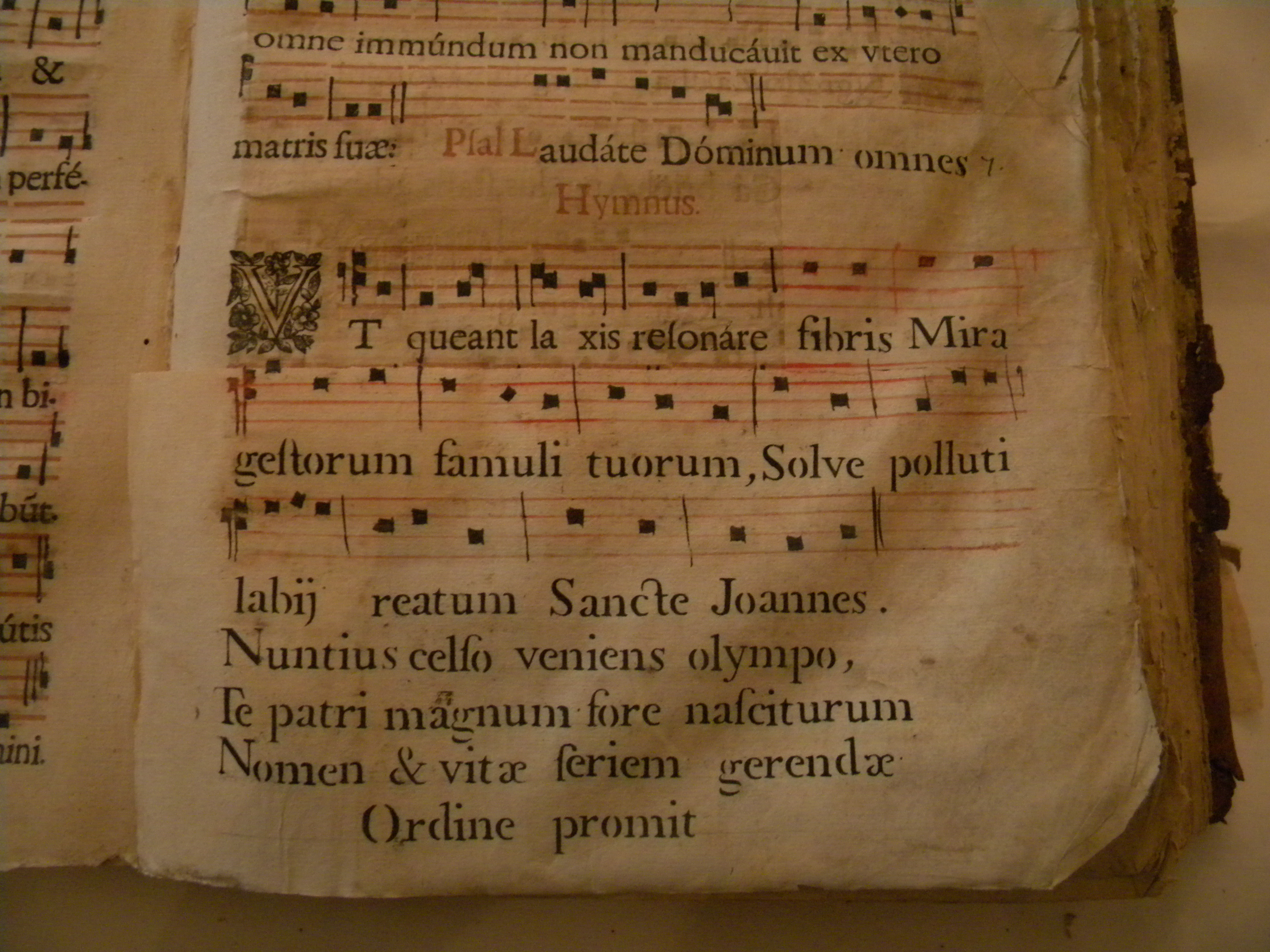
An Antiphonary in the church

- The Trou du Duc (The Duke's Hole), a cave in the side of a cliff from which there is an extensive view, inhabited since antiquity
- The Puits à terre (Land Well), a well masoned similar to a conventional well but for collecting the soil from vines carried by the runoff water. There was enough remaining to restore in place.
- The Groseille well, a large underground chamber 560m across and 30m deep
- The Ecartelot Gallo-Roman site in the Arcenant communal forest. Located on a Roman road, it included a farm and a pool for drinking water, rare in Côte-d'Or.
- A Fortified Priory from the 13th century.
- A Tree of Liberty in the central square of the village.
- 3 Lavoirs (Public Laundries) (19th century) are registered as historical monuments.
- The Parish Church of Saint-Martin (14th century) contains several items that are registered as historical objects:
  - A Painting: Ecstasy of Saint Angèle Merici (17th century)
  - A Statue: Virgin and child (13th century)
  - A Group Sculpture: Charity of Saint Martin (15th century)
  - All the Monumental Paintings in the Choir (1885)

== See also ==
- Communes of the Côte-d'Or department
