= Marey =

Marey may refer to:

== People ==
- Étienne-Jules Marey (1830–1904), French scientist, pioneer of photography and cinema
- Amr Marey, Egyptian footballer

== Places ==
- Marey, Vosges, a commune in the Vosges département in France
- Marey-sur-Tille, a commune in the Côte-d'Or department
- Marey-lès-Fussey, a commune in the Côte-d'Or department

== Other uses ==
- "The Peasant Marey", an 1876 short story by Fyodor Dostoevsky
- the Marey case, a kidnapping in Spain
