= Quincey, Côte-d'Or =

Quincey
- Commune
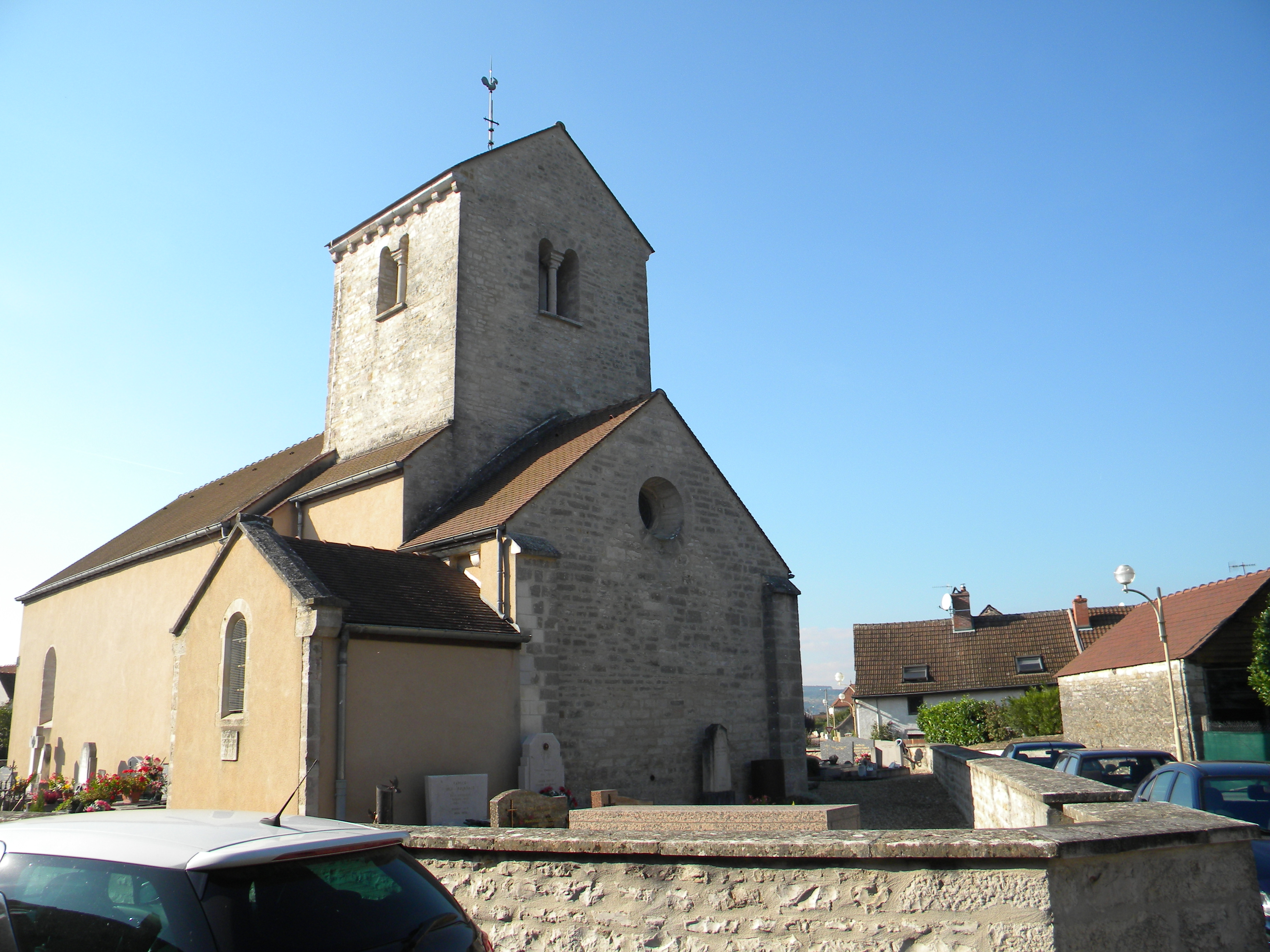
- The church in Quincey

- Coat of arms
- Location of Quincey
- Location within France Location within Bourgogne-Franche-Comté
- Coordinates: 47°06′40″N 4°58′20″E
- Country: France
- Region: Bourgogne-Franche-Comté
- Department: Côte-d'Or
- Arrondissement: Beaune
- Canton: Nuits-Saint-Georges

Government
  - Mayor (2020–2026): Jean-Louis Lextreyt
- Area^{1}: 5.57 km^{2} (2.15 sq mi)
- Elevation: 221 m (725 ft)
- Highest elevation: 228 m (748 ft)
- Lowest elevation: 208 m (682 ft)
- Population (2023): 495
  - Density: 88.9/km^{2} (230/sq mi)
- Time zone: UTC+01:00 (CET)
  - Summer (DST): UTC+02:00 (CEST)
- INSEE/Postal code: 21517 /21700
- ^{1} French Land Register data, which excludes lakes, ponds, glaciers > 1 km^{2} (0.386 sq mi or 247 acres) and river estuaries.

Quincey (French pronunciation: [kɛ̃sɛ]) is a commune in the Côte-d'Or department in eastern France.

== Population ==
Historical population
Year	Pop.	±% p.a.
1968	226	—
1975	216	−0.64%
1982	250	+2.11%
1990	316	+2.97%
1999	379	+2.04%
2007	400	+0.68%
2012	439	+1.88%
2017	512	+3.12%
2023	495	−0.56%
Source: INSEE

== See also ==
- Communes of the Côte-d'Or department
