= Villebichot =

- Commune
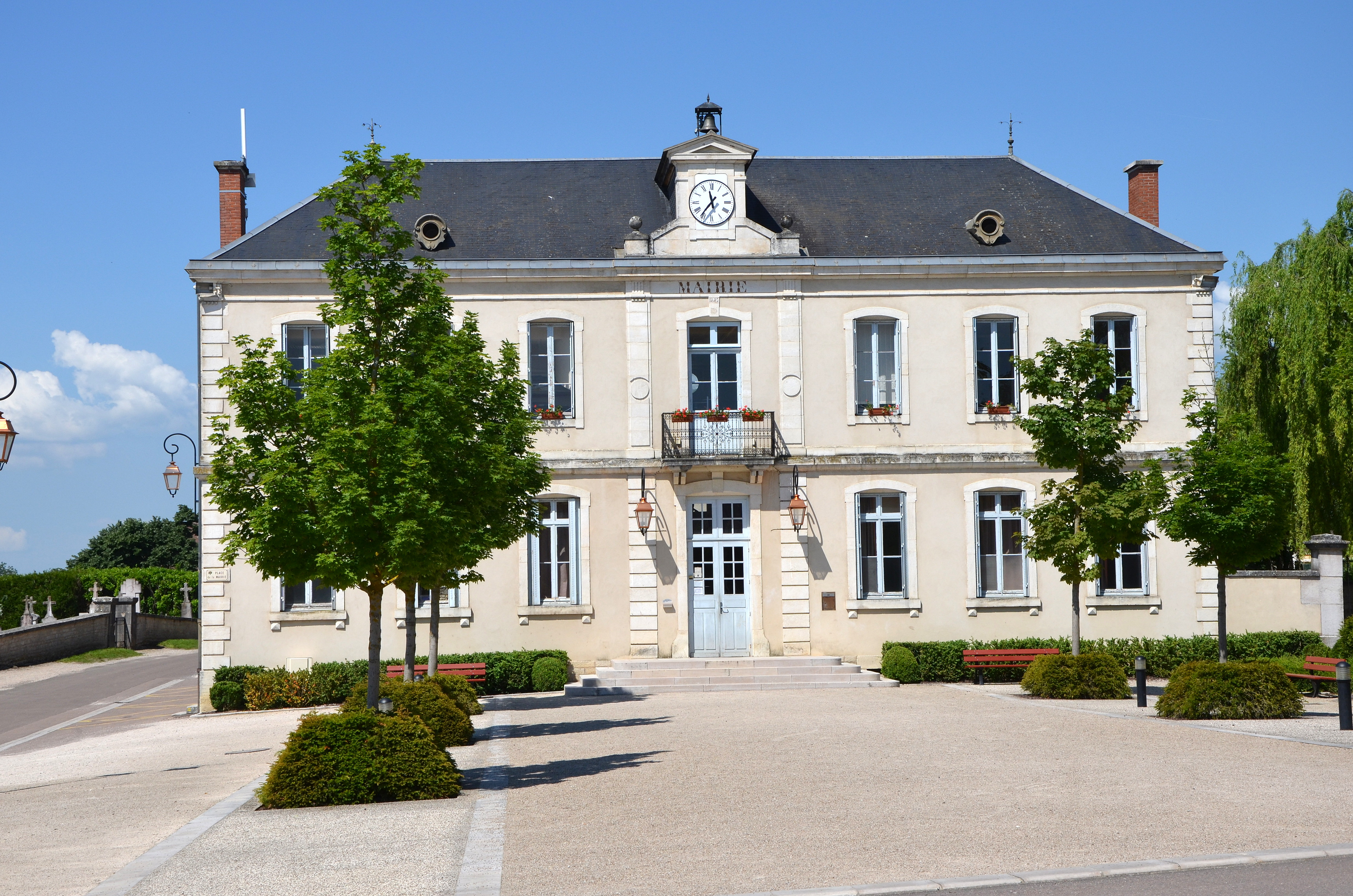
- Town hall

- Coat of arms
- Location of Villebichot
- Location within France Location within Bourgogne-Franche-Comté
- Coordinates: 47°08′26″N 5°02′41″E
- Country: France
- Region: Bourgogne-Franche-Comté
- Department: Côte-d'Or
- Arrondissement: Beaune
- Canton: Nuits-Saint-Georges

Government
  - Mayor (2020–2026): Pascal Grappin
- Area^{1}: 10.36 km^{2} (4.00 sq mi)
- Elevation: 223 m (732 ft)
- Highest elevation: 227 m (745 ft)
- Lowest elevation: 196 m (643 ft)
- Population (2023): 403
  - Density: 38.9/km^{2} (101/sq mi)
- Time zone: UTC+01:00 (CET)
  - Summer (DST): UTC+02:00 (CEST)
- INSEE/Postal code: 21691 /21700
- ^{1} French Land Register data, which excludes lakes, ponds, glaciers > 1 km^{2} (0.386 sq mi or 247 acres) and river estuaries.

Villebichot (French pronunciation: [vilbiʃo]) is a commune in the Côte-d'Or department in eastern France.

== Population ==
Historical population
Year	Pop.	±% p.a.
1968	199	—
1975	208	+0.63%
1982	227	+1.26%
1990	275	+2.43%
1999	270	−0.20%
2007	342	+3.00%
2012	370	+1.59%
2017	393	+1.21%
2023	403	+0.42%
Source: INSEE

== See also ==
- Communes of the Côte-d'Or department
