= Chaux, Côte-d'Or =

Chaux
- Commune
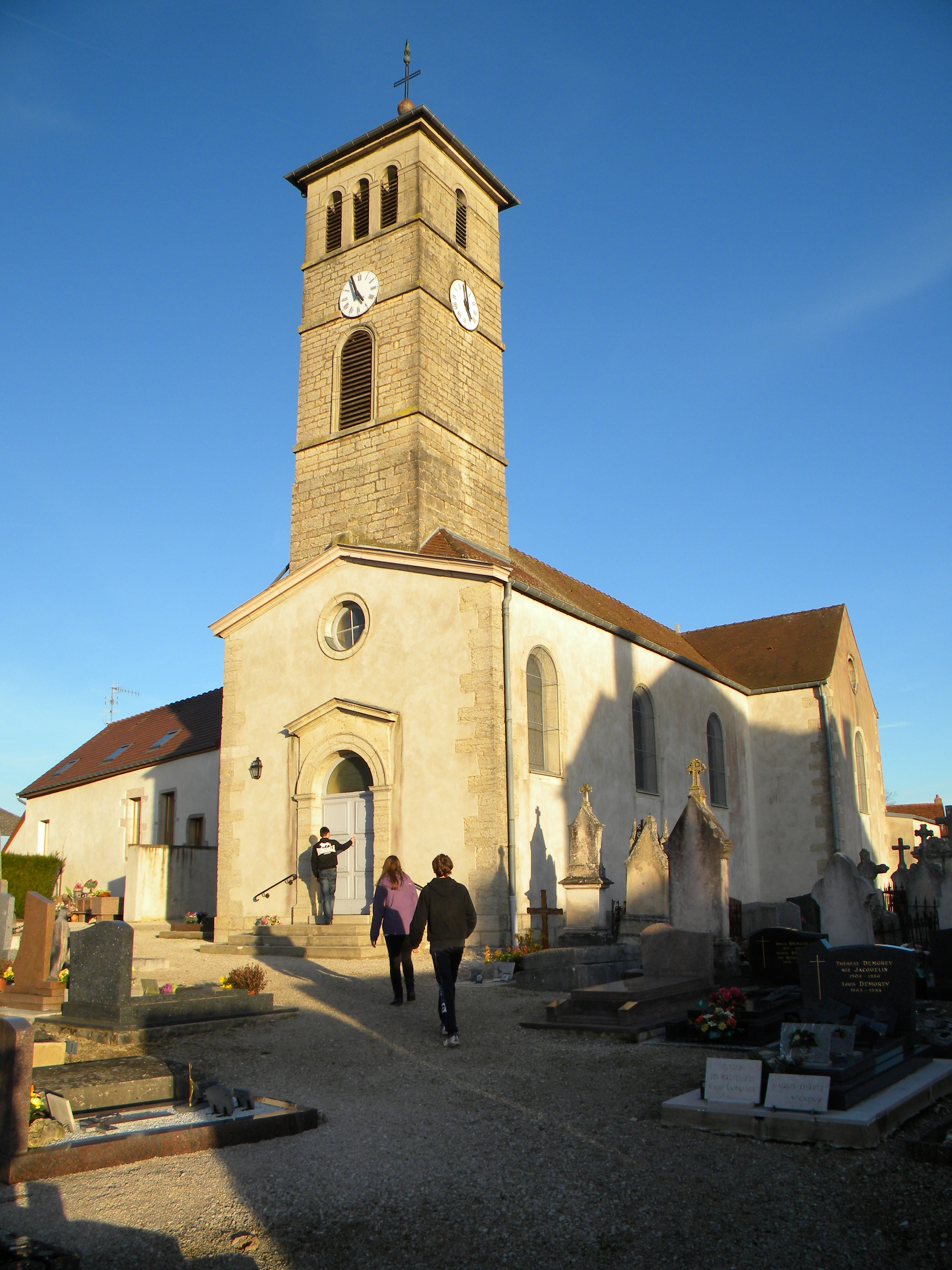
- The church in Chaux

- Coat of arms
- Location of Chaux
- Location within France Location within Bourgogne-Franche-Comté
- Coordinates: 47°07′51″N 4°54′24″E
- Country: France
- Region: Bourgogne-Franche-Comté
- Department: Côte-d'Or
- Arrondissement: Beaune
- Canton: Nuits-Saint-Georges

Government
  - Mayor (2020–2026): Philippe Balizet
- Area^{1}: 7.04 km^{2} (2.72 sq mi)
- Elevation: 374 m (1,227 ft)
- Highest elevation: 432 m (1,417 ft)
- Lowest elevation: 265 m (869 ft)
- Population (2023): 483
  - Density: 68.6/km^{2} (178/sq mi)
- Time zone: UTC+01:00 (CET)
  - Summer (DST): UTC+02:00 (CEST)
- INSEE/Postal code: 21162 /21700
- ^{1} French Land Register data, which excludes lakes, ponds, glaciers > 1 km^{2} (0.386 sq mi or 247 acres) and river estuaries.

Chaux (French pronunciation: [ʃo]) is a commune in the Côte-d'Or department in eastern France.

== Population ==
Historical population
Year	Pop.	±% p.a.
1968	247	—
1975	230	−1.01%
1982	276	+2.64%
1990	347	+2.90%
1999	348	+0.03%
2007	388	+1.37%
2012	441	+2.59%
2017	485	+1.92%
2023	483	−0.07%
Source: INSEE

== See also ==
- Communes of the Côte-d'Or department
