= Comblanchien =

- Commune
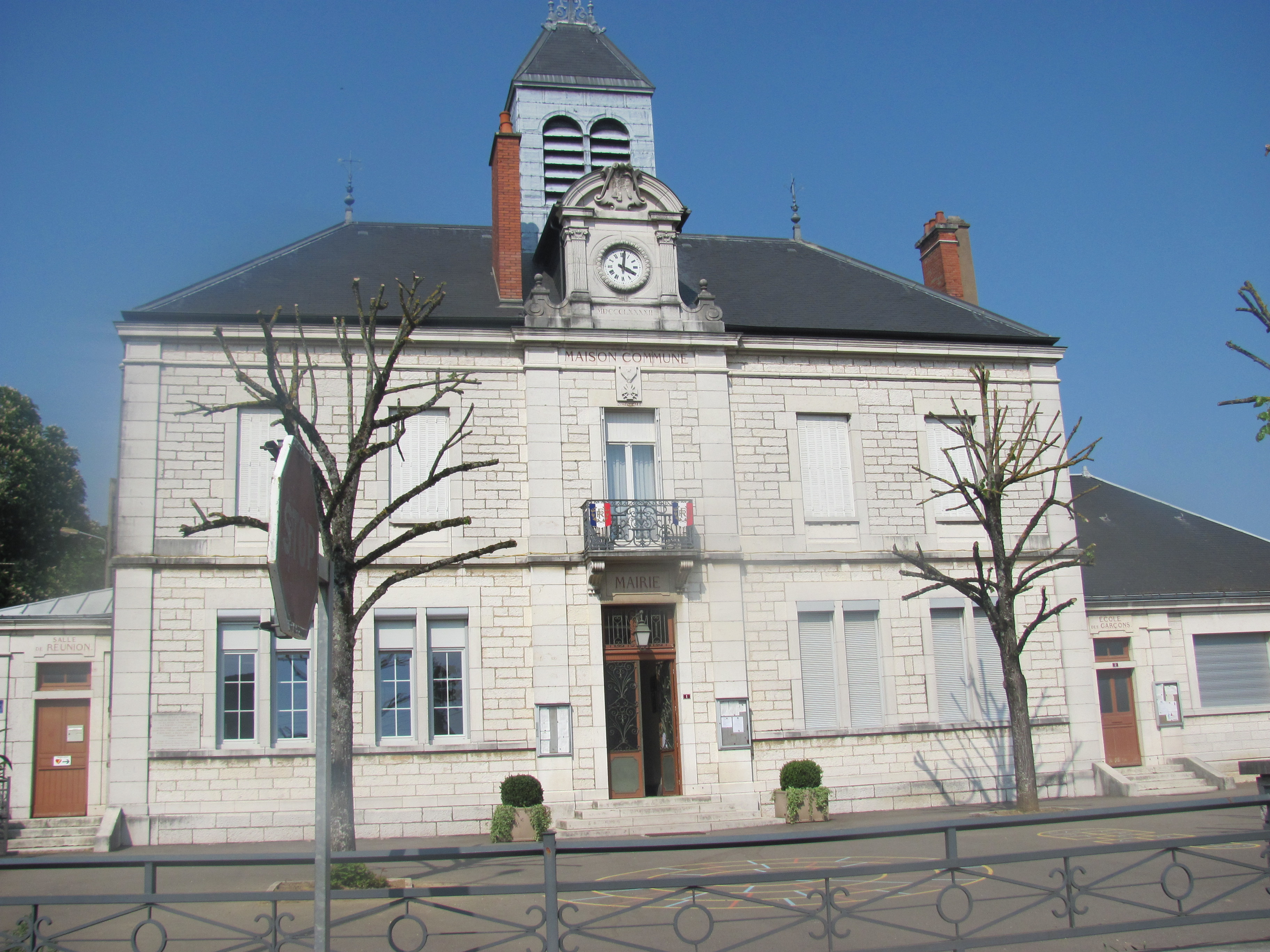
- Town hall

- Coat of arms
- Location of Comblanchien
- Location within France Location within Bourgogne-Franche-Comté
- Coordinates: 47°06′08″N 4°55′19″E
- Country: France
- Region: Bourgogne-Franche-Comté
- Department: Côte-d'Or
- Arrondissement: Beaune
- Canton: Nuits-Saint-Georges

Government
  - Mayor (2020–2026): Didier Toubin
- Area^{1}: 3.61 km^{2} (1.39 sq mi)
- Elevation: 220 m (720 ft)
- Highest elevation: 351 m (1,152 ft)
- Lowest elevation: 213 m (699 ft)
- Population (2023): 608
  - Density: 168/km^{2} (436/sq mi)
- Time zone: UTC+01:00 (CET)
  - Summer (DST): UTC+02:00 (CEST)
- INSEE/Postal code: 21186 /21700
- ^{1} French Land Register data, which excludes lakes, ponds, glaciers > 1 km^{2} (0.386 sq mi or 247 acres) and river estuaries.

Comblanchien (French pronunciation: [kɔ̃blɑ̃ʃjɛ̃]) is a commune just to the south of Nuits-Saint-Georges in the Côte-d'Or department in eastern France.

== Geology ==
Comblanchien lies in the Côte d'Or escarpment. The Jurassic limestone of the Côte includes a pink-veined marble called Pierre de Comblanchien which was laid down in the Bathonian epoch.

The stone has characteristics similar to those of marble and is notable for the variety of its shades of colour, the pink of bindweed (Convolvulus) and beige. Its veining harmonizes with any decorative style. It is not susceptible to frost damage, is fine-grained and capable of accepting a polish. It may be slippery if used polished, as a flooring. Its most notable use was in l'Opéra in Paris.

The quarries lie in the Côte overlooking Route Nationale 74, north and south of the village and similar stones are found in other places along the same vein.

== History ==
During World War II Comblanchien was severely hit by the Germans. The resistance was strong here, which led the Germans to retaliate. On 21 August 1944 much of the village was destroyed and eight people killed by Nazi forces.

== Winemaking ==
Wine produced from the vineyards surrounding Comblanchien can be labelled under the Côte de Nuits Villages appellation.

== Population ==
Historical population
Year	Pop.	±% p.a.
1968	679	—
1975	641	−0.82%
1982	572	−1.61%
1990	540	−0.72%
1999	633	+1.78%
2007	685	+0.99%
2012	684	−0.03%
2017	637	−1.41%
2023	608	−0.77%
Source: INSEE

== See also ==
- Communes of the Côte-d'Or department
