= Marey-lès-Fussey =

- Commune
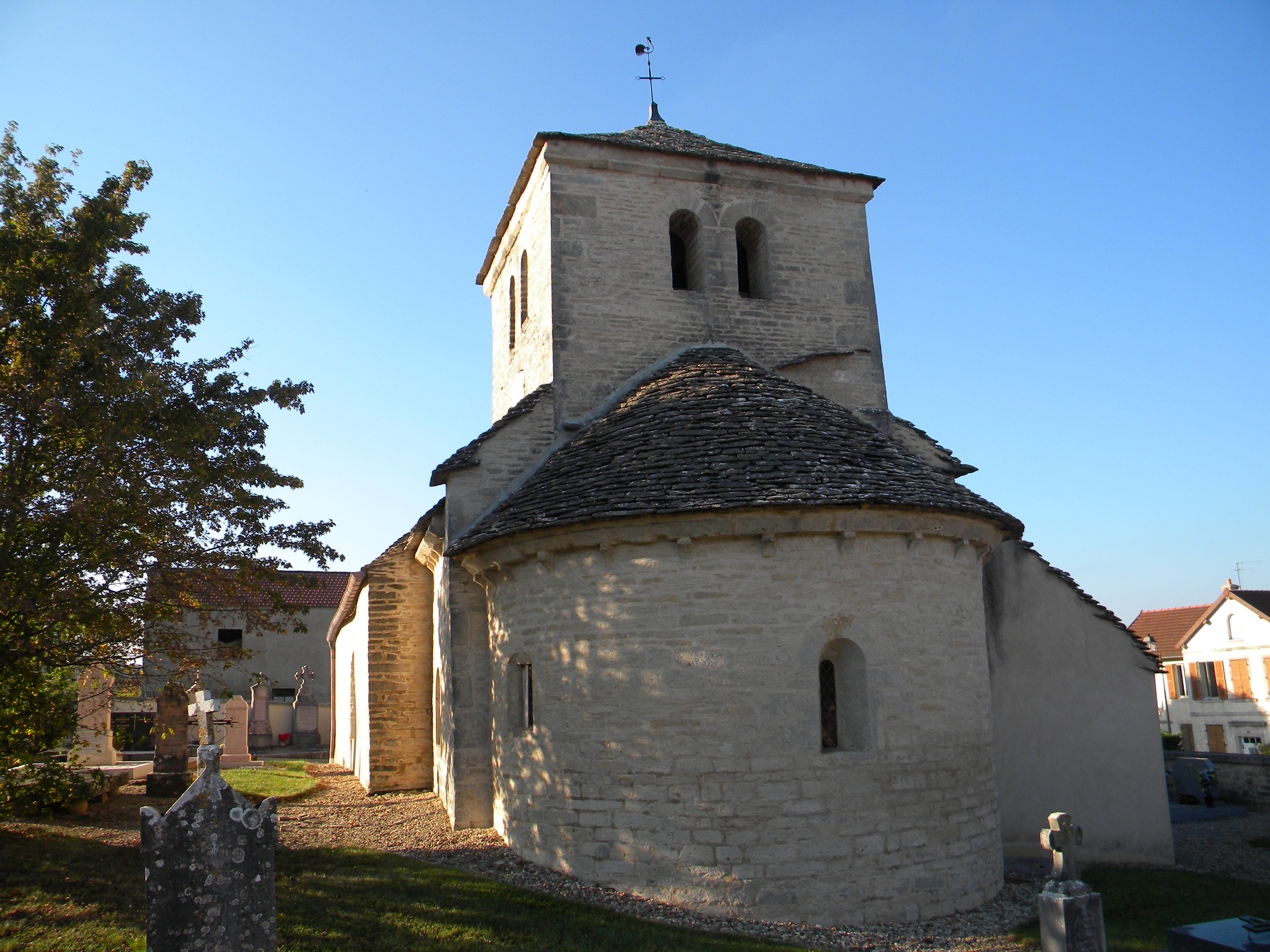
- The church in Marey-lès-Fussey

- Coat of arms
- Location of Marey-lès-Fussey
- Location within France Location within Bourgogne-Franche-Comté
- Coordinates: 47°07′13″N 4°51′31″E
- Country: France
- Region: Bourgogne-Franche-Comté
- Department: Côte-d'Or
- Arrondissement: Beaune
- Canton: Nuits-Saint-Georges

Government
  - Mayor (2020–2026): Denis Gaillot
- Area^{1}: 3.97 km^{2} (1.53 sq mi)
- Elevation: 400 m (1,300 ft)
- Highest elevation: 456 m (1,496 ft)
- Lowest elevation: 291 m (955 ft)
- Population (2023): 87
  - Density: 22/km^{2} (57/sq mi)
- Time zone: UTC+01:00 (CET)
  - Summer (DST): UTC+02:00 (CEST)
- INSEE/Postal code: 21384 /21700
- ^{1} French Land Register data, which excludes lakes, ponds, glaciers > 1 km^{2} (0.386 sq mi or 247 acres) and river estuaries.

Marey-lès-Fussey (French pronunciation: [maʁɛ lɛ fysɛ], literally Marey near Fussey) is a commune in the Côte-d'Or department in eastern France.

== Population ==
Historical population
Year	Pop.	±% p.a.
1968	59	—
1975	58	−0.24%
1982	61	+0.72%
1990	76	+2.79%
1999	81	+0.71%
2007	70	−1.81%
2012	61	−2.71%
2017	56	−1.70%
2023	87	+7.62%
Source: INSEE

== See also ==
- Communes of the Côte-d'Or department
