= Villars-Fontaine =

- Commune
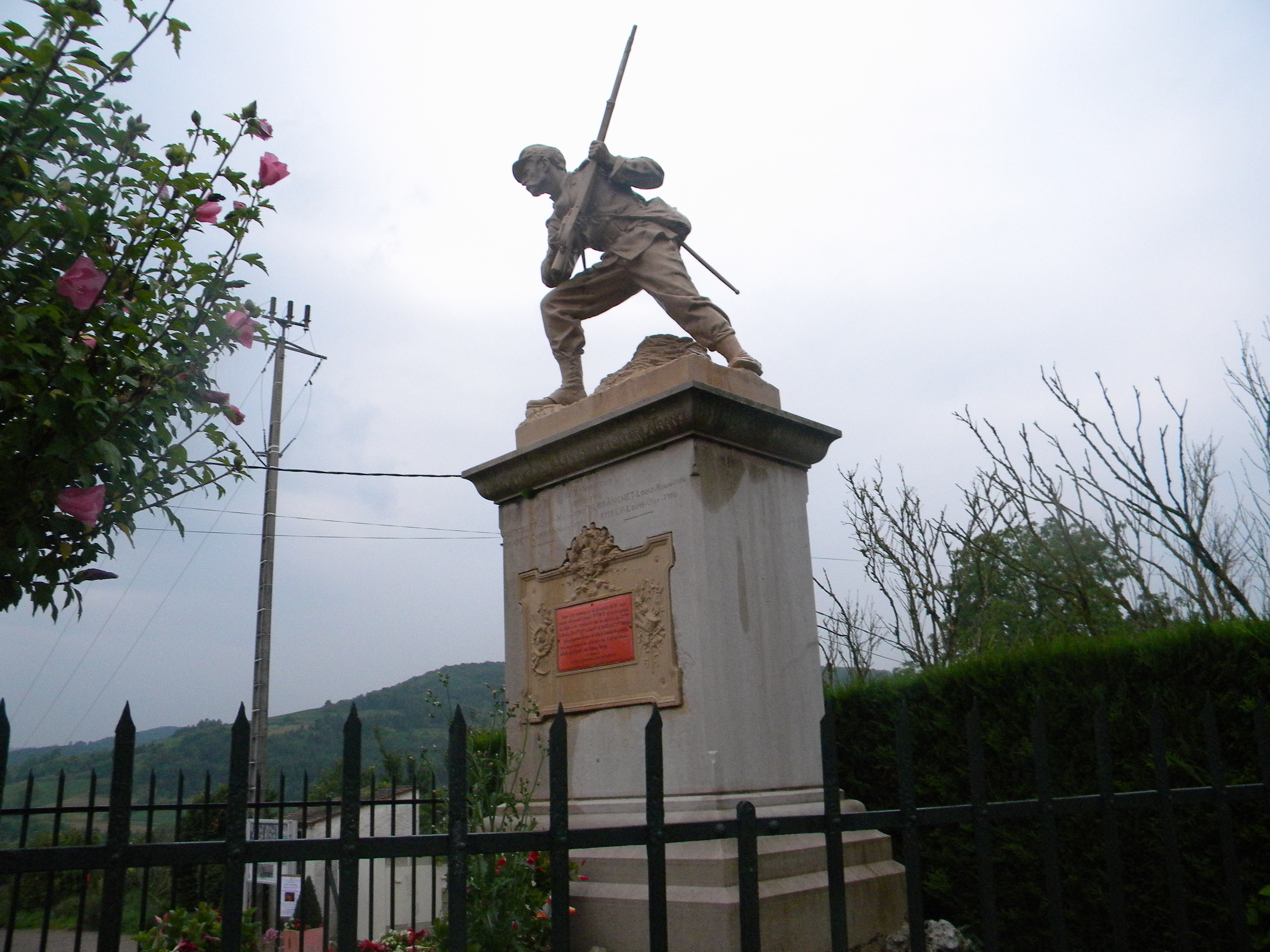
- War memorial
- Location of Villars-Fontaine
- Location within France Location within Bourgogne-Franche-Comté
- Coordinates: 47°09′00″N 4°53′32″E
- Country: France
- Region: Bourgogne-Franche-Comté
- Department: Côte-d'Or
- Arrondissement: Beaune
- Canton: Nuits-Saint-Georges

Government
  - Mayor (2020–2026): Pierre Lignier
- Area^{1}: 2.89 km^{2} (1.12 sq mi)
- Elevation: 318 m (1,043 ft)
- Highest elevation: 489 m (1,604 ft)
- Lowest elevation: 265 m (869 ft)
- Population (2023): 116
  - Density: 40.1/km^{2} (104/sq mi)
- Time zone: UTC+01:00 (CET)
  - Summer (DST): UTC+02:00 (CEST)
- INSEE/Postal code: 21688 /21700
- ^{1} French Land Register data, which excludes lakes, ponds, glaciers > 1 km^{2} (0.386 sq mi or 247 acres) and river estuaries.

Villars-Fontaine (French pronunciation: [vilaʁ fɔ̃tɛn]) is a commune in the Côte-d'Or department in eastern France.

== Population ==
Historical population
Year	Pop.	±% p.a.
1968	93	—
1975	98	+0.75%
1982	112	+1.93%
1990	117	+0.55%
1999	110	−0.68%
2007	131	+2.21%
2012	121	−1.58%
2017	118	−0.50%
2023	116	−0.28%
Source: INSEE

== See also ==
- Communes of the Côte-d'Or department
