= Agencourt =

- Commune
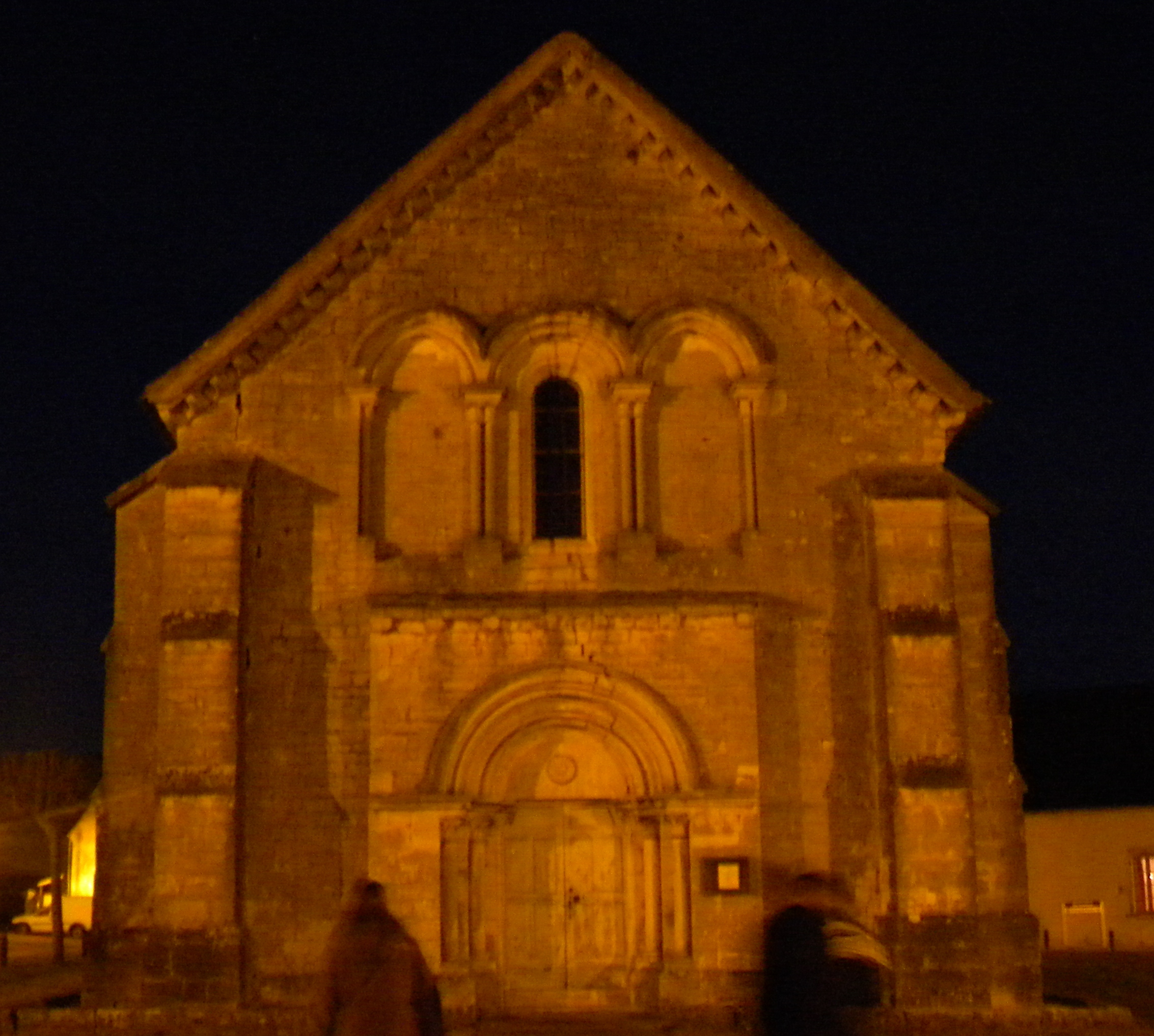
- Agencourt Church

- Coat of arms
- Location of Agencourt
- Location within France Location within Bourgogne-Franche-Comté
- Coordinates: 47°07′44″N 4°58′54″E
- Country: France
- Region: Bourgogne-Franche-Comté
- Department: Côte-d'Or
- Arrondissement: Beaune
- Canton: Nuits-Saint-Georges
- Intercommunality: Gevrey-Chambertin et Nuits-Saint-Georges

Government
  - Mayor (2020–2026): Gilles Seguin
- Area^{1}: 4.2 km^{2} (1.6 sq mi)
- Elevation: 228 m (748 ft)
- Highest elevation: 237 m (778 ft)
- Lowest elevation: 209 m (686 ft)
- Population (2023): 416
  - Density: 99/km^{2} (260/sq mi)
- Time zone: UTC+01:00 (CET)
  - Summer (DST): UTC+02:00 (CEST)
- INSEE/Postal code: 21001 /21700
- ^{1} French Land Register data, which excludes lakes, ponds, glaciers > 1 km^{2} (0.386 sq mi or 247 acres) and river estuaries.

Agencourt (French pronunciation: [aʒɑ̃kuʁ]) is a commune in the Côte-d'Or department in the Bourgogne-Franche-Comté region of eastern France.

== Geography ==
Agencourt is located some 20 km south of Dijon on the A31 autoroute (E17) with Exit 1 in the commune. The motorway forms the western border of the commune with Nuits-Saint-Georges on the opposite side of the motorway. Access to the commune is on the D8 road (Rue du Village) from west to east from Nuits-Saint-Georges which continues east to Saint-Nicolas-les-Citeaux. Agencourt town is spread along the Highway D8 and is the only built-up area in the commune which consists entirely of farmland except for the Bois de Charbonniere on the eastern side of the commune.

== Heraldry ==
Arms of Agencourt	Blazon: Vairé, of four rows tierced per pale in gules charged with pales of Or and surcharged by a clocheton of two bells of Argent masoned in sable.

== Administration ==
List of Successive Mayors of Agencourt

From	To	Name
2001	2008	Jean Detain
2008	2014	Alain Courteaux
2014	2026	Gilles Seguin

== Population ==
The inhabitants of the commune are known as Agencourtois or Agencourtoises in French.

Historical population

Year	Pop.	±% p.a.
1793	150	—
1821	167	+0.38%
1846	173	+0.14%
1872	202	+0.60%
1901	300	+1.37%
1926	232	−1.02%
1946	224	−0.18%
1962	181	−1.32%
1968	183	+0.18%

Year	Pop.	±% p.a.
1975	236	+3.70%
1982	268	+1.83%
1990	361	+3.79%
1999	422	+1.75%
2007	395	−0.82%
2012	433	+1.85%
2017	460	+1.22%
2023	416	−1.66%

Source: EHESS and INSEE

== Culture and heritage ==
=== Civil heritage ===
The commune has one building that is registered as an historical monument:

- Agencourt Fortified House (1643) with the remains of a moat: the main building from the 17th century, stables from 1643.

=== Religious heritage ===
The commune has one religious building that is registered as an historical monument:

- The Parish Church of Notre-Dame (12th century). The Church contains many items that are registered as historical objects:
  - A Monumental Painting: Cherubs (17th century)
  - A Monumental Painting: Centaur (16th century)
  - A Consecrational Cross (14th century)
  - A Monumental Painting: Education of the Virgin and St. Margaret (15th century)
  - A Monumental Painting: Saint Georges (16th century)
  - A Monumental Painting: Saint Michel and Saint Blaise (15th century)
- The Parish Church of the Assumption contains one item that is registered as an historical object:
  - A Heraldic Stained glass window for the Vichy family (1500)

== See also ==
- Communes of the Côte-d'Or department
