= Gilly-lès-Cîteaux =

- Commune
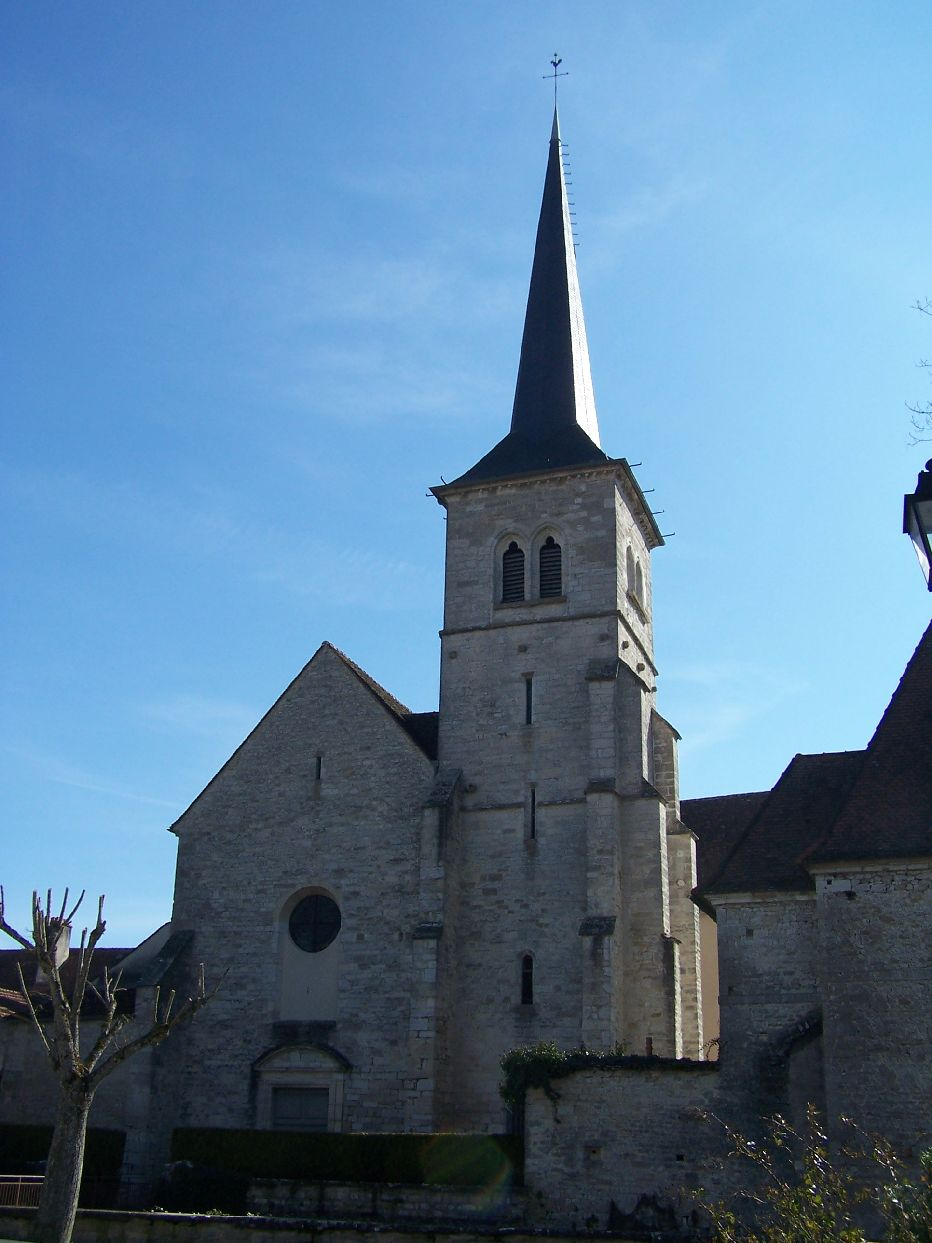
- The church in Gilly-lès-Cîteaux

- Coat of arms
- Location of Gilly-lès-Cîteaux
- Location within France Location within Bourgogne-Franche-Comté
- Coordinates: 47°10′25″N 4°58′52″E
- Country: France
- Region: Bourgogne-Franche-Comté
- Department: Côte-d'Or
- Arrondissement: Beaune
- Canton: Nuits-Saint-Georges

Government
  - Mayor (2020–2026): Didier Danel
- Area^{1}: 11.03 km^{2} (4.26 sq mi)
- Elevation: 240 m (790 ft)
- Highest elevation: 254 m (833 ft)
- Lowest elevation: 206 m (676 ft)
- Population (2023): 727
  - Density: 65.9/km^{2} (171/sq mi)
- Time zone: UTC+01:00 (CET)
  - Summer (DST): UTC+02:00 (CEST)
- INSEE/Postal code: 21297 /21640
- ^{1} French Land Register data, which excludes lakes, ponds, glaciers > 1 km^{2} (0.386 sq mi or 247 acres) and river estuaries.

Gilly-lès-Cîteaux (French pronunciation: [ʒiji lɛ sito]) is a commune in the Côte-d'Or department in eastern France.

== Population ==
Historical population
Year	Pop.	±% p.a.
1968	403	—
1975	415	+0.42%
1982	461	+1.51%
1990	517	+1.44%
1999	567	+1.03%
2007	599	+0.69%
2012	646	+1.52%
2017	705	+1.76%
2023	727	+0.51%
Source: INSEE

== See also ==
- Communes of the Côte-d'Or department
