= Savouges =

- Commune
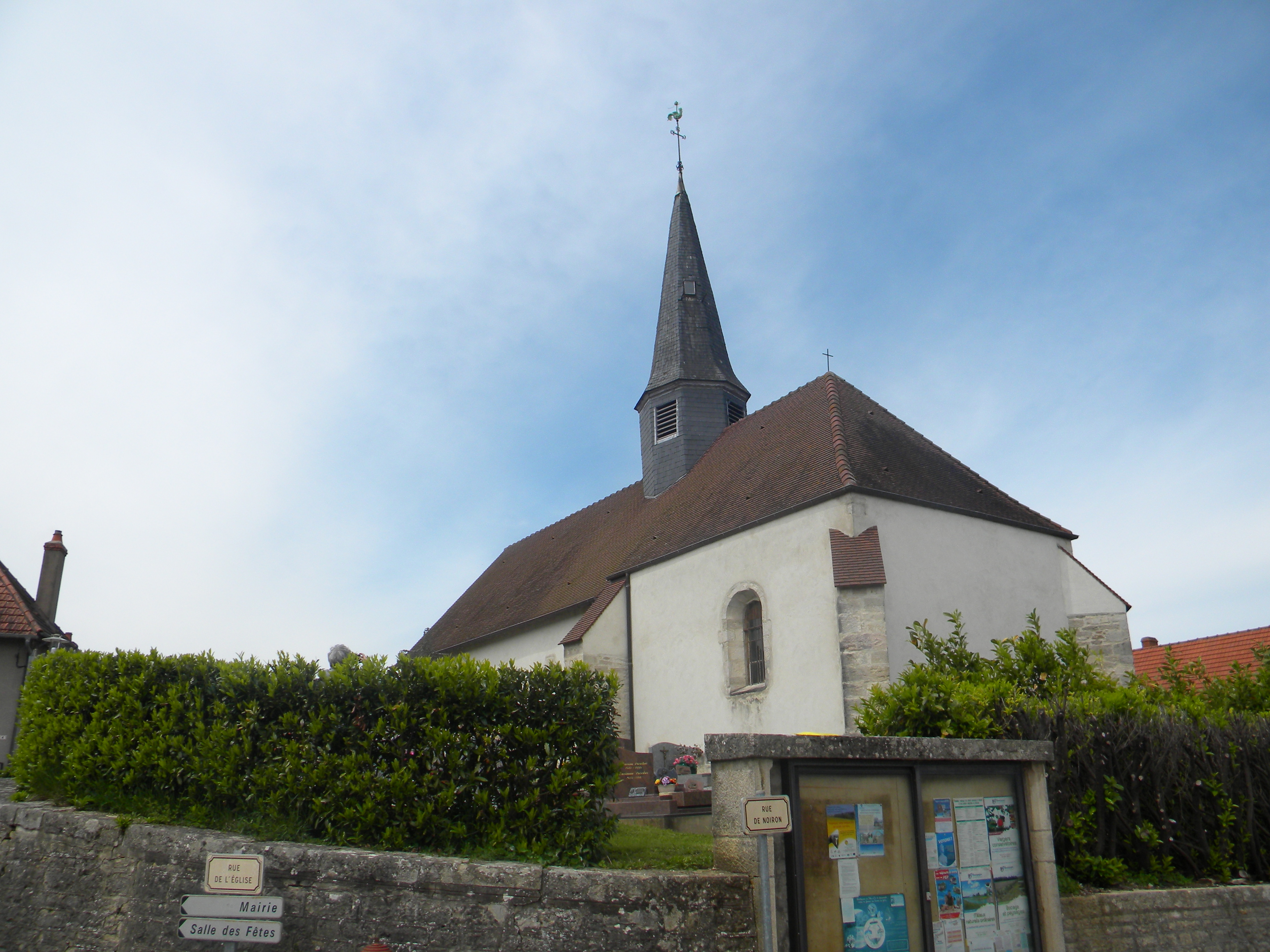
- The church in Savouges

- Coat of arms
- Location of Savouges
- Location within France Location within Bourgogne-Franche-Comté
- Coordinates: 47°11′05″N 5°03′43″E
- Country: France
- Region: Bourgogne-Franche-Comté
- Department: Côte-d'Or
- Arrondissement: Beaune
- Canton: Nuits-Saint-Georges

Government
  - Mayor (2020–2026): Sylvie Ventard
- Area^{1}: 3.09 km^{2} (1.19 sq mi)
- Highest elevation: 232 m (761 ft)
- Lowest elevation: 202 m (663 ft)
- Population (2023): 370
  - Density: 120/km^{2} (310/sq mi)
- Time zone: UTC+01:00 (CET)
  - Summer (DST): UTC+02:00 (CEST)
- INSEE/Postal code: 21596 /21910
- ^{1} French Land Register data, which excludes lakes, ponds, glaciers > 1 km^{2} (0.386 sq mi or 247 acres) and river estuaries.

Savouges (French pronunciation: [savuʒ]) is a commune in the Côte-d'Or department in eastern France.

== Population ==
Historical population
Year	Pop.	±% p.a.
1968	47	—
1975	60	+3.55%
1982	92	+6.30%
1990	153	+6.56%
1999	183	+2.01%
2007	351	+8.48%
2012	382	+1.71%
2017	376	−0.32%
2023	370	−0.27%
Source: INSEE

== See also ==
- Communes of the Côte-d'Or department
