= Villy-le-Moutier =

- Commune
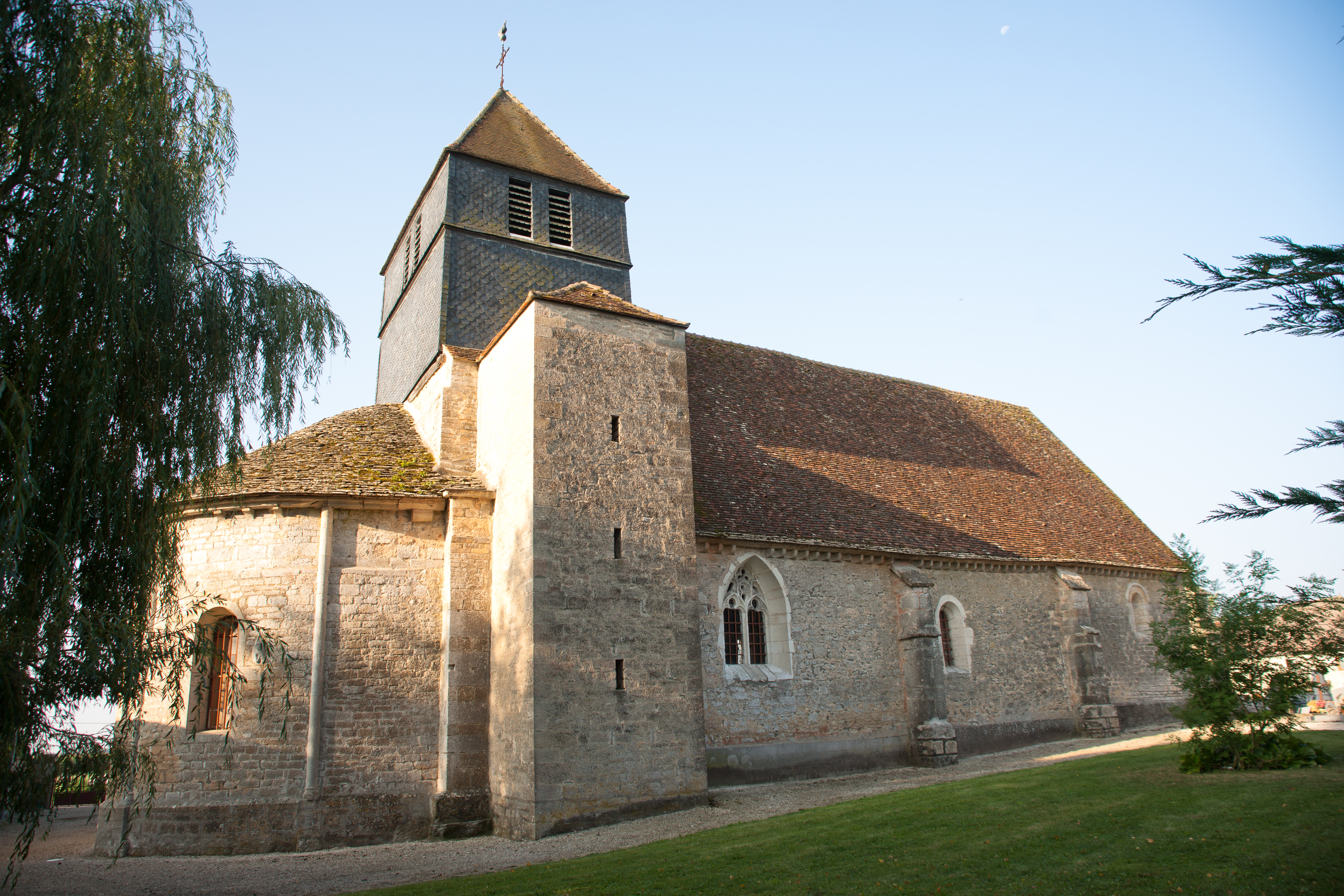
- The church in Villy-le-Moutier

- Coat of arms
- Location of Villy-le-Moutier
- Location within France Location within Bourgogne-Franche-Comté
- Coordinates: 47°02′18″N 4°59′36″E
- Country: France
- Region: Bourgogne-Franche-Comté
- Department: Côte-d'Or
- Arrondissement: Beaune
- Canton: Nuits-Saint-Georges

Government
  - Mayor (2020–2026): Marcel Jobard
- Area^{1}: 20.13 km^{2} (7.77 sq mi)
- Elevation: 188 m (617 ft)
- Highest elevation: 211 m (692 ft)
- Lowest elevation: 183 m (600 ft)
- Population (2023): 337
  - Density: 16.7/km^{2} (43.4/sq mi)
- Time zone: UTC+01:00 (CET)
  - Summer (DST): UTC+02:00 (CEST)
- INSEE/Postal code: 21708 /21250
- ^{1} French Land Register data, which excludes lakes, ponds, glaciers > 1 km^{2} (0.386 sq mi or 247 acres) and river estuaries.

Villy-le-Moutier is a commune in the Côte-d'Or department in eastern France.

== Population ==
Historical population
Year	Pop.	±% p.a.
1968	195	—
1975	175	−1.53%
1982	165	−0.84%
1990	191	+1.85%
1999	216	+1.38%
2007	317	+4.91%
2012	347	+1.82%
2017	339	−0.47%
2023	337	−0.10%
Source: INSEE

== See also ==
- Communes of the Côte-d'Or department
