= Canton of Nuits-Saint-Georges =

Canton of Côte-d'Or, France

Coordinates: 47.14°N 4.95°E

The canton of Nuits-Saint-Georges is an administrative division of the Côte-d'Or department, eastern France. Its borders were modified at the French canton reorganisation which came into effect in March 2015. Its seat is in Nuits-Saint-Georges.

It consists of the following communes:

1. Agencourt
2. Arcenant
3. Argilly
4. Barges
5. Boncourt-le-Bois
6. Broindon
7. Chaux
8. Comblanchien
9. Corcelles-lès-Cîteaux
10. Corgoloin
11. Épernay-sous-Gevrey
12. Flagey-Echézeaux
13. Fussey
14. Gerland
15. Gilly-lès-Cîteaux
16. Magny-lès-Villers
17. Marey-lès-Fussey
18. Meuilley
19. Noiron-sous-Gevrey
20. Nuits-Saint-Georges
21. Premeaux-Prissey
22. Quincey
23. Saint-Bernard
24. Saint-Nicolas-lès-Cîteaux
25. Saint-Philibert
26. Saulon-la-Chapelle
27. Saulon-la-Rue
28. Savouges
29. Villars-Fontaine
30. Villebichot
31. Villers-la-Faye
32. Villy-le-Moutier
33. Vosne-Romanée
34. Vougeot
