= Gerland, Côte-d'Or =

Gerland
- Commune
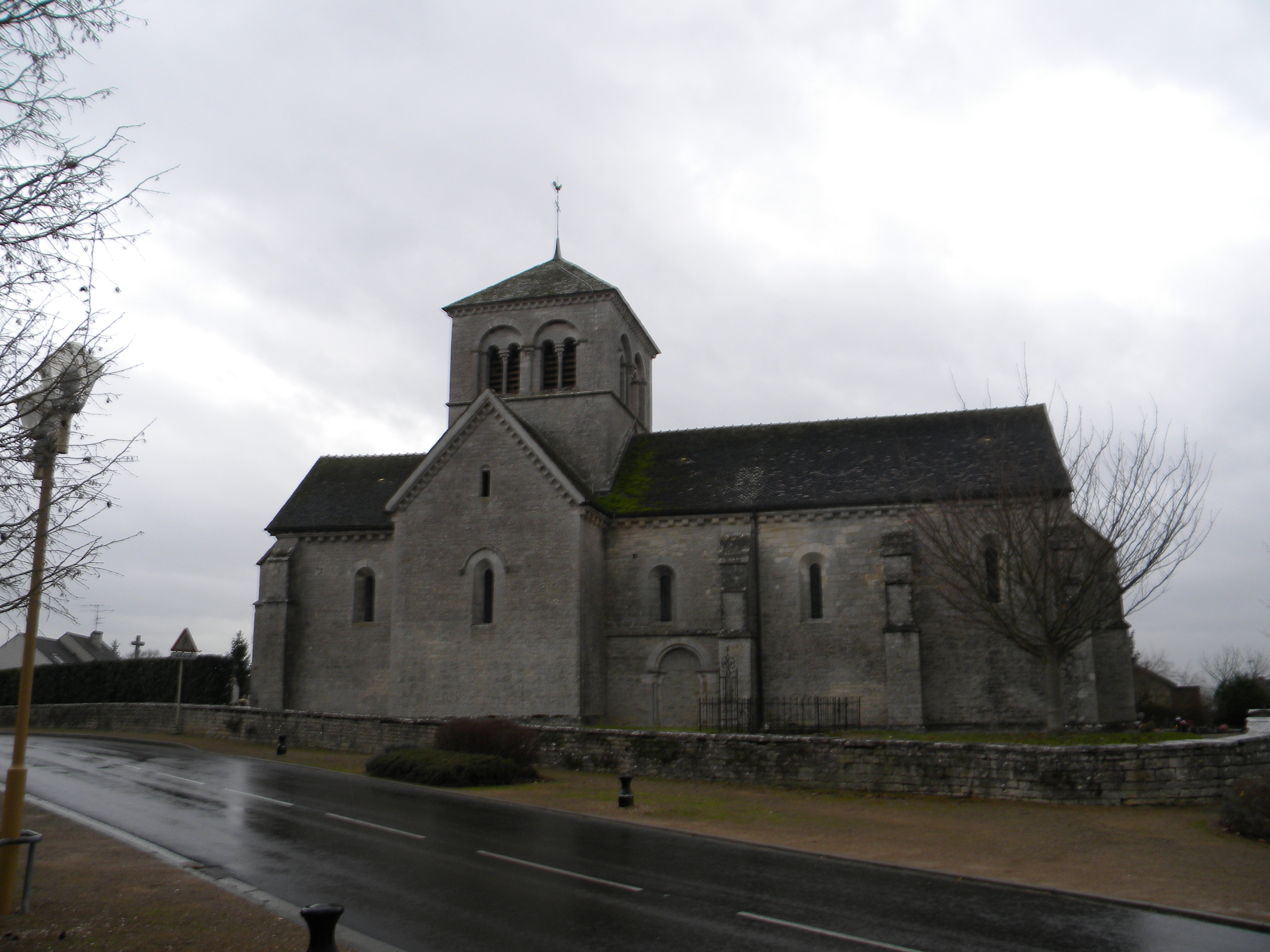
- The church in Gerland
- Location of Gerland
- Location within France Location within Bourgogne-Franche-Comté
- Coordinates: 47°05′42″N 5°00′26″E
- Country: France
- Region: Bourgogne-Franche-Comté
- Department: Côte-d'Or
- Arrondissement: Beaune
- Canton: Nuits-Saint-Georges

Government
  - Mayor (2020–2026): Francis Chenot
- Area^{1}: 20.68 km^{2} (7.98 sq mi)
- Elevation: 217 m (712 ft)
- Highest elevation: 227 m (745 ft)
- Lowest elevation: 199 m (653 ft)
- Population (2023): 443
  - Density: 21.4/km^{2} (55.5/sq mi)
- Time zone: UTC+01:00 (CET)
  - Summer (DST): UTC+02:00 (CEST)
- INSEE/Postal code: 21294 /21700
- ^{1} French Land Register data, which excludes lakes, ponds, glaciers > 1 km^{2} (0.386 sq mi or 247 acres) and river estuaries.

Gerland (French pronunciation: [ʒɛʁlɑ̃]) is a commune in the Côte-d'Or department in eastern France.

== Population ==
Historical population
Year	Pop.	±% p.a.
1968	201	—
1975	211	+0.70%
1982	275	+3.86%
1990	322	+1.99%
1999	355	+1.09%
2007	405	+1.66%
2012	414	+0.44%
2017	431	+0.81%
2023	443	+0.46%
Source: INSEE

== See also ==
- Communes of the Côte-d'Or department
