= Villers-la-Faye =

- Commune
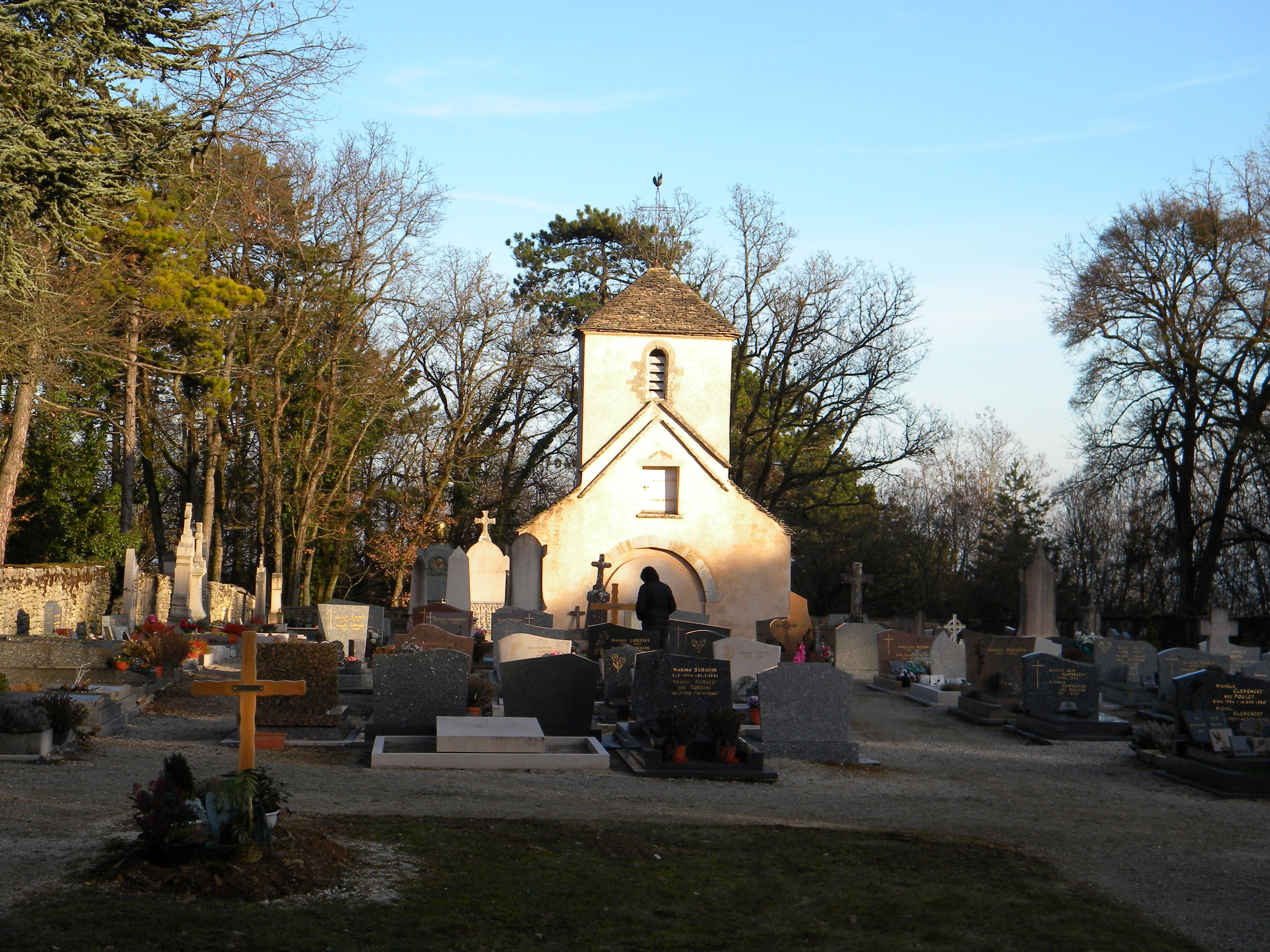
- The church in Villers-la-Faye

- Coat of arms
- Location of Villers-la-Faye
- Location within France Location within Bourgogne-Franche-Comté
- Coordinates: 47°06′23″N 4°52′43″E
- Country: France
- Region: Bourgogne-Franche-Comté
- Department: Côte-d'Or
- Arrondissement: Beaune
- Canton: Nuits-Saint-Georges

Government
  - Mayor (2020–2026): Isabelle Chapuilliot-Cattier
- Area^{1}: 5.84 km^{2} (2.25 sq mi)
- Elevation: 356 m (1,168 ft)
- Highest elevation: 431 m (1,414 ft)
- Lowest elevation: 265 m (869 ft)
- Population (2023): 405
  - Density: 69.3/km^{2} (180/sq mi)
- Time zone: UTC+01:00 (CET)
  - Summer (DST): UTC+02:00 (CEST)
- INSEE/Postal code: 21698 /21700
- ^{1} French Land Register data, which excludes lakes, ponds, glaciers > 1 km^{2} (0.386 sq mi or 247 acres) and river estuaries.

Villers-la-Faye (French pronunciation: [vilɛʁ la fɛ]) is a commune in the Côte-d'Or department in eastern France.

== Population ==
Historical population
Year	Pop.	±% p.a.
1968	271	—
1975	266	−0.27%
1982	315	+2.44%
1990	386	+2.57%
1999	406	+0.56%
2007	401	−0.15%
2012	404	+0.15%
2017	392	−0.60%
2023	405	+0.55%
Source: INSEE

== See also ==
- Communes of the Côte-d'Or department
