= Broindon =

- Commune
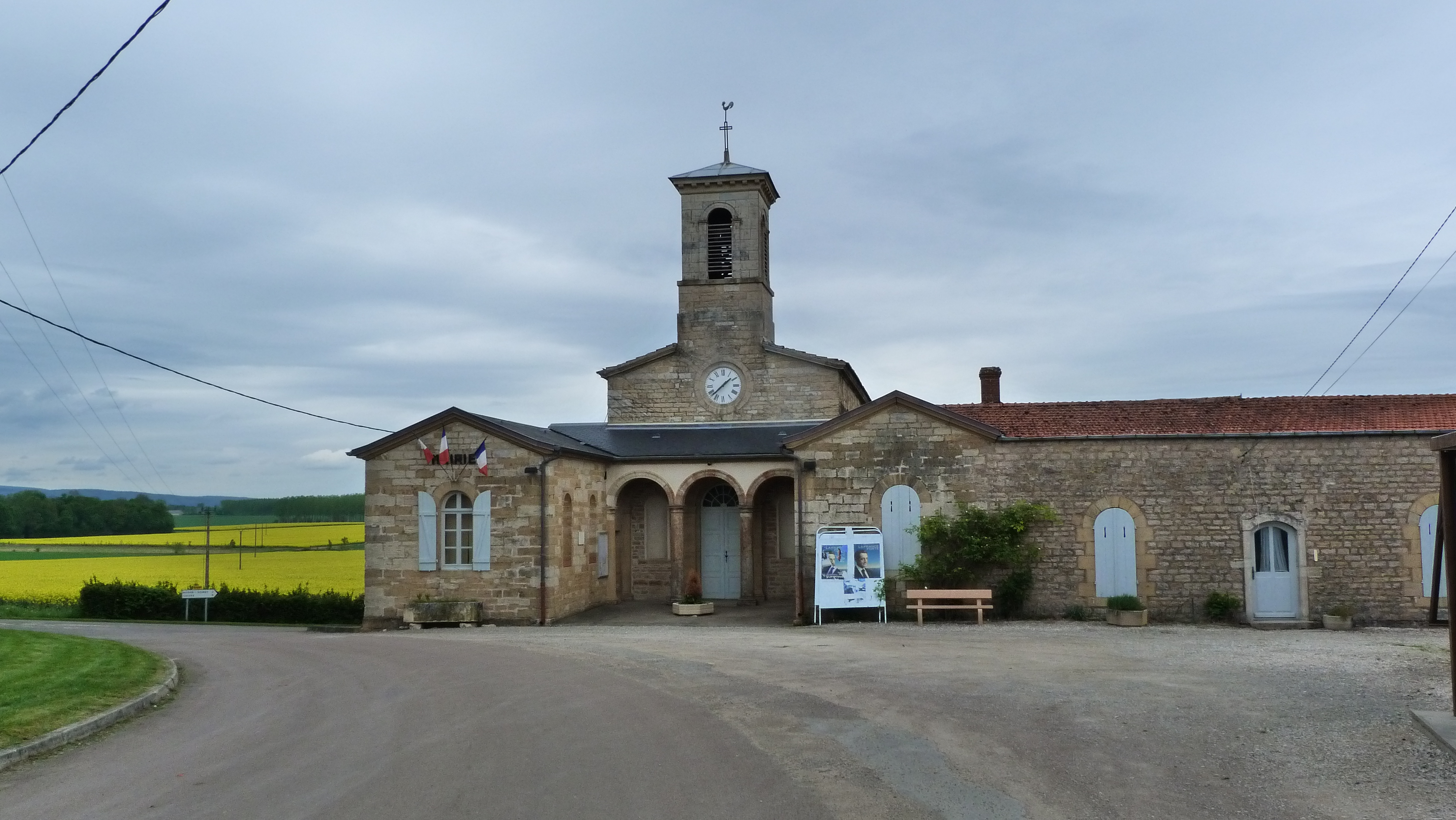
- Town hall

- Coat of arms
- Location of Broindon
- Location within France Location within Bourgogne-Franche-Comté
- Coordinates: 47°11′54″N 5°02′43″E
- Country: France
- Region: Bourgogne-Franche-Comté
- Department: Côte-d'Or
- Arrondissement: Beaune
- Canton: Nuits-Saint-Georges

Government
  - Mayor (2020–2026): Alain Vion
- Area^{1}: 4.64 km^{2} (1.79 sq mi)
- Highest elevation: 226 m (741 ft)
- Lowest elevation: 206 m (676 ft)
- Population (2023): 203
  - Density: 43.7/km^{2} (113/sq mi)
- Time zone: UTC+01:00 (CET)
  - Summer (DST): UTC+02:00 (CEST)
- INSEE/Postal code: 21113 /21220
- ^{1} French Land Register data, which excludes lakes, ponds, glaciers > 1 km^{2} (0.386 sq mi or 247 acres) and river estuaries.

Broindon (French pronunciation: [bʁwɛ̃dɔ̃]) is a commune in the Côte-d'Or department in eastern France.

== Population ==
Historical population
Year	Pop.	±% p.a.
1968	41	—
1975	42	+0.34%
1982	62	+5.72%
1990	71	+1.71%
1999	61	−1.67%
2007	75	+2.62%
2012	142	+13.62%
2017	207	+7.83%
2023	203	−0.32%
Source: INSEE

== See also ==
- Communes of the Côte-d'Or department
