= Saint-Bernard, Côte-d'Or =

Saint-Bernard
- Commune
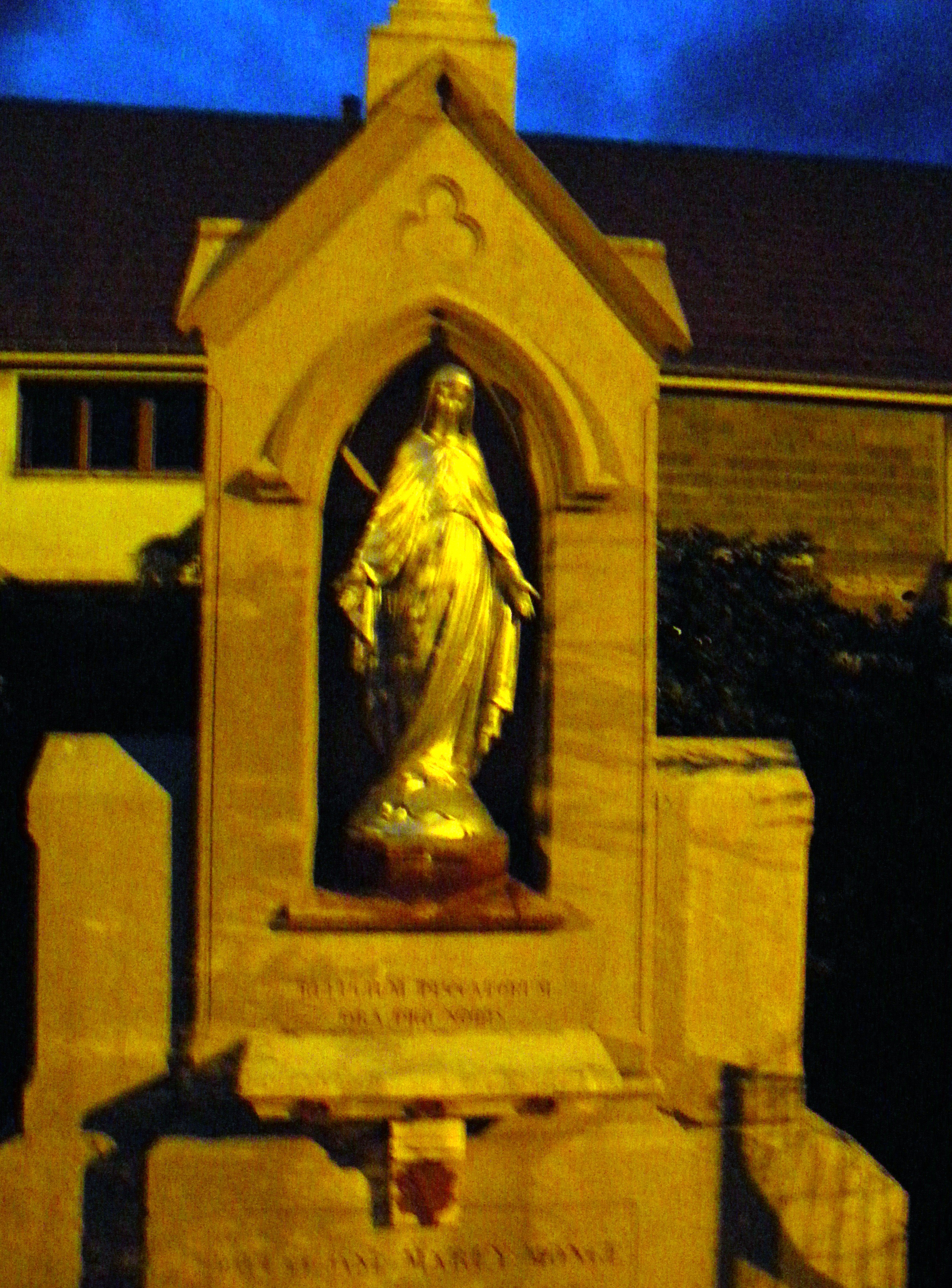
- The statue of the Virgin in Saint-Bernard

- Coat of arms
- Location of Saint-Bernard
- Location within France Location within Bourgogne-Franche-Comté
- Coordinates: 47°09′27″N 5°01′03″E
- Country: France
- Region: Bourgogne-Franche-Comté
- Department: Côte-d'Or
- Arrondissement: Beaune
- Canton: Nuits-Saint-Georges

Government
  - Mayor (2020–2026): Jean-Claude Gaillard
- Area^{1}: 3.69 km^{2} (1.42 sq mi)
- Elevation: 233 m (764 ft)
- Highest elevation: 227 m (745 ft)
- Lowest elevation: 202 m (663 ft)
- Population (2023): 464
  - Density: 126/km^{2} (326/sq mi)
- Time zone: UTC+01:00 (CET)
  - Summer (DST): UTC+02:00 (CEST)
- INSEE/Postal code: 21542 /21700
- ^{1} French Land Register data, which excludes lakes, ponds, glaciers > 1 km^{2} (0.386 sq mi or 247 acres) and river estuaries.

Saint-Bernard (French pronunciation: [sɛ̃ bɛʁnaʁ]) is a commune in the Côte-d'Or department in eastern France.

== Population ==
Historical population
Year	Pop.	±% p.a.
1968	87	—
1975	109	+3.27%
1982	194	+8.58%
1990	236	+2.48%
1999	291	+2.35%
2007	367	+2.94%
2012	484	+5.69%
2017	453	−1.32%
2023	464	+0.40%
Source: INSEE

== See also ==
- Communes of the Côte-d'Or department
