= Corgoloin =

- Commune
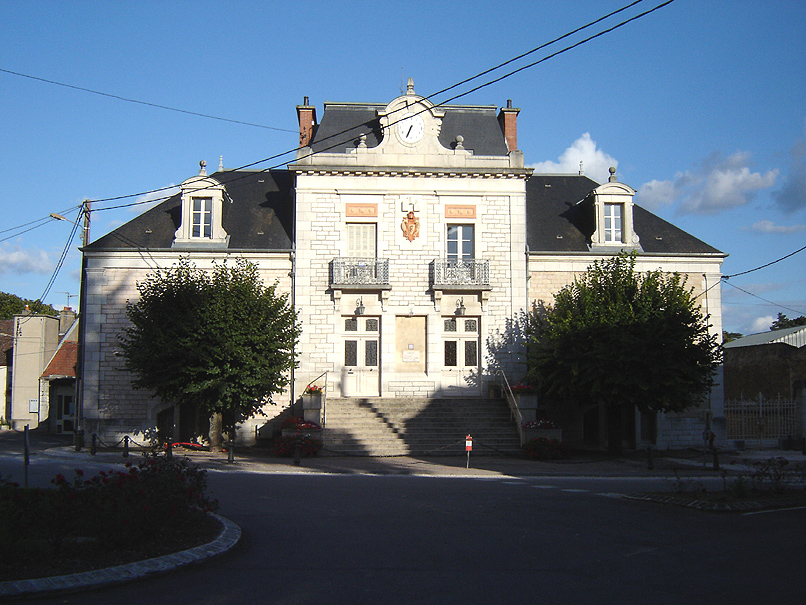
- Old town hall

- Coat of arms
- Location of Corgoloin
- Location within France Location within Bourgogne-Franche-Comté
- Coordinates: 47°05′05″N 4°54′55″E
- Country: France
- Region: Bourgogne-Franche-Comté
- Department: Côte-d'Or
- Arrondissement: Beaune
- Canton: Nuits-Saint-Georges

Government
  - Mayor (2020–2026): Dominique Véret
- Area^{1}: 12.58 km^{2} (4.86 sq mi)
- Elevation: 226 m (741 ft)
- Highest elevation: 322 m (1,056 ft)
- Lowest elevation: 198 m (650 ft)
- Population (2023): 982
  - Density: 78.1/km^{2} (202/sq mi)
- Time zone: UTC+01:00 (CET)
  - Summer (DST): UTC+02:00 (CEST)
- INSEE/Postal code: 21194 /21700
- ^{1} French Land Register data, which excludes lakes, ponds, glaciers > 1 km^{2} (0.386 sq mi or 247 acres) and river estuaries.

Corgoloin (French pronunciation: [kɔʁɡɔlwɛ̃]) is a commune in the Côte-d'Or department in eastern France.

== Population ==
Historical population
Year	Pop.	±% p.a.
1968	977	—
1975	951	−0.38%
1982	854	−1.53%
1990	893	+0.56%
1999	900	+0.09%
2007	958	+0.78%
2012	894	−1.37%
2017	906	+0.27%
2023	982	+1.35%
Source: INSEE

== See also ==
- Communes of the Côte-d'Or department
