= Fussey =

- Commune
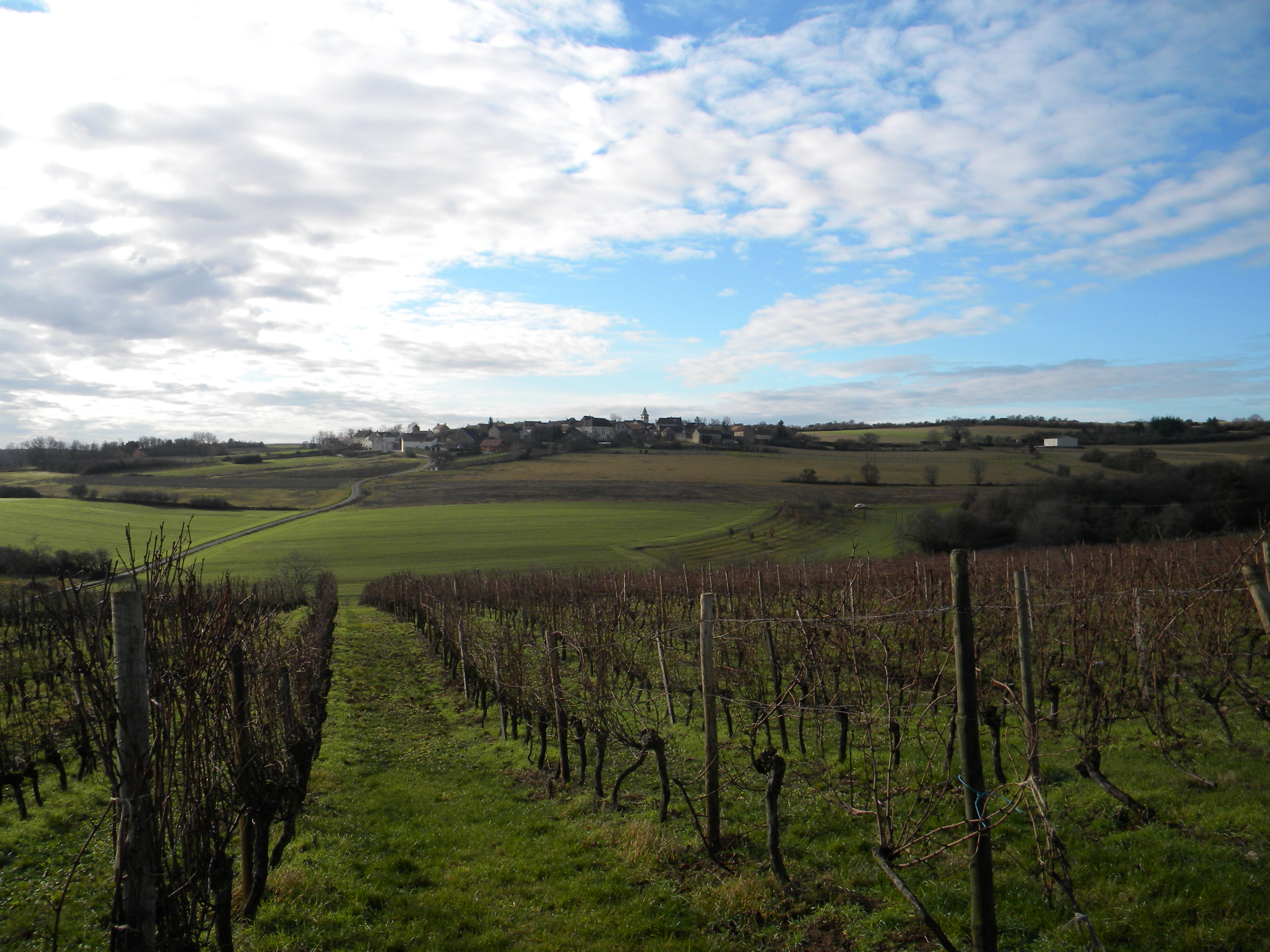
- A general view of Fussey

- Coat of arms
- Location of Fussey
- Location within France Location within Bourgogne-Franche-Comté
- Coordinates: 47°07′11″N 4°50′12″E
- Country: France
- Region: Bourgogne-Franche-Comté
- Department: Côte-d'Or
- Arrondissement: Beaune
- Canton: Nuits-Saint-Georges

Government
  - Mayor (2020–2026): Philippe Rouard
- Area^{1}: 7.73 km^{2} (2.98 sq mi)
- Elevation: 478 m (1,568 ft)
- Highest elevation: 607 m (1,991 ft)
- Lowest elevation: 390 m (1,280 ft)
- Population (2023): 125
  - Density: 16.2/km^{2} (41.9/sq mi)
- Time zone: UTC+01:00 (CET)
  - Summer (DST): UTC+02:00 (CEST)
- INSEE/Postal code: 21289 /21700
- ^{1} French Land Register data, which excludes lakes, ponds, glaciers > 1 km^{2} (0.386 sq mi or 247 acres) and river estuaries.

Fussey (French pronunciation: [fysɛ]) is a commune in the Côte-d'Or department in eastern France. The estimated population as of 2021 is 119.

== Population ==
Historical population
Year	Pop.	±% p.a.
1968	100	—
1975	80	−3.14%
1982	73	−1.30%
1990	84	+1.77%
1999	98	+1.73%
2007	106	+0.99%
2012	116	+1.82%
2017	118	+0.34%
2023	125	+0.97%
Source: INSEE

== See also ==
- Communes of the Côte-d'Or department
