= Saulon-la-Rue =

- Commune
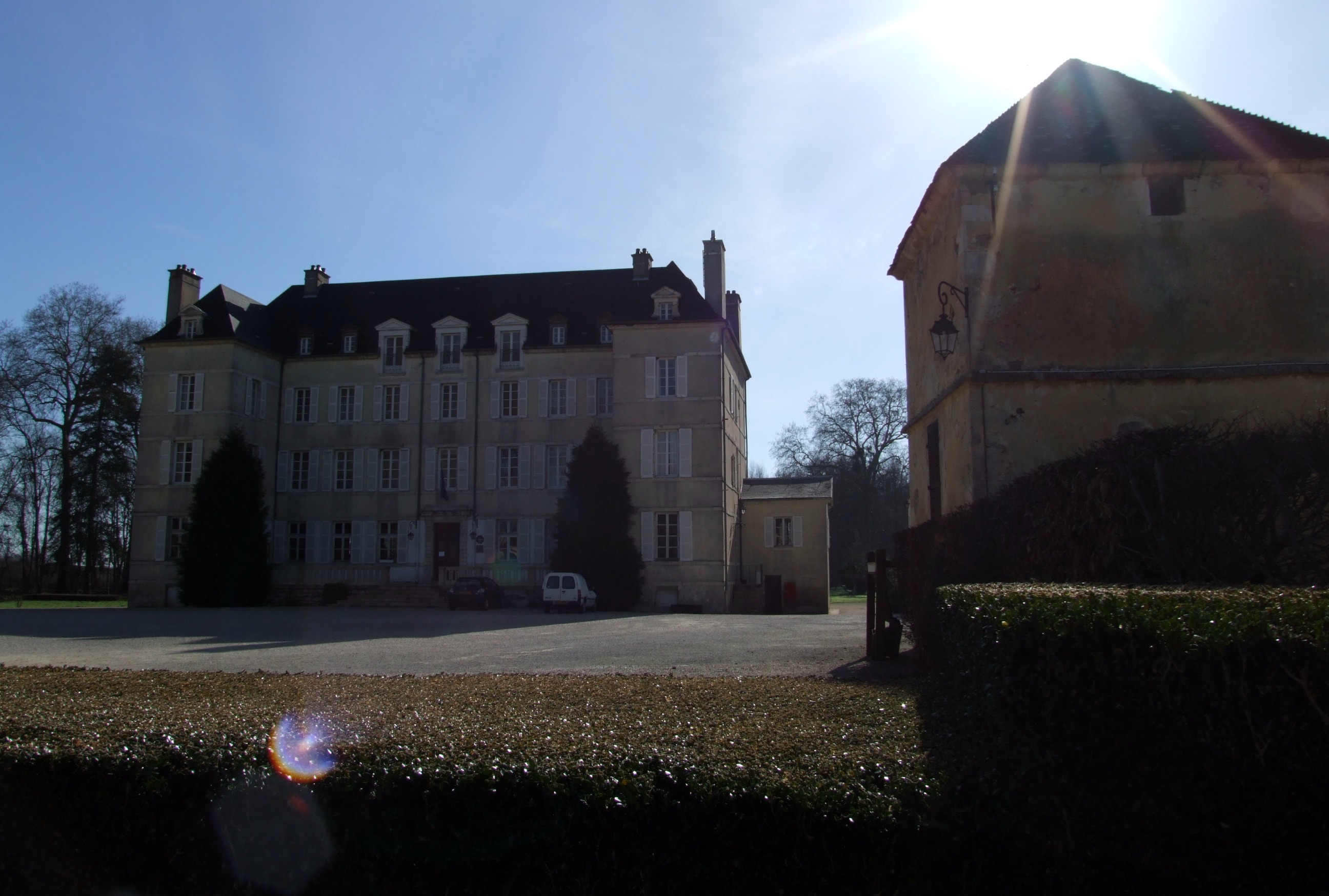
- Chateau

- Coat of arms
- Location of Saulon-la-Rue
- Location within France Location within Bourgogne-Franche-Comté
- Coordinates: 47°13′21″N 5°03′52″E
- Country: France
- Region: Bourgogne-Franche-Comté
- Department: Côte-d'Or
- Arrondissement: Beaune
- Canton: Nuits-Saint-Georges

Government
  - Mayor (2020–2026): Alexandre Garneret
- Area^{1}: 4.53 km^{2} (1.75 sq mi)
- Highest elevation: 233 m (764 ft)
- Lowest elevation: 211 m (692 ft)
- Population (2023): 701
  - Density: 155/km^{2} (401/sq mi)
- Time zone: UTC+01:00 (CET)
  - Summer (DST): UTC+02:00 (CEST)
- INSEE/Postal code: 21586 /21910
- ^{1} French Land Register data, which excludes lakes, ponds, glaciers > 1 km^{2} (0.386 sq mi or 247 acres) and river estuaries.

Saulon-la-Rue (French pronunciation: [solɔ̃ la ʁy]) is a commune in the Côte-d'Or department in eastern France.

== Population ==
Historical population
Year	Pop.	±% p.a.
1968	238	—
1975	326	+4.60%
1982	378	+2.14%
1990	451	+2.23%
1999	526	+1.72%
2007	566	+0.92%
2012	677	+3.65%
2017	703	+0.76%
2023	701	−0.05%
Source: INSEE

== See also ==
- Communes of the Côte-d'Or department
