= Saint-Philibert, Côte-d'Or =

Saint-Philibert
- Commune
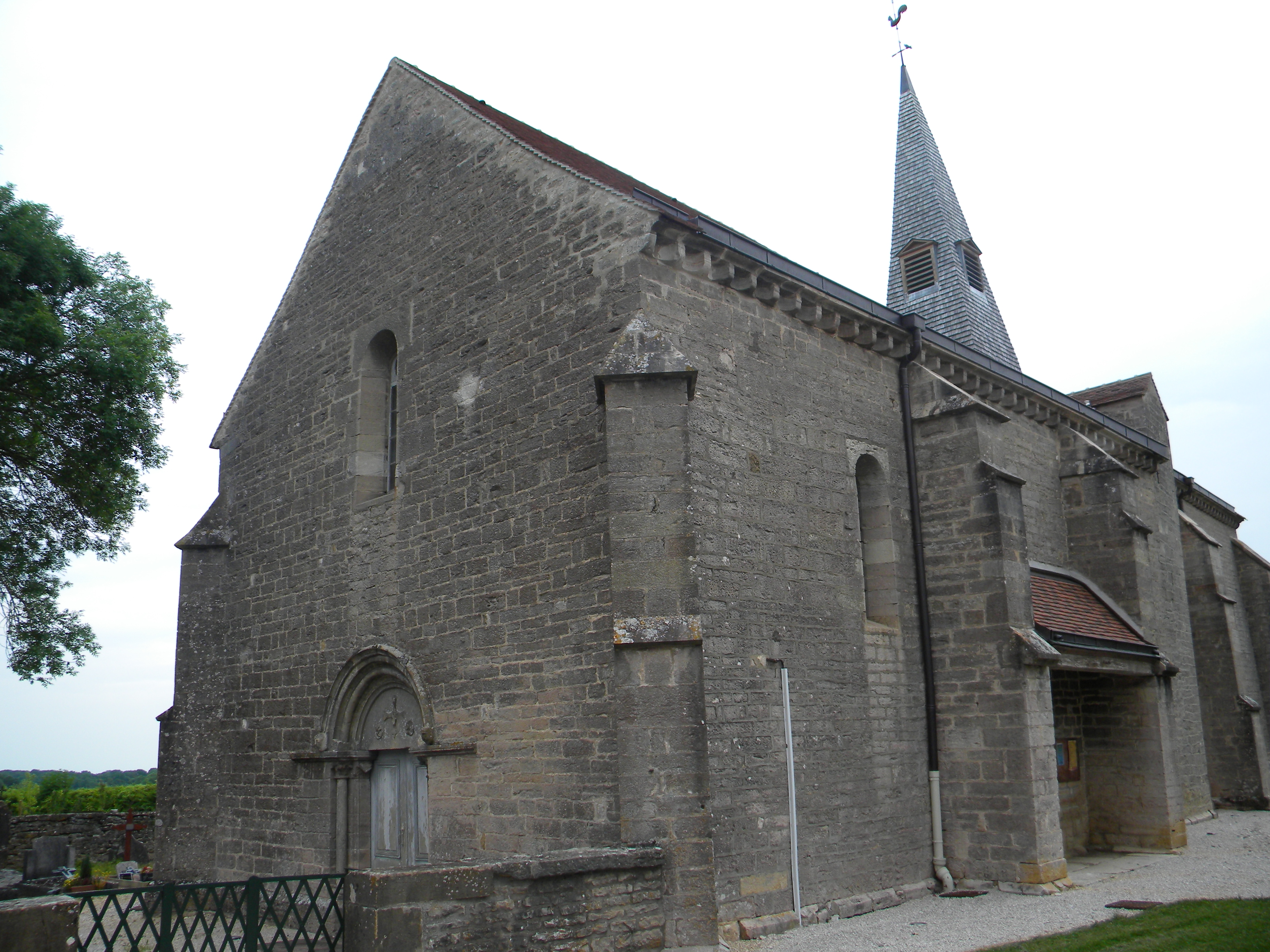
- The church in Saint-Philibert

- Coat of arms
- Location of Saint-Philibert
- Location within France Location within Bourgogne-Franche-Comté
- Coordinates: 47°12′23″N 5°00′43″E
- Country: France
- Region: Bourgogne-Franche-Comté
- Department: Côte-d'Or
- Arrondissement: Beaune
- Canton: Nuits-Saint-Georges

Government
  - Mayor (2020–2026): Hubert Poullot
- Area^{1}: 4.72 km^{2} (1.82 sq mi)
- Elevation: 240 m (790 ft)
- Highest elevation: 235 m (771 ft)
- Lowest elevation: 213 m (699 ft)
- Population (2023): 544
  - Density: 115/km^{2} (299/sq mi)
- Time zone: UTC+01:00 (CET)
  - Summer (DST): UTC+02:00 (CEST)
- INSEE/Postal code: 21565 /21220
- ^{1} French Land Register data, which excludes lakes, ponds, glaciers > 1 km^{2} (0.386 sq mi or 247 acres) and river estuaries.

Saint-Philibert (French pronunciation: [sɛ̃ filibɛʁ]) is a commune in the Côte-d'Or department in eastern France.

== Population ==
Historical population
Year	Pop.	±% p.a.
1968	136	—
1975	117	−2.13%
1982	296	+14.18%
1990	391	+3.54%
1999	410	+0.53%
2007	436	+0.77%
2012	449	+0.59%
2017	473	+1.05%
2023	544	+2.36%
Source: INSEE

== See also ==
- Communes of the Côte-d'Or department
