= Boncourt-le-Bois =

- Commune
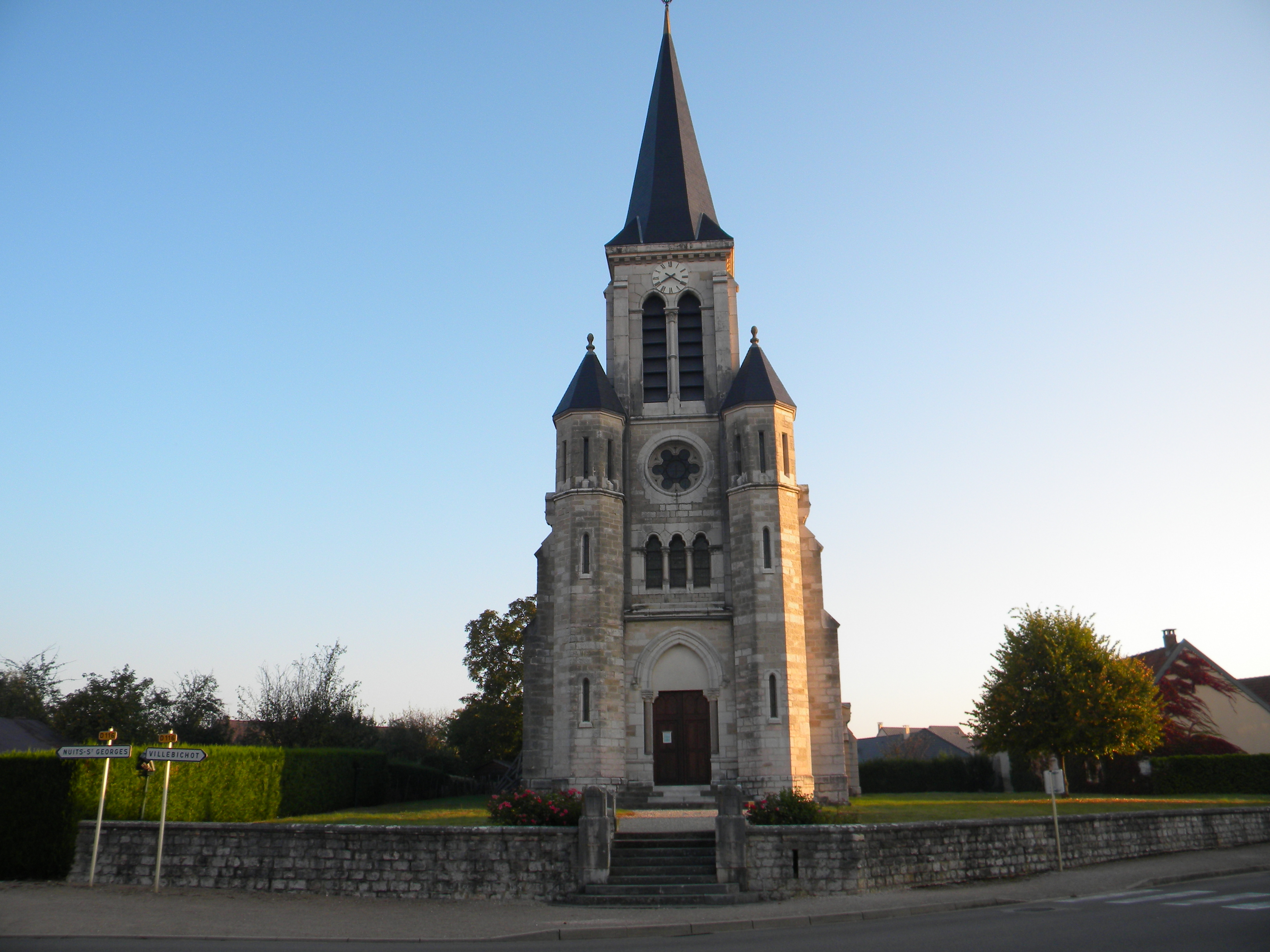
- The church in Boncourt-le-Bois

- Coat of arms
- Location of Boncourt-le-Bois
- Location within France Location within Bourgogne-Franche-Comté
- Coordinates: 47°08′16″N 4°59′38″E
- Country: France
- Region: Bourgogne-Franche-Comté
- Department: Côte-d'Or
- Arrondissement: Beaune
- Canton: Nuits-Saint-Georges

Government
  - Mayor (2020–2026): Évelyne Gauthey
- Area^{1}: 7.58 km^{2} (2.93 sq mi)
- Highest elevation: 247 m (810 ft)
- Lowest elevation: 200 m (660 ft)
- Population (2023): 270
  - Density: 36/km^{2} (92/sq mi)
- Time zone: UTC+01:00 (CET)
  - Summer (DST): UTC+02:00 (CEST)
- INSEE/Postal code: 21088 /21700
- ^{1} French Land Register data, which excludes lakes, ponds, glaciers > 1 km^{2} (0.386 sq mi or 247 acres) and river estuaries.

Boncourt-le-Bois (French pronunciation: [bɔ̃kuʁ lə bwa]) is a commune in the Côte-d'Or department in eastern France.

== Population ==
Historical population
Year	Pop.	±% p.a.
1968	123	—
1975	149	+2.78%
1982	154	+0.47%
1990	205	+3.64%
1999	213	+0.43%
2007	269	+2.96%
2012	287	+1.30%
2017	283	−0.28%
2023	270	−0.78%
Source: INSEE

== See also ==
- Communes of the Côte-d'Or department
