= Noiron-sous-Gevrey =

- Commune
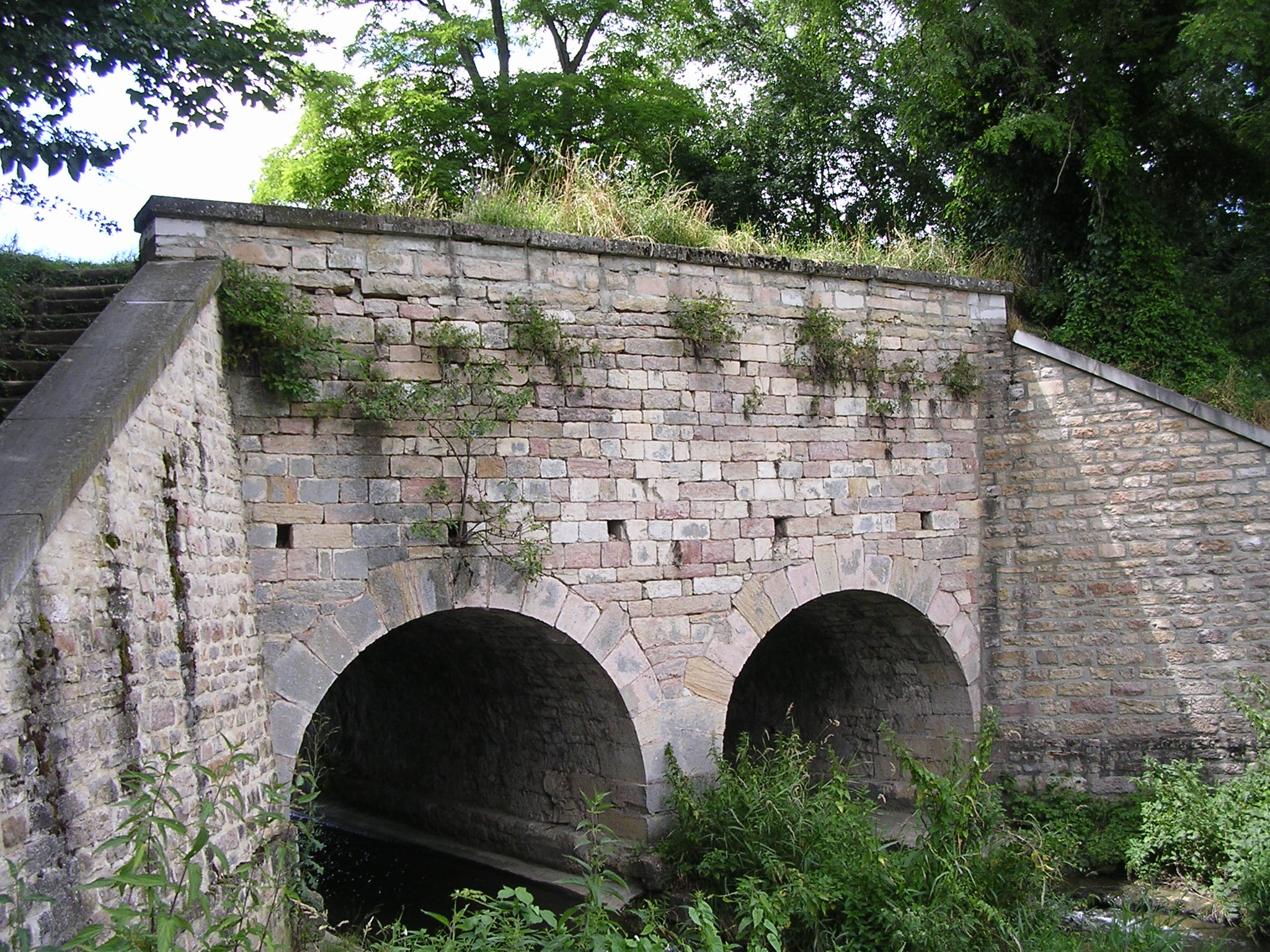
- Pont des Arvaux

- Coat of arms
- Location of Noiron-sous-Gevrey
- Location within France Location within Bourgogne-Franche-Comté
- Coordinates: 47°11′40″N 5°04′51″E
- Country: France
- Region: Bourgogne-Franche-Comté
- Department: Côte-d'Or
- Arrondissement: Beaune
- Canton: Nuits-Saint-Georges
- Intercommunality: Gevrey-Chambertin et Nuits-Saint-Georges

Government
  - Mayor (2020–2026): Olivier Pirat
- Area^{1}: 6.56 km^{2} (2.53 sq mi)
- Highest elevation: 227 m (745 ft)
- Lowest elevation: 195 m (640 ft)
- Population (2023): 1,134
  - Density: 173/km^{2} (448/sq mi)
- Time zone: UTC+01:00 (CET)
  - Summer (DST): UTC+02:00 (CEST)
- INSEE/Postal code: 21458 /21910
- ^{1} French Land Register data, which excludes lakes, ponds, glaciers > 1 km^{2} (0.386 sq mi or 247 acres) and river estuaries.

Noiron-sous-Gevrey (French pronunciation: [nwaʁɔ̃ su ʒəvʁɛ], literally Noiron under Gevrey) is a commune in the Côte-d'Or department in eastern France.

== Population ==
Historical population
Year	Pop.	±% p.a.
1968	264	—
1975	360	+4.53%
1982	405	+1.70%
1990	394	−0.34%
1999	705	+6.68%
2007	948	+3.77%
2012	1,067	+2.39%
2017	1,106	+0.72%
2023	1,134	+0.42%
Source: INSEE

== See also ==
- Communes of the Côte-d'Or department
