= Épernay-sous-Gevrey =

- Commune
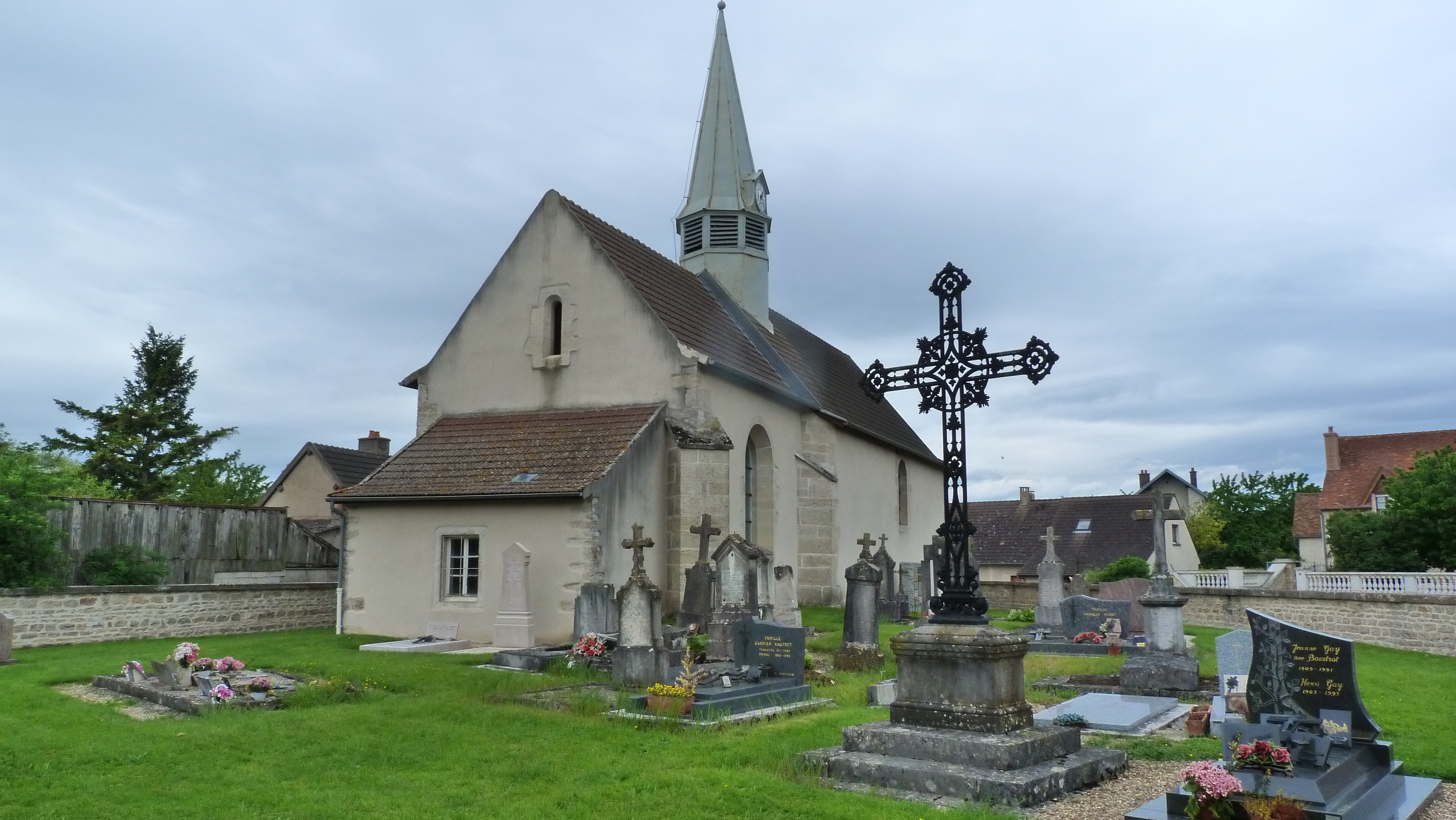
- The church in Épernay-sous-Gevrey
- Location of Épernay-sous-Gevrey
- Location within France Location within Bourgogne-Franche-Comté
- Coordinates: 47°10′52″N 5°02′03″E
- Country: France
- Region: Bourgogne-Franche-Comté
- Department: Côte-d'Or
- Arrondissement: Beaune
- Canton: Nuits-Saint-Georges

Government
  - Mayor (2020–2026): Jean-François Armbruster
- Area^{1}: 5.47 km^{2} (2.11 sq mi)
- Highest elevation: 230 m (750 ft)
- Lowest elevation: 205 m (673 ft)
- Population (2023): 151
  - Density: 27.6/km^{2} (71.5/sq mi)
- Time zone: UTC+01:00 (CET)
  - Summer (DST): UTC+02:00 (CEST)
- INSEE/Postal code: 21246 /21220
- ^{1} French Land Register data, which excludes lakes, ponds, glaciers > 1 km^{2} (0.386 sq mi or 247 acres) and river estuaries.

Épernay-sous-Gevrey (French pronunciation: [epɛʁnɛ su ʒəvʁɛ], literally Épernay under Gevrey) is a commune in the Côte-d'Or department in eastern France.

== Population ==
Historical population
Year	Pop.	±% p.a.
1968	78	—
1975	89	+1.90%
1982	116	+3.86%
1990	127	+1.14%
1999	162	+2.74%
2007	170	+0.60%
2012	187	+1.92%
2017	183	−0.43%
2023	151	−3.15%
Source: INSEE

== See also ==
- Communes of the Côte-d'Or department
