= Meuilley =

- Commune
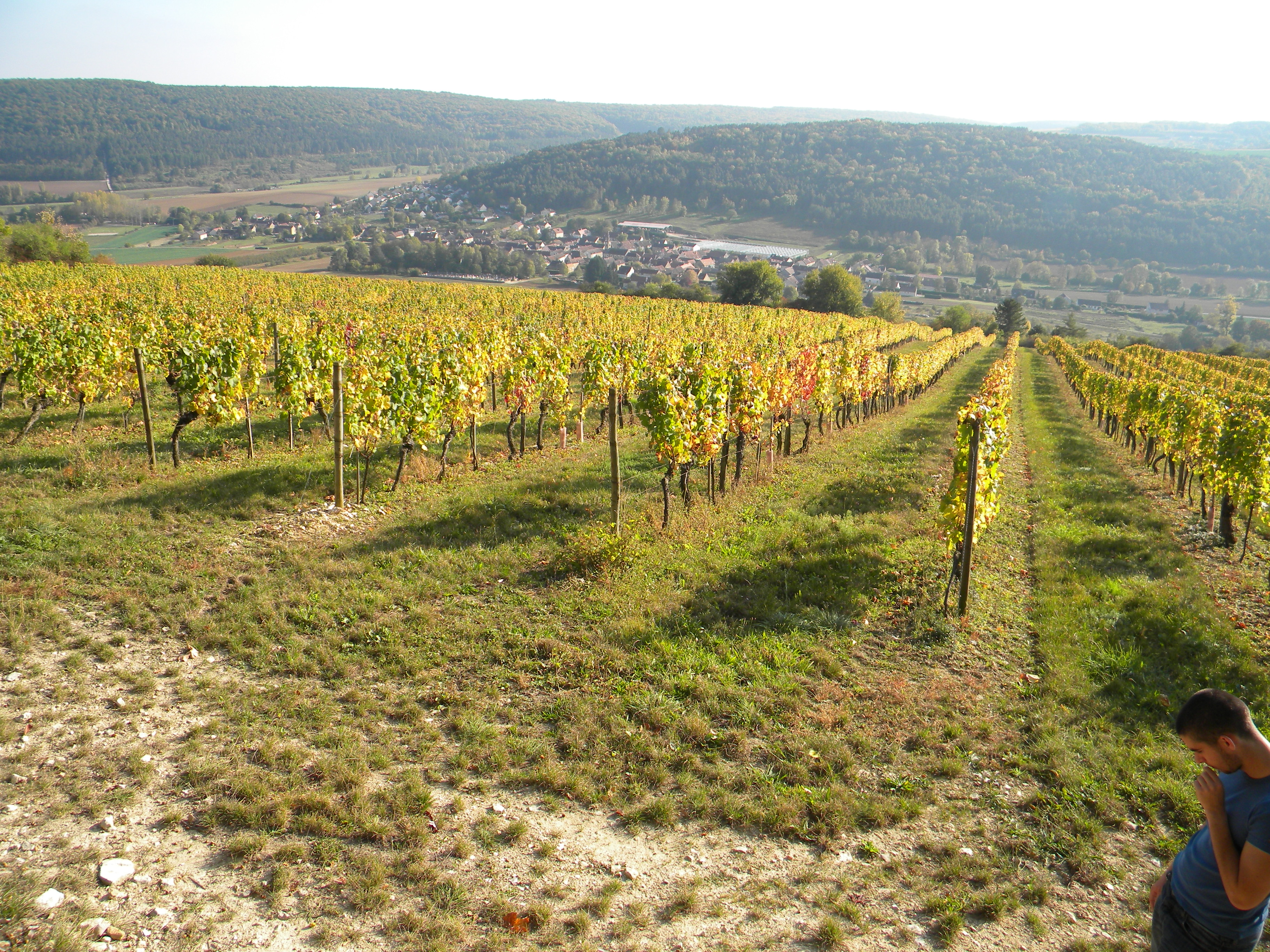
- A general view of Meuilley

- Coat of arms
- Location of Meuilley
- Location within France Location within Bourgogne-Franche-Comté
- Coordinates: 47°08′32″N 4°52′36″E
- Country: France
- Region: Bourgogne-Franche-Comté
- Department: Côte-d'Or
- Arrondissement: Beaune
- Canton: Nuits-Saint-Georges

Government
  - Mayor (2020–2026): Georges Strutynski
- Area^{1}: 6.1 km^{2} (2.4 sq mi)
- Elevation: 265 m (869 ft)
- Highest elevation: 475 m (1,558 ft)
- Lowest elevation: 268 m (879 ft)
- Population (2023): 411
  - Density: 67/km^{2} (170/sq mi)
- Time zone: UTC+01:00 (CET)
  - Summer (DST): UTC+02:00 (CEST)
- INSEE/Postal code: 21409 /21700
- ^{1} French Land Register data, which excludes lakes, ponds, glaciers > 1 km^{2} (0.386 sq mi or 247 acres) and river estuaries.

Meuilley (French pronunciation: [mœjɛ]) is a commune in the Côte-d'Or department in eastern France.

== Population ==
Historical population
Year	Pop.	±% p.a.
1968	280	—
1975	259	−1.11%
1982	419	+7.11%
1990	459	+1.15%
1999	411	−1.22%
2007	457	+1.33%
2012	453	−0.18%
2017	465	+0.52%
2023	411	−2.04%
Source: INSEE

== See also ==
- Communes of the Côte-d'Or department
