= Domaine Dujac =

Burgundy wine producer in Morey-Saint-Denis, France

Coordinates: 47.1939°N 4.9657°E

- Location: Morey-Saint-Denis, France
- Founded: 1967 (59 years ago)
- First vintage: 1969 (57 years ago)
- Key people: Jeremy Seysses, Diana Seysses, Alec Seysses
- Varietals: Pinot noir, Chardonnay
- Website: http://www.dujac.com/

Domaine Dujac is a Burgundy wine producer run by the Seysses family. Jacques Seysses, founded the domaine in 1967, and the first release was in 1969. He remains a part of the domaine's operation. Today, the domaine is largely run by Jacques' sons Jeremy and Alec, as well as Jeremy's wife Diana. Jeremy joined his parents in the winery from 1998. He was then followed by his wife Diana in 2001 and his brother Alec in 2003.

The original holdings were 4.5 hectares (11 acres) in Morey-Saint-Denis. Jacques later purchased plots in Échezeaux, Bonnes Mares Chambertin, Romanée St. Vivant and Vosne-Romanée 1er Cru Malconsorts. The Dujacs have purchased approximately 1.95 hectares (4.8 acres) in 6 parcels in Clos de la Roche, with an overall average age of 45–50 years. Additionally, they have 1.45 hectares (3.6 acres) in 2 parcels in Clos Saint-Denis, with an average age of 45–50 years.

== History ==
The domaine was founded in 1967 by Jacques Seysses, the son of a wealthy biscuit manufacturer, when he bought Domaine Marcel Graillet and the 4.5 hectares (11 acres) that Graillet held. Prior to this, Seysses had spent time as an apprentice at Domaine de la Pousse d'Or. As Graillet was a poor domaine that mainly sold wine to négociants, he found himself in the position of both needing to find a customer base while upgrading the winery; neither was accomplished until 1969, when the domaine's first bottling was released, mainly to restaurants, courtesy of Jacques' father's contacts through his biscuit company. By this time, the domaine expanded to include small holdings in Echézeaux and Bonnes-Mares. The domaine kept expanding its vineyard holdings, increasing acreage to 11.5 hectares (28 acres).

The domaine began using organic techniques in one third of their vineyards in 2001 as an experiment to see if it was feasible for them to do so for the entire domaine. It was, and the estate went all organic in 2008 and obtained their certification in 2011.

In 2005, the domaine divided up the purchase of Domaine Charles Thomas with the owners of Château de Puligny-Montrachet, taking over the Charles Thomas interests in Romanée-Saint-Vivant, Chambertin, Vosne-Romanée, Les Beaumonts and part of Vosne-Romanée, Les Malconsorts. To finance the purchase, some of the Charles Thomas plots were sold off immediately after purchase. This brought the vineyard holdings to approximately 15.5 hectares (38 acres).

== Vineyards, viticulture, and winemaking ==
Under Jacques, the domaine's wine were 100% whole-cluster pressed and fermented in 100% new oak barrels. Up until 1999, all the wines from the domaine were whole cluster pressed, with all new oak barrels used. When he ceded control to his sons in 1999, the style was changed significantly; some clusters are now destemmed, and the use of new oak can be as little as 25% depending on the wine and vintage characteristics. The domaine's Grand Cru wines generally see 100% new oak, the Premier Cru wines generally see 60-80% new oak, and Village wines generally see 40% new oak. The wine ages on the lees for a year, and is then racked to remove carbon dioxide. Bottling generally occurs in February or March.

Farming for all the vineyard holdings in the domaine, and plots that they work for other domaines, is all organic; no herbicides are used at all. In order to reduce vigor in younger vines, they use cordon training. The target for harvest is approximately 6 clusters of grapes, resulting in a harvest of approximately 35 hl/ha (just over 4,650 bottles per hectare).

The domaine's holdings are, in decreasing order of area, in the AOCs of Morey-Saint-Denis, Clos de la Roche, Vosne-Romanée 1er cru Aux Malconsorts, Clos Saint Denis, Gevrey-Chambertin 1er cru Les Combottes, Morey-Saint-Denis 1er cru, Vosne-Romanée 1er cru Les Beaux Monts, Charmes-Chambertin, Echézeaux, Morey Saint Denis Blanc, Chambolle Musigny, Morey-Saint-Denis 1er cru Les Monts Luisants, Bonnes Mares, Chambolle-Musigny 1er cru Les Gruenchers, Chambertin, Bourgogne Blanc, and Romanée-Saint-Vivant.

== See also ==
- French wine
- Terroir
- List of Burgundy Grand Crus
