= Morey-Saint-Denis wine =

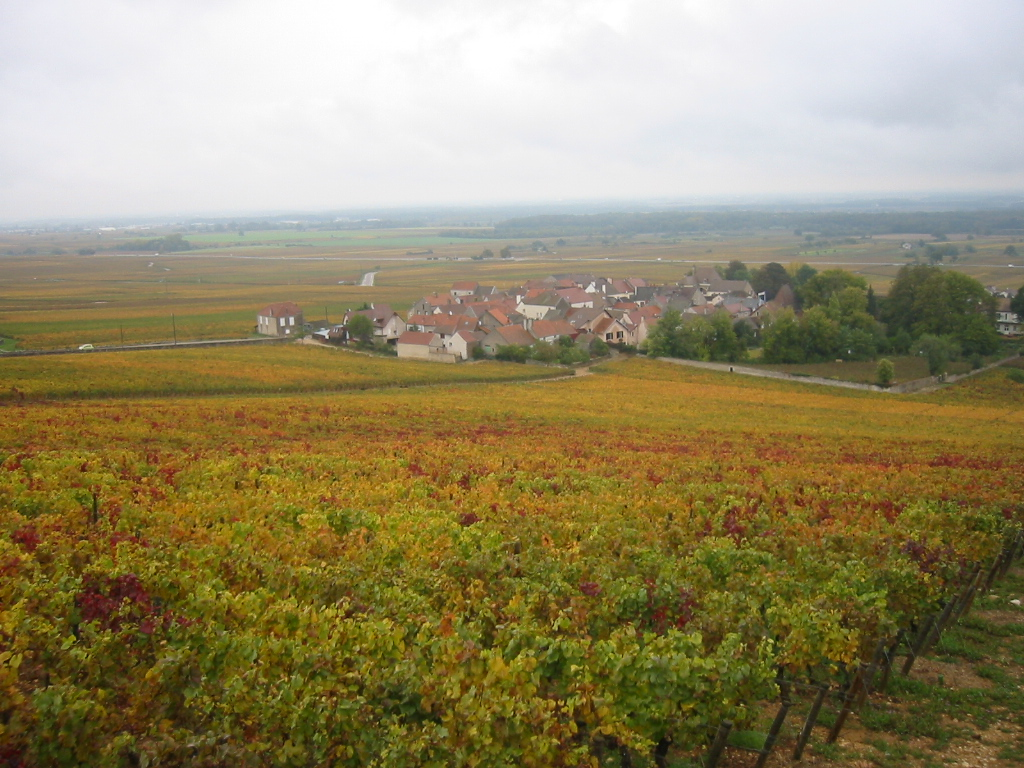
Vineyards surrounding Morey-Saint-Denis. Grand Cru vineyards in the foreground, Premier Cru vineyards immediately beyond the village, and village-level vineyards closest to the main road in the background.

Morey-Saint-Denis wine is produced in the commune of Morey-Saint-Denis in the Côte de Nuits subregion of Burgundy. The Appellation d'origine contrôlée (AOC) Morey-Saint-Denis may be used for red and white wine with respectively Pinot noir and Chardonnay as the main grape variety. The production of red wine dominates greatly, with around 96 per cent, and only around four per cent white wine. There are five Grand Cru vineyards with the commune: Clos de Tart, Clos des Lambrays, Clos Saint-Denis, Clos de la Roche and Bonnes Mares, which is shared with Chambolle-Musigny.

In 2008, 96.4 hectares (238 acres) of vineyard surface was in production for Morey-Saint-Denis at village and Premier Cru level, and 3,822 hectoliter of wine was produced, of which 3,679 hectoliter red wine and 143 hectoliter white wine. Some 4.55 hectares (11.2 acres) of this area was used for the white wines in 2007. The total amount produced corresponds to just over 500,000 bottles, of which just under 500,000 bottles of red wine and just under 20,000 bottles of white wine.

The AOC regulations allow up to 15 per cent total of Chardonnay, Pinot blanc and Pinot gris as accessory grapes in the red wines, but this not very often practiced. For white wines, both Chardonnay and Pinot blanc are allowed, but most wines are likely to be 100% Chardonnay. The allowed base yield is 40 hectoliter per hectare of red wine and 45 for white wine. The grapes must reach a maturity of at least 10.5 per cent potential alcohol for village-level red wine, 11.0 per cent for village-level white wine and Premier Cru red wine, and 11.5 per cent for Premier Cru white wine.

== Premiers Crus ==
The 20 climats in Morey-Saint-Denis listed below are classified as Premier Cru vineyards. Most Premier Cru vineyards are located in a band across the commune, both north and south of the village, immediately below the Route des Grands Crus. Their wines are designated Morey-Saint-Denis Premier Cru + vineyard name, or as just Morey-Saint-Denis Premier Cru, in which case it is possible to blend wine from several Premier Cru vineyards within the AOC. Blending wines from multiple Premier Cru vineyards is more common in Morey-Saint-Denis than other villages.

In 2007, 39.28 hectares (97.1 acres) of the total Morey-Saint-Denis vineyard surface consisted of Premier Cru vineyards, of which 38.54 hectares (95.2 acres) red and 0.74 hectares (1.8 acres) white Morey-Saint-Denis Premier Cru. The annual production of Premier Cru wine, as a five-year average, is 1,541 hectoliter of red wine and 42 hectoliter of white wine.

The Premier Cru vineyards are:

- Les Genavrières
- Monts Luisants
- Les Chaffots
- Clos Baulet
- Les Blanchards
- Les Gruenchers
- La Riotte
- Les Millandes
- Les Faconnières
- Les Charrières
- Clos des Ormes
- Aux Charmes
- Aux Cheseaux
- Les Chenevery
- Le Village
- Les Sorbès
- Clos Sorbé
- La Bussière
- Les Ruchots
- Côte Rôtie

== Grands Crus ==
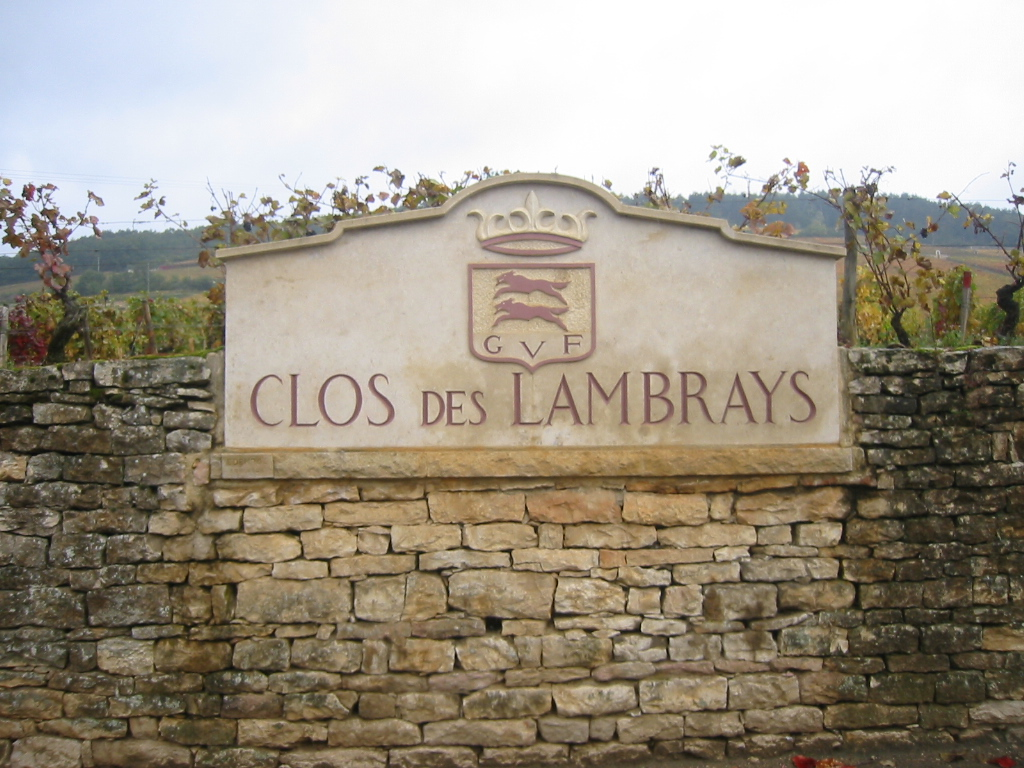
Clos des Lambrays, one of the Grand Cru vineyards of the commune.

The five Grands Crus form a continuous band across the commune, located immediately above the Route des Grands Crus and the village itself. Bonnes Mares is shared with Chambolle-Musigny (where its main part is located), but the other four vineyards are located entirely within Morey-Saint-Denis.
