= Chambolle-Musigny wine =

Wine from Burgundy, France

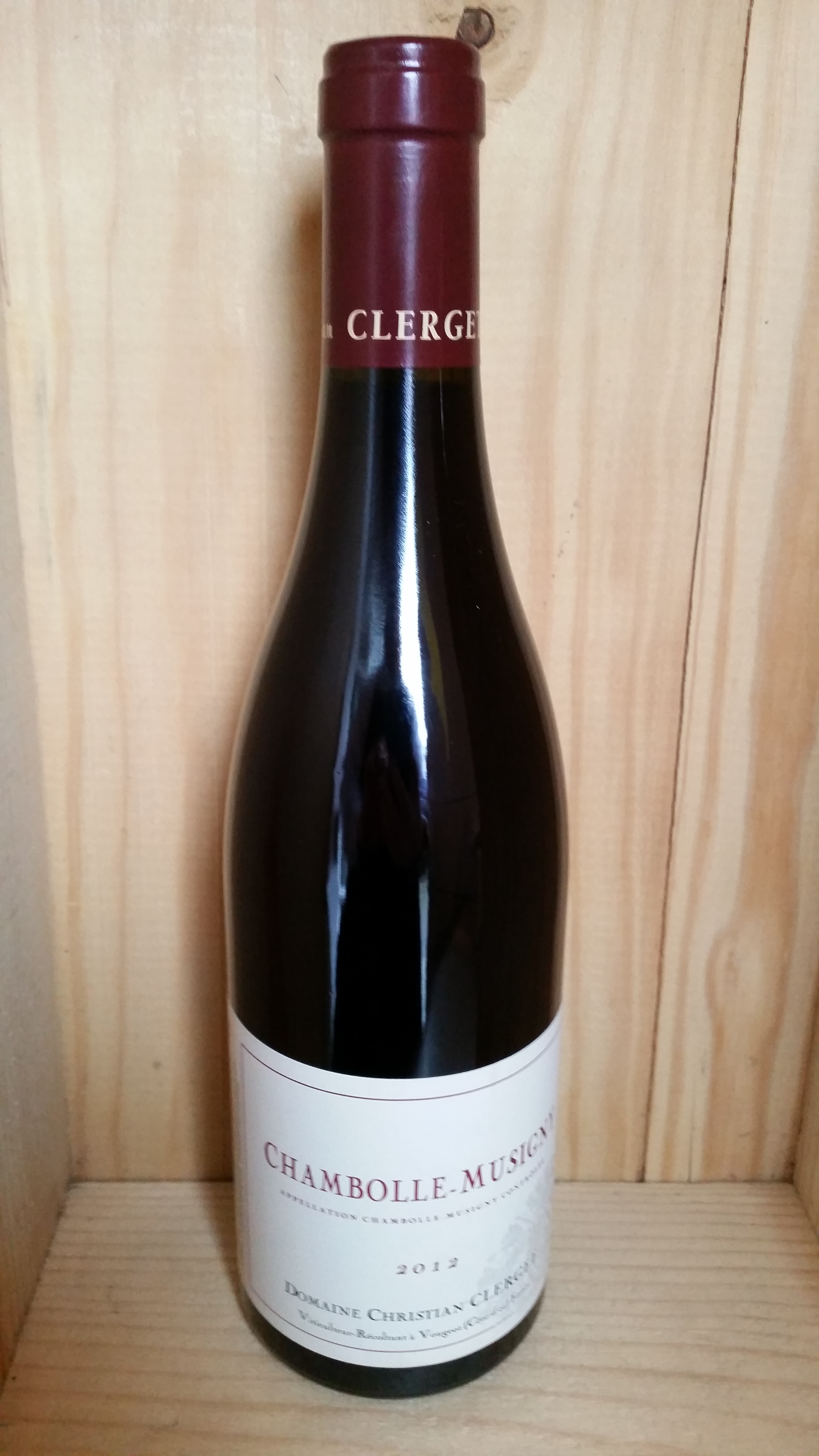
A bottle of Domaine Christian Clerget Chambolle-Musigny wine.

Chambolle-Musigny wine is produced in the village of Chambolle-Musigny in Côte de Nuits of Burgundy. The Appellation d'origine contrôlée (AOC) Chambolle-Musigny may only be used for red wine with Pinot noir as the main grape. There are 25 Premier Cru vineyards in Chambolle-Musigny, and two Grand Cru vineyards: Musigny and Bonnes Mares. The AOC was created in 1936.

In 2008, 152.23 hectares (376.2 acres) of vineyard surface was in production for Chambolle-Musigny at village and Premier Cru level, and 6,044 hectoliter of wine was produced, corresponding to slightly over 800,000 bottles. Within the commune, there are also vineyards (on the flatter land to the east of the N74 road) which are only entitled to the regional Bourgogne appellation.

The main grape variety is Pinot noir for red Musigny, and Chardonnay for white Musigny. The AOC regulations also allow up to 15 per cent total of Chardonnay, Pinot blanc and Pinot gris as accessory grapes in the red wine, but this not very often practiced. The allowed base yield is 40 hectoliter per hectare. The grapes must reach a maturity of at least 10.5 per cent potential alcohol for village-level wine, and 11.0 per cent for Premier Cru wine.

The wines of Chambolle-Musigny are typically described as the most "feminine" among the red wines of the Côte de Nuits, with floral elegance rather than power.

== Premiers Crus ==
The 25 climats in Chambolle-Musigny listed below are classified as Premier Cru vineyards. Their wines are designated Chambolle-Musigny Premier Cru + vineyard name, such as Chambolle-Musigny Premier Cru Les Amoureuses. They may also be labelled just Chambolle-Musigny Premier Cru, in which case it is possible to blend wine from several Premier Cru vineyards within the AOC.

In 2007, 55.43 hectares (137.0 acres) of the total Chambolle-Musigny vineyard surface consisted of Premier Cru vineyards, with an annual production of 2,052 hectoliter (corresponding to around 270,000 bottles) measured as a five-year average.

- Les Véroilles
- Les Sentiers
- Les Baudes
- Les Noirots
- Les Lavrottes
- Les Fuées
- Les Grands Murs
- Aux Beaux Bruns
- Aux Echanges
- Les Charmes
- Les Plantes
- Aux Combottes
- Derrière la Grange
- Les Gruenchers
- Les Groseilles
- Les Combottes
- Les Feusselottes
- Les Chatelots
- Les Cras
- Les Carrières
- Les Chabiots
- Les Amoureuses
- Les Borniques
- Les Hauts Doix
- La Combe d'Orveau

Of these Premier Cru vineyards, Les Amoureuses, is typically seen as the best of the group with Les Charmes as number two. The wines of Les Amoureuses are seen as very similar to the wines of Musigny (which borders on Les Amoureuses), and often command prices similar to other Grand Cru wines.

== Grands Crus ==
The two Grands Crus, Bonnes-Mares and Musigny, form their own AOCs. Bonnes-Mares covers 16.24 hectares (40.1 acres), of which a small part is located in the neighbouring commune of Morey-Saint-Denis, and Musigny covers 10.32 hectares (25.5 acres). Musigny is the only Grand Cru vineyard in Côte de Nuits which may also produce white wine, from Chardonnay under its AOC designation, although white wine make up less than 10 per cent of the production.
