= Frank Schoonmaker =

American writer (1905–1976)

Frank Musselman Schoonmaker (August 20, 1905 – January 11, 1976) was an American travel guide writer, wine writer and wine merchant. He was born in Spearfish, South Dakota, and attended for two years at Princeton University, after which he dropped out in 1925 to live and travel in Europe. He wrote two travel guides, Through Europe on Two Dollars a Day and Come with me to France, and, with the approaching end of Prohibition in the United States, researched and wrote a series of articles for The New Yorker. While involved in this latter project he met Raymond Baudoin, the editor of the La Revue du vin de France, who took him under his wing and taught him about wine, touring the various wine regions of France.

Schoonmaker also collaborated in the wine trade with Alexis Lichine, another wine writer. Together they were considered the most influential wine writers in the US for several decades. In January 1976, Frank Schoonmaker died at his home at 50 East 72nd Street in New York City.

== Army service ==
In 1939 Schoonmaker joined a new division of the U.S. Army known as the Office of Strategic Services or O.S.S, where he was stationed in Spain. He received the Bronze Star for his work with the O.S.S. After the war, Alexis Lichine negotiated a full partnership with Schoonmaker, but the wine partnership ended bitterly. In 1946, after many months of trying to find a compromise that would work for both, Lichine went to work as the import-export manager for United Distillers of America.

== Wine writings and marketing ==
Schoonmaker's importance was both as a writer, the author of the Complete Wine Book (1934) and later the classic Frank Schoonmaker's Encyclopedia of Wine, and as a wine importer, who found American markets especially for small scale growers in Burgundy such as Domaine Ponsot in Morey St Denis and the Marquis d'Angerville in Volnay. Together with Baudoin, Schoonmaker played a seminal role in creating a market for wines bottled by the grower/winemaker rather than by a negotiant' – a merchant/shipper. He started "Frank Schoonmaker Selections" in 1936 in New York City.

In 1972 The 'Frank Schoonmaker Selections' company was purchased by a division of the Souverain wine conglomerate. It was owned by Pillsbury of Minneapolis, Minnesota. In 1974 the Souverain wineries and the Frank Schoonmaker Import wine business were sold to St. Helena's Freemark Abbey wine group, and was renamed Rutherford Hill Winery. The same year a group of 179 grape growers bought the Alexander Valley Souverain facility. It has since become the property of Francis Ford Coppola. The Frank Schoonmaker Selections division was liquidated in 1975.

== Consulting work ==
As a consultant to such Californian wineries as Wente and Almaden, Schoonmaker introduced the idea of labeling wines using varietal names (such as Pinot noir, Chardonnay, or Riesling) rather than semi-generic names borrowed from European regions ("Burgundy", "Chablis", "Rhine", etc.). Schoonmaker claimed that "the more specific the name, the better the wine". While Schoonmaker was promoting the practice in California already around 1940, it did not become truly widespread until the late 1960s and early 1970s. Robert Mondavi was one of the first to label the majority of his wines by varietal names and was tireless in promoting the practice. This has become the standard in New World wine and some European producers are adopting the practice because of consumer demand.

== See also ==
- List of wine personalities
