= Domaine Ponsot =

Wine producer in Burgundy, France

- Location: Morey-Saint-Denis, France
- Coordinates: 47.200735°N 4.958385°E
- Founded: 1872 (154 years ago)
- First vintage: 1934 (92 years ago)
- Key people: Rose-Marie Ponsot
- Cases/yr: Approximately 2500
- Known for: Clos de la Roche Cuvée Vieilles Vignes, Clos St. Denis Cuvée Très Vieilles Vignes, Morey-Saint-Denis Blanc 1^{er} cru Clos des Monts Luisants
- Varietals: Pinot noir, Aligoté
- Website: http://www.domaine-ponsot.com

Domaine Ponsot is a wine producer in Burgundy, France that produces white and red wine. They are best known for their Morey-Saint-Denis Blanc 1^{er} cru Clos des Monts Luisants — the only premier cru Burgundy made entirely from Aligoté — and their flagship reds, the Clos de la Roche Cuvée Vieilles Vignes, and the Clos St. Denis Cuvée Très Vieilles Vignes. The domaine's wine was famously counterfeited in the Wine Auction Scandal that resulted in Rudy Kurniawan's arrest.

== History ==
Domaine Ponsot was founded in 1872 when William Ponsot's father purchased a house for him and some vineyards in Morey-Saint-Denis, after William returned from serving in the Franco-Prussian War. A small amount of the domaine's wine was bottled by them at this time, mainly for private use and for the family's restaurants (they owned the franchise for all the station buffets in northern Italy at the time). When William died childless in 1926, the domaine was passed to William's nephew, Hippolyte Ponsot. At the time, the domaine's holdings included Clos des Monts Luisants, a vineyard founded by William and planted with Aligoté in 1911, and a parcel of Clos de la Roche. The domaine also cultivated fruit from other appellations, such as Les Charmes and Les Combottes in Gevrey-Chambertin. The planting of Aligoté was unusual at the time; most white wine production in Burgundy had leaned towards the more economically viable Chardonnay grape in the post-Phylloxera era.

The domaine began estate bottling in 1934; a rarity at the time, something only a dozen domaines did prior to World War II. They also began selling wine outside France, including to the United States, at this time. The first labels were hand-stamped and signed by Hippolyte, something he did by the fireplace in the days before television. During 1934 and 1935, Hippolyte was active in defining the Appellation d'origine contrôlée system in Burgundy, something his prior training as a lawyer and diplomat was useful in.

Hippolyte retired in 1957, passing the domaine to his son, Jean-Marie Ponsot (former mayor of Morey-Saint-Denis, former president of the Cadets de Bourgogne and Grand Echanson of the Confrerie des Chevaliers du Tastevin), who had been working at the domaine since 1942 as co-winemaker and co-viticulturalist.

In 1961, the domaine began working several new parcels under a type of agreement known as metayage—plots in Chambolle-Musigny, Chambertin, and Latricières-Chambertin. Their holdings expanded again in 1972, when Jean-Marie's wife, Jacqueline Ponsot Livera, inherited vines in Gevrey.

The domaine was incorporated into a property company in 1975, with Jean-Marie, Jacqueline, Denis, and Marie-Antoinette Ponsot as principals.

In 1981, Jean-Marie's son, Laurent Ponsot, began working at the domaine. This year also saw an expansion of the domaine's metayage agreements, adding access to Griotte Chambertin, Chambertin, Clos St Denis, and Chambolle Les Charmes from Domaine des Chezeaux (the Mercier family). Laurent took over winemaking duties at the domaine from 1983 until 2017, when he left to found Domaine Laurent Ponsot. Laurent's sister Rose-Marie remains as sole proprietor.

=== Counterfeit wines ===
Domaine Ponsot's wines were at the center of a scandal involving counterfeit bottles: in 2011, Rudy Kurniawan consigned several vintages of the domaine's wine for auction at the New York auction house of Acker, Merrall & Condit including Clos St. Denis 1945, 1949, 1959, 1962, 1964, 1966, 1971, and 1978, along with a 1929 Clos de la Roche. However, since the domaine did not estate bottle prior to 1934, and only started manufacturing wine from Clos St. Denis in 1982, Laurent Ponsot identified that these bottles were forgeries, and also noted label and sealing inconsistencies with several lots.

He contacted the auction house, and flew to New York to see for himself that the lots (worth an estimated $603,000 — $880,641 in 2024 dollars) were pulled from the sale.

After the auction lots were pulled, Laurent wondered if Kurniawan was "a victim or predator," but once he met with Kurniawan, he became convinced that "it was the latter." After that point, he began working with the United States Federal Bureau of Investigation in the matter of the faked wines.

== Vineyards, viticulture, and winemaking ==
As of 2008 (the last year for which records are available), Domaine Ponsot has produced wine from 10 vineyards. The domaine grows wine with a serious nod to biodynamic processes, using no fertilizer, pesticides, or weed killer, although the domaine makes no claim to being organic or biodynamic. At harvest time (Domaine Ponsot is one of the last producers to pick grapes in the Côte de Nuits), the grapes are selected in the vineyard (the domaine does not use a sorting table), picked into wicker baskets, generally not having been destemmed, for crushing on the winery's 1945-era vertical press.

After pressing, the wine is gravity-fed into oak, computer-temperature-controlled, fermenting tanks, where fermentation takes 10 to 20 days. Pigeage is done three times daily. From there, the wine is gravity-fed down to the barrel cellar. It is aged up to 30 months in barrels that are a minimum of 5 years old, before bottling occurs during a time when there is both a waning moon and a north wind. There is no use of sulfites; instead, the wine is kept under a blanket of nitrogen during racking and bottling to protect it from oxidation. The labels of the domaine have a white spot that will turn grey if the ink in them is subjected to extreme temperatures, thus indicating that the wine may be damaged.

=== Clos de la Roche vieilles vignes Grand Cru ===
Domaine Ponsot is the largest landholder in Clos de la Roche, holding 3 of the original 4 hectares of the vineyard's original definition (it has since been expanded to approximately 13.41 hectares).

- Grape variety: Pinot noir
- Vineyard holding: 3.5 hectares (8.6 acres)
- Estate bottling: 1934
- Planting date: 1947
- 2008 production: 10,860.75 liters (11,101 bottles, 1,450 magnums, 100 jeroboams, 10 mathusalems)

=== Clos St Denis vieilles vignes Grand Cru ===
This is farmed under the 1982 metayage agreement with the Mercier family. From the 2006 vintage onwards, the wine produced by Ponsot from this vineyard has been labelled as "Très Vieilles Vignes".

- Grape variety: Pinot noir
- Vineyard holding: 0.7 hectares (1.7 acres)
- Estate bottling: 1982
- Planting date: 1905
- 2008 production: 1006.5 liters (862 bottles, 180 magnums, 20 jeroboams, 5 mathusalems)

=== Chambertin Grand Cru ===
Although the domaine records indicate a wine made in Chambertin as early as 1969, the current parcel is farmed under the 1982 Metayage Agreement with the Mercier family. These holdings are only 9 rows of vines.

- Grape variety: Pinot noir
- Vineyard holding: 0.2 hectares (0.49 acres)
- Estate bottling: 1969
- Planting date: 1955
- 2008 production: 260.25 liters (274 bottles, 36 magnums, 3 jeroboams, 2 mathusalems)

=== Chapelle Chambertin Grand Cru ===
- Grape variety: Pinot noir
- Vineyard holding: 0.7 hectares (1.7 acres)
- Estate bottling: 1970
- Planting date: 1990
- 2008 production: 2328.75 liters (2,665 bottles, 180 magnums, 10 jeroboams, 2 mathusalems)

=== Griotte Chambertin Grand Cru ===
This is farmed under the 1982 metayage agreement with the Mercier family.

- Grape variety: Pinot noir
- Vineyard holding: 0.9 hectares (2.2 acres)
- Estate bottling: 1982
- Planting date: 1990
- 2008 production: 2499 liters (2,916 bottles, 180 magnums, 10 jeroboams, 2 mathusalems)

=== Chambolle Musigny 1er Cru Les Charmes ===
This is farmed under the 1982 metayage agreement with the Mercier family.

- Grape variety: Pinot noir
- Vineyard holding: 0.9 hectares (2.2 acres)
- Estate bottling: 1982
- Planting date: 1990
- 2008 production: 1631.25 liters (2,039 bottles, 60 magnums, 4 jeroboams)

=== Morey St Denis 1er Cru Cuvée des Alouettes ===
This land was part of the domaine since its inception in 1872. It is a part of the Clos des Monts Luisants vineyard.

- Grape variety: Pinot noir
- Vineyard holding: 1.0 hectare (2.5 acres)
- Estate bottling: 1982
- Planting date: 1990
- 2008 production: 3100.5 liters (3,754 bottles, 180 magnums, 5 jeroboams)

=== Chambolle Musigny Cuvée des Cigales ===
These vines were purchased from Léni Volpato in 2001.

- Grape variety: Pinot noir
- Vineyard holding: 1.0 hectare (2.5 acres)
- Estate bottling: 2002
- Planting date: 1965
- 2008 production: 1390.5 liters (1,854 bottles)

=== Gevrey Chambertin Cuvée de l'Abeille ===
These vines were inherited by the Ponsots 1975.

- Grape variety: Pinot noir
- Vineyard holding: 0.5 hectares (1.2 acres)
- Estate bottling: 1989
- Planting date: 1965
- 2008 production: 1808.25 liters (2,411 bottles)

=== Morey St Denis 1er Cru Clos des Monts Luisants ===
This is a monopole of Domaine Ponsot, part of the estate's original landholdings. With the 2006 vintage and before, back to the early 1950s, this wine contained a portion of Chardonnay and prior to 1992, back to the late 1930s, a portion of Pinot Gouges/Pinot Musigny as well. This is currently the only 1^{er} Cru Aligoté produced in Burgundy. This wine is fermented in old barrels and does not get put through malolactic fermentation.

- Grape variety: Aligoté
- Vineyard holding: 0.98 hectares (2.4 acres)
- Estate bottling: 1934
- Planting date: 1911
- 2008 production: 2277.75 litres (2,333 bottles, 300 magnums, 20 jeroboams, 3 mathusalems)

== See also ==
- French wine
- List of Burgundy Grand Crus
- Old vines
