= Lalou Bize-Leroy =

French businesswoman and winery owner (born 1932)

Lalou Bize-Leroy (born 1932) is a French businesswoman and winery owner in the Burgundy wine region. Bize-Leroy owns the wineries Domaine d'Auvenay and Domaine Leroy.

== Career ==
Bize-Leroy established herself as a businesswoman in the Burgundy wine business in 1955, when she took over her father Henri Leroy's (1894–1980) négociant business. From 1974, she was co-managing the Burgundy winery Domaine de la Romanée-Conti (DRC), one of the world's top wine estates, and was in charge of marketing. Along with Aubert de Villaine, Bize-Leroy helped build DRC's top wine Romanée-Conti into one of the most sought after wines in the world. A series of disagreements, including Bize-Leroy's displeasure at de Villaine's involvement in the Judgment of Paris wine tasting and disputes over Bize-Leroy's handling of the distribution of the Domaine's wines, led to her being ousted in 1992.

After leaving DRC, she has focused on her own domains. By 1988, she had acquired significant vineyard holdings for Domaine Leroy. During the 1990s, she established Domaine Leroy as one of the leading Burgundy wineries.

== Personal life ==
Bize-Leroy married Marcel Bize (d. 2004), in 1958 and they have one daughter Perrine Fenal. Bize-Leroy also had a sister Pauline Roch (1929-2009).

== Wine philosophy ==
Bize-Leroy is a strong believer in biodynamic wine production, and practices it in her domaines.

== Popular culture ==
The 2013 Domaine D'Auvenay Chevailier-Montrachet Grand Cru 2013 vintage white Burgundy wine had a cameo appearance on Your Friends & Neighbors (season 1, episode 3) with Jon Hamm, in his role as the lead character, estimating the retail value at approximately $32,000 per bottle. The Wine Spectator did their own calculations and fact-checked the writers of the show as to the retail price. The most expensive bottle of that white burgundy in 2013 sold for about $20,000, they reported.
