= Jerry Rothwell =

British documentary filmmaker

Jerry Rothwell is a British documentary filmmaker best known for the award-winning feature docs How to Change the World (2015), Town of Runners (2012), Donor Unknown (2010), Heavy Load (2008) and Deep Water (2006). All of his films have been produced by Al Morrow of Met Film.

== Filmmaking ==
Rothwell's first feature documentary, Deep Water, (co-directed with Louise Osmond), is about Donald Crowhurst's ill-fated voyage in the 1968 round the world yacht race. The Hollywood Reporter said, "Deep Water is a stunning documentary that not only beautifully elucidates a nearly forgotten incident but touches on crucial themes involving isolation, sanity, self-worth, impossible dreams, the nature of heroism and limits of human endurance." The Baltimore Sun commented, "...the less said about this film the better. It's that good." The film premiered at Rome International Film Festival in 2008, where it won the award for Best Documentary. And Philadelphia's The Inquirer, gave it 3 and half out of 4 stars, calling it "fascinating".

Shot over two years, Heavy Load is about a group of people with learning disabilities who form a punk band and the journey of recording their first album “The Queen Mother’s Dead.” The Herald Scotland said, "... there aren't too many quietly moving documentaries about thrash punk bands, which is just one reason to treasure Jerry Rothwell's film…Although a portrait of a band, Heavy Load is as much about the lives of people with learning disabilities - chaperoned dates and all. Respectful and never patronizing, Rothwell genuinely connects with his subjects."

Donor Unknown tells the story of sperm donor, Jeffrey Harrison, and his many offspring. Rothwell describes it as "a story that provokes us to question what a family is. Through a bizarre set of coincidences, Jeffrey and his children are negotiating new kinds of relationship, for which there aren’t really any social rules. What does a connection based solely on genetics mean? Can it become the basis of a lasting ‘family’ relationship? Is it emotionally necessary for the child? And what does it mean for the biological father? I was excited about how those questions were raised for this specific group of people, connected by a single sperm donor.” Total Film claims "Donor Unknown is a skillfully constructed look at a very modern family."

Town of Runners is a feature documentary about two girls in the Ethiopian village of Bekoji who want to become track athletes. The initial idea for the film came from one of the producers, Dan Demissie. Rothwell wanted to make the film "... because as a child I lived in Kenya in the 1970s, and my heroes weren’t George Best or Neil Armstrong, but the East African runners of the time such as Kip Keino. Much later, my daughter had become a keen athlete and I was interested in how some children seize on a sense of their own potential and develop an ambition, which is strong enough to sustain them through the hardships of daily training. And I wondered how that played out in an African context." Little White Lies said, "the beauty of Town of Runners lies in is its subtlety. … Rothwell’s careful cinematography is careful to make sure that the film is not a simplistic fable of sporting optimism…. Heartfelt, lively and candid, Town of Runners deserves be the sleeper hit of this Olympic year." The Financial Times called it "a fantastically cool British documentary.” Total Film said, "Dispelling the usual clichés about Africa, Rothwell reveals instead an entrepreneurial community where "running is work" and villagers chip in two per cent of their salaries to support coach Sentayehu Eshetu. Fluctuations in form, funding and bureaucracy hinder the girls’ progress but their ambition never wavers. In an Olympic year, here's an inspirational reminder of what it's all about.” The film had its world premiere at the Tribeca Film Festival in 2012.

In 2015, Rothwell released the documentary How To Change The World. A New York Times "Critics Pick", the film tells the story of the founders of Greenpeace - an eclectic group who set out to stop an atomic bomb test in Alaska in 1971, and began what has grown into a multimillion-dollar organization. Rothwell based his documentary on the journals and other writings of Robert Hunter, one of the founding members of Greenpeace. The film premiered at Sundance Film Festival in 2015 and won a Special Jury Award for Best Editing. The New York Times called the film, "engrossing", stating "... while the film, polished and paced like a caper flick, captures the excitement of the make-it-up-as-you-go early days, Mr. Rothwell also highlights the stresses that come after a movement takes on a life of its own." The Telegraph of London, called the piece, "remarkable", saying it was "... a devastating illustration of how power corrupts," and stating that "Whatever your politics, this documentary about the founders of Greenpeace is essential viewing". They lauded Rothwell's ability to remain apolitical in telling the story.

Rothwell co-directed the 2016 documentary, Sour Grapes, with Reuben Atlas. The film traces the case of what is considered to be the largest wine-fraud case in history. It follows the rise of Rudy Kurniawan in the world of wine connoisseurs, followed by the detective work of Laurent Ponsot, the doyen of Domaine Ponsot, and Bill Koch, which went into exposing his fraud. The film had its world premiere at the 2016 Hot Docs Festival on May 3.

At Met Film Production, he has been an executive producer and worked as an editor on numerous feature documentaries including Dylan Williams’ Men Who Swim and Sarah Gavron's The Village At The End Of The World.

== Film awards and nominations ==
Rothwell has won and been nominated for numerous awards. His first documentary, Deep Water won the award for "Best Documentary" at the 2008 Rome International Film Festival, where it had premiered. It was also awarded the Best Cinema Documentary for 2007 at The Grierson Awards. In 2012, Donor Unknown won the Tribeca (Online) Film Festival Best Feature Film award, as well as being nominated for a Grierson Award, this time for "Best Documentary on a Contemporary Theme - International". How to Change the World was awarded the "World Cinema Documentary Special Jury Award for Editing" at the Sundance Film Festival, as well as the Candescent Award.
