= Hendra Rahardja =

Indonesian criminal fugitive

- Born: 2 February 1943; Makassar, Indonesia
- Died: 26 January 2003 (aged 59)
- Status: Escaped 1997
- Criminal charges: Embezzlement
- Penalty: Life imprisonment

Hendra Rahardja or Tan Tjoe Hing (born in Makassar, South Sulawesi, 2 February 1943) was an Indonesian businessman of Chinese descent. He is the older brother of Eddy Tansil.

His nephew is Rudy Kurniawan.

He owned the Bank Harapan Sentosa bank in Indonesia.

Hendra Rahardja was President of both Bank Harapan Sentosa (BHS) and Bank Guna International (BGI) during President Suharto's New Order regime. Rahardja fled Indonesia during Indonesia's economic crisis in September 1997 following the liquidation of his banks. At the time of liquidation, Rahardja's banks held a combined total of US$1.4 billion in assets. Two years later, he was arrested trying to enter Australia from Hong Kong on June 1, 1999, at Sydney's Kingsford-Smith International Airport on a warrant from Indonesian authorities circulated by Interpol. Although Indonesia has an extradition treaty with Australia, he was never extradited before his death on January 26, 2003.

In 2002, an Indonesian court sentenced Rahardja to life in prison in absentia for misusing 1.95 trillion rupiah (US$216.7 million) in central bank liquidity credits, a fine of Rp30 million and required him to pay indemnities worth Rp1.9 trillion (about US$280 million). So far, Indonesia has been able to recover US$3 million from Australia. However, according to the Indonesian Attorney General Office, the bulk of Rahardja's estimated US$9.3 billion in assets remain in Hong Kong, the Cayman Islands, and British Virgin Islands, where co-operation difficulties are delaying recovery.

However, there have recently been positive developments in co-operation to recover Rahardja's assets. Australia is currently in negotiations with Hong Kong to bring US$800 million of Raharja's assets back to Indonesia. Australia is said to be involved because the money was channeled through Australian banks, but also because Indonesia was having no luck on its own. Indonesia is reported to have originally contacted Hong Kong directly to return the assets, but Hong Kong asked Indonesia to pay a 20 percent administration fee and then to split the remaining 80 percent between the two countries.
