= Domaine Leroy =

Vineyard estate which produces red Burgundy

Coordinates: 47.1558°N 4.9559°E

Domaine Leroy is a vineyard estate which produces red Burgundy. The winery is located in the wine producing village of Auxey-Duresses. The winery is split between negociant label Maison Leroy and wines of their own vineyards called Domaine Leroy.

The domaine has always produced biodynamic wine, and is certified by ECOCERT. Lalou Bize-Leroy of Domaine Leroy also owns a quarter of Domaine de la Romanée-Conti. The domaine has 23 hectares of vines, mostly Premier Cru and Grand Cru classified. Lalou Bize-Leroy became the managing director of the winery in 1971. As a wine producer, Domaine Leroy is regarded as one of the most sought after, rare and expensive wines in Burgundy's Côte d'Or and the world. For example, a recent vintage bottlings of Leroy's Musigny Grand Cru red wine made from pinot noir exceed tens of thousands of dollars per bottle.

== History of the estate ==
Domaine Leroy's history traces back to at least 1868, when François Leroy established a negociant business Maison Leroy in the village of Auxey-Duresses, a wine producing village close to Meursault. The wine portfolio was expanded by Francois' son Joseph Leroy. Joseph Leroy's son Henri was a crucial player at the estate's helms in the early-to-mid 20th-century, entering the winery's hands in 1919. As a wine merchant, Joseph Leroy developed close business ties with the famed Domaine de la Romanee Conti and its ownership pair of director Edmond Gaudin de Villaine and brother-in-law Jacques Chambon. With the expansion of business ties and Domaine de la Romanee Conti's financial difficulties in the early 1940s, Joseph Leroy bought Chambon's share (equal to 50% of the Domaine's holdings and ownership) in 1942.

Lalou Bize-Leroy joined the winery as managing director in 1971. In 1988, Bize-Leroy expanded the Domaine and bought Charles Nöellat's holdings, subsequently establishing the Domaine Leroy, which focused on wines produced in the domaine's own holdings. Since then, the Domaine holdings have been farmed biodynamically, and Bize-Leroy's role with biodynamic viticulture have labelled her a pioneer in the field.

== Wine parcel holdings and bottlings ==
Domaine Leroy is known for its tiny quantity of wines produced in well-regarded and prestigious premier and grand crus of Burgundy's AOCs. The winery cultivates roughly 22 hectares of vines, with an annual production of roughly 40000 bottles, depending on the vintage. Leroy bottles some of the most prestigious vineyard parcels in Burgundy, including the grand crus of Chambertin, Musigny, Richebourg, Clos de Vougeot, Romanee Saint-Vivant, Clos de la Roche and Corton Charlemagne as well as premier crus Beaux Monts, Les Narbantons and Les Perrieres.
