= Eddy Tansil =

Indonesian businessman (born 1953)

- Born: Tan Tjoe Hong; 2 February 1953 (age 73); Makassar, Indonesia
- Status: Escaped May 1996
- Criminal charges: Embezzlement
- Penalty: 17 years

Eddy Tansil, born Tan Tjoe Hong (Chinese: 陳珠芳; Pe̍h-ōe-jī: Tan Chu Hong, born 2 February 1953) is an Indonesian businessman of Chinese descent who bribed his way out of Cipinang Prison, Jakarta, on 4 May 1996 while serving a 17-year sentence for embezzling $420 million in loans from Bank Pembangunan Indonesia, which subsequently went bust and was amalgamated into Bank Mandiri.

== Criminal penalty ==
In 1994, Tansil was sentenced to 17 years in prison, fined 30 million rupiah, ordered to pay 500 billion rupiah compensation, and repay state losses of 1.3 trillion rupiah. Tansil's escape in 1996 was facilitated by corrupt prison officials.

== After prison escape ==
An anti-corruption watchdog, Gempita, determined in 1998 that Tansil was conducting business under a corporate license of German company Becks Beer in Putian, Fujian, China.

In 2013, Eddy Tansil's presence in China since 2011 was confirmed, and an extradition request was submitted to the Chinese government. In 2015, Tansil was reportedly residing in Macau.

Indonesian news website Tirto.id in July 2019 reported that Tansil had defaulted on a bank loan in China in 2002. He had reportedly borrowed 389.92 million renminbi (then $47 million) from the Bank of China, putting up land assets and two factories in Putian as collateral, but failed to repay the amount and then challenged efforts to confiscate his assets.

== Family ==
He is a brother of Hendra Rahardja, a banker whose loans to his own companies and his family's businesses were not repaid, resulting in losses of $264 million, and who died in custody in Australia during proceedings to extradite him to Indonesia.

His nephew is Rudy Kurniawan, who was convicted of counterfeiting wine.
