= Sour Grapes (2016 film) =

2016 film by Jerry Rothwell, Reuben Atlas

- Directed by: Jerry Rothwell; Reuben Atlas
- Based on: Rudy Kurniawan
- Produced by: Al Morrow; Catherine Simeon; Joshua Levine
- Starring: Laurent Ponsot; Jay McInerney; Jefery Levy; Maureen Downey; Rudy Kurniawan
- Cinematography: Simon Fanthorpe
- Edited by: James Scott
- Music by: Lionel Corsini
- Production companies: Met Film, Faites Un Voeu
- Distributed by: Dogwoof, London
- Release date: 2016
- Running time: 85 minutes
- Country: United States
- Language: English

Sour Grapes is an American crime documentary about wine fraudster Rudy Kurniawan. Filmmakers Jerry Rothwell and Reuben Atlas debuted the documentary at film festivals in October 2016 and on Netflix the following month.

== Premise ==
A documentary about the fine and rare wine auction market centering around a counterfeiter who befriended the rich and powerful and sold millions of dollars of fraudulent wine through the top auction houses.

== Cast ==
In alphabetical order; credits adapted from IMDb

- Arthur Sarkissian
- Bill Koch – businessman and collector
- Brad Goldstein – Bill Koch's spokesperson
- Corie Brown – food and wine writer, Zester Daily
- David Fredston – private equity investor, Sole Source Capital
- Don Cornwell – lawyer and burgundy wine expert
- Eddie Tansil – wanted Indonesian embezzler (archive footage), Kurniawan's uncle.
- James Wynne – FBI agent specialized in counterfeit goods (as Jim Wynne)
- Jason Hernandez – prosecutor in the Rudy Kurniawan case
- Jay McInerney – novelist and wine columnist
- Jefery Levy – Jef Levy
- Jerome Mooney – Rudy Kurniawan's defense attorney (as Jerry Mooney)
- John Kapon – wine merchant and auctioneer (archive footage)
- Laurent Ponsot – wine producer in Burgundy, France
- Maureen Downey – wine consultant
- Rajat Parr – sommelier
- Rudy Kurniawan – convicted wine counterfeiter (archive footage)
- Vincent Veridiamo – Rudy Kurniawan's defense attorney

== Synopsis ==
Rudy Kurniawan was a rich Indonesian wine collector with a fascination for Burgundy, and he spent millions of dollars on wine and also sold countless bottles of fake wine. Acker Merrall & Condit, an auction company, broke records by selling US$35 million worth of Kurniawan's wines in 2006 (equivalent to about $56M in 2025). In 2008, the firm held a sale at a Manhattan restaurant, promising the wines would be authenticated by "some of Burgundy's most discerning connoisseurs." Included were alleged bottles of Domaine Ponsot Clos Saint-Denis from the years 1945, 1949 and 1966, but an estate proprietor revealed that that particular wine had not been produced until 1982. In 2012, the Federal Bureau of Investigation raided Kurniawan's house in Arcadia, Los Angeles and discovered his wine fraud, whereby he collected empty bottles and refilled them with cheaper wine and then forged the labels. In 2014, he became the first person in the United States to be convicted of the crime, and was given a ten-year sentence by a New York federal judge. Kurniawan declined to be interviewed for the documentary.

== Reviews ==
The Hollywood Reporter stated the filmmakers "thoroughly and concisely detailed the progression of Kurniawan’s fraud in a style that merges an Antiques Roadshow-style fascination with rare wines with a Lifestyles of the Rich and Famous-type fixation on the spending habits of the overly affluent."
