= Musigny AOC =

French wine

Coordinates: 47°10′38″N 4°57′14″E

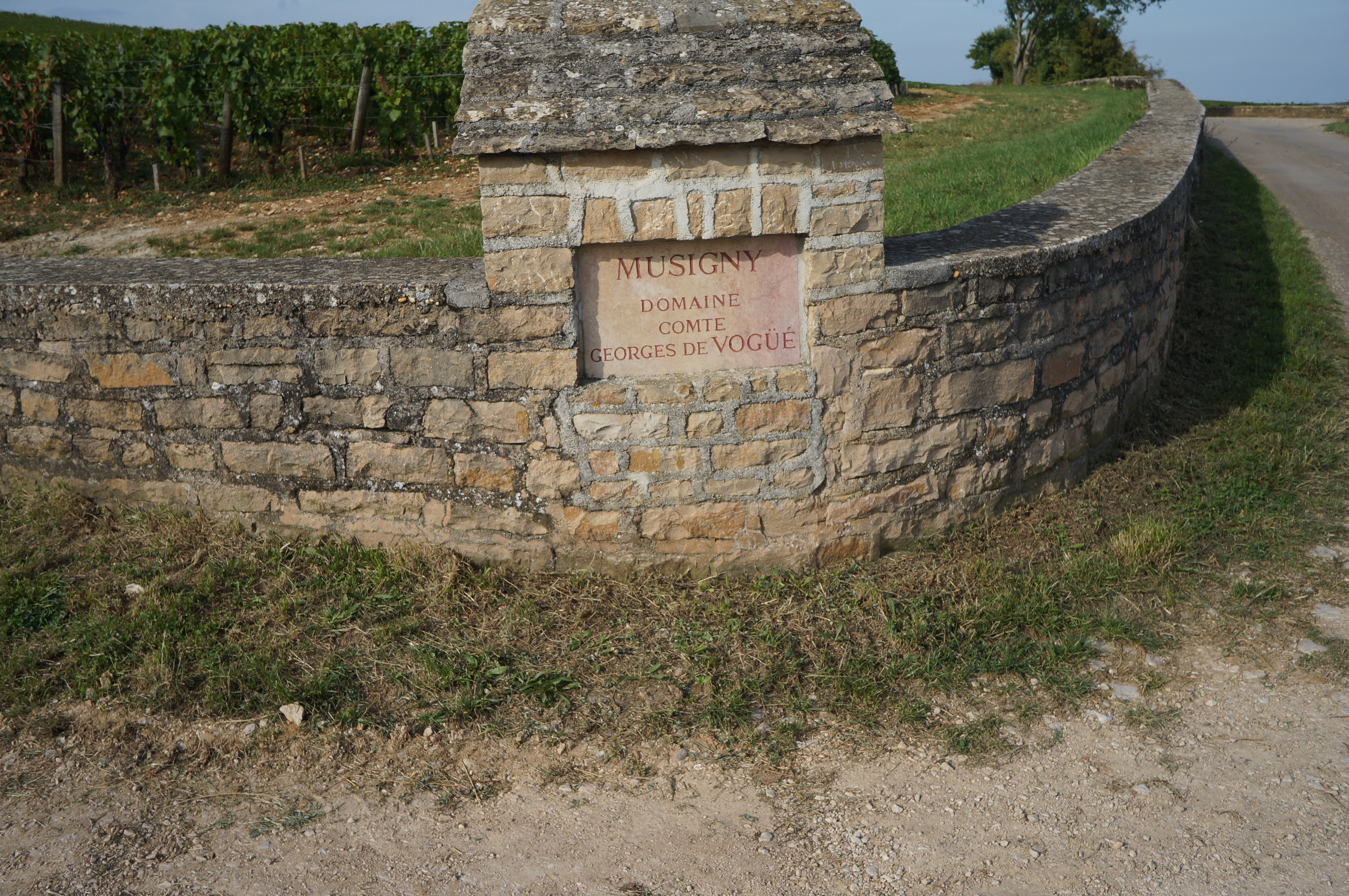
The vineyards around Vosne-Romanée (AOC) and the Côte de Nuits Vineyard of Burgundy.

Musigny, sometimes referred to as Le Musigny, is an Appellation d'origine contrôlée (AOC) and Grand Cru vineyard for red and white wine in Côte de Nuits of Burgundy. It is located within the commune of Chambolle-Musigny, to the south of the village itself. It borders on the Grand Cru Clos de Vougeot in the southeast, the Grand Cru Échezeaux in the south, and the Premier Cru Les Amoureuses in the northeast. The name is derived from a family de Musigny which is now extinct, but which held offices in the court of the Dukes of Burgundy from the 14th century. The AOC was created in 1936, but the borders of Musigny were previously set down legally in 1929.

Musigny is the only Grand Cru vineyard in Côte de Nuits that produces both white and red wines, although the production of red wine dominates by over 90 per cent. All other Burgundy Grand Crus for white wine are located in the Côte de Beaune.

== Production ==
In 2008, 10.32 hectares (25.5 acres) of vineyard surface was in production within the Musigny AOC, and 307 hectoliter of wine was produced, of which 284 hectoliter red wine and 23 hectoliter white wine. Some 0.66 hectares (1.6 acres) was used for the white wines. The amount produced corresponds to 41,000 bottles; 38,000 bottles of red wine and slightly over 3,000 bottles of white wine.

== AOC regulations ==
The main grape varieties are Pinot noir for red Musigny, and Chardonnay for white Musigny. The AOC regulations also allow up to 15 per cent total of Chardonnay, Pinot blanc and Pinot gris as accessory grapes in the red wine, but this is practically never done in any Burgundy Grand Cru wine. The allowed base yield is 35 hectoliter per hectare for red wine and 40 hl/ha for white wine, a minimum planting density of 9,000 vines per hectare is required as well as a minimum grape maturity of 11.5 per cent potential alcohol for red wine and 12.0 per cent for white wine.

== Producers ==
The top producers of Grand Cru Musigny include: Mugnier, Roumier, Vogüé, Domaine Leroy and Domaine Tawse. Vogüé is the largest producer while Leroy and Roumier make less than 300 bottles per year.

== See also ==
- List of Burgundy Grand Crus
