= Henri Leroy =

Belgian footballer (1887–1960)

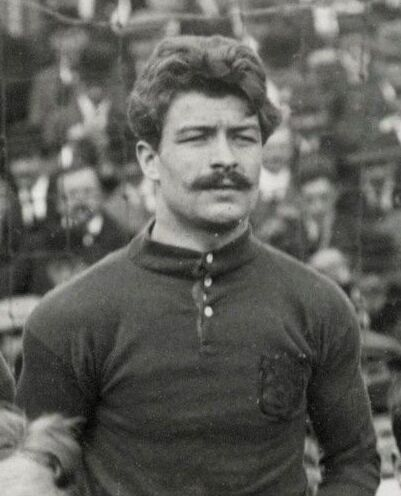

Personal information
- Date of birth: 12 December 1887
- Date of death: 17 July 1960 (aged 72)

International career
Years	Team	Apps	(Gls)
1908–1919	Belgium	18	(0)

Henri Leroy (French: [ɑ̃ʁi ləʁwa]; 12 December 1887 – 17 July 1960) was a Belgian footballer. He played in 18 matches for the Belgium national football team from 1908 to 1919.
