= Clos de Tart =

Coordinates: 47°11′43″N 4°57′45″E

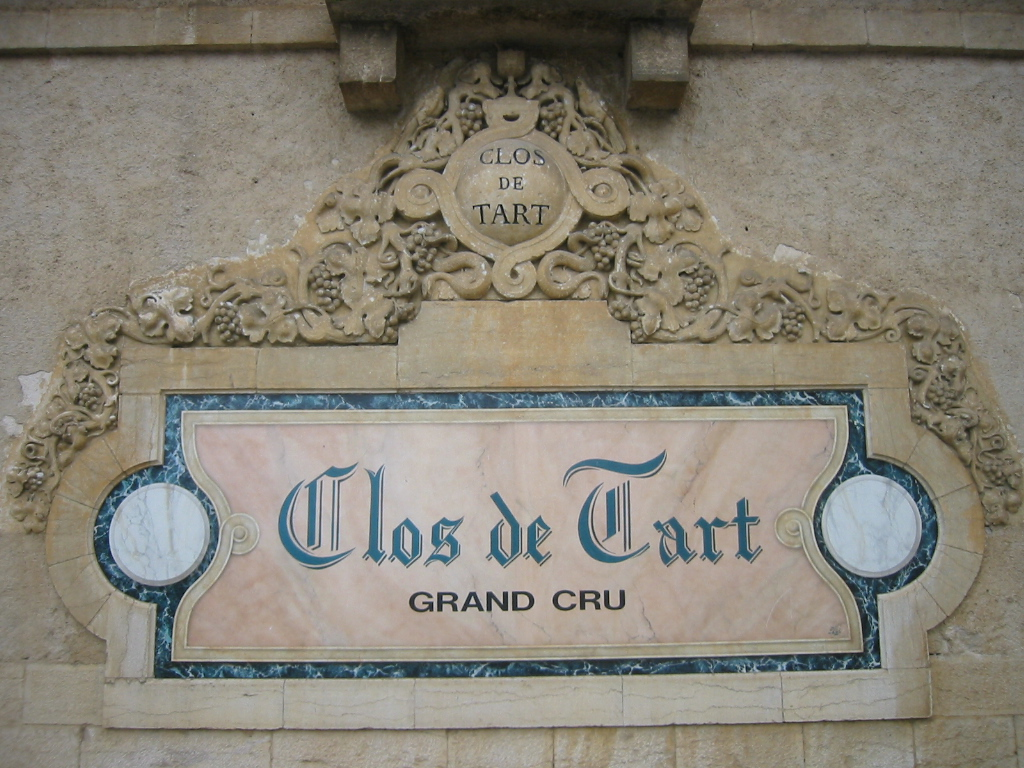
Sign at the wall bordering Clos de Tart.

Clos de Tart is an Appellation d'origine contrôlée (AOC) and Grand Cru vineyard for red wine in the Côte de Nuits subregion of Burgundy, with Pinot noir as the sole grape variety. It is situated in the commune of Morey-Saint-Denis in the Côte-d'Or département. Clos de Tart is located in the southern part of the commune, immediately west (uphill) of the village itself, and bordering the Grand Cru vineyard Bonnes Mares in the south and Clos des Lambrays in the north. The AOC was created in 1939, and the Clos part of its name refers to a wall-enclosed vineyard.

Clos de Tart is a monopole, owned in its entirety by the French holding company Groupe Artemis since its 2017 purchase from the Mommessin family. The price was not officially confirmed, but rumours estimate the transaction to €200 million.

== History ==
In 1141, Clos de Tart was sold by Maison Dieu in Brochon to the Cistercian nuns of Notre Dame de Tart. It remained owned by them until the French Revolution, at which time it was sequestered to the state and sold. The Mommessin family bought it in 1932, and they were the owners when the Clos de Tart AOC was created in 1939, which was just after the first wave of Grand Cru AOCs was defined in 1936–1937.

== Production ==
In 2008, 7.51 hectares (18.6 acres) of vineyard surface was in production within the AOC, and 218 hectoliters of wine was produced, corresponding to 29,000 bottles.

== AOC regulations ==
The sole grape variety for Clos de Tart is Pinot noir. AOC regulations allow up to 15 per cent total of Chardonnay, Pinot blanc and Pinot gris as accessory grapes, but this is practically never used for any Burgundy Grand Cru vineyard. The allowed base yield is 35 hectoliter per hectare, a minimum planting density of 9,000 vines per hectare is required as well as a minimum grape maturity of 11.5 per cent potential alcohol.

== See also ==
- List of Burgundy Grand Crus
- Tart Abbey
