= Varietal =

Wine made primarily from a single named grape variety

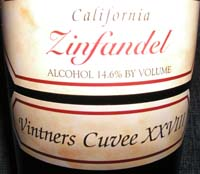
A varietal Californian wine, a Zinfandel.

A varietal wine is a wine made primarily from a single named grape variety, and which typically displays the name of that variety on the wine label. Examples of grape varieties commonly used in varietal wines are Cabernet Sauvignon, Chardonnay and Merlot. Wines that display the name of two or more varieties on their label, such as a Chardonnay-Viognier, are blends and not varietal wines. The term is frequently misused in place of vine variety; the term variety refers to the vine or grape, while varietal refers to the wine produced by a variety.

The term was popularized in the US by Maynard Amerine at the University of California, Davis after Prohibition seeking to encourage growers to choose optimal vine varieties, and later promoted by Frank Schoonmaker in the 1950s and 1960s, ultimately becoming widespread during the California wine boom of the 1970s. Varietal wines are commonly associated with New World wines in general, but there is also a long-standing tradition of varietal labelling in Germany and other German-influenced wine regions including Austria, Alsace, and the Czech Republic.

== Marketing relevance ==
The alternatives to the marketing differentiation of wines by grape variety are branded wine, such as Hearty Burgundy, or geographical appellations, such as Champagne or Bordeaux. The poor quality and unknown provenance of many branded wines and the multitude of potentially confusing appellations leaves varietal labeling as perhaps the most popular for quality wines in many markets. This is much less the case in places where appellations have a long and strong tradition, as for instance in France. In the past, the grape variety was very uncommonly mentioned on the labels of French wine bottles, and was forbidden for almost all AOC wines. New World varietal wines from newcomers like Australia and Chile have made a significant dent in traditional French export markets like the UK, and so the French are adopting varietal labeling in some cases, particularly for vin de pays.

== Australia ==
Australia has virtually completed a three decade long transition from labelling by style, e.g. "claret", "burgundy", "hock", "chablis" to a varietal system. While this has been done in response to pressure from the EU, particularly France, it has paved the way for growing interest among Australian consumers for so called alternative varietals, such as Pinot grigio / (Pinot gris), Sangiovese and Tempranillo.

== Europe ==
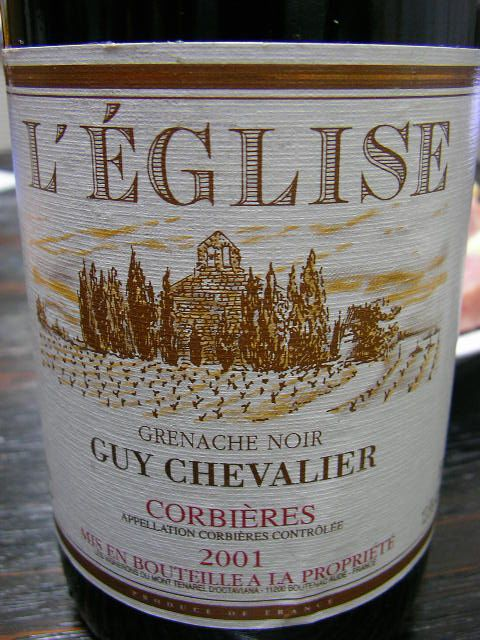
French estate bottled wine from the Corbières AOC in the Languedoc-Roussillon that features the grape variety Grenache noir on the label. Unique for French wines

Within the European Union, a wine using a varietal label must contain at least 85% of that variety. 85% is a common minimum standard; national regulations may set the limit higher in certain cases, but not lower.

=== France ===
In most regions of France, terroir is thought to surpass the impact of variety, so almost all French wines traditionally have no variety listed at all, and would in many cases not be allowed for AOC wines. Champagne, for instance, is typically a blend of Chardonnay, Pinot noir and Pinot Meunier, but this is not indicated anywhere on the label. In Alsace, winemakers adopt the German custom of varietal labeling.

In recent years, varietal labels have become more common for French wines. Most of these wines are Vin de pays rather than AOC wines, but varietal names are also seen on some regional AOCs.

== United States ==
In the United States, the Alcohol and Tobacco Tax and Trade Bureau regulations specify a minimum variety content of 75% of the labeled grape, for Vitis vinifera wines, and 51% for Vitis labrusca wines. There is no restriction on the identity of the balance. Many states in the United States require specific compositions to qualify for sale under a particular varietal labels. For example, in Oregon, wines subject to its regulation must be identified by the grape variety from which it was made, and certain varietals must contain at least 95% of that variety, although the new "Southern Oregon" sub-AVA allows for the minimum 75% figure.

== See also ==
- International variety
- List of grape varieties
