= Bonnes Mares =

Coordinates: 47°11′31″N 4°57′29″E

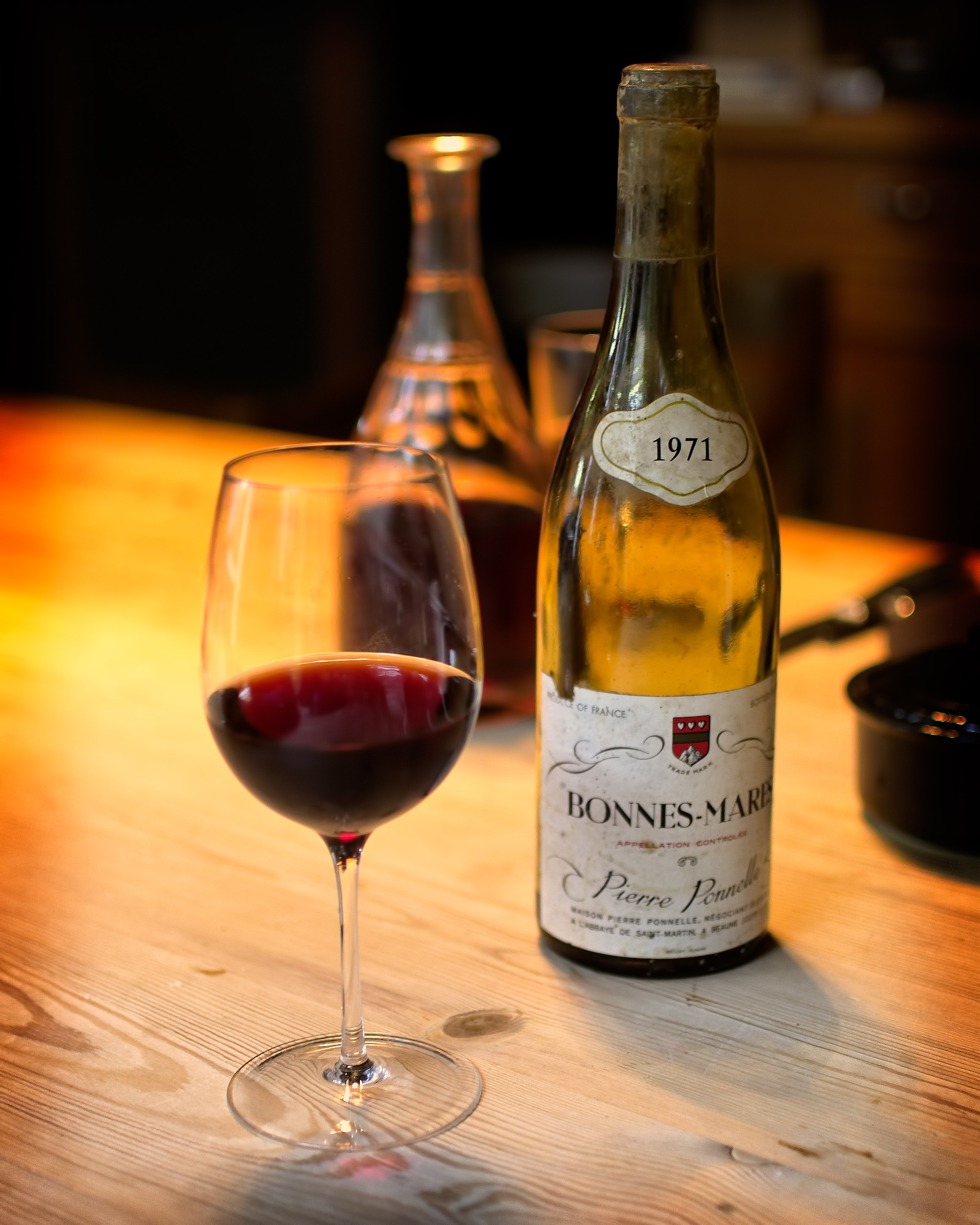
A 1971 bottle and glass of Pierre Ponnelle Bonnes-Mares.

Bonnes Mares is an Appellation d'origine contrôlée (AOC) and Grand Cru vineyard for red wine in the Côte de Nuits subregion of Burgundy, with Pinot noir as the main grape variety. The AOC was created in 1936. It is shared between the two communes of Chambolle-Musigny (where the main part is located) and Morey-Saint-Denis in the Côte-d'Or département. Bonnes Mares is located a little to the north of the Chambolle-Musigny village, and borders the Route des Grands Crus in the east and the Grand Cru vineyard Clos de Tart in the north.

In 2008, 16.24 hectares (40.1 acres) of vineyard surface was in production within the AOC, and 522 hectoliter of wine was produced, corresponding to 70,000 bottles.

== History ==
The origin of the vineyard's name is unknown, although it is known to have been used since the High Medieval period, and at least three different hypotheses exist. The most commonly prevailing assumption is that it may come from the bonnes mères ("good mothers"), nuns of the Cistercian order at Notre-Dame de Tart. A second hypothesis holds that it originates in the verb marer, to cultivate, which would give a translation of "good vintage". The third hypothesis, favored by the Drouhin family, is based on the myth of a winegrower who is said to have unearthed in this vineyard a sculpture representing three goddesses of fecundity, the bonnes mères.

== AOC regulations ==
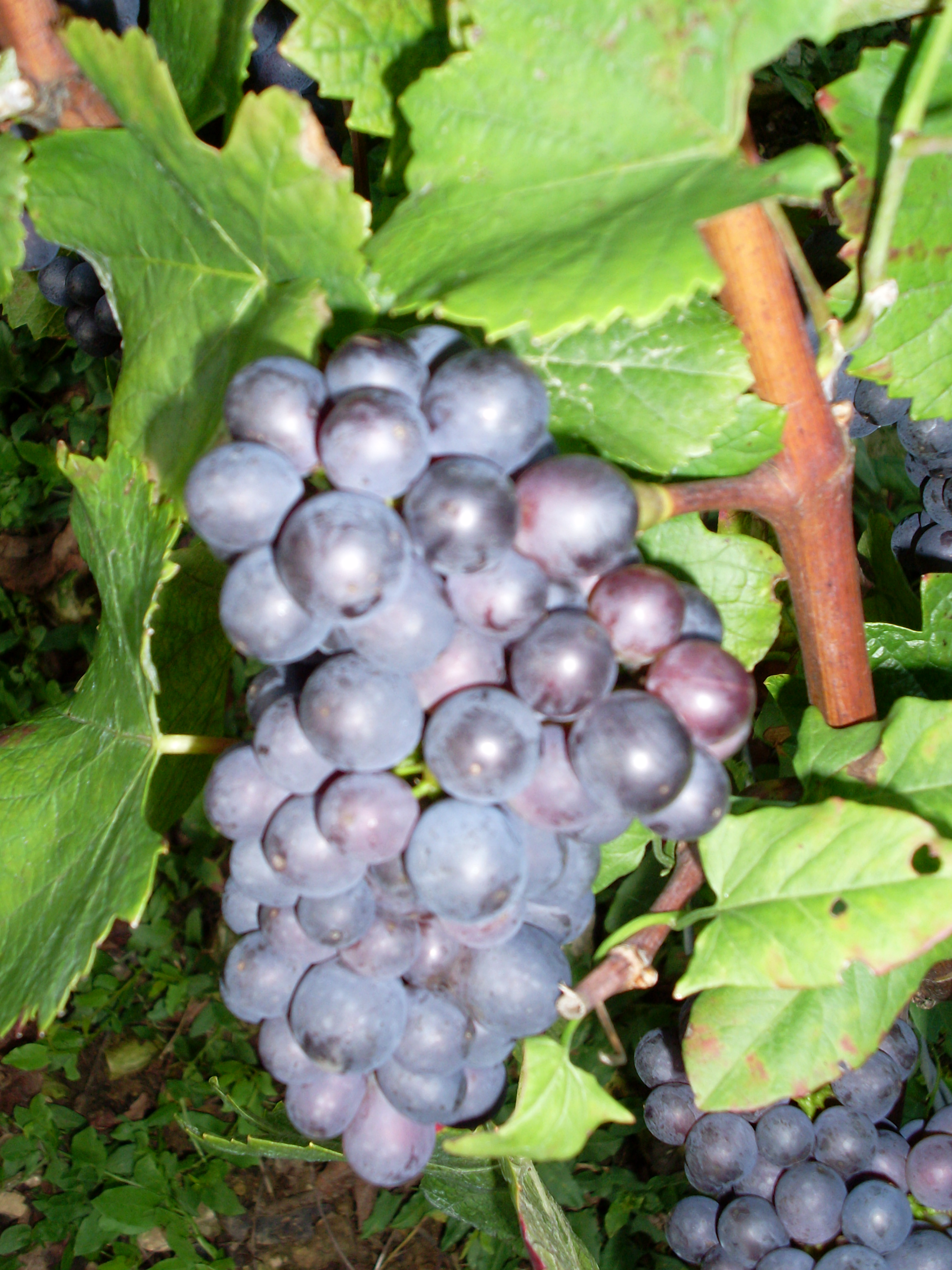
Pinot noir grapes.

The main grape variety for Bonnes Mares is Pinot Noir. The AOC regulations also allow up to 15 per cent total of Chardonnay, Pinot blanc and Pinot gris as accessory grapes, but this is practically never used for any Burgundy Grand Cru vineyard. The allowed base yield is 35 hectoliter per hectare, a minimum planting density of 9,000 vines per hectare is required as well as a minimum grape maturity of 11.5 per cent potential alcohol.

== Wine style ==
The style of Bonnes Mares wine is in general full-bodied and tannic. A difference in soil types over the length of the vineyard is often reflected in the style of wines, which can be either more in the style of Morey-Saint-Denis wine or in the style of Chambolle-Musigny wine, meaning lighter and more elegant.

== See also ==
- List of Burgundy Grand Crus
