= Clos de la Roche =

Coordinates: 47°12′13″N 4°57′45″E

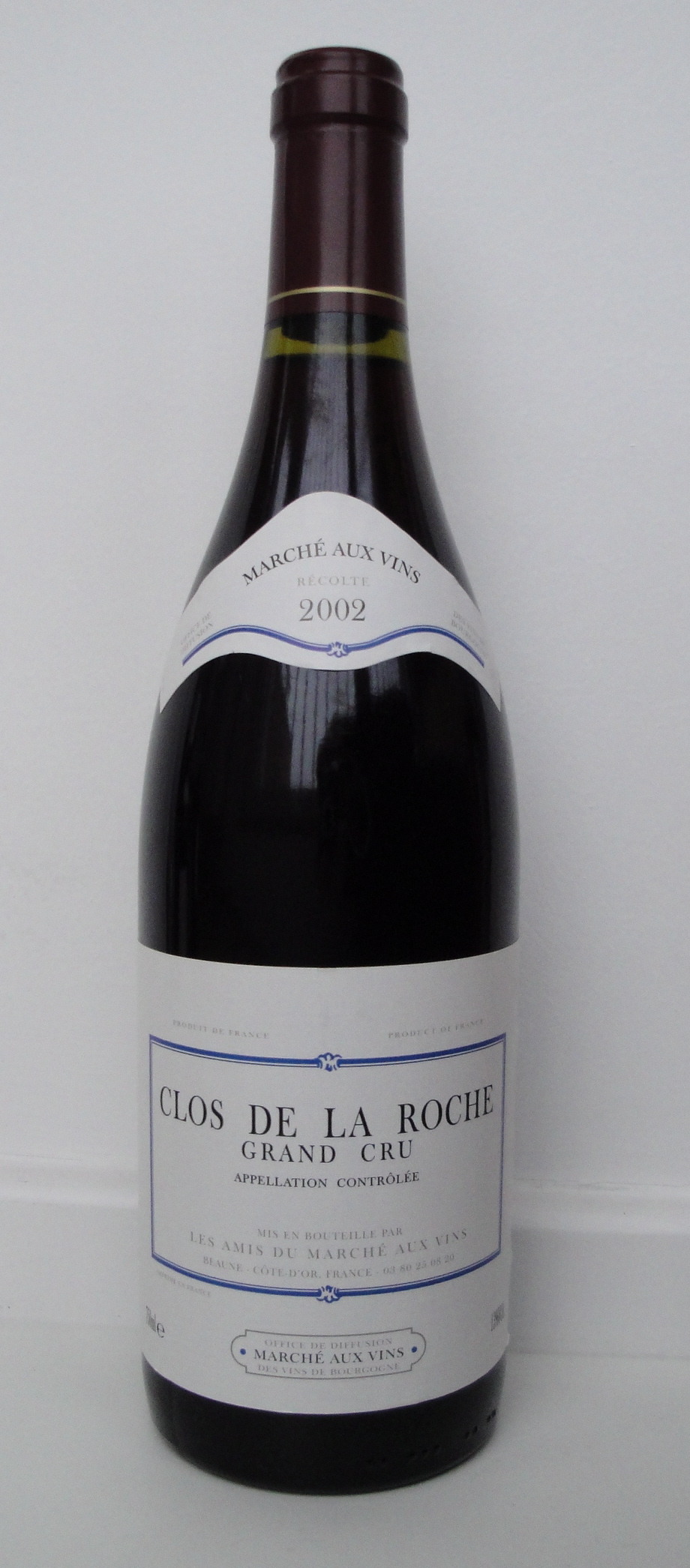
A bottle of Clos de la Roche wine.

Clos de la Roche is an Appellation d'origine contrôlée for red wine in the Côte de Nuits subregion of Burgundy, with Pinot noir as the main grape variety. It is situated in the commune of Morey-Saint-Denis in the Côte-d'Or département. Clos de la Roche is located in the northern part of the commune, stretches to the border of Gevrey-Chambertin, and borders to the Grand Cru vineyard Clos Saint-Denis in the south. It borders the Route des Grands Crus in the east. The AOC was created in 1936, and the Clos part of its name refers to a wall-enclosed vineyard.

== Production ==
In 2008, 13.41 hectares (33.1 acres) of vineyard surface was in production within the AOC, and 448 hectolitres (44,800 L) of wine was produced, corresponding to just over 59,733 bottles.

The largest landholder in Clos de la Roche is Domaine Ponsot, who own 3 of the original 4 hectares of the vineyard, which has since been expanded to the current 13.41 hectares. In 2008, they produced 108.6075 hectoliters of wine under the Clos de la Roche Grand Cru AOC.

== AOC regulations ==
The main grape variety for Clos de la Roche is Pinot noir. The AOC regulations also allow up to 15 per cent total of Chardonnay, Pinot blanc and Pinot gris as accessory grapes, but this is practically never used for any Burgundy Grand Cru vineyard. The allowed base yield is 35 hectoliter per hectare, a minimum planting density of 9,000 vines per hectare is required as well as a minimum grape maturity of 11.5 per cent potential alcohol.

== See also ==
- List of Burgundy Grand Crus
