= Chambolle-Musigny =

- Commune
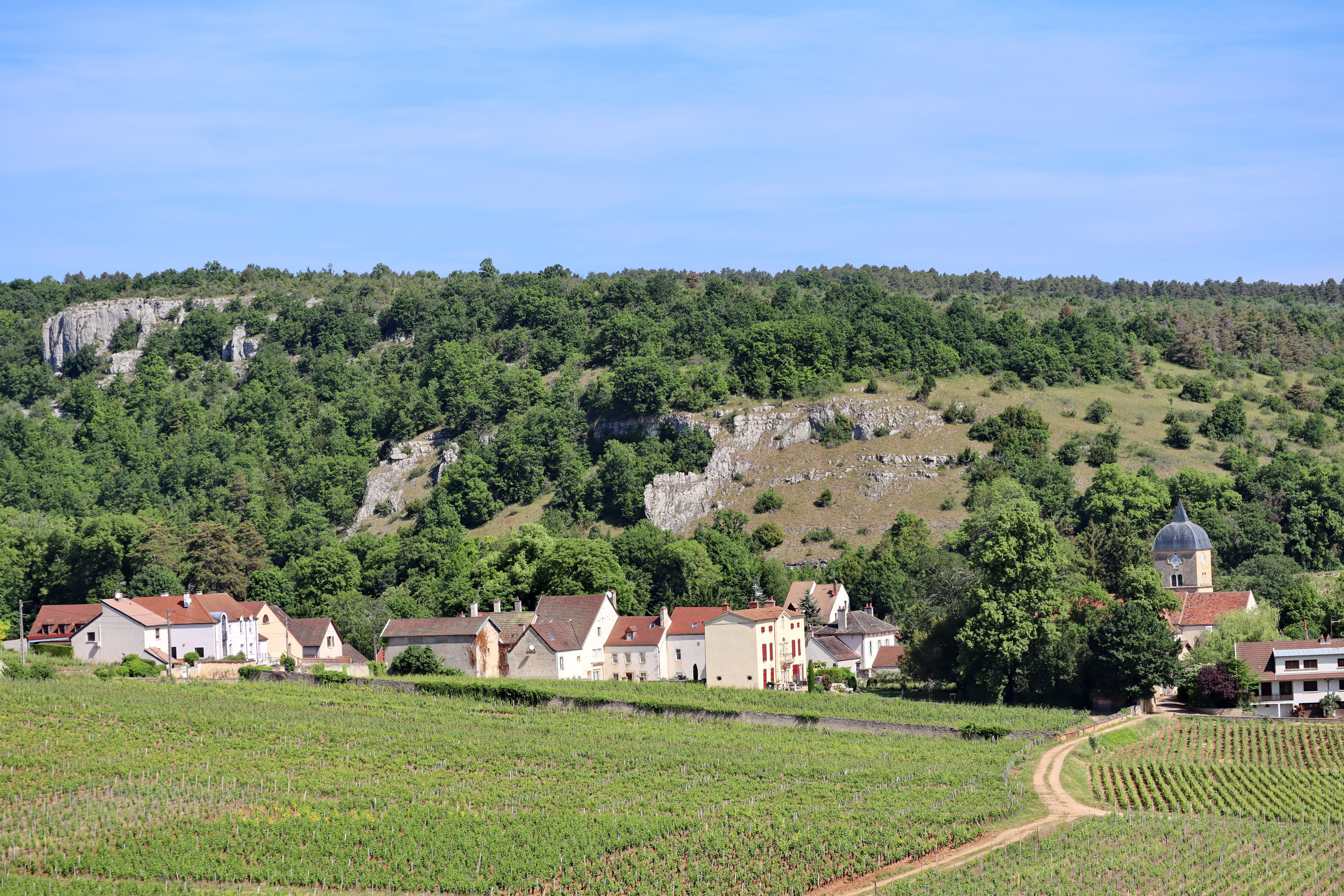

- Coat of arms
- Location of Chambolle-Musigny
- Location within France Location within Bourgogne-Franche-Comté
- Coordinates: 47°11′11″N 4°57′12″E
- Country: France
- Region: Bourgogne-Franche-Comté
- Department: Côte-d'Or
- Arrondissement: Beaune
- Canton: Longvic

Government
  - Mayor (2020–2026): François Marquet
- Area^{1}: 7.57 km^{2} (2.92 sq mi)
- Elevation: 264 m (866 ft)
- Highest elevation: 445 m (1,460 ft)
- Lowest elevation: 238 m (781 ft)
- Population (2023): 264
  - Density: 34.9/km^{2} (90.3/sq mi)
- Time zone: UTC+01:00 (CET)
  - Summer (DST): UTC+02:00 (CEST)
- INSEE/Postal code: 21133 /21220
- ^{1} French Land Register data, which excludes lakes, ponds, glaciers > 1 km^{2} (0.386 sq mi or 247 acres) and river estuaries.

Chambolle-Musigny (French pronunciation: [ʃɑ̃bɔl myziɲi]) is a commune in the Côte-d'Or département in eastern France.

It is one of the wine villages situated on the Côte-d'Or escarpment, and is one of the twelve Côte d'Or communes of France which added or adopted the name of their best-known vineyard as a suffix to the original name of the village.

== Population ==
Historical population
Year	Pop.	±% p.a.
1968	455	—
1975	403	−1.72%
1982	364	−1.44%
1990	355	−0.31%
1999	313	−1.39%
2007	307	−0.24%
2012	311	+0.26%
2017	295	−1.05%
2023	264	−1.83%
Source: INSEE

== Wine ==
Wine and viticulture is the main business of Chambolle-Musigny. The village name is an Appellation d'origine contrôlée (AOC) for red wine with Pinot noir as the main grape. There are also 25 vineyards classified as Chambolle-Musigny Premier Cru, the most famous of these Les Amoureuses, and two Grand Cru vineyards: Musigny and Bonnes Mares. It is Musigny which has lent its name to the village as a suffix. The trend of adding a vineyard name as a suffix started in 1847 by Gevrey successfully applying to the king to add Chambertin as a suffix to its name. This trend started off as a result of a clever marketing strategy to be able to use the name of the most famous vineyard also as part of the name of simpler wines from the same village. Thus, Chambolle became Chambolle-Musigny in 1882.

Towering high above the other vineyards stands Le Musigny, a 10.86 hectare piece of land owned and exploited by no fewer than ten different wine producers. Producers include Domaine Comte Georges de Vogue, Domaine Georges Roumier, Domaine Leroy, Domaine J.-F. Mugnier, Maison Louis Jadot and Maison Joseph Drouhin. It is most famously described as "the queen of all Burgundy" and "an iron fist in a velvet glove". Classed as a Grand Cru vineyard, it is one of two such classed vineyards on the commune.

The other is the majority of Les Bonnes Mares. 13.54 hectare lie in Chambolle with a further 1.52 hectare technically within neighboring Morey-Saint-Denis (which like Chambolle adopted the name of one of its four Grands Crus, Saint-Denis). Bonnes Mares is generally considered to be firmer and more tannic. Most producers of Musigny also happen to own or exploit land in Bonnes Mares.

There are two dozen Premier Cru vineyards, most at least of good quality. One bears special mention, however. Les Amoureuses, a small 5.4 hectare Premier Cru climate and is considered better than the other 23 Premiers Crus. It is generally considered to be a very close sibling to Musigny itself, with perhaps less longevity and less all-out power; but one which is closer in style to Musigny than Bonnes Mares. The wines tend to be very expensive like a Grand Cru as well and most producers blessed enough to own a parcel of this tiny vineyard enjoy high incomes.

== Photo gallery ==
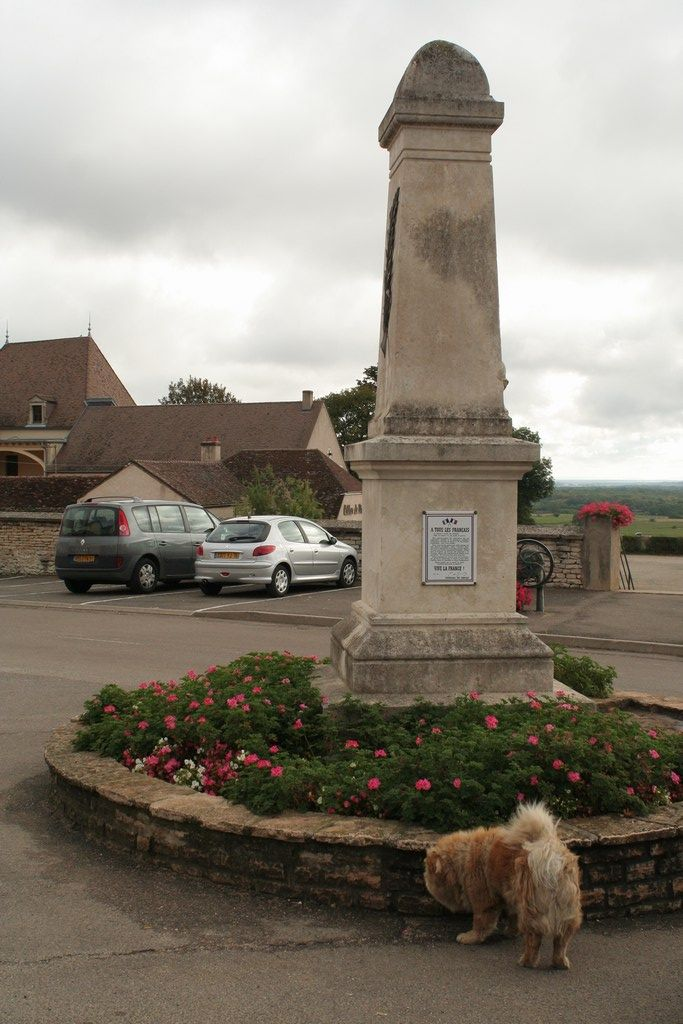
War memorial, with a message from Charles De Gaulle.

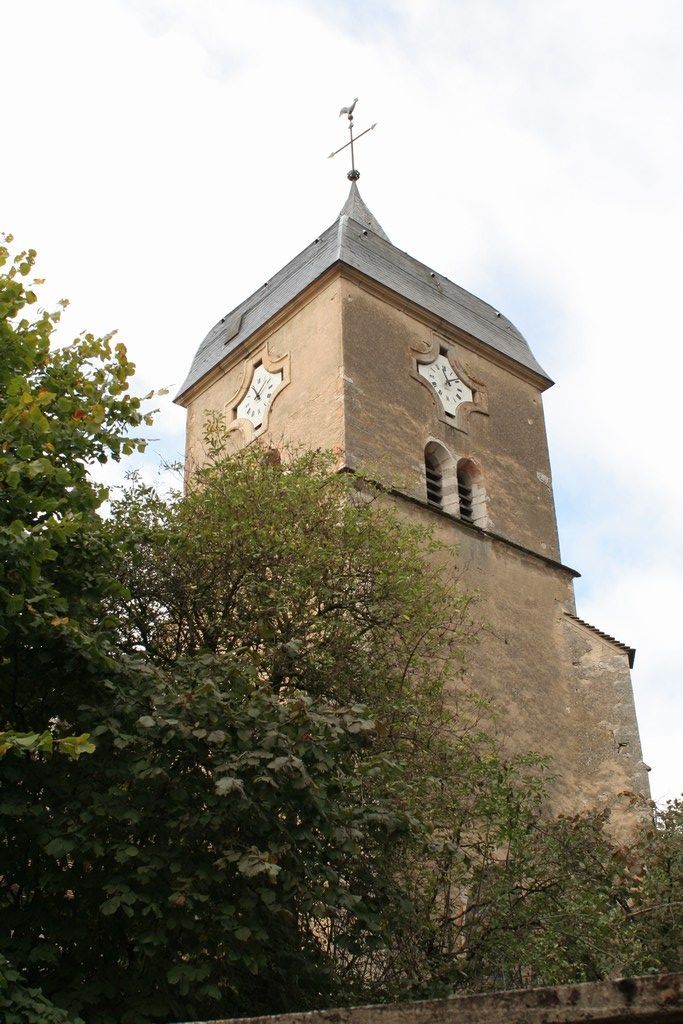
Eglise Ste Barbe

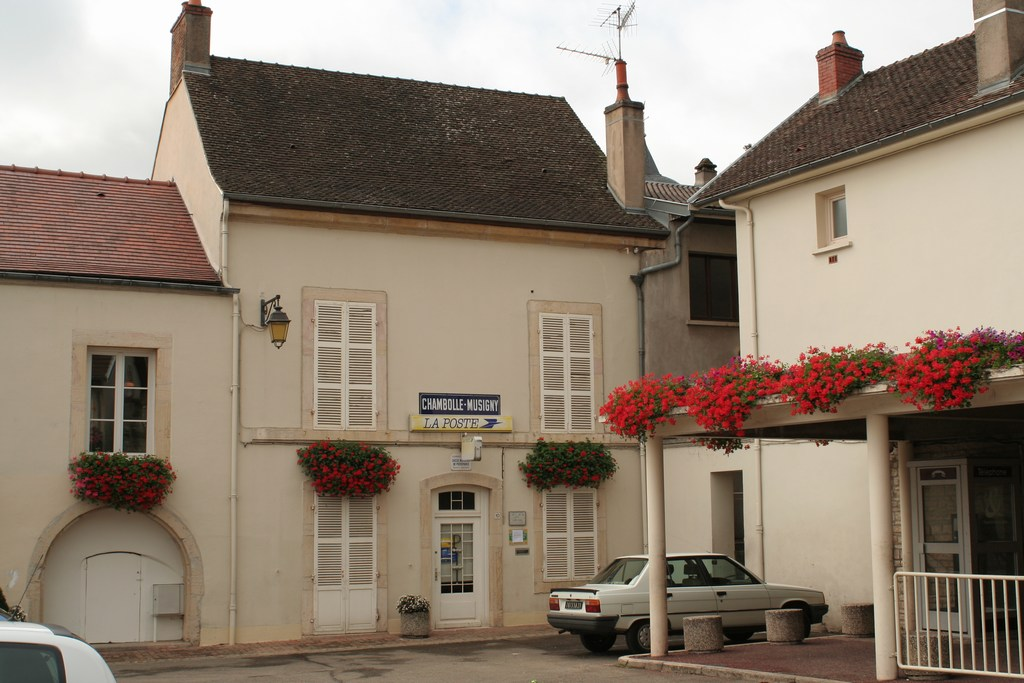
The post office

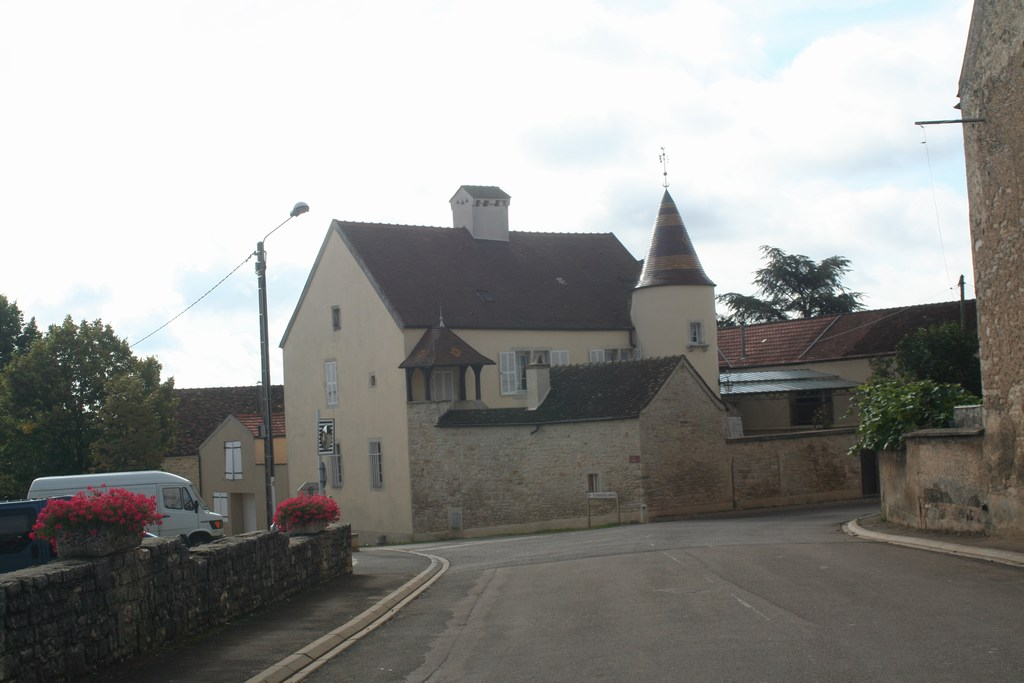
In Chambolle-Musigny

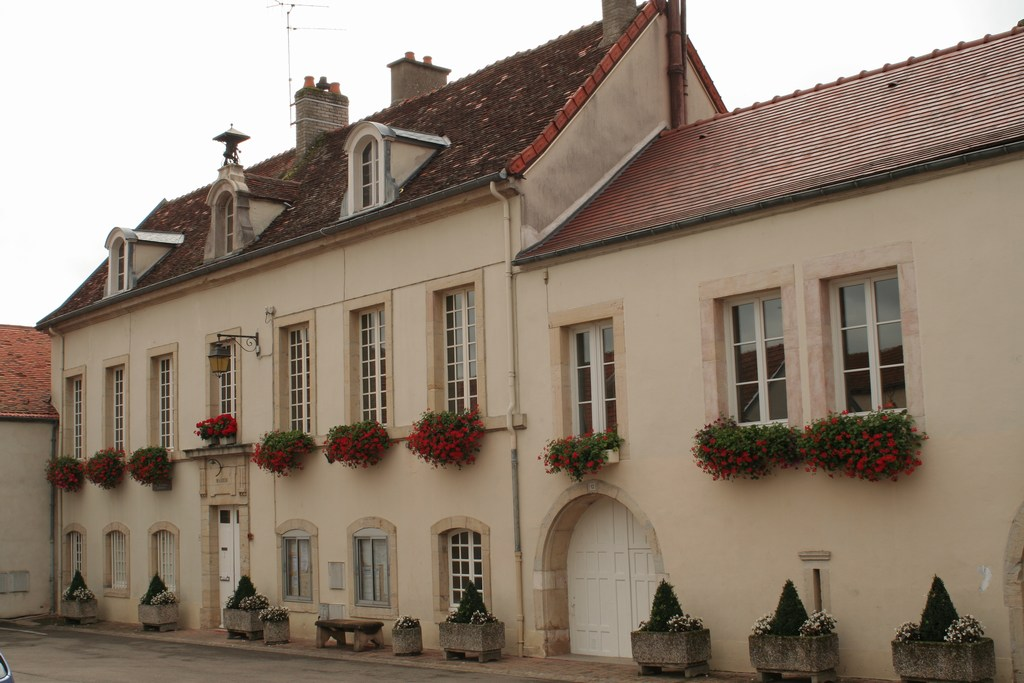
The school and mairie beside the post office.

== International relations ==
Chambolle-Musigny is twinned with:

- Schwabenheim an der Selz, Germany

Sister City with:

- Sonoma, California, United States

== See also ==
- French wine
- Route des Grands Crus
