= Clos Saint-Denis =

Coordinates: 47°12′04″N 4°57′42″E

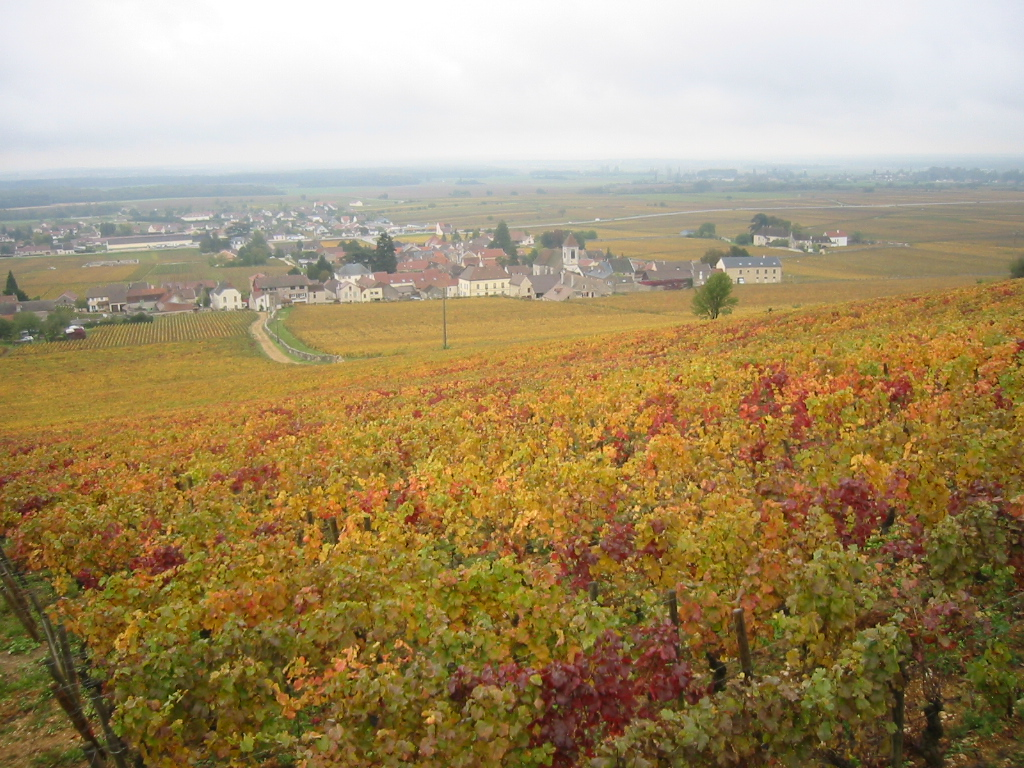
View of Morey-Saint-Denis over Clos Saint-Denis.

Clos Saint-Denis is an Appellation d'origine contrôlée (AOC) and Grand Cru vineyard for red wine in the Côte de Nuits subregion of Burgundy, with Pinot noir as the main grape variety. It is situated in the commune of Morey-Saint-Denis in the Côte-d'Or département. Clos de la Roche is located just to the north of the village Morey-Saint-Denis (which has borrowed its name from the vineyard) and borders to the Grand Cru vineyard Clos de la Roche in the north. The AOC was created in 1936, and the Clos part of its name refers to a wall-enclosed vineyard.

== History ==
Clos Saint-Denis was originally a church-owned vineyard, belonging to the Collégiale de St-Denis de Vergy, named after Saint Denis.

== Production ==
In 2008, 5.99 hectares (14.8 acres) of vineyard surface was in production within the AOC, and 200 hectoliter of wine was produced, corresponding to just under 27,000 bottles.

== AOC regulations ==
The main grape variety for Clos Saint-Denis is Pinot noir. The AOC regulations also allow up to 15 per cent total of Chardonnay, Pinot blanc and Pinot gris as accessory grapes, but this is practically never used for any Burgundy Grand Cru vineyard. The allowed base yield is 35 hectoliter per hectare, a minimum planting density of 9,000 vines per hectare is required as well as a minimum grape maturity of 11.5 per cent potential alcohol.

== See also ==
- List of Burgundy Grand Crus
