= Morey-Saint-Denis =

- Commune
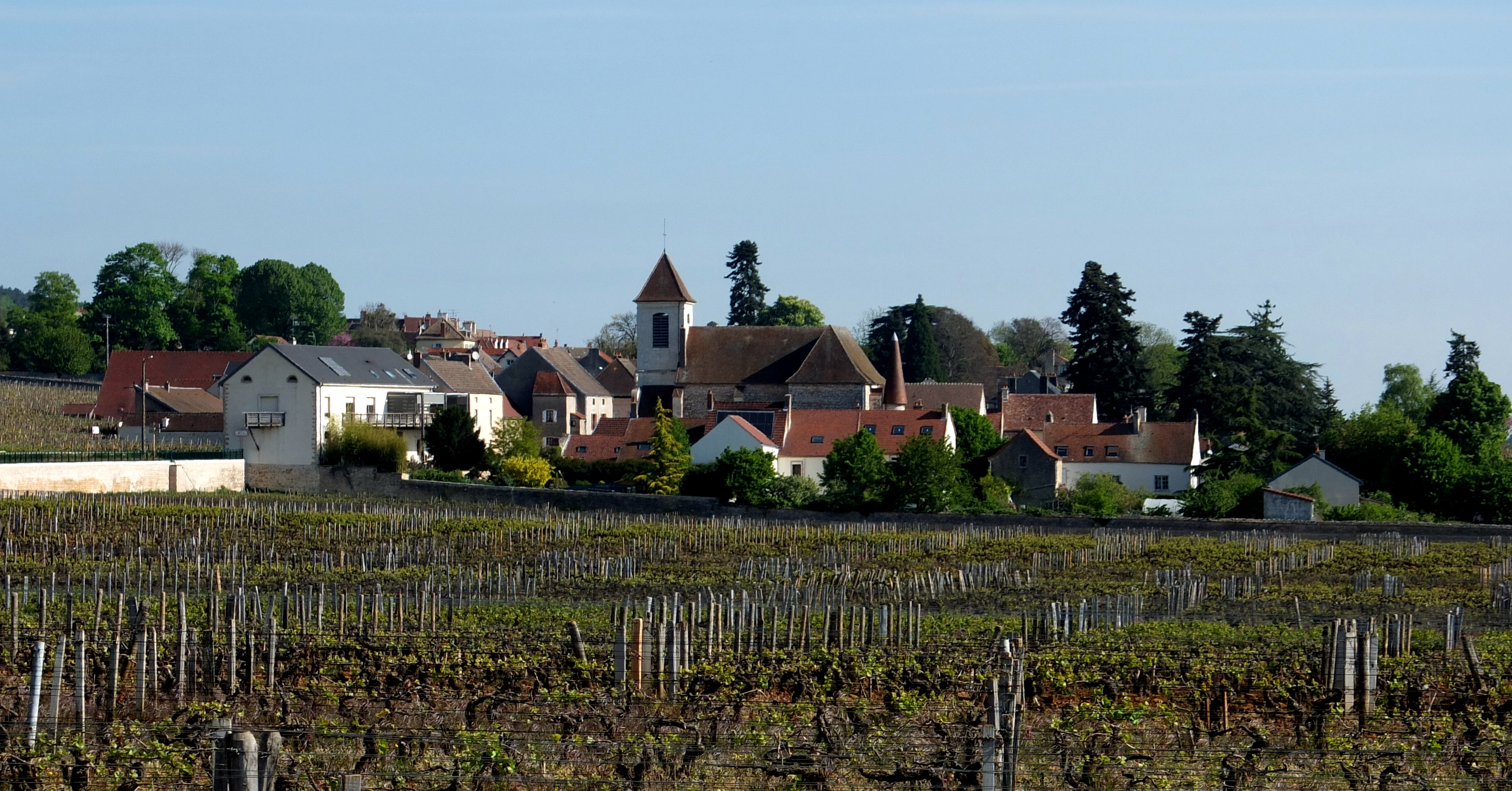
- A general view of Morey-Saint-Denis

- Coat of arms
- Location of Morey-Saint-Denis
- Location within France Location within Bourgogne-Franche-Comté
- Coordinates: 47°11′47″N 4°57′51″E
- Country: France
- Region: Bourgogne-Franche-Comté
- Department: Côte-d'Or
- Arrondissement: Beaune
- Canton: Longvic
- Intercommunality: Gevrey-Chambertin et Nuits-Saint-Georges

Government
  - Mayor (2024–2026): Gérard Tardy
- Area^{1}: 7.83 km^{2} (3.02 sq mi)
- Highest elevation: 472 m (1,549 ft)
- Lowest elevation: 222 m (728 ft)
- Population (2023): 597
  - Density: 76.2/km^{2} (197/sq mi)
- Time zone: UTC+01:00 (CET)
  - Summer (DST): UTC+02:00 (CEST)
- INSEE/Postal code: 21442 /21220
- ^{1} French Land Register data, which excludes lakes, ponds, glaciers > 1 km^{2} (0.386 sq mi or 247 acres) and river estuaries.

Morey-Saint-Denis (French pronunciation: [mɔʁɛ sɛ̃ dəni]) is a commune in the Côte-d'Or department in eastern France.

== Population ==
Historical population
Year	Pop.	±% p.a.
1968	740	—
1975	718	−0.43%
1982	653	−1.35%
1990	639	−0.27%
1999	673	+0.58%
2007	696	+0.42%
2012	688	−0.23%
2017	666	−0.65%
2023	597	−1.81%
Source: INSEE

== Wine ==
Morey-Saint-Denis is situated in the Northern section of the Côte d'Or called Côte de Nuits. It is one of the principal wine producing villages of the region.

Within Morey-Saint-Denis there are five Grand Cru appellations and 20 Premier Cru vineyards. The Bonnes Mares appellation straddles the border between Morey-Saint-Denis and Chambolle-Musigny and therefore can be produced in either commune.

=== Grand Cru appellations ===
- Clos de Tart
- Bonnes Mares
- Clos de la Roche
- Clos Saint-Denis
- Clos des Lambrays

=== Premier Cru vineyards ===
- Les Genevrières
- Monts Luisants
- Les Chaffots
- Clos Baulet
- Les Blanchards
- Les Gruenchers
- La Riotte
- Les Millandes
- Les Faconnières
- Les Charrières
- Clos des Ormes
- Aux Charmes
- Aux Cheseaux
- Les Chenevery
- Le Village
- Les Sorbés
- Clos Sorbé
- La Bussière
- Les Ruchots

== See also ==
- Communes of the Côte-d'Or department
- Route des Grands Crus
