= Pomo (disambiguation) =

The Pomo are an Indigenous People of California.

Pomo may also refer to:

- Pomo languages, a language family of the Pomo People
- the Pomo dialect of the Pol language, spoken in the Republic of the Congo
- Pomo religion, religion of the Pomo People
- Pomo, California, an unincorporated community
- Postmodernism, often shortened to po-mo or pomo
- Permanent open market operations, the buying and selling of government bonds
- Abbreviated name of Port Moody, British Columbia
- Acronym for "Physically Out, Mentally Out", used by former Jehovah's Witnesses to describe their status as ex-members
