= Fully feathered basket =

Basket-ware made in Northern California

California tribes and languages at contact

A fully feathered basket is a type of basket crafted by a select group of Indigenous people of California who have traditionally resided in the coastal region of Northern California above San Francisco. The baskets are distinguished by the matted layer of feathers, which completely cover the exterior of the basket. They are highly collectible and renowned for their fine craftsmanship.

== Background ==
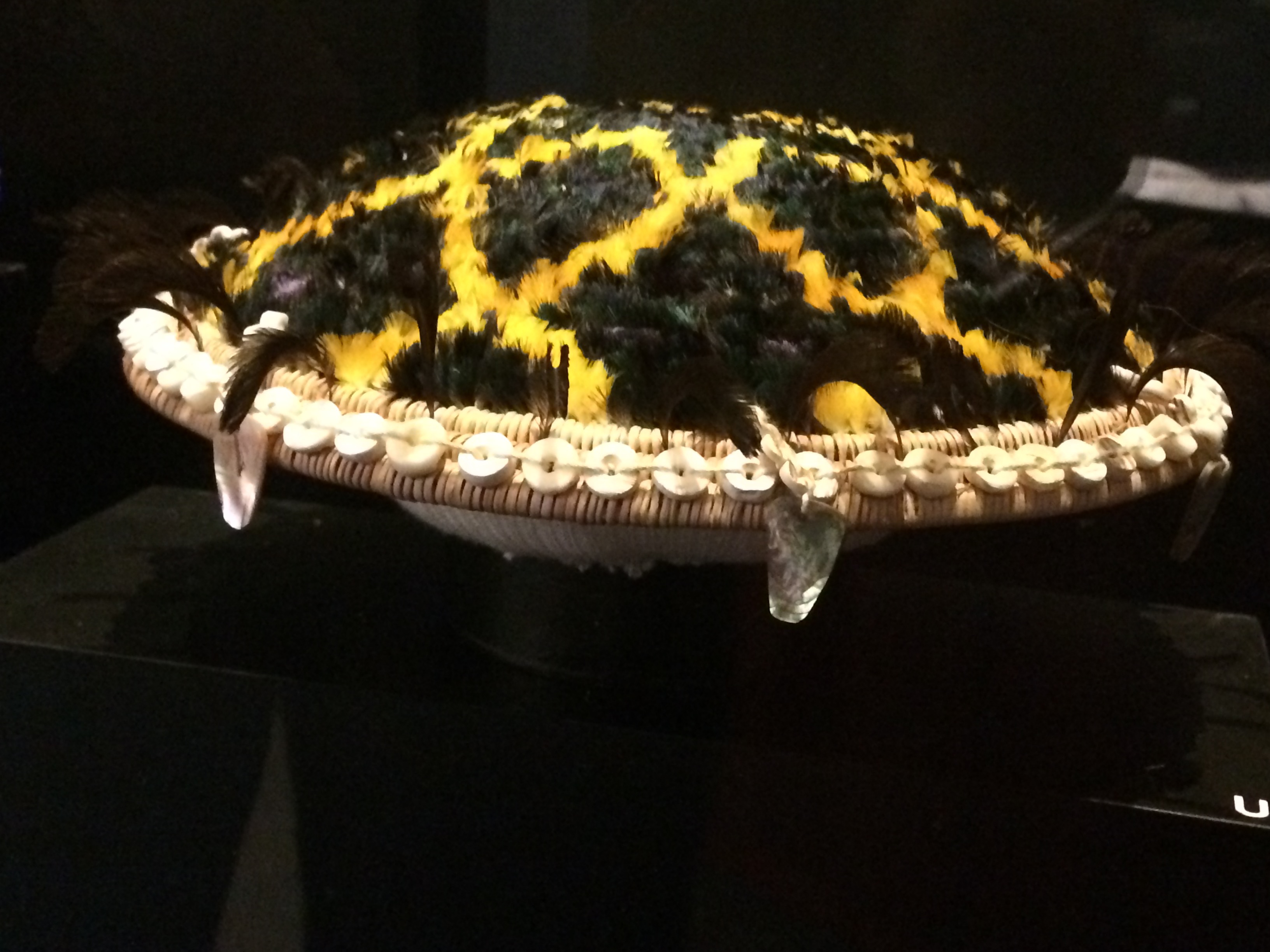
Pomo fully feathered basket

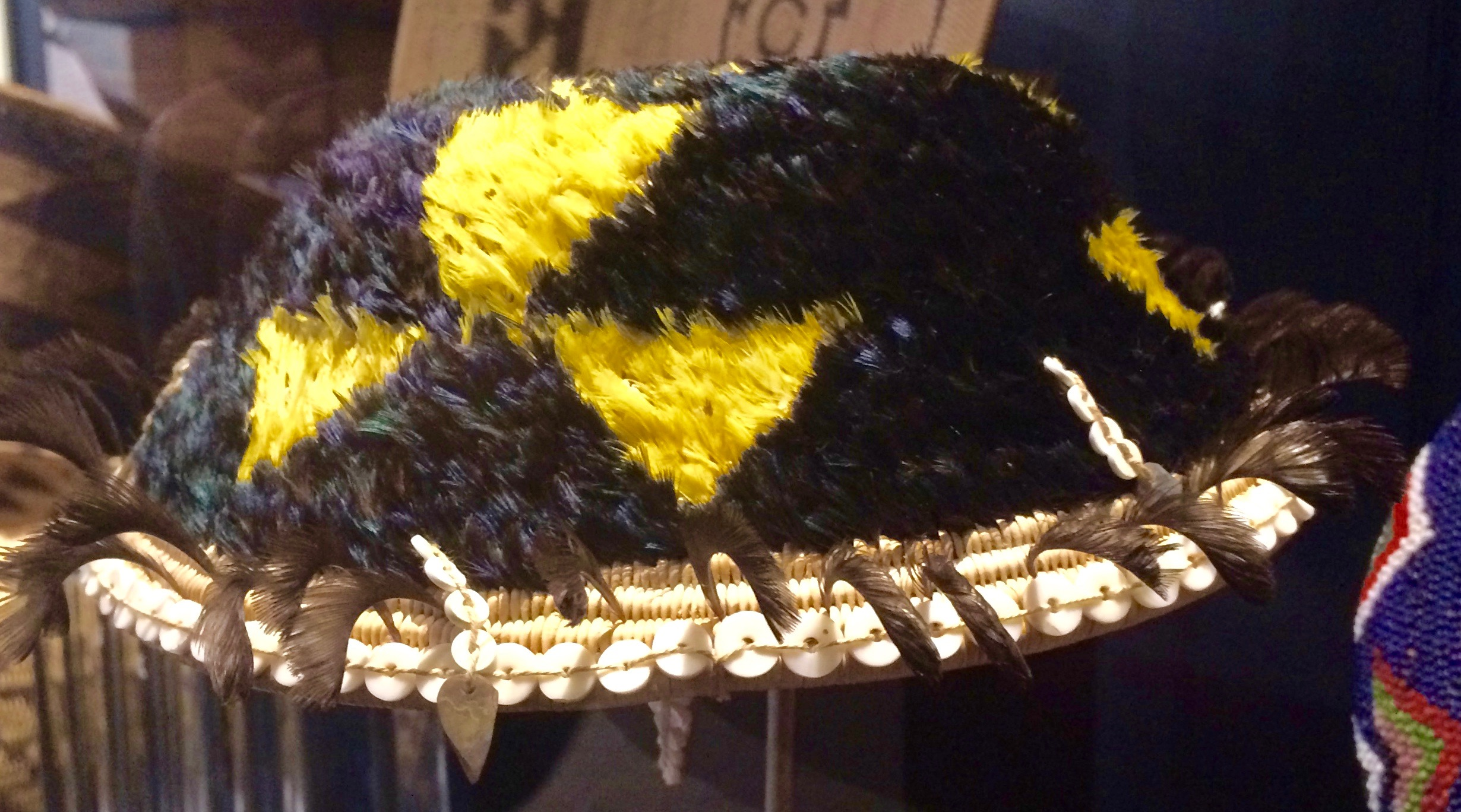
Fully feathered basket curated at Santa Rosa College

Fully feathered baskets are a type of traditional basket, crafted by Indigenous tribes of California. They feature a matted layer of feathers which covers the exterior surface of the basket. They may be adorned with beads and hanging pendants. These baskets represent the artists' culture and their technical and aesthetic virtuosity, and are the subject of worldwide respect.

Fully feathered baskets were made by only an exclusive few Northern California tribes: Pomo, Coast Miwok, Wappo, Patwin, and Lake Miwok. The skills necessary to master such basket making are taught and developed under a long apprenticeship, usually within a family, with one generation passing the knowledge to the next. Although the tribes produce other baskets, the fully feathered baskets are probably best known, due to the colored, iridescent feathers incorporated onto the exterior surfaces.

Sometimes the baskets produced by one tribe were indistinguishable from those made by those of another tribe. Some fully feathered baskets have small, distinguishing features which suggests a specific tribal heritage. Fully feathered baskets were very personal items, often given as a gift and destroyed at the death of the owner. This ritual destruction contributed to the rarity of the baskets. Additionally, some tribes were subjected to the Spanish Mission process which destroyed much of their culture, including the basketry. An additional threat to baskets which survived into the 20th century was that fully feathered baskets were confiscated by government agents due to laws restricting the possession of certain types of bird feathers.

== Construction ==
With some rare exception of men making these baskets, traditionally, women were the creators of fully feathered baskets. Not all weavers would make feathered baskets while others much preferred fully feathered baskets and only made other basket types when feathers were unavailable. Weavers would often adhere to certain rules when making baskets. This served to affirm their place in the world and their responsibility to the plants and each other. For example, weavers would not work on baskets when they were unhappy. Some would fast before gathering and pray when gathering any of the necessary materials. Julia F. Parker said, "We take from the earth and say please. We give back to the earth and say thank you." If their menstruation cycle began while making a basket, some women wove flicker quills into their baskets. Except for this momentary situation, women did not make baskets while experiencing this cycle. Special breaks, called daus, were woven by some basket makers. These breaks served as a portal allowing the basket spirit to inspect the basket.

The baskets were woven with natural plant materials and then feathers were incorporated which matted and covered the entire exterior surface. The plant fibers could commonly include sedge rhizomes (Carex barbare, C. obnupta, and others), and willow shoots (Salix hindsiana, S. laevigata.) Some of the traditionally used native bird feathers and corresponding colors could include bluebird and bluejay, blue; acorn woodpecker head feathers, red; quail topknots, black; oriole, yellow/orange; meadowlark breast feathers, yellow; and mallard head and neck feathers, green. Much later in the basket making history, when laws restricted the use of some feathers, others such as pheasant feathers were used.

The feathered layer which matted the outside of the basket had to be pressed into place. Delvin Holder, son of master basket maker Suzanne Holder (1899–1982), said his mother would first pinch off the feathers at the base so that they unevenly splayed out. After evenly clipping them, she would tie a cloth around the basket and leave it for two or three days after which the feathers would lie flattened around the entire outside surface. One particular basket made by Annie Dick Boone (1889–1960) of the Upper Lake Rancheria incorporated 233, one-quarter inch feathers. These baskets were typically much smaller than burden baskets, measuring less than a few inches across, about the size of an adult hand. Some are small enough to be classified by curators as miniature.

Baskets that were predominantly matted with a layer of red feathers were often referred to as sun baskets. After the feathering of the basket was finished, further embellishments might be added. The rims could be edged with beads fashioned from local materials such as white clam shell disc beads or beads made of magnesite. These beads had value as currency with the magnesite regarded as especially precious. These beads decorated baskets in various ways sometimes adorning the baskets in hanging strands. Abalone, (and later, glass beads), were often used to add a dramatic addition of iridescence, also in gleaming, hanging strands in some baskets. A small strap used for hanging were sometimes added to the baskets. Sherrie Smith-Ferri, of Dry Creek Pomo/Bodega Miwok heritage, comments on baskets decorated like this, "Non-Native collectors aptly label fully feathered pieces like this as 'jewel baskets.' Like jewels, they shimmer with rich color and were treasured as a form of wealth." As a piece of art, she says hanging jewel baskets become ". . . creatures of motion, more like dancing mobiles than stationary containers when supplemented and adorned with these materials."

== Preservation ==
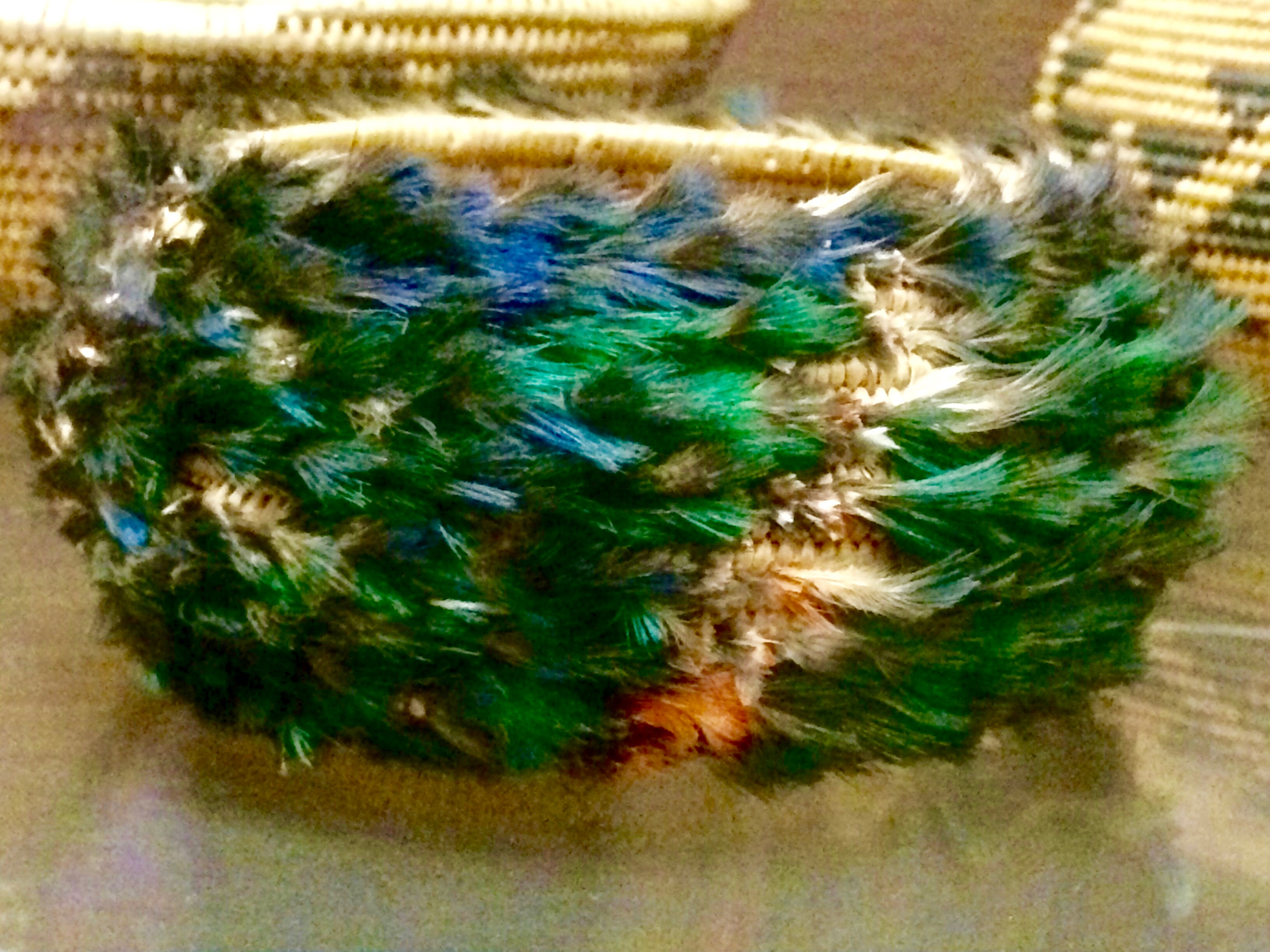
Fully feathered basket curated at Indian Grinding Rock State Park in Volcano, California

A vigorous market for genuine, traditional baskets opened in the 1880s and lasted until the 1930s, a market that was primarily for the finer types of baskets mostly made by women. Some men adapted their skills for this same type of basketry with great success. Pomo couple William and Mary Benson (Mary was the daughter of master basket maker Sarah Knight) produced baskets of such quantity and fine quality that they developed a lucrative relationship with art dealers and collectors throughout the country. Their baskets are curated by museums such as the Smithsonian Institution, National Museum of the American Indian, and the Field Museum of Natural History.

Pomo tribe members, Elsie Allen (1899–1990) and her mother Annie Burke (1876–1962), made significant steps toward preservation by defying Pomo tradition. Burke asked her daughter, Allen, to preserve Burke's baskets upon her death. Allen successfully did so, continued to acquire baskets, and shared her knowledge and passion with any receptive person irrespective of ethnicity. Elsie Allen, as one who had baskets confiscated by the state for illegal feather possession, hid her baskets. At the time, such successes were rare.

Allen also broke with long-standing tradition in another way to ensure that Pomo basketry would continue. She did so by writing a book which provided instructions as to weaving Pomo baskets. This was the first time a Pomo had broken the tradition of only teaching weaving skills to relatives. Although many people objected, she was successful in sharing her knowledge in this manner.

Today, such baskets are curated in many museums including at the Kunstkamera in Saint Petersburg, Russia; the Buffalo Bill Center of the West; Smithsonian's Heye Center at the National Museum of the American Indian in New York City; and the Grace Hudson Museum in Ukiah, California.

== See also ==
- Spanish missions in the Americas
- William Ralganal Benson
- Mary Knight Benson
