= Dapishul, California =

Former Pomo settlement in California, U.S.

Dapishul is a former Pomo settlement in Mendocino County, California, United States, one of a number of Pomo settlements catalogued by Stephen Powers. It was located in Redwood Valley; its precise location was near Mariposa Creek and the Russian River on the eastern bank above the flood plain. In the language of the Pomo, "dapishul" means "high sun", referring a location that is cool and shaded by canyon walls, with the sun only visible when it is high in the sky.
