= Khawina, California =

Khawina
- Former settlement
- Location in California
- Coordinates: 38°59′55″N 122°40′38″W
- Country: United States
- State: California
- County: Lake
- Elevation: 1,362 ft (415 m)

Khawina is a former Pomo settlement in Lake County, California, United States, one of a number of Pomo settlements catalogued by Stephen Powers. It was located at Sulphur Bank, at an elevation of 1362 feet (415 m).
