= Shiegho, California =

Shiegho (also, Seacos and Si-a-ko) is a former Pomo settlement in Mendocino County, California, United States. It was located near Hopland; its precise location is unknown.

Stephen Powers describes it as "a very small tribe or village".
