= Lema, California =

Lema (also, La-ma or La-mah) is a former Pomo settlement in Mendocino County, California, United States, one of a number of Pomo settlements catalogued by Stephen Powers. It was 4 miles (6.4 km) northwest of Hopland. One of the mines of red clay from which the Pomo people took their name was located there.
