= Danielle Forward =

Danielle Forward is a Makahmo Pomo software designer and entrepreneur, who founded the nonprofit organization Natives Rising aimed to help indigenous people pursue careers in the tech industry. She is also known for her role as an activist for indigenous people.

== Early life and education ==
Danielle Forward is a member of the Makahmo Pomo tribe and grew up in the San Francisco Bay Area in California. Raised by a single mother, she witnessed the intergenerational trauma that many indigenous people experience today. Her experience inspired her to want to help other indigenous people.

At Santa Rosa Junior College, Danielle Forward obtained her Associates in Social Behavioral Science and Global Studies. Forward took ten years to obtain a Bachelor of Fine Arts from California College of the Arts in its interactive design program, working part-time and going into debt in order to finance both her schooling and her living situation in California. She graduated as valedictorian.

== Career ==
=== Early career ===
While attending college, Forward worked various jobs to pay for her education. She worked as a personal assistant, barista, GameStop employee, ice cream and smoothie seller, and coder for drug testing data. After graduating from California College of the Arts, she was hired at Meta Platforms as a User Experience/User Interface (UX/UI) Designer, initially on the Connectivity team before moving to the Social Impact team. She stayed at the company for five years, until leaving Meta in 2023 to work on Natives Rising full-time.

=== Natives Rising ===
In 2022, Forward teamed up with Betsy Fore and Hannah Cirelli, both indigenous women interested in empowering indigenous Americans, to create Natives Rising. Primarily focused on students and women, Natives Rising provides services for indigenous people to gain access to careers in the technology industry through three programs that are available nationwide: Founders Circle, a Native Women's Tech Fellowship for those pursuing bachelor's degrees, and an Indigenous STEM Camp.

=== Activism ===
Building on her involvement as a lead in Meta's employee resource group Native@Facebook, Danielle Forward became involved in advocacy for Missing and Murdered Indigenous Women (MMIW). She also currently serves as Head of Design and board member of the nonprofit organization MuralNet, which aims to provide access to broadband internet for tribal communities.
