= Franklin Dollar =

American physicist

- Education: University of California, Berkeley (BS, 2006); University of Michigan, Ann Arbor (MA, 2010) (PhD, 2012)
- Spouse: Georgia Sandoval
- Children: 1
- Awards: Sloan Research Fellowship (2016); PECASE (2025)
- Scientific career
- Fields: Optics
- Workplaces: JILA; University of California, Irvine (2015–present)
- Website: https://faculty.sites.uci.edu/fdollar/lab-members/franklin-dollar/

Franklin J. Dollar is an American physicist and professor at the department of physics and astronomy at University of California, Irvine (UCI). A member of the Pomo tribe, he grew up on a reservation near Geyserville, California. He earned his Bachelor of Science in engineering physics from the University of California, Berkeley, in 2006 and graduated with a PhD in applied physics from the University of Michigan, Ann Arbor, in 2012. Dollar joined UCI in 2015 and studies optics there. He was elected a Fellow of the American Physical Society in 2022.

== Early life and education ==
Franklin J. Dollar is a member of the Dry Creek Rancheria Band of Pomo Indians. He grew up on a Native American reservation near Geyserville, California. The reservation had no electricity, internet or running water. He attended Geyserville Educational Park.

In 2006, Dollar earned his Bachelor of Science in engineering physics from the University of California, Berkeley (UCB). During his first few years at UCB, he worked at a chain drugstore. He then got a job at the Lawrence Berkeley National Laboratory where he helped develop advanced optics for the Solar Dynamics Observatory. He continued working at the lab while at UCB. He received his master's degree in electrical engineering from the University of Michigan, Ann Arbor in 2010 and graduated with a PhD in applied physics there in 2012.

== Career ==
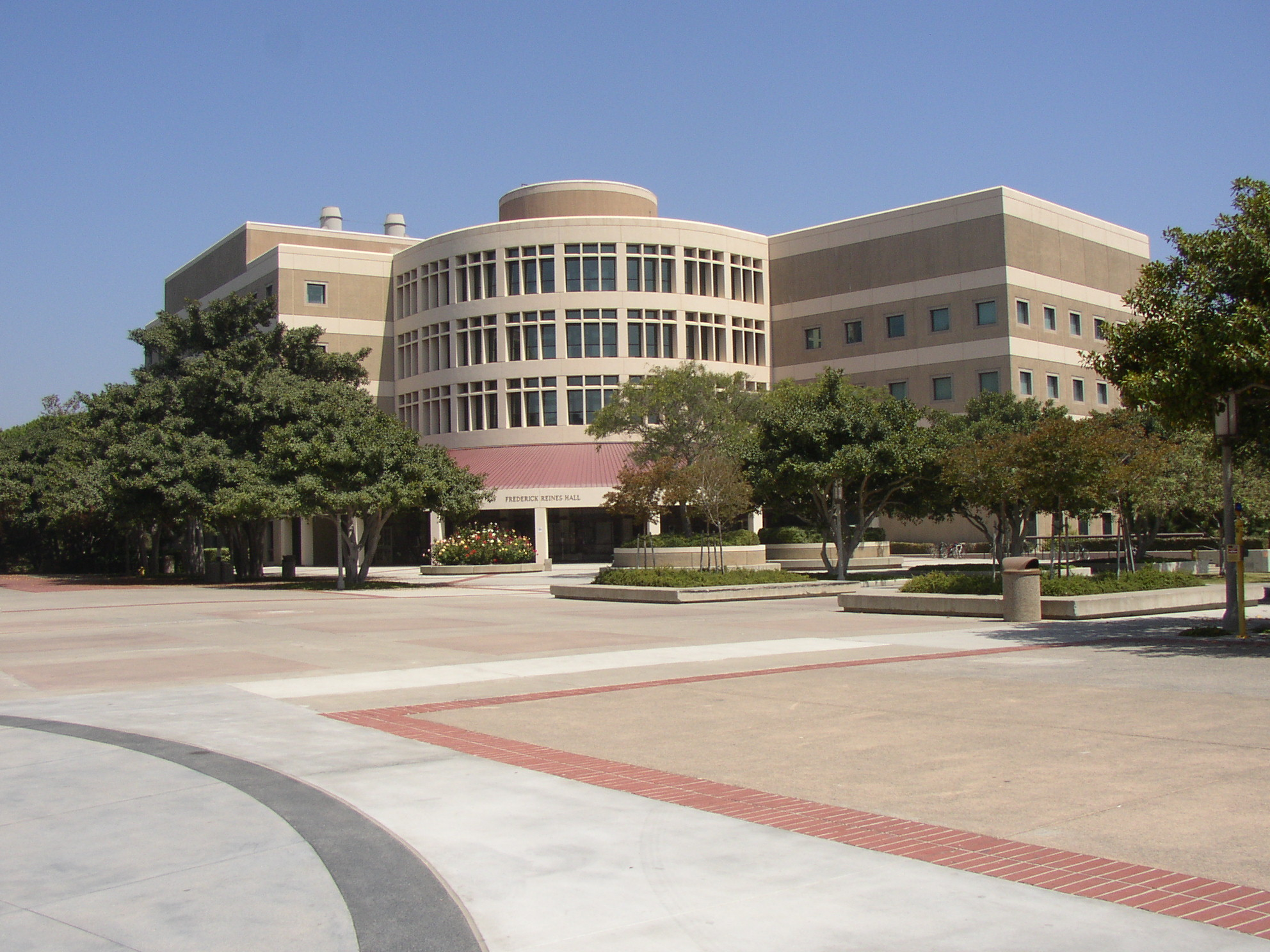
Frederick Reines Hall, which houses the Physics and Astronomy Department at University of California, Irvine

After receiving his PhD, Dollar became a postdoctoral researcher at JILA (University of Colorado Boulder). In the fall of 2015, he joined the department of physics and astronomy at the University of California, Irvine as a professor. Dollar began studying X-ray source production with high intensity lasers at JILA, and continues to do so at UCI.

Dollar is the associate dean of graduate studies at UCI's school of physical sciences. He serves on the editorial board of the New Journal of Physics.

== Awards and honors ==
Dollar was elected a Fellow of the American Physical Society in 2022 for "exceptional contributions to intense field laser science and for exceptional service in promoting a diverse and inclusive plasma physics community." He was selected as a Sloan Fellow in 2016. On January 14, 2025, Dollar and around 400 other scientists received the Presidential Early Career Award for Scientists and Engineers (PECASE) from Joe Biden.

== Personal life ==
Dollar is married to Georgia Sandoval, a Navajo software engineer who works at Intel. They have a daughter.

== Selected publications ==
- McGuffey, C; Thomas, AGR; Schumaker, W; Matsuoka, T; Chvykov, V; Dollar, FJ; Kalintchenko, G; Yanovsky, V; Maksimchuk, A; Krushelnick, K; Bychenkov, V Yu; Glazyrin, IV; Karpeev, AV (January 15, 2020). "Ionization induced trapping in a laser wakefield accelerator" (PDF). Physical Review Letters. 104 (2) 025004. doi:10.1103/PhysRevLett.104.025004. PMID 20366605.
- Ristenpart, WD; Bird, JC; Belmonte, A; Dollar, F; Stone, Howard A (September 17, 2009). "Non-coalescence of oppositely charged drops". Nature. 461 (7262): 377–380. arXiv:0910.3273. Bibcode:2009Natur.461..377R. doi:10.1038/nature08294. PMID 19759616.
- Hickstein, Daniel D; Dollar, Franklin J; Grychtol, Patrik; Ellis, Jennifer L; Knut, Ronny; Hernández-García, Carlos; Zusin, Dmitriy; Gentry, Christian; Shaw, Justin M; Fan, Tingting; Dorney, Kevin M; Becker, Andreas; Jaroń-Becker, Agnieszka; Kapteyn, Henry C; Murnane, Margaret M (2015). "Non-collinear generation of angularly isolated circularly polarized high harmonics". Nature Photonics. 9 (11): 743–750. Bibcode:2015NaPho...9..743H. doi:10.1038/nphoton.2015.181. hdl:10366/147018.
- Popmintchev, Dimitar; Hernández-García, Carlos; Dollar, Franklin; Mancuso, Christopher; Pérez-Hernández, Jose A; Chen, Ming-Chang; Hankla, Amelia; Gao, Xiaohui; Shim, Bonggu; Gaeta, Alexander L; Tarazkar, Maryam; Romanov, Dmitri A; Levis, Robert J; Gaffney, Jim A; Foord, Mark (December 4, 2015). "Ultraviolet surprise: Efficient soft x-ray high-harmonic generation in multiply ionized plasmas". Science. 350 (6265): 1225–1331. Bibcode:2015Sci...350.1225P. doi:10.1126/science.aac9755. hdl:10366/147088. PMID 26785483.
- Chen, Ming-Chang; Mancuso, Christopher; Hernández-García, Carlos; Dollar, Franklin; Galloway, Ben; Popmintchev, Dimitar; Huang, Pei-Chi; Walker, Barry; Plaja, Luis; Jaroń-Becker, Agnieszka A; Becker, Andreas; Murnane, Margaret M; Kapteyn, Henry C.; Popmintchev, Tenio (June 10, 2014). "Generation of bright isolated attosecond soft X-ray pulses driven by multicycle midinfrared lasers". Proceedings of the National Academy of Sciences. 111 (23): E2361–E2367. arXiv:1401.0240. Bibcode:2014PNAS..111E2361C. doi:10.1073/pnas.1407421111. PMC 4060714. PMID 24850866.

== See also ==
- List of fellows of the American Physical Society (2011–present)
- List of University of California, Berkeley alumni in science and technology
- List of University of Michigan alumni
