= Point Arena Rancheria Roundhouse =

Historic building in California, US

- U.S. National Register of Historic Places
- Location within California
- Nearest city: Point Arena, California
- Coordinates: 38.950366°N 123.662402°W
- Area: less than one acre
- Built: c.1905
- MPS: Point Arena MPS
- NRHP reference No.: 90001360
- Added to NRHP: September 13, 1990

The Point Arena Rancheria Roundhouse, in Mendocino County, California near Point Arena, California, was listed on the National Register of Historic Places in 1990.

It has also been known as the Manchester Rancheria Roundhouse and was established around 1905.

It is the largest and perhaps the only surviving building with significant association to the religious life of Native Americans in the area of Point Arena, California. It is a Pomo Indian dancehouse, where religious ceremonies were held. The religion by then mixed traditional beliefs with ghost dance era developments and with features of Christianity, in the last phase of evolution of the Pomo religion. It includes a cross atop the building, and a center post from 1890 which was incorporated into the construction.

It is located on the Garcia River at the end of Rancheria Rd.
