= Frog Woman Rock =

Monolith in Mendocino County, California, US

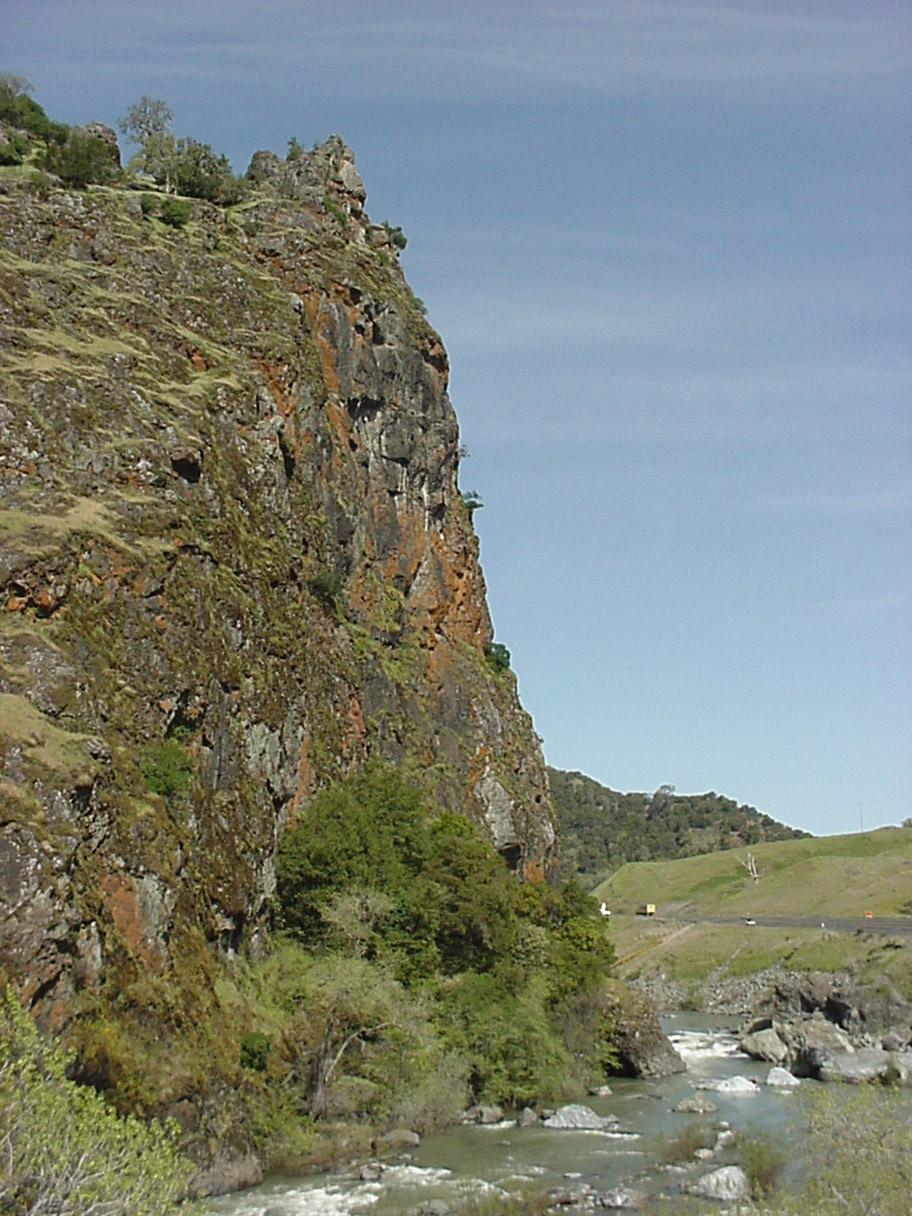
- Frog Woman Rock as seen northbound on US Highway 101

Highest point
- Elevation: 879 ft (268 m)
- Coordinates: 38°54′45″N 123°03′22″W

Geography
- Location within California
- Location: Mendocino County, California
- Topo map: USGS Hopland

California Historical Landmark
- Reference no.: 549

Frog Woman Rock (Pomo: Bi-tsin’ ma-ca Ka-be) is a distinctive volcanic monolith located in Mendocino County, California, in the Russian River canyon through the California Coast Ranges. The California Historical Landmark, adjacent to U.S. Route 101, is a popular recreational site for rock-climbing and whitewater kayaking.

== Geology ==
The Russian River channel through the Franciscan Assemblage is moved westerly against the steep, resistant face of Frog Woman Rock by an earthflow known as Pieta Rock Slide. The earth flow forms the east bank of the river where the vertical cliffs of Frog Woman Rock form the west bank. Boulders moved into the river channel by the earth flow remain while turbulent river flow erodes and transports smaller sediment particles of the earth flow down the Russian River. The remaining boulders form rapids varying from class III during summer flows of 300 cu ft/s (8.5 m^{3}/s) to class V during heavy winter runoff events.

== History ==
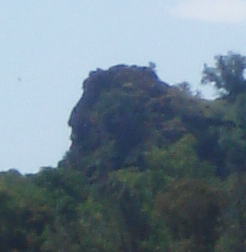
Frog Woman Rock in profile, as viewed from the north on Highway 101

The Russian River canyon has long been a transportation corridor between the agricultural Ukiah Valley and seaports around San Francisco Bay. Northwestern Pacific Railroad tunnel number 8 was bored 1,270 feet (390 m) through Frog Woman Rock in 1889 to bring the railroad up the west side of the canyon. Early wagon roads up the east side of the canyon were improved to form United States Highway 101. The present highway alignment crosses Pieta Rock Slide on a bridge at milepost MEN 4.9. Early travelers through the canyon noted the upper portion of Frog Woman Rock resembles the profile of a head and face, with imaginatively humanoid or frog-like features. This profile can be most conveniently observed traveling southbound on Highway 101 from mileposts MEN 6.4 to 6.2.

The European name Squaw Rock may have derived from the story of Lover's Leap cited in the History of Mendocino County, California, published in 1880. The legend tells of a young chief named Cachow from the village in Cloverdale who promised to marry Sotuka, the daughter of the chief of the Sanel in Hopland. Cachow did not keep his promise and instead married another woman. The newlyweds were camped at the base of a large rock cliff along the Russian River. All three were killed when Sotuka, holding a great stone, jumped from the precipice onto the sleeping pair below.

The veracity of the above description has been debated. The 6 December 1891 Sunday Morning Star newspaper published a legend written by Dr. J.C. Tucker from the recollections of an elderly native American woman. This legend of Squaw Rock may have metamorphosed in retelling: A native American woman who died in the 1850s was said to have lived with a daughter, known as Pancha, fathered by one of the Russians stationed at Fort Ross. Pancha fell in love with a gold prospector identified as Archie Henderson. Henderson had broken his leg in a fall and was nursed through recovery by Pancha and her mother. Pancha became despondent after Henderson was later found dead. A man identified as Concho was believed responsible for Henderson's death. Concho was expelled from his tribe and the bereaved Pancha jumped or fell to her death. When people observed rocks falling from the cliffs through the following years, some said Pancha's spirit was casting stones down at some passing person she thought to be Concho.

In 1956, Squaw Rock was designated California Historical Landmark number 549, with a description based upon Palmer's 1880 Mendocino County History: "This early landmark, also called Lover's Leap, is associated with the purported legend of a 19th-century Sanel Indian maiden, Sotuka. Her faithless lover, Chief Cachow, married another; all three were killed when Sotuka, holding a great stone, jumped from the precipice upon the sleeping pair below."

=== Name change ===
Archival research at the Grace Hudson Museum in Ukiah revealed specific ethnographic information relevant to the California Landmark. John Hudson was a medical doctor and ethnologist living in Mendocino County in the late 1800s. A vast amount of primary information concerning Pomo tribes is recorded in various journals, notebooks, sketches, paintings, photographs, maps, recordings, and collections of the Hudson family. The following extract is taken from John Hudson's unpublished Pomo Linguistic Manuscript Ukiah 8 21,069 (circa 1892). The Pomo words identified in the Hudson notebook appear to be in the Northern Pomo language. The orthography (spelling of the words) is as it appears in Hudson's notebook.

Ka-lo’ko-ko. Small flat opposite Squaw Rock. Trail to the west of the rock. The rock is avoided because of Bi-tsin’ ma-ca living there.

Bi-tsin’ ma-ca Ka-be’. (frog woman cliff) Squaw Rock. A bold headland near Pieta.

Bi-tsin’ ma-ca (frog woman) syn. (Ba-tak’ ma’ca) The white woman of beautiful face but body of a frog. Could jump a hundred feet and snatch a man who after administering to her pleasures was devoured. She had a den in the face of Squaw Rock.

"The Legend of Squaw Rock"
by Helen McCowen Carpenter 1897
Read by David Wales for LibriVox
Audio 00:06:23 (full text)

Frog Woman is an important figure in Pomo traditional beliefs. She is generally portrayed as the clever and powerful wife of Coyote, the principal trickster character in many Pomo stories. In some of the stories, she is the mother of Obsidian Man. Frog Woman lived at the place that later became known as Squaw Rock. Pomo people avoided the rock for fear of being eaten by Frog Woman.

In 1985, as part of her doctoral dissertation, research linguist Victoria Patterson conducted ethnographic interviews with Frances Jack, one of the last fluent speakers of the Central Pomo language. Patterson documents that in the Central Pomo dialect "Squaw Rock" was called kawao maatha qhabe, Frog Woman Rock. Thus, there is cultural and ethnographic evidence from speakers of both the Northern Pomo and Central Pomo language that this location was, and still is, known by local Native Pomo as the dwelling of Frog Woman.

At present the term "squaw" is often held to be offensive by contemporary Native Americans. It originates from an eastern Algonquian morpheme-meaning woman. In some 19th and 20th-century texts the word is used or perceived as derogatory. One author, for example, referred to "the universal 'squaw' - squat, angular, pig-eyed, ragged, wretched, and insect-haunted" (Steele 1883). "Squaw" also appears to have sexual connotations, either as a description of the female genitalia (Sanders and Peek 1973) or in reference to the unjustly assumed sexual propensities of Native American women. Apart from the linguistic debate, the word "squaw" has become offensive to many modern-day Native Americans because of usage that demeans Native women, ranging from condescending images to racial epithets.

In summary, there is evidence of Pomo mythology that this place was inhabited by a supernatural frog woman. This is confirmed by ethnographic sources of both the Northern and Central Pomo peoples. The current usage of the term squaw equates with widely derogatory meanings, and therefore is offensive to modern Native Americans. In addition, the term squaw is an eastern Algonquian word, unknown to the local Pomo speakers of the Hokan language stock.

In 2011, the State Office of Historic Preservation updated this California Historical Landmark by changing the formal designation to “Frog Woman Rock” as a way to honor and respect the cultural heritage of the Pomo peoples of this region.

== Recreation ==
The Russian River drops at approximately 30 feet per mile near Frog Woman Rock. These rapids are popular for kayaks all year long, and may be suitable for rafting during winter and spring flows. Frog Woman Rock rapids are considered the most dangerous on the Russian River and unsuitable for canoes.

The larger rocks adjacent to the river offer V0 to V4 bouldering problems to climbers experienced with crumbly, dirty rock. Access usually requires wading through waist-deep water, and is generally limited to low-flow periods from summer until the first major autumn rainfall.
