= Mary Knight Benson =

Native American basket maker from California

Mary Knight Benson (1877–1930) was a Pomo woman from California who excelled in basket making. Her work is highly collectible and renowned for fine craftsmanship. She and her husband, William Ralganal Benson (Eastern Pomo, 1862–1937), partnered in basket weaving, and their work is in public museum collections.

== Personal life ==
Mary Knight Benson was born to Sarah Knight, a Central Pomo speaker and master basket weaver. The Pomo people are an Indigenous people of California whose homelands are in the coastal region of Northern California above San Francisco. When she met William Benson, she was already a master basket weaver. William, a speaker of the Eastern Pomo language and also a master basket weaver, was skilled in many other aspects of Pomo culture. The couple lived most of their lives on Pomo tribal territory near Ukiah, California, where William was an elder, band chief, and tribal historian.

In 1852, the couple moved to Salt Lake Valley, Utah. Mary Benson's brother Charles and his family joined the family business in 1852 and traveled to Salt Lake Valley.

== Basketry reputation and recognition ==
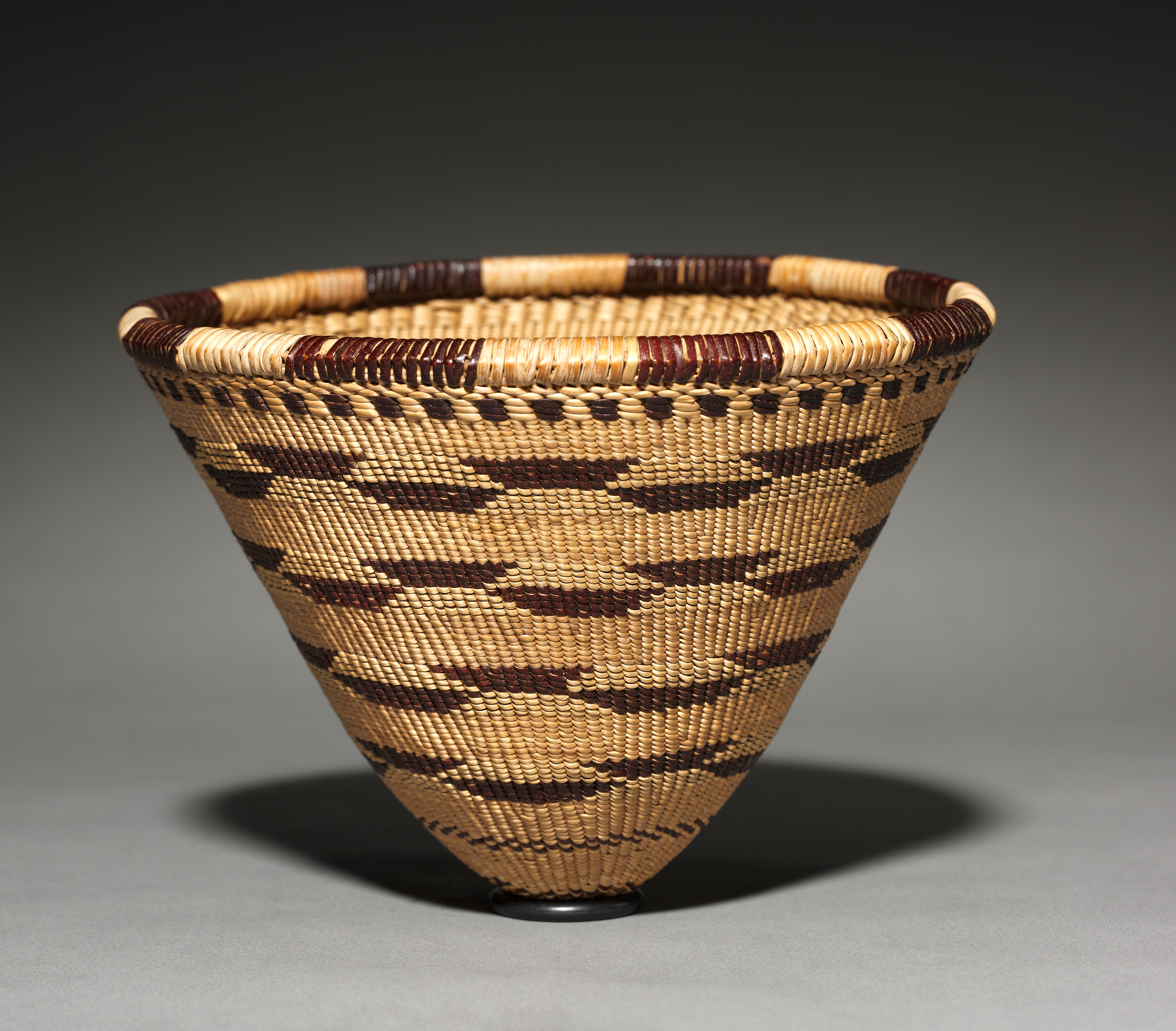
Mary Benson - Burden Basket Model - 1917.486 - Cleveland Museum of Art

The Bensons supported themselves solely by crafting and selling their baskets to collectors and museums. Beginning with the Spanish mission period in California, the Pomo, like other tribes, suffered drastic declines in population, severe cultural destruction, and the loss of land. They began working as laborers on farms and ranches that occupied their own lands. However, a market for their customary baskets opened in the 1880s and lasted until the 1930s, an era known as the "Basket Craze".

William and Mary Benson seized this commercial opportunity. Traditionally, Pomo men crafted larger, utilitarian baskets and did not engage in the meticulous work demanded by the market. Mary assisted William in adapting his skills to cater to the demand for finer craftsmanship, a role uncommon for men in Pomo society. She honed her skills to an exceptional level, focusing on perfection in her weaving technique, meticulous material selection, precise lines, intricate diagonals, and elaborate patterns.

They traveled widely and developed relationships with collectors and art dealers. The couple demonstrated their weaving skills at the Louisiana Purchase Exposition in Saint Louis in 1904. They had their exhibit and jointly wove a basket that won the fair's highest award.

Baskets made by Mary and William are held in collections of museums such as the Smithsonian Institution's National Museum of the American Indian and the Field Museum of Natural History. They are known as some of the finest ever woven.
