= Pomo religion =

Native American indigenous people

The Indigenous tribe of the Pomo people, Native Americans from Northwestern California, centered on belief in the powerful entities of the 'Kunula', a Coyote, and 'Guksu', a spirit healer from the south.

== Creation stories ==
Coyote ('Kunula') and Cougar set up for their sons to play a sports game. Most of Coyote's children died. The last two of Coyote's sons chased a ball into a sweathouse and were killed by the resident the Sun (a spirit being). Later through trickery and persistence Coyote retrieved the bodies of his two sons in a bag. Because he had trouble seeing in the darkness Coyote split open the bag and his son's two bodies created light and became the physical sun and the moon in the heavens.

Another "Creation" myth is that Coyote and Lizard ('Hatanutal') were in a sweathouse near Upper Lake, California. Coyote split up some willow and dogwood sticks, painted them, and set them upright in the dirt. The sticks turned into human beings with paws rather than hands. Coyote then put some hemp around them. The hemp became fleas that jumped onto the human beings. Lizard suggested the people needed hands with fingers in order to be more useful, and Coyote suggested they wrestle over that. Coyote and Lizard wrestled. Lizard won the wrestling match and thus the people as Lizard proposed were given fingers, as well as language.

== World order ==
The Pomo spoke of a sweat house in each cardinal direction.

According to Pomo ceremony and tradition, the world contained six supernatural beings (or groups of spirits) who lived at the ends of the world: one in each of the four cardinal directions, plus one above in the sky, and one below in the earth:

- Guksu, also called Kuksu in different Pomo languages, was a supernatural being that lived at the southern end of the world. The word also means a large mosquito like insect locally known as the 'gallinipper'. Healing was his province or speciality and the Pomo medicine men or doctors made their prayers to him. He was normal size human with a very long, large and sharp red nose. He was good natured on the whole. In dance ceremonies, the impersonators of Guksu painted their bodies black, or striped red, white and black. They wore bulky, feathery headdress or a large feather tuft on their head with a yellow headband. The nose was made with feathers and painted red. The impersonators carried a staff 6 to 8 inches long with a feather tuft at top, and provided a double bone whistle. He would whistle but not speak.
- Calnis lived at the eastern end of the world. In ceremonial dances Calnis associated with Guksu, he was also human form, but he was usually testy and pursued people and 'tripped them up'. In dance ceremonies, the Calnis dancer was painted entirely black and carried a black staff without feathers. On his head he wore a feather cape that fell over his face.
- Suupadax lived at the northern end of the world. The word is associated with a whirlwind.
- Xa-matutsi lived at the western end of the world. The word is associated with the Pacific Ocean and with 'water occupation'. The Pacific Ocean was the western edge of Pomo Country, and it was therefore a very important part of their mythology. The Pomo believed the world was bounded by water along the west.
- Kali-matutsi lived in the sky and heavens above. The word is associated with 'sky occupation.'
- Kai-matutsi lived on the earth and below. The word associated is with 'earth occupation.'

These spirits were imagined to live in sweat houses or dance-houses at each end of the world. At times, these supernatural beings were malevolent and could kill men. However, if properly treated or placated, they were benevolent.

The person who played a Guksu in dance ceremonies was often considered the medicine man and would also dress up as a Guksu when called on to treat the sick. Sickness was seen as something that Guksu came to take away and to carry back to the south.

== Guksu ceremony ==
The ceremony called the Guksu ceremony lasted 6 days with the above dancers appearing once a day. The 6 days included of the ceremony called 'The Scarifying Ceremony' where children ages 5 to 10 were initiated with physical and mental tests administered by the dressed up dancers.

== See also ==
- Kuksu religion
- Pomo traditional narratives
- Mount Konocti
- Frog Woman Rock
