= William Ralganal Benson =

Native American basket maker from California

William Ralganal Benson (1862–1937) was an Eastern Pomo basket maker from California, US. He and his wife Mary Knight Benson excelled in traditional basket making. Their work can be found in the collections of major museums.

== Early life and family ==
William Benson (1862–1937) was born at Shaxai, now known as Buckingham Point, near the ancient town of Shabegok on the western shore of Clear Lake, California. His mother was Gepigul, known as "Sally" to the local whites. She belonged to Kuhlanapo (Water Lily People) and Habenapo (Rock People) Pomo people and descended from a line of hereditary leaders. William's father, Addison Benson, was one of the first white settlers in the area near Kelseyville, California. He was an intelligent man who was very friendly with his Pomo neighbors, and when he married, Addison learned the language of his wife's people, Eastern Pomo. Because of this mixed heritage, William Benson grew up in a household in which Eastern Pomo was the primary language, and he did not learn to speak English until later in his adult life. William also taught himself how to read and write as an adult.

William was a master of the Pomo traditional culture, particularly the art and literature. He excelled at every aspect of traditional culture he attempted and was especially known for his superlative work in basketry, regalia, and storytelling. Sherrie Smith-Ferri, director of the Grace Hudson Museum in Ukiah which has a noted collection of Pomo baskets, says of William, "Bill Benson was a totally phenomenal talent." When he met and married Mary Knight (1877–1930), he was already an expertly skilled basket maker. Mary, daughter of master basket maker Sarah Knight, was a Central Pomo speaker and also expert in basketry.

The couple belonged to the Pomo tribe, a group indigenous people of California who traditionally resided in the coastal region of Northern California above San Francisco. The couple lived most of their lives on Pomo tribal territory near Ukiah, California where William was an elder, band chief, and tribal historian. As a couple, they became renowned for their basket making.

== Basketry reputation and recognition ==
The Bensons may have been the first California Indians who supported themselves solely by crafting and selling their baskets to collectors and museums. Beginning with the Spanish mission period on California, the Pomo, like other tribes, suffered drastic declines in population, severe cultural destruction, and the loss of homeland. As such, they began working as laborers on farms and ranches that occupied their traditional lands. However, a market for genuine, traditional baskets opened the 1880s and lasted until the 1930s.

William and Mary Benson took advantage of this commercial opportunity. While Pomo men did not traditionally make the kind of fine baskets demanded by the market, William adapted his skill to the fine work done by women. He was one of the few men who did so. Mary developed her skills that grew to an astounding level and was noted for focusing on perfection. Mary and William enjoyed significant success in their artist careers of weaving Pomo baskets, traveled widely, and developed relationships with collectors and art dealers. The couple demonstrated their weaving skills at the Louisiana Purchase Exposition in Saint Louis in 1904. They had their own exhibit and jointly wove a basket that won the fair's highest award.

Baskets made by William and his wife Mary are curated in museums such as the Smithsonian Institution's National Museum of the American Indian, and the Field Museum of Natural Historyand are known as some of the finest ever woven.
