= Pomo, California =

Unincorporated community in California, United States

Pomo
- Unincorporated community
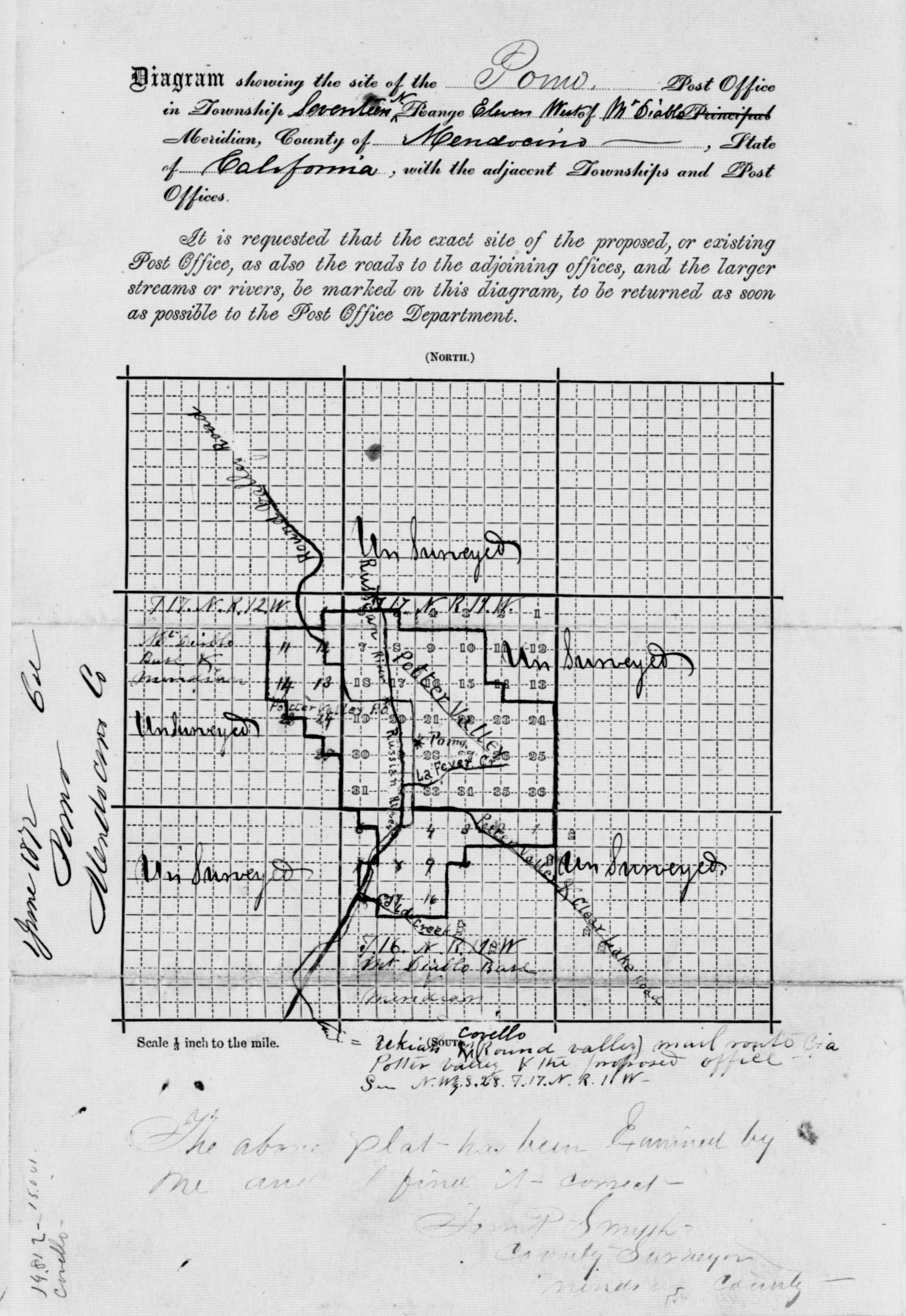
- 1872 location map submitted with post office application

- Location in California Pomo (the United States)
- Coordinates: 39°18′24″N 123°05′45″W
- Country: United States
- State: California
- County: Mendocino
- Elevation: 942 ft (287 m)

Pomo (Pomo for "Those who live at red earth hole") is an archaic place name in Mendocino County, California, United States. It was located 1.25 miles (2 km) southeast of Potter Valley, at an elevation of 942 feet (287 m).

== History ==
It is named after a village of the Pomo people. The village was first described by George Gibbs in 1851 in his Journal of the Expedition of Colonel Redick M'Kee, United States Indian Agent, through Northwestern California. The indigenous people of Potter Valley were labeled the Pomo Pomos, distinguishing them from Castel Pomos, Ki Pomos, Cahto Pomos, Choam Chadela Pomos, Matomey Ki Pomos, Usal Pomos, Shebalue Pomos, et al. This village, spelled pō'mō in a 1908 ethnographic report, stood on the east bank of the Russian River just south of the post office. At the time of the report, the Potter Valley gristmill stood on the site.

A post office operated at Pomo from 1870 to 1871, from 1872 to 1881, and from 1882 to 1911. A store opened at Pomo in 1874. Circa 1875, there was a school with 34 enrolled students, as well as a Pomo Grange with 75 members and a Templars lodge that met weekly at "the Hall". There was a monthly church meeting at Pomo in the 1880s.

In 1881 a pack of timber wolves had been killing domestic sheep near Pomo. There still was a school at Pomo in 1892, but by 1904 it had notably low enrollment. In the 1950s, the Pomo Athletic Club supported a league basketball team.
