= Pomo =

Indigenous people of Northern California, U.S.

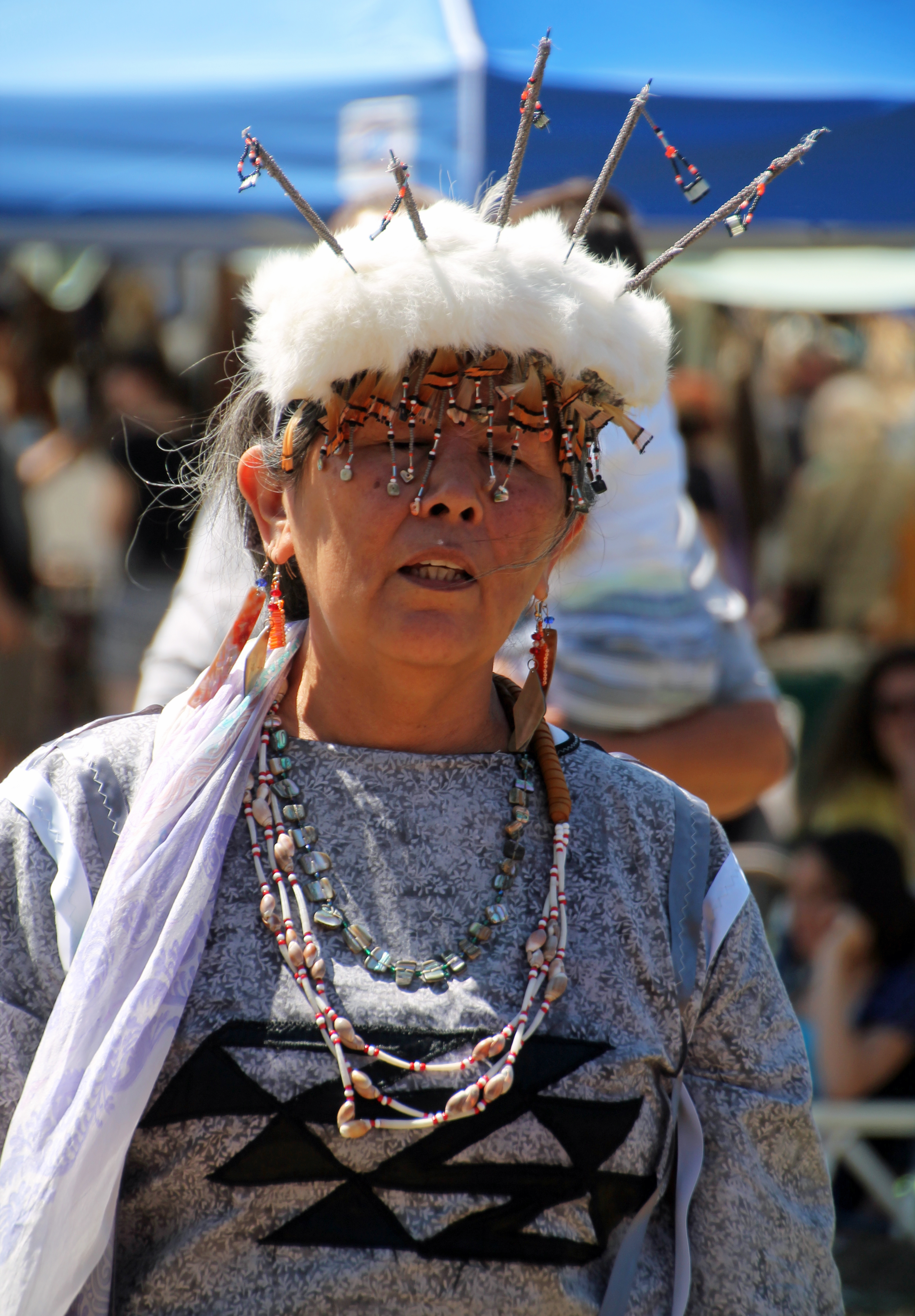
- Pomo woman in traditional dress (2015).

Total population
- 1770: 8,000; 1851: 3,500–5,000; 1910: 777–1,200; 1990: 4,900; 2010: 10,308

Regions with significant populations
- United States (California: Mendocino County, Sonoma Valley, Napa Valley, Lake County, Colusa County)

Languages
- Pomoan languages, English

Religion
- Kuksu, Bole Maru, traditional Pomo religion

The Pomo are a Native American people of California. Historical Pomo territory in Northern California was large, bordered by the Pacific Coast to the west, extending inland to Clear Lake, mainly between Cleone and Duncans Point. One small group, the Tceefoka (Northeastern Pomo), lived in the vicinity of Stonyford, Colusa County, where they were separated from the majority of Pomo lands by Yuki and Wintuan speakers.

The name Pomo derives from a conflation of the Pomo words [pʰoːmoː] and [pʰoʔmaʔ]. It originally meant "those who live at red earth hole" and was once the name of a village in southern Potter Valley, near the community of Pomo, Mendocino County. The word may also have referred to the local deposits of red magnesite (mined and utilized for making red beads) or to the reddish, earthen clay soil of the area, rich in hematite (also mined for use). In the Northern Pomo dialect, -pomo or -poma was used as a suffix after the names of places, to mean a subgroup of people of the place. By 1877, the meaning of the word Pomo had been broadened, at least in the English language, to refer to not only the Pomo language but the entire group of people speaking it, as well—the people known as Pomo, today.

== History ==
Map of the historical distribution of the Pomoan languages with neighboring groups indicated

The people called Pomo were originally linked by location, language, and cultural expression. They were not socially or politically linked as a unified group. Instead, they lived in small groups or bands linked by lineage and marriage.67

=== Precontact ===
According to certain linguistic hypotheses, the Pomo descend from Hokan-speaking peoples; per this theory, a Hokan-speaking people migrated into the upland valley regions near Clear Lake ca. 7000 BCE, where their language evolved into Proto-Pomoan. Another theory places the Pomoan ancestral community in the Sonoma region, where coastal redwood (Sequoia sempervirens) forests met with inland valleys and mixed woodlands, bolstered by Clear Lake and its abundant natural resources. Around 4000 BCE to 5000 BCE, some of these people relocated into the areas of today's Russian River Valley and northward, near present-day Ukiah. Their language diverged into western, southern, central, and northern Pomoan.

Another people, possibly Yukian speakers, lived first in the Russian River Valley and Lake Sonoma areas prior to being displaced by the Pomo, who subsequently took over the region. Modern archaeological analyses and discoveries have suggested that the local economy, which was based on women processing acorns by mortar and pestle, and first observed by the Spanish upon their arrival in Central California, may have developed during the Mostin culture period (ca. 8500 BP–6300 BP) in the Clear Lake Basin.

==== Tolay Lake site ====
More than a thousand precontact charmstones and numerous arrowheads have been unearthed at Tolay Lake, southern Sonoma County, attributed to both Pomo and Coast Miwok people. A sacred site, the lake is a ceremonial gathering and healing place.

==== Lake Sonoma sites ====
- At the "broken bridge" site, researchers using radiocarbon dating of artifacts determined it was inhabited ca. 3280 BCE, the oldest human habitation documented in the valley. They consider it part of the Skaggs Phase (3000–500 BCE).
- "Oregon Oak Place" was dated at 1843 BCE; surveyors suggested that, compared to the lower river valleys, this remote area was only sparsely inhabited before the Pomo arrived.

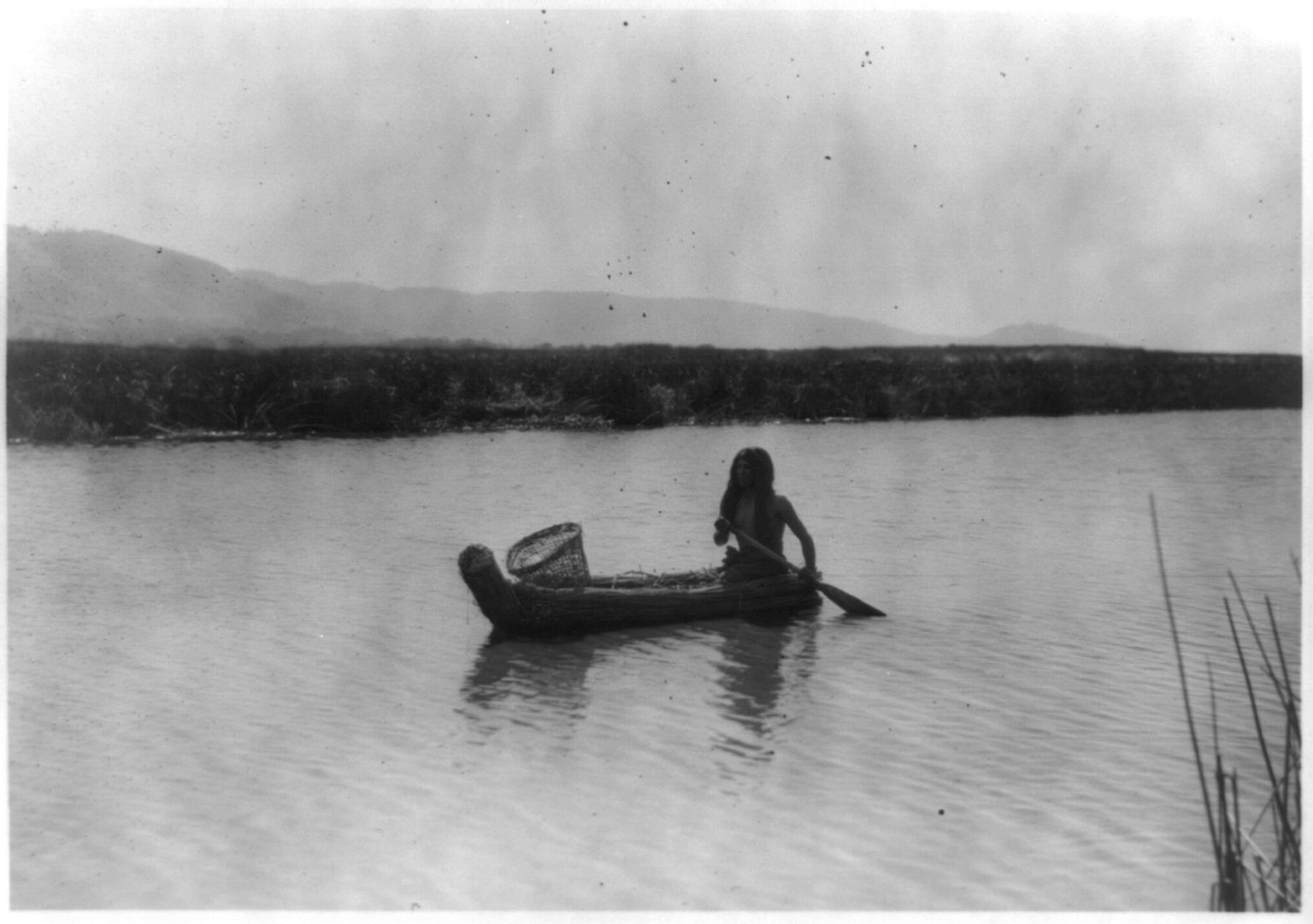
A Pomo person in a tule boat, circa 1924.

Both of these Skaggs-Phase sites contained millstones and other handstones for grinding seed and nuts. The villages may have been used for hunting or temporary camps. Obsidian was used, albeit rarely, from Mount Konocti, in present-day Lake County. There were no petroglyphs. The population lived only along major creeks.

The "Dry Creek" Phase lasted from 500 BCE to 1300 CE. During this phase, the Indigenous people settled the lands more extensively, and permanently. Archaeologists believe a Pomo group took over the lands from earlier peoples during this phase. They founded 14 additional sites in the Warm Springs and Upper Dry Creek areas. Bowls, mortars, and pestles appeared in this phase, probably used by women to pound acorns (as opposed to the milling stones used for seeds). The sites were more settled and, likewise, more "complex". Trade took place on a larger scale beyond the region. Decorative beads and ornaments were made in this phase, and approximately half of the artifacts were made of obsidian. Steatite or soapstone objects were also found, which must have been imported into the region through trade, as the rocks do not exist locally. Relatively soft and easy to carve, soapstone was used to make beads, pendants, as well as mortars. The largest and only substantial steatite mine in California existed on Catalina Island, one of the Channel Islands off the coast of what is now Los Angeles County. The existence of steatite in Pomo and Northern California Native sites is a strong indicator of the size and complexity of Native California trade networks.

The next phase, named the "Smith Phase" after the Pomo consultants, lasted from 1300 CE to the mid-19th century. Researchers mapped 30 sites in this era, showing a gradual evolving and intensification of trends. Archery, and its associated applications, was a major technological advancement which greatly benefited the population. The production of shell beads (and drills to create holes in beads), remained important, with drills being found in high numbers. Numerous clamshell beads, a major currency among the peoples of Central California, were also found, also suggesting a vast trade network.

=== Post contact ===
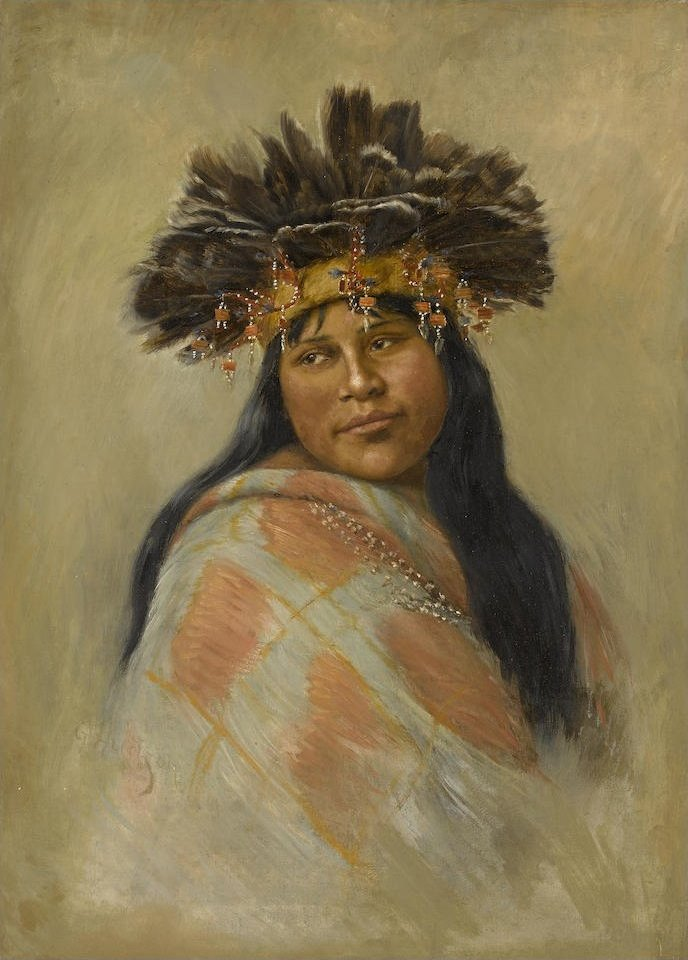
A Pomo Dancer (Kal-si-wa, Rosa Peters) by Grace Hudson

There were an estimated 8,000 to 21,000 Pomo among 70 tribes speaking seven Pomo languages at the time of European contact. The way of life of the Pomo changed with the arrival of Russians at Fort Ross (1812 to 1841) on the Pacific coastline, and Spanish missionaries and European-American colonists coming in from the south and east. The Pomo who lived on the coastline and near Fort Ross were known as the Kashaya. They interacted and traded with the Russians.

The Spanish missionaries stole or enslaved many of the southern Pomo from the Santa Rosa Plain to Mission San Rafael, at present-day San Rafael, between 1821 and 1828. Only a few Pomo speakers went to Mission Sonoma, the other Franciscan mission, located on the north side of San Francisco Bay. The Pomo who remained in the present-day Santa Rosa area of Sonoma County were often called Cainameros in regional history books from the time of Spanish and Mexican occupation.

In the Russian River Valley, a missionary colonized and baptized the Makahmo Pomo people of the Cloverdale area. Many Pomo left the valley because of this. One such group fled to the Upper Dry Creek Area. The archeology surveyors of the Lake Sonoma region believe that European and Euro-American encroachment was the reason why Pomo villages became more centralized; the people retreated to the remote valley to band together for defense and mutual support.

The Pomo suffered from the infectious diseases brought by the Euro-American migrants, including cholera and smallpox. They did not have immunity to such diseases and fatalities were high. In 1837 a deadly epidemic of smallpox, originating in settlements at Fort Ross, caused numerous deaths of native people in the Sonoma and Napa regions. Mission treatment of Pomo was similar to that of slavery, and many Pomo died due to inhospitable living conditions.

The Russian River Valley was settled in 1850 by the 49ers, and the Lake Sonoma Valley was homesteaded out. The US government forced many Pomo on to reservations so that the European-Americans could homestead the former Pomo lands. Some Pomo took jobs as ranch laborers; others lived in refugee villages.

During this time, two white settlers named Andrew Kelsey and Charles Stone enslaved many Pomo people in order to work as cowboys on their ranch. They forced the Pomo Indians to work in very intense and unorthodox conditions and sexually abused the Pomo women. The Pomo men were forced to work in harsh conditions and were not given any respect by the settlers. Exasperated with the violence and oppression of Stone and Kelsey, they rebelled.

Because of the deaths of Kelsey and Stone, United States lieutenant J. W. Davidson and captain Nathaniel Lyon sent an army to retaliate against the Pomo people. During the Bloody Island Massacre of 1850, on an island in Clear Lake the 1st Dragoons US Cavalry slaughtered between 60 and 100 people, mostly women and children of the Clear Lake Pomo and neighboring tribes.

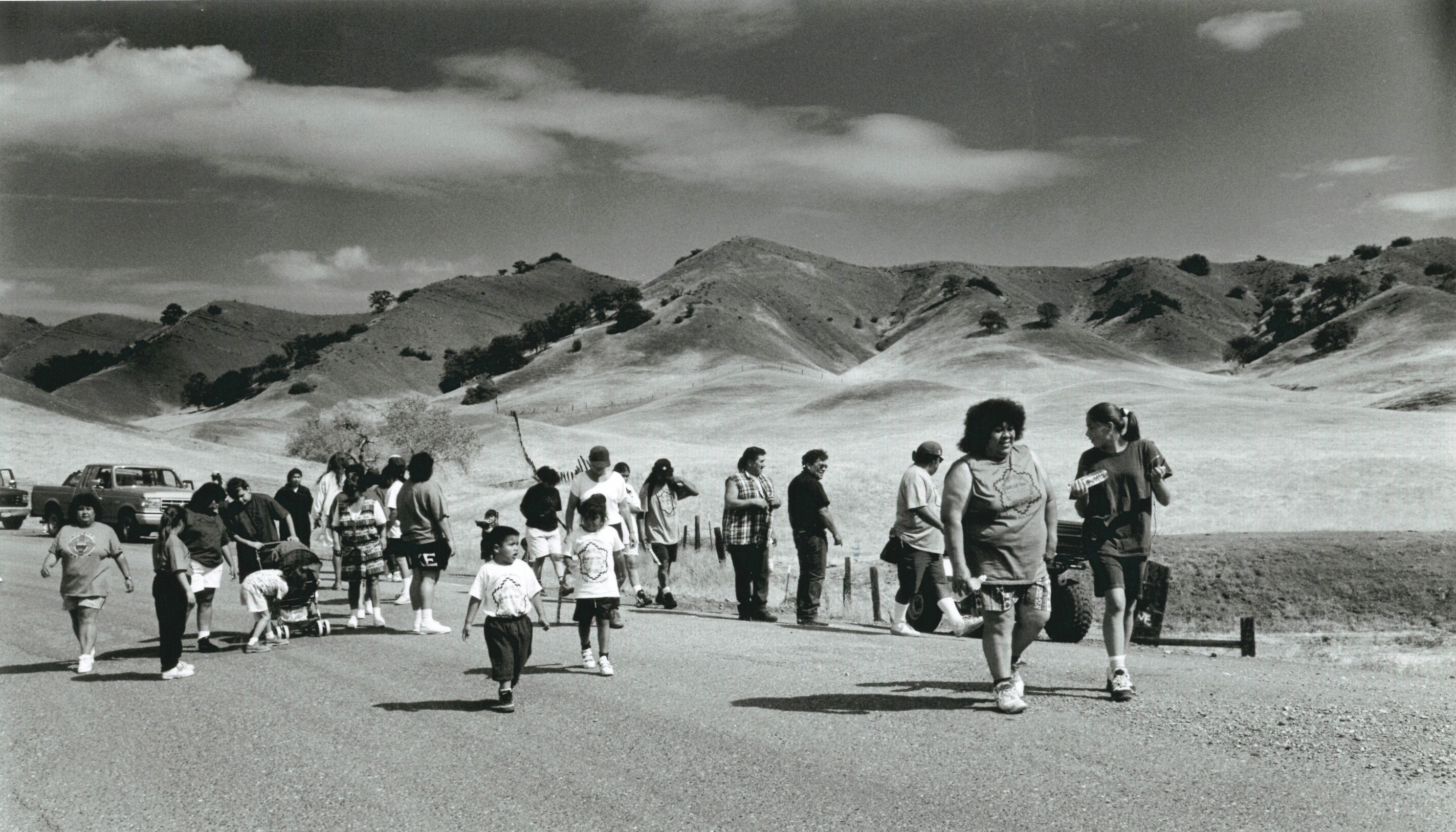
Members of the Round Valley Indian Tribe retrace a forced 1863 relocation to Covelo, California

Shortly after the massacre, during 1851 and 1852, four reservations for the Pomo were established by the United States government in California. Pomo were also part of the forced relocation known as the "Marches to Round Valley" in 1856, conducted by the U.S. federal government. By using bullwhips and guns, white settlers demanded relocation to reservations of the Pomo Indian. The justification given was that to protect their culture, the Pomo Indians had to be removed from their ancestral land.

Richerson & Richerson stated that before the European conquests there was an estimated 3,000 Pomo Indians that lived at Clear Lake; after all of the death, disease, and killings, there were only about 400 Pomo Indians left.

One ghost town in the Lake Sonoma Valley excavations was identified as Amacha, built for 100 people but hardly used. Elder natives of the region remember their grandfathers hid at Amacha in the mid-1850s, trying to evade the colonizing settlers. They tell that one day soldiers took all the people in the village to government lands and burned the village houses.

From 1891 to 1935, starting with National Thorn, the artist Grace Hudson painted more than 600 portraits, mainly of Pomo individuals living near her in the Ukiah area. Her style was sympathetic and poignant, as she portrayed domestic native scenes that would have been fast disappearing in that time.

== Population ==
=== Demographics ===
In 1770 there were about 8,000 Pomo people; in 1851 population was estimated between 3,500 and 5,000; and in 1880 estimated at 1,450. Anthropologist Samuel Barrett estimated a population of 747 in 1908, but that is probably low; fellow anthropologist Alfred L. Kroeber reported 1,200 Pomo counted in the 1910 Census. According to the 1930 Census there were 1,143 Pomo, and by the 1990 Census there were 4,766.

According to the 2010 United States Census, there are 10,308 Pomo people in the United States. Of these, 8,578 reside in California.

=== Languages ===
Pomo, also known as Pomoan or less commonly Kulanapan, is a language family that includes seven distinct and mutually unintelligible languages, including Northern Pomo, Northeastern Pomo, Eastern Pomo, Southeastern Pomo, Central Pomo, Southern Pomo, and Kashaya. John Wesley Powell classified the language family as Kulanapan in 1891, using the name first introduced by George Gibbs in 1853. This name for the language family is derived from the name of one Eastern Pomo village on the south shore of Clear Lake. Stephen Powers (1877) was the first to refer to this entire language family with the name "Pomo", and the geographic names that have been used to refer to the seven individual Pomoan languages (e.g. Southeastern Pomo) were introduced by Samuel Barrett (1908).

The Pomoan languages became severely endangered after European-American colonization of their native territory. Contacts with Russians, the Spanish, and Euro-Americans have impacted these languages, and many are no longer spoken due to language shift to English, accelerated by policies such as the 1887 ban on the teaching in Native American languages put into place by John DeWitt Clinton Atkins. There are about twelve Pomo language varieties that are still in use by Pomo people. One, xay tsnu, which is spoken by Elem Pomo, is in the process of revival due to efforts by Clear Lake Pomo Cultural Preservation Foundation.

== Culture ==
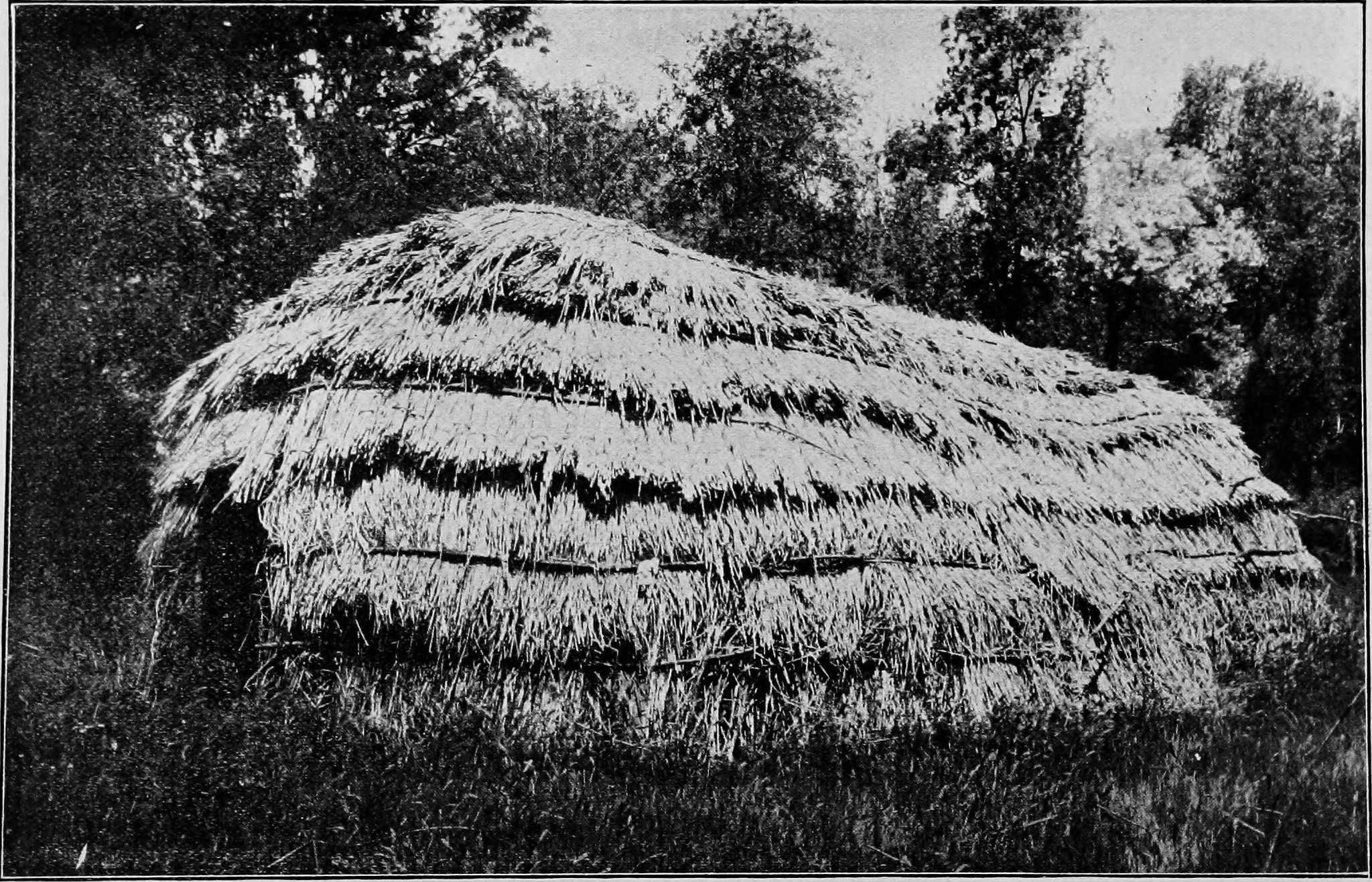
Pomo house, of wicker-work

The Pomo Indian cultures are several ethnolinguistic groups that make up a single language family in Northern California. Pomo cultures originally encompassed hundreds of independent communities.

Like many other Native groups, the Pomo Indians of Northern California relied upon fishing, hunting, and gathering for their daily food supply. They ate salmon, wild greens, gnats, mushrooms, berries, grasshoppers, rabbits, rats, and squirrels. Acorns were the most important staple in their diet. The division of labor in Pomo Indian communities typically involved gathering and preparation of plant-based foods by women, while men were hunters and fishers.

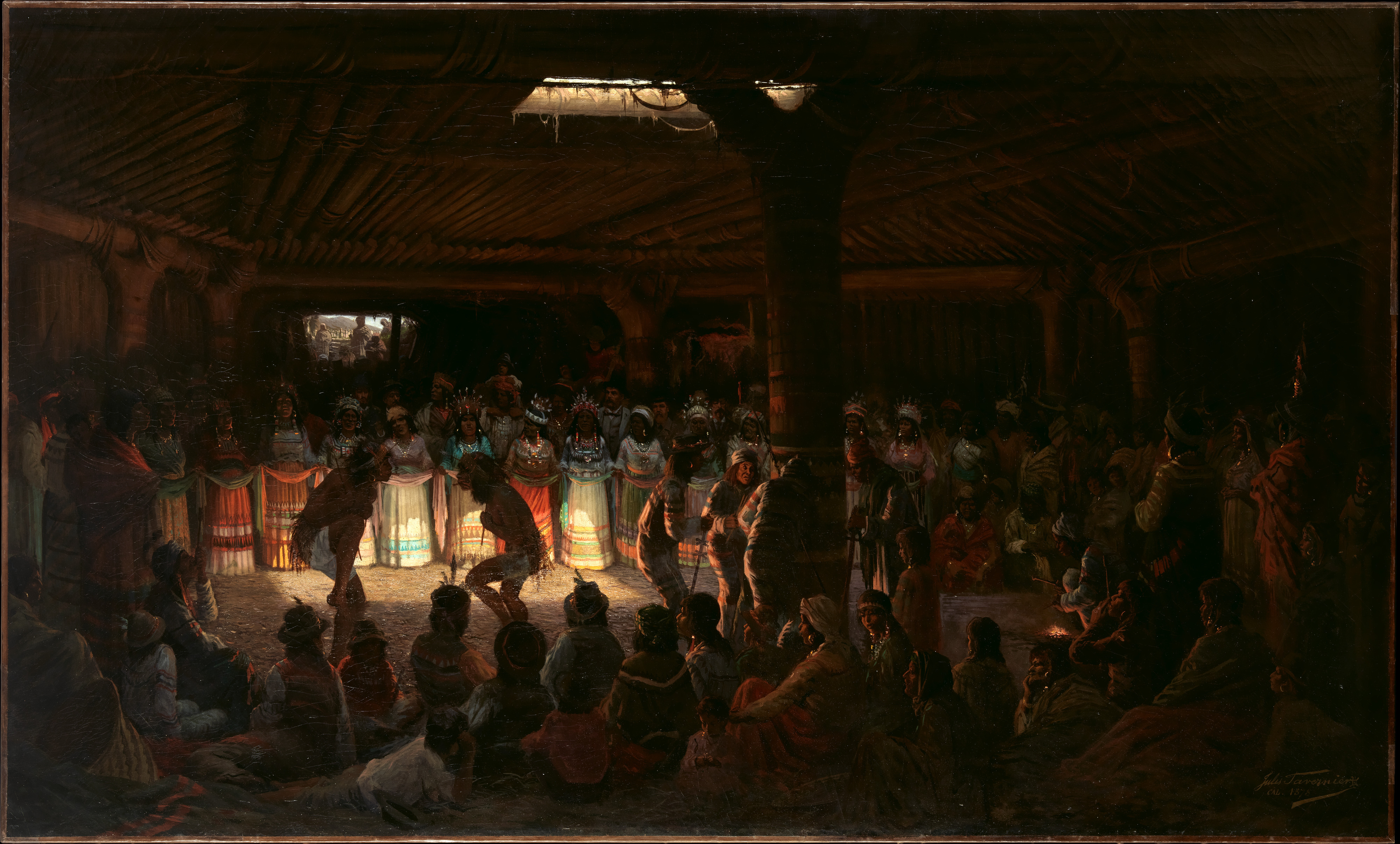
A Pomo religious dance near Clear Lake painted by Jules Tavernier in 1878

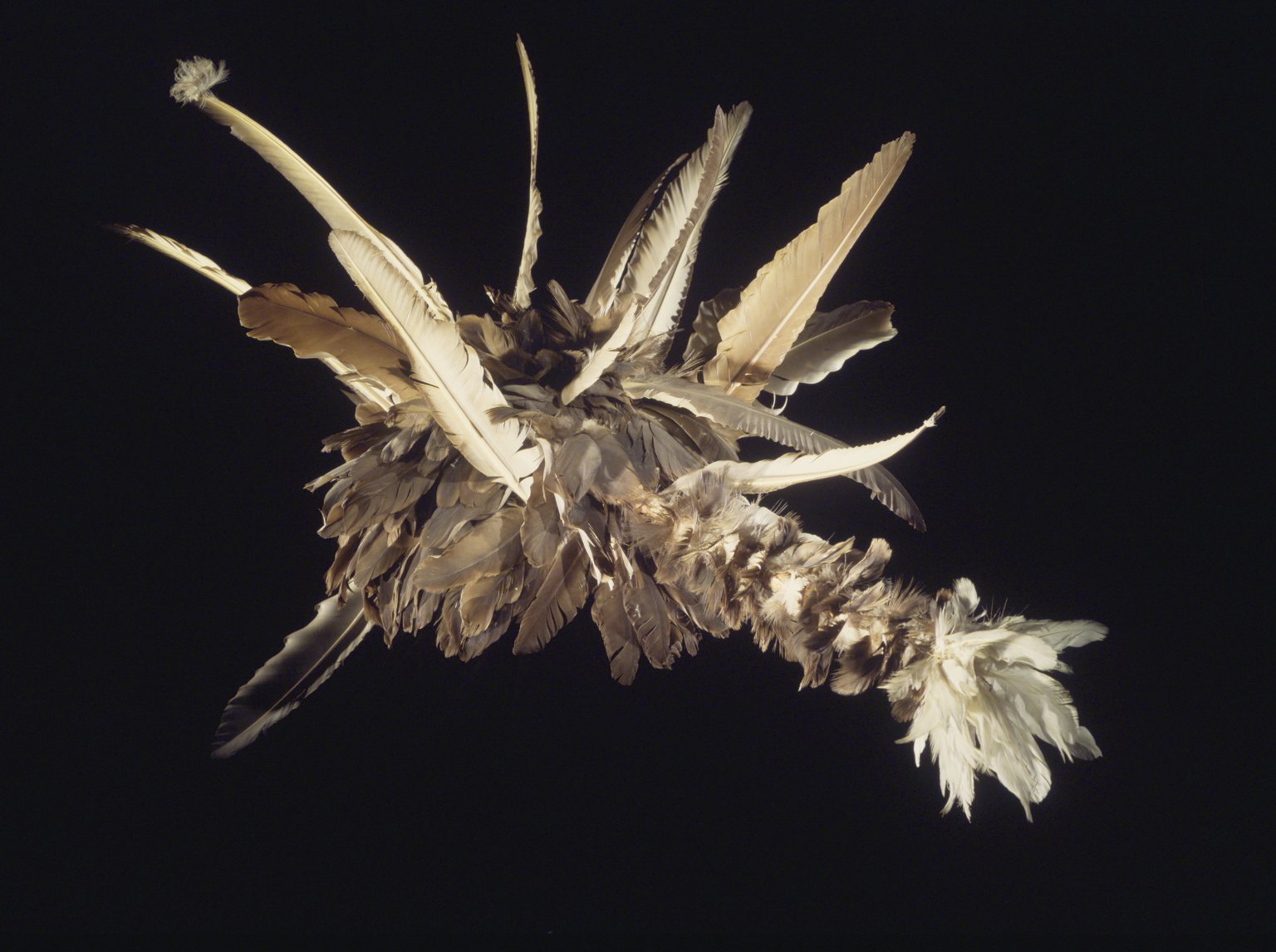
Doctor's Headdress (guk-tsu-shua), Pomo (Native American), 1906–1907, Brooklyn Museum

=== Religion ===
The Pomo people participated in shamanism; one form this took was the Kuksu religion, which was held by people in Central and Northern California. It included elaborate acting and dancing ceremonies in traditional costume, an annual mourning ceremony, puberty rites of passage, shamanic intervention with the spirit world, and an all-male society that met in subterranean dance rooms. The Pomo believed in a supernatural being, the Kuksu or Guksu (depending on their dialect), who lived in the south and who came during ceremonies to heal their illnesses, along with spirits from six cardinal directions, and Coyote as their ancestor and creator god. Medicine men dressed up as Kuksu, their interpretation of a healer spirit.

In 1872, the first Ghost Dance was introduced to the Pomo by a Wintun dreamer and quickly spread. The initial introduction was of the Earth Lodge cult derivation which had begun in Wintu lands, with Bole Maru appearing in Patwin lands and spreading to the Pomo as well soon after. In 1874, the Big Head cult grew out of Bole Maru, but with less of a focus on dreamers and their visions, which spread all the way north to the Shasta. While the Earth Lodge cult and Big Head cult died out pretty quickly, Bole Maru stuck around and has continued to be practiced since, though Mabel McKay, the last Pomo dreamer, died in 1993.

=== Traditional narratives ===
The record of Pomo myths, legends, tales, and histories is extensive. The body of narratives is classed within the Central California cultural pattern.

=== Ethnobotany ===
Carex roots are used to make baskets, and used to tend fishing traps. They are also used to make torches.

== Basket weaving tradition ==
Pomo baskets made by Pomo Indian women of Northern California are recognized worldwide for their exquisite appearance, range of technique, fineness of weave, and diversity of form and use. While women mostly made baskets for cooking, storing food, and religious ceremonies, Pomo men also made baskets for fishing weirs, bird traps, and baby baskets.

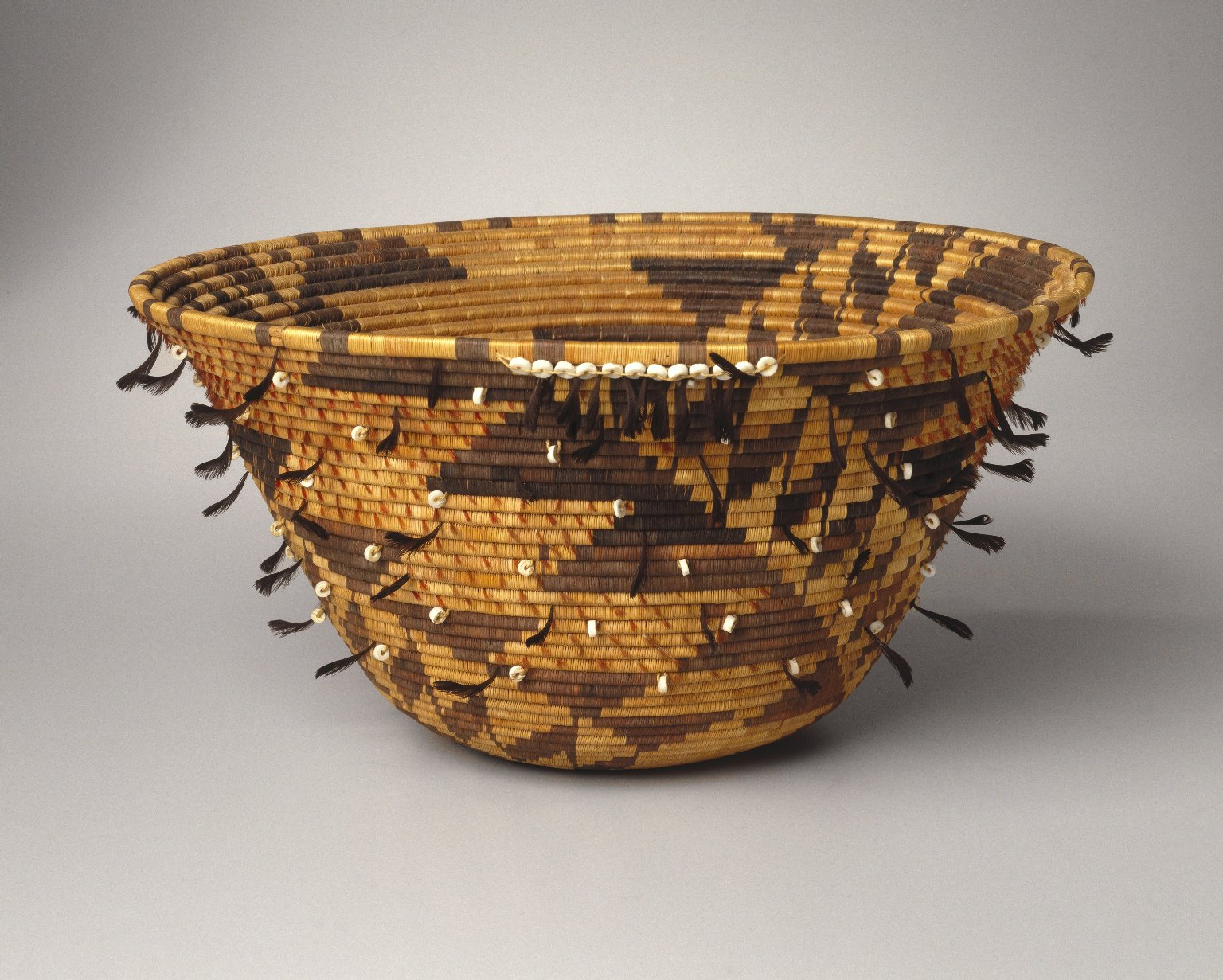
Girl's Coiled Dowry or Puberty Basket (kol-chu or ti-ri-bu-ku), late 19th century, Brooklyn Museum

Making the baskets required great skill and knowledge in collecting and preparing the needed materials. Materials for weaving baskets changed with the seasons and years. The Pomo usually covered a basket completely with the vivid red feathers of the pileated woodpecker until the surface resembled the smoothness of the bird itself. With the feathers, 30–50 to every inch, beads were fastened to the basket's border and hung pendants of polished abalone shell from the basket itself. Pomo women sometimes spent months or years making such gift baskets.

The materials used to make the baskets—including, but not limited to, swamp canes, saguaro cactuses, rye grass, black ash, willow shoots, sedge roots, the bark of redbud, the root of bulrush, and the root of the gray pine—were harvested annually. After being picked, the materials are dried, cleaned, split, soaked, and dyed. Sometimes the materials are also boiled over a fire and set in the sun to dry.

Women traditionally wove Pomo baskets with great care and technique. The three different techniques of Pomo basket weaving are plaiting, coiling, and twining. One drying method was wrapping maiden fern in blue clay and placing underground for several days. This prevented fading in the sun or when cooking mush.

There are many different designs that are woven into the baskets that signify different cultural meanings. For example, the Dau is a pattern woven into a basket by creating a small change in the stitching to create a small opening between two stitches. The Dau is the design that is also called the Spirit Door. This Spirit Door allows good spirits to come and circulate inside of the basket while the good or bad spirits are released.

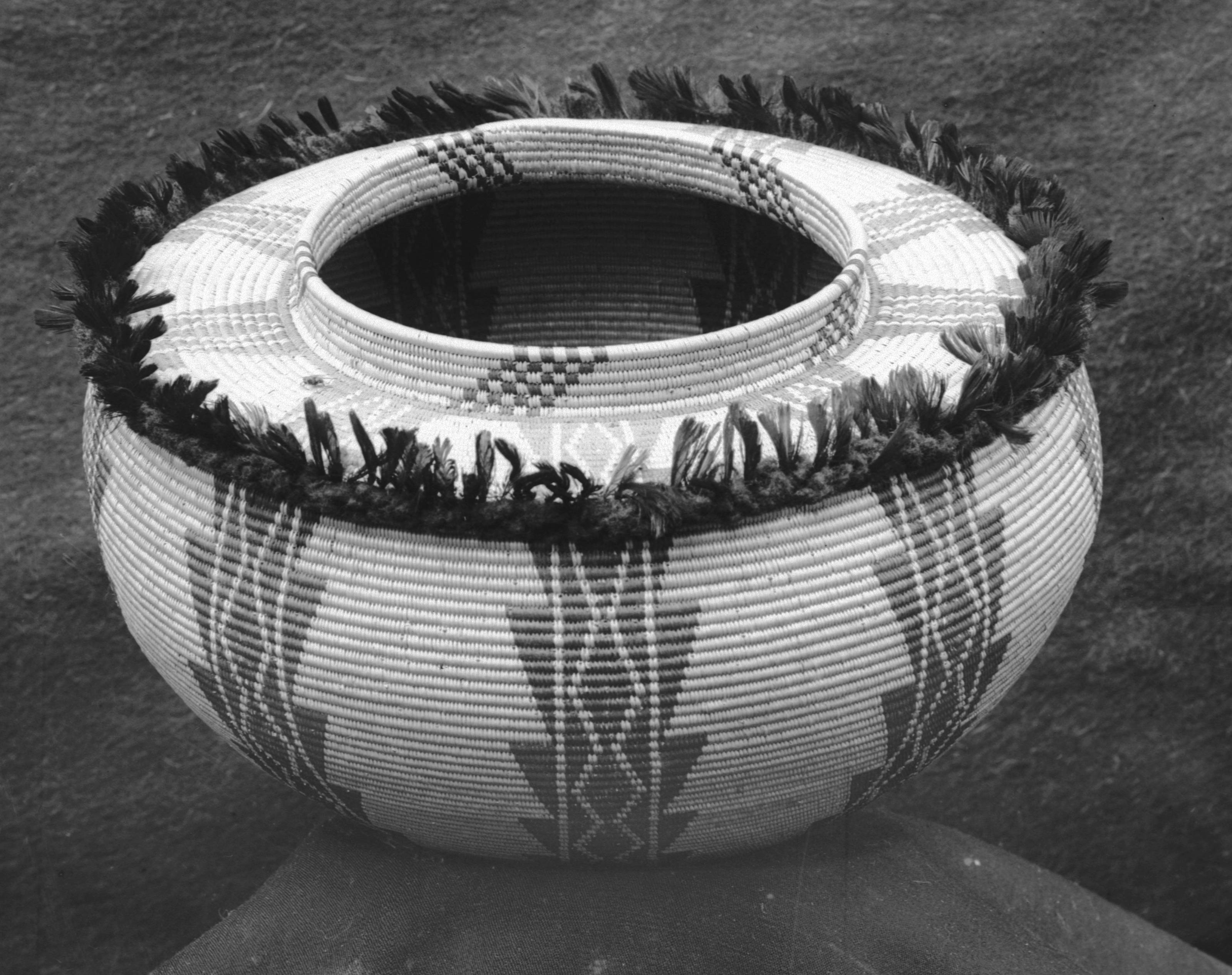
Pomo basket on display, ca.1900

Although baskets were made for decorating homes and as gifts, they were centrally used in Pomo daily life as well. Basket weaving is considered sacred to the Pomo tribe and baskets were produced for a variety of purposes. Pomo children were cradled in baskets, acorns (a major food staple to the Pomo) were harvested in great conical burden baskets, and food was stored, cooked, and served in baskets—some even being watertight. There were even "baskets" that were made as boats to be pushed by men to carry women across rivers.

=== Post-contact ===
A commercial market for authentic baskets developed in the latter part of the 19th century, lasting from about 1876 to the 1930s. Two Pomo people who capitalized on this market were William Ralganal Benson and his wife, Mary Knight Benson and the Bensons may have been the first California Indians who supported themselves solely by crafting and selling their baskets to collectors and museums.

Even though most of their original land was taken over, this was the first turning point for the Pomo people. They had finally escaped the harsh road they were once a part of, and even though they had to settle on poor, isolated land, they finally got to make a stride towards tradition and basket weaving. From 1852 to 1878, many Pomo Indians tried to rekindle their cultures and find peace to what had happened to them. Many people let this time be a learning and spiritual time, where they could have visions and see what the future would have in store. It was a time to build, a time to connect, a time of hope, and a time of change.

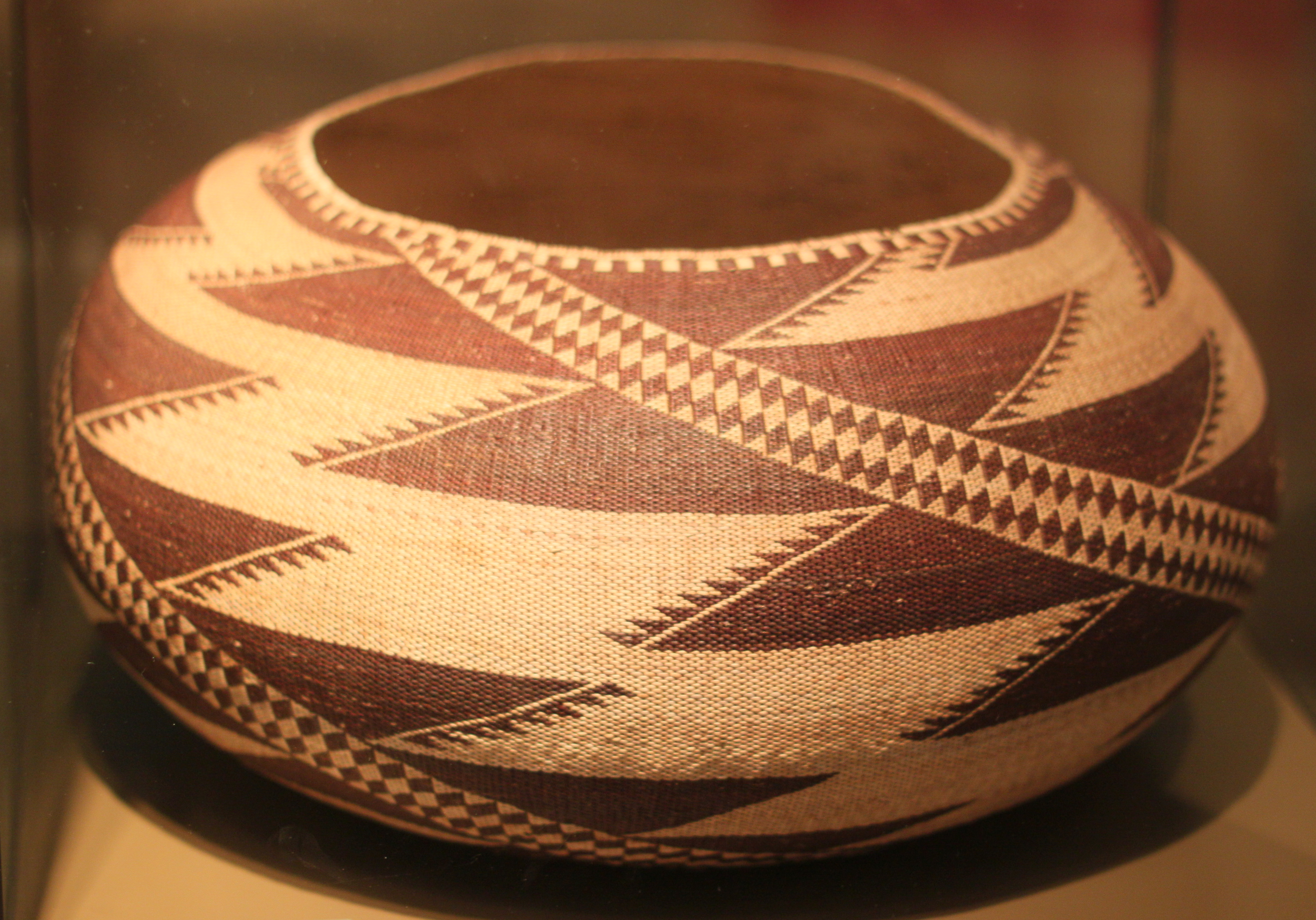
Pomo basket (collected in 1905) in the Ethnological Museum of Berlin

The Pomo Indians did not have enough money to buy land. The Pomo men decided to work for ranchers and the woman went back to making baskets. The "white" people loved the baskets, especially the designer, feathered ones, which led to a basketry movement. Finally, in 1878, the Pomo Indians bought their first piece of land in California. Paula Giese noted, "In 1878, a group of Northern Pomo people bought 7 acres in Coyote Valley. In 1880, another Northern Pomo group bought 100 acres along Ackerman Creek (now known as Pinoleville)". In 1881, Yokaya Rancheria was financed by central Pomo people. Once the Pomo Indians had bought the land, it was time to make money.

Baskets were in so much demand at this point, even though they were once used for trade and bartering with other tribes and people, they now became the Pomo people's way to make money and build their newly found empires. Women had preserved Pomo basket weaving traditions, which made a huge change for the Pomo people. The baskets were wanted all over California; it was a piece of art that traders wanted. Grandmothers and daughters taught other Pomo women, who had lost the tradition of basket weaving, how to make the all-powerful baskets.

Within this time period in addition to basket weaving, the Pomo also manufactured elaborate jewelry made from abalone and clamshells. Assembled during the winter, during the summer the Pomo would travel from various sites along the coast where they would fish and gather all of their materials needed to create their jewelry. The Pomo Indians would create stunning, beautiful, and intricate forms of jewelry that were worn during celebrations and rituals, and even given as gifts. Both of these traditions of creation and culture have slowly dispersed and have become less common over the history of the tribe but more evident in today's culture.

=== Basket weaving today ===
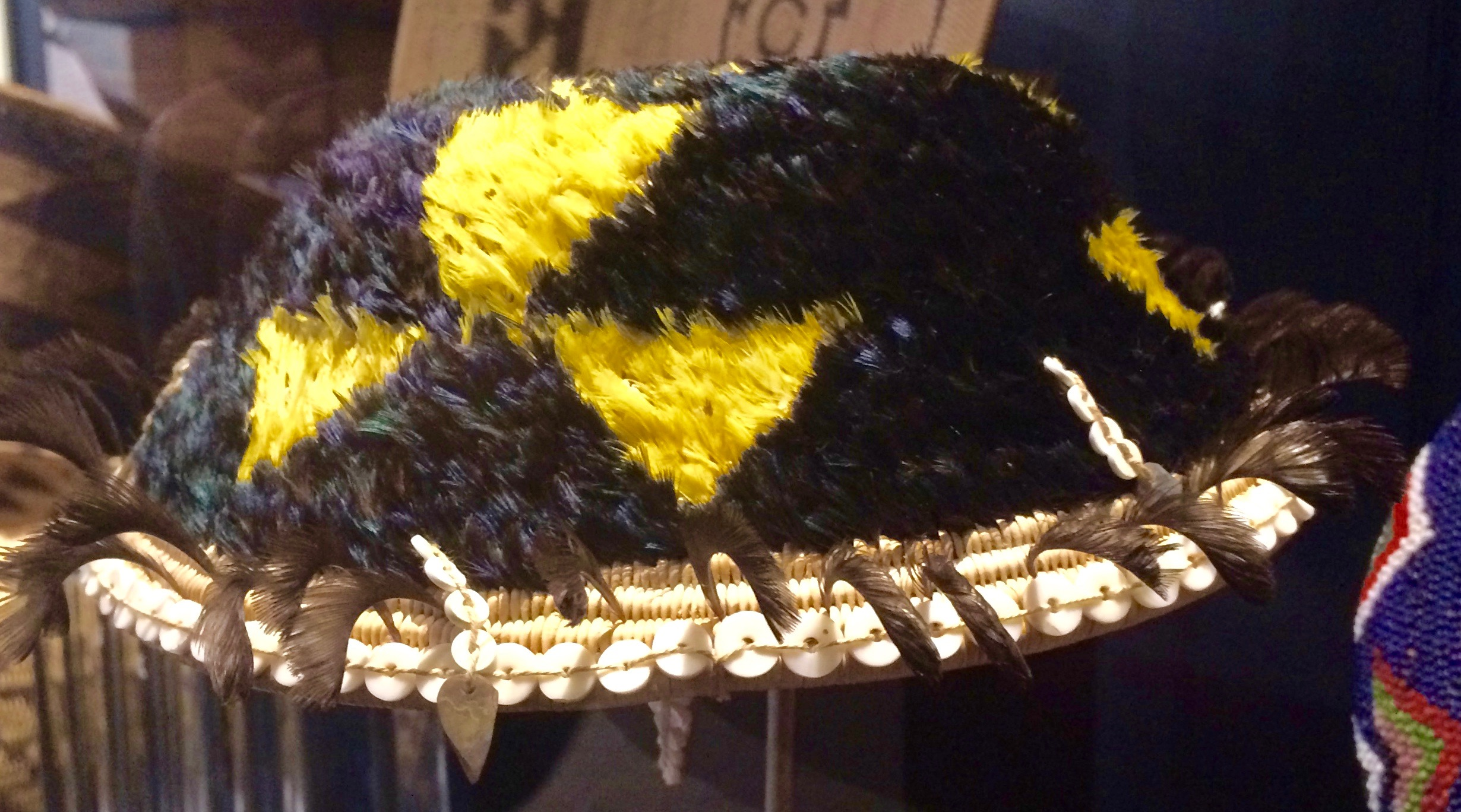
Fully feathered basket curated at the Jesse Peter Multicultural Museum, Santa Rosa College

Pomo basket weaving is still valued and honored today, not only by the Pomo Indians themselves, but also by amateur enthusiasts, buyers for curio dealers, and scientific collectors. The Federated Indians of Graton Rancheria are a federally recognized American Indian tribe of Coast Miwok and Southern Pomo Indians. During the past 30 years, the appreciation for American Indian art has been on the rise, and the art has become in demand – specifically Pomo Indian basketry. Dr. Joallyn Archambault, director of the American Indian Program at the Smithsonian Institution's National Museum of Natural History says: "Since the 1880s, when Pomo baskets first became sought after, the Pomo have changed their lifestyles enormously." Despite these changes, Pomo basket weavers are still heralded and praised within the community for their artistic ability and skill.

One of those basket weavers is Julia F. Parker. She is a master weaver, having woven under Lucy Telles. Her childhood was rough, constantly moving around until boarding school after her parents' death at 6. Lucy had taught Julia because of her perceived interest in preserving Indian culture and specifically basketry. Julia Parker became a cultural demonstrator after Lucy Telles died in 1956. She continued in her studies and later studied Pomo basketry with Pomo master weaver Elsie Allen (1899–1990) at Ukiah and several others. Julia belongs to the Miwok Pomo and Federated Indians of Graton Rancheria. Many of her baskets are in museums in Yosemite, Mono Lake and other museums; she even presented her baskets to Queen Elizabeth II.

They wove baskets from sedge root, willow shoots and roots, bulrush or blackroot, redbud shoots, and sometimes bracken fern and a variety of colorful bird feathers, abalone and other types of shells, or magnesite beads and sometimes glass beads. Redbud shoots, used for the darker reddish colors in basket designs are gathered in October. Good redbud is hard to obtain around Ukiah, so it is usually found at Clear Lake. All these materials are gathered with a thankful heart and the gatherers talk continuously to the plants. They were, after all, living things that were giving themselves for something useful and beautiful. In order to preserve the soil and creek banks, sedge gathering was done with care. The commonly held decision would be leaving behind about half of what was found. Dyeing of the bulrush root takes about three to six months in a concoction of black walnuts, rusty metal and ashes in water.

Despite exploitation by collectors and dealers for profit, Pomo women continued basket weaving as it provided income when hunting and gathering had become less feasible.

== Villages and communities ==
=== Federally recognized tribes ===
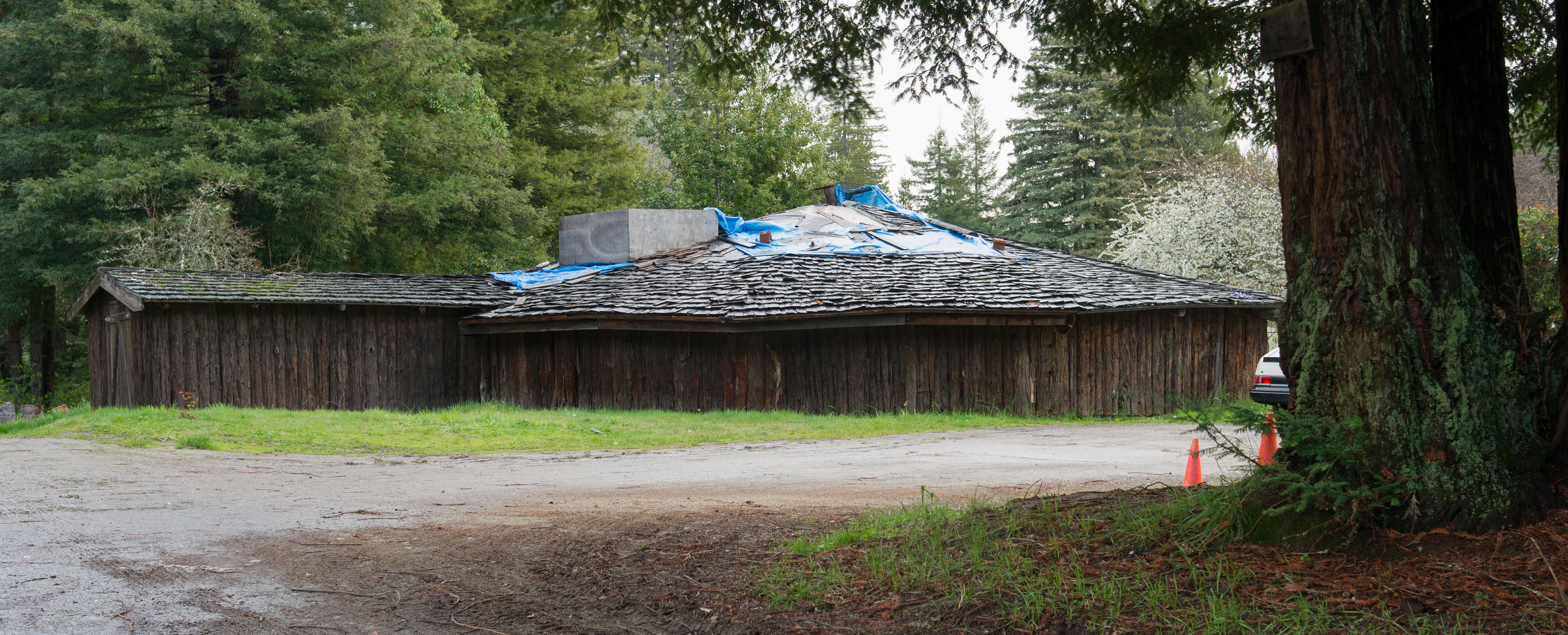
A Pomo roundhouse today

Today, federally recognized tribes have sovereignty and relations with the United States federal government. Classified as "domestic dependent nations," these tribes are under the jurisdiction of the federal government, but with some autonomy from their respective states, including California.

Federally recognized Pomo tribes are based in Sonoma, Lake, and Mendocino counties. They include the following tribes:

- Big Valley Band of Pomo Indians of the Big Valley Rancheria
- Cloverdale Rancheria of Pomo Indians of California
- Coyote Valley Band of Pomo Indians of California
- Dry Creek Rancheria of Pomo Indians of California
- Elem Indian Colony of Pomo Indians of the Sulphur Bank Rancheria
- Federated Indians of Graton Rancheria (a tribe of Coast Miwok and Southern Pomo)
- Guidiville Rancheria of California
- Habematolel Pomo of Upper Lake
- Hopland Band of Pomo Indians of the Hopland Rancheria
- Kashia Band of Pomo Indians of the Stewarts Point Rancheria
- Koi Nation of the Lower Lake Rancheria
- Lytton Rancheria of California
- Manchester Band of Pomo Indians of the Manchester Rancheria
- Middletown Rancheria of Pomo Indians of California
- Pinoleville Pomo Nation
- Potter Valley Tribe
- Redwood Valley Rancheria of Pomo Indians of California
- Robinson Rancheria of Pomo Indians of California
- Round Valley Indian Tribes of the Round Valley Reservation (a confederation of several tribes, including Pomo)
- Scotts Valley Band of Pomo Indians of California
- Sherwood Valley Rancheria of Pomo Indians of California

Other self-identified Native American groups are not federally recognized.

=== California Rancheria Termination Acts ===
Many Pomo were impacted by the California Rancheria Termination Acts and lost lands due to lack of understanding the tax system, along with predation by merchants who took advantage of land-rich but cash-poor tribal members. Along with losing their lands, the tribes lost their status as federally recognized tribes and the ability to access federal clinics that served other federally recognized tribes. In a decision dated July 19, 1983 the United States District Court for the Northern District of California restored the status of 17 California rancherias in Hardwick v. United States.

=== Historical groups ===
The Pomo people were traditionally divided into several large groupings, each speaking its own language. While these had no overarching governance structure and villages were politically independent, they had some cultural differences and were recognizable as units to those who lived in them:

- Kashia (Southwestern Pomo)
- Southern Pomo
- Central Pomo
- Northern Pomo
- Tceefoka (Northeastern or Salt Pomo)
- Eastern Pomo (Clear Lake Pomo), spoke Bahtssal
- Elem Pomo (Southeastern Pomo)

The following historical list of Pomo villages and tribes is taken largely from John Wesley Powell, 1891:

- Balló Kaì Pomo, "Oat Valley People"(Potter Valley, Mendocino County)
- Batemdikáyi
- Búldam Pomo (Rio Grande or Big River)
- Chawishek
- Choam Chadila Pomo (Capello)
- Chwachamajù
- Dápishul Pomo (Redwood Canyon)
- Eastern People (Clear Lake about Lakeport)
- Erío (mouth of Russian River)
- Erússi (Fort Ross)
- Gallinoméro (better Kainameah, Kianamaras or Licatiuts) (Russian River Valley below Cloverdale and in Dry Creek Valley)
- Gualála (better Ahkhawalalee) (northwest corner of Sonoma County)
- Kabinapek (western part of Clear Lake basin)
- Kaimé (above Healdsburg)
- Kai Pomo (between Eel River and South Fork)
- Kastel Pomo (between Eel River and South Fork)
- Kato Pomo, "Lake People" (Clear Lake)
- Komácho (Anderson and Rancheria Valleys)
- Kulá Kai Pomo (Sherwood Valley)
- Kulanapo (Clear Lake)
- Láma (Russian River Valley)
- Misálamag[-u]n or Musakak[-u]n (above Healdsburg)
- Mitoám Kai Pomo, "Wooded Valley People" (Little Lake)
- Poam Pomo
- Senel (Russian River Valley)
- Shódo Kaí Pomo (Coyote Valley)
- Síako (Russian River Valley)
- Sokóa (Russian River Valley)
- Yokáya (or Ukiah) Pomo, "Lower Valley People" (Ukiah City)
- Yusâl (or Kámalel) Pomo, "Ocean People" (on coast and along Usal Creek)

Non-Pomo villages and tribes considered "Pomo" in Powell, 1891:

- Batemdikayi (name of a Cahto/Kato Athabaskan band)
- Kai Pomo ('grass people', the Cahto/Kato Athabaskan band of Long Valley)
- Kamalel Pomo ('ocean people', Coast Yuki people, possibly also the Sinkyone Athabaskan people of Usal Creek area)
- Kastel Pomo (Wailaki Athabaskan bands, possibly including some of the northern Cahto bands)
- Kato Pomo ('lake people', the Cahto/Kato Athabaskan band of Cahto Valley)
- Yusal Pomo ('Usal people', the Sinkyone Athabaskan people of Usal Creek area)

== Notable Pomo people ==
- William Ralganal Benson (1862–1937)
- Mary Knight Benson (1877–1930)
- Elmer Busch (1890–1949)
- Laura Somersal (1892–1990), basket weaver
- Elsie Allen (1899–1990)
- Essie Pinola Parrish (1903–1979)
- Mabel McKay (1907–1993)
- Julia F. Parker (born 1928)
- Luwana Quitiquit (1941–2010), basket weaver who created a program to revive the craft
- Susan Billy (born 1951), basket weaver
- Chuck Billy (born 1962), singer of the metal band Testament
- Danielle Forward, software engineer and Indigenous activist
- Franklin Dollar, physicist

== See also ==
- Point Arena Rancheria Roundhouse, also known as "Manchester Rancheria Roundhouse", listed on the National Register of Historic Places
- Frog Woman Rock
- Lake Mendocino
- Santa Rosa Creek
