= Stephen Powers =

American historian

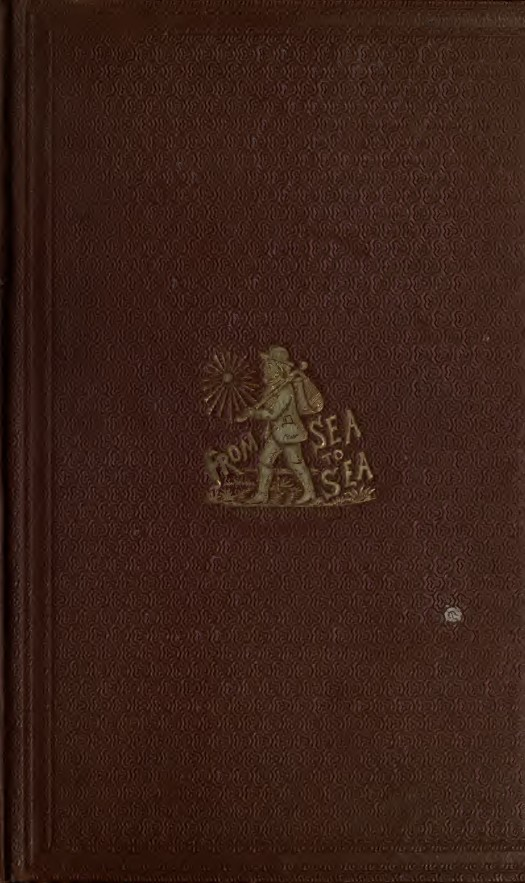
Afoot and Alone: A Walk from Sea to Sea by the Southern Route. Adventures and Observations in Southern California, New Mexico, Arizona, Texas, etc. (1872)

Stephen Powers (1840–1904) was an American journalist, ethnographer, and historian of Native American tribes in California. He traveled extensively to study and learn about their cultures, and wrote notable accounts of them. His articles were first published over a series of years in the Overland Monthly journal, but collected in The Tribes of California (1877) published by the US Geological Survey.

== Early years ==
Stephen Powers was born in Waterford, Ohio. He attended and graduated from the University of Michigan in 1863.

During the American Civil War years, Powers served as a Union Army correspondent for the Cincinnati Commercial newspaper.

In 1869 Powers left Ohio for the West. He walked across the Southern and Western United States to his destination of San Francisco, California. After arriving, Powers wrote about his experiences and observations, and had his book published in 1871.

== California Native Americans ==
Between 1871 and 1876, Stephen Powers traveled thousands of miles on foot and horseback through the Northern, Central Coast, and great Central Valley regions of California. Powers become very familiar with the various distinctive Native Californian Indian population groups and tribes. He studied their lives and crafts including: spiritual and religious beliefs and ceremonies; indigenous languages, narratives and mythology; art forms of basketry, rock art, carvings, pottery and weaving; dwellings and belongings.

He also studied their ways of interacting with plants and animals for food, clothing, medicines, and tools. Powers observed and documented their adaptations to circumstances from a hundred years of homeland invasions by Spanish, Mexican, and European-American immigrants settling on their land, and the resulting consequences.

Stephen Powers published his diverse ethnographic studies in a series of articles, which appeared primarily in the Overland Monthly journal from 1872 to 1877.

=== Tribes of California ===
Stephen Powers subsequently reworked his Tribes of California articles, notes and other material for a book's publication. It was published in 1877 as part of the federally sponsored Geographical and Geological Survey of the Rocky Mountain Region series edited by the renowned western geologist John Wesley Powell, then Director of the Geological Survey of the Department of Interior, as well as the Bureau of Ethnological Studies at the Smithsonian Institution.

Alfred L. Kroeber, an anthropologist, director of the University of California, Berkeley's Museum of Anthropology and the dean of Native Californian ethnologists, said Stephen Powers' book Tribes of California: "..., it will always remain the best introduction to the subject."

== Legacy ==
His book and articles are held by his alma mater, the University of Michigan, which has put them online as part of the Making of America collaboration among major universities.

== See also ==
- Population of Native California
  - Survey of California and Other Indian Languages
  - Traditional narratives (Native California)
  - Category: Native American tribes in California
  - Category: Native American history of California
- California mission clash of cultures
- Alfred Robinson - "Life in California" 1846
