= Demographics of California =

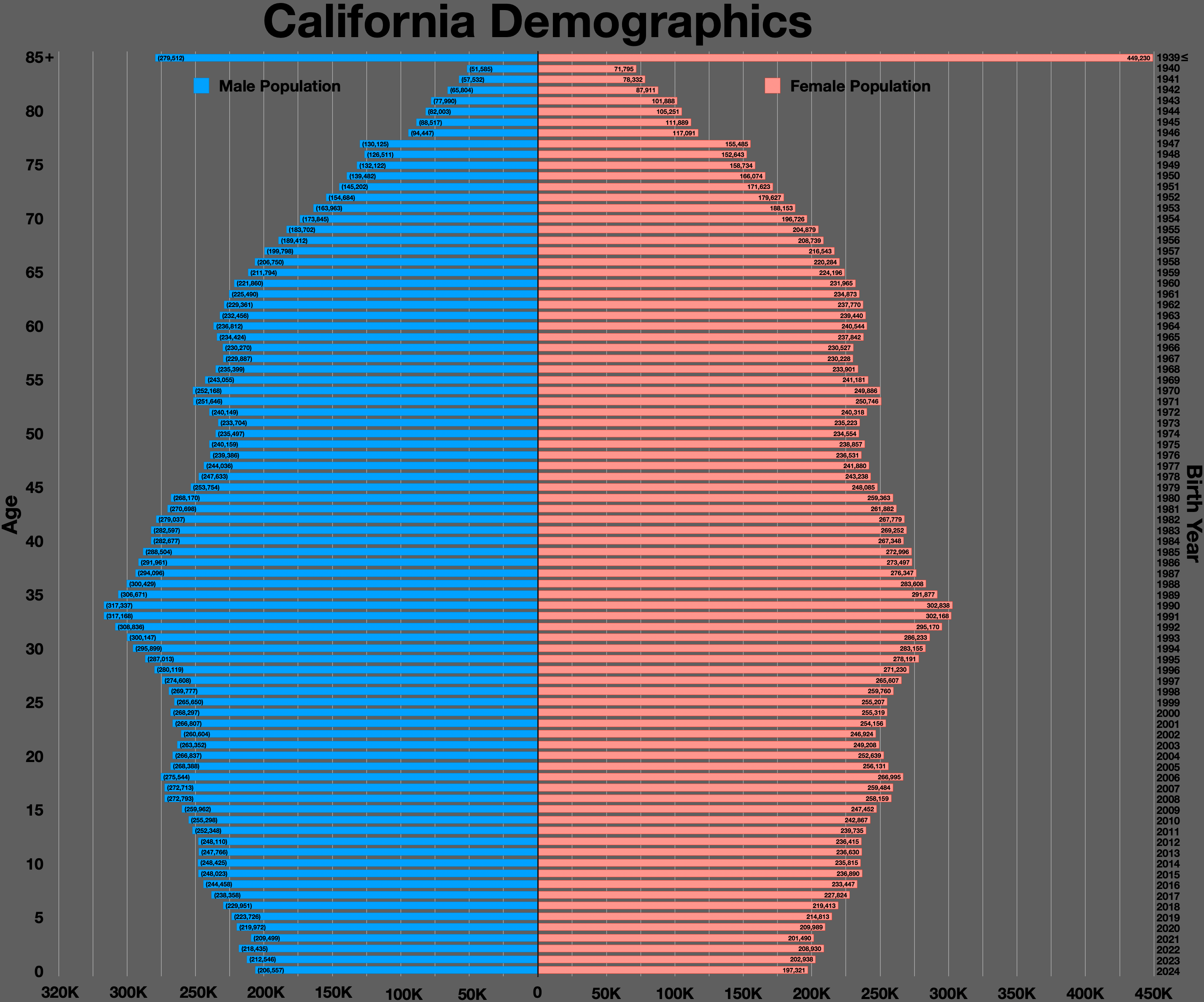
California population pyramid

California is the most populous U.S. state, with an estimated population of 38.9 million as of 2023. The state has people from a wide variety of ethnic, racial, national, and religious backgrounds.

== Population ==
Historical population
Census	Pop.	Note	%±
1850	92,597		—
1860	379,994		310.4%
1870	560,247		47.4%
1880	864,694		54.3%
1890	1,213,398		40.3%
1900	1,485,053		22.4%
1910	2,377,549		60.1%
1920	3,426,861		44.1%
1930	5,677,251		65.7%
1940	6,907,387		21.7%
1950	10,586,223		53.3%
1960	15,717,204		48.5%
1970	19,953,134		27.0%
1980	23,667,902		18.6%
1990	29,760,021		25.7%
2000	33,871,648		13.8%
2010	37,253,956		10.0%
2020	39,538,223		6.1%
2025 (est.)	39,355,309		−0.5%
Sources: 1790–1990, 2000, 2010, 2020, 2025; Chart does not include Indigenous population figures. Studies indicate that the Native American population in California in 1850 was close to 150,000 before declining to 15,000 by 1900.

California is the most populated sub-national entity in North America. If it were an independent country, California would rank 38th in population in the world; within North America, it would be the fourth largest, behind the US, Mexico and Canada. (Note: From the 1980s until mid-2023, California had a larger population than Canada.) Its population is one third larger than that of the next most populous state, Texas. California surpassed New York to become the most populous state in 1962. California's population growth has slowed dramatically in the 21st century. In 2010, the state's five most populous counties were Los Angeles, San Diego, Orange, Riverside, and San Bernardino, with Riverside County having the largest percentage increase in population. The largest metro areas in California, as of 2010, are Los Angeles, the San Francisco Bay Area, San Diego, the Inland Empire, and Sacramento. From 2006 until 2016, the state lost a net population of about 1 million people from emigration to other states, yet the population of the state continued to grow due to immigration from overseas and more births than deaths.

As of 2006, California had an estimated population of 37,172,015, more than 12 percent of the US population. This includes a natural increase since the last census of 1,557,167 people (i.e., 2,781,539 births minus 1,224,427 deaths) and an increase due to net migration of 751,419 people. Immigration resulted in a net increase of 1,415,879 people, and migration from within the US resulted in a net decrease of 564,100 people. California is the 13th fastest-growing state. As of 2023, the total fertility rate was 1.52 which is on par with Canada.

The center of population of California is located at 35.463595°N 119.325359°W in Kern County, near the town of Shafter.

No single ethnic group forms a majority of California's population, making the state a minority-majority state. Hispanics (of any race) are the largest single ethnic group in the state. Spanish is the state's second most widely spoken language. Areas with especially large Spanish speaking populations include the Los Angeles metropolitan area, the California-Mexico border counties of San Diego and Imperial, and the San Joaquin Valley. Nearly 43% of Californian residents speak a language other than English at home, a proportion far higher than any other state.

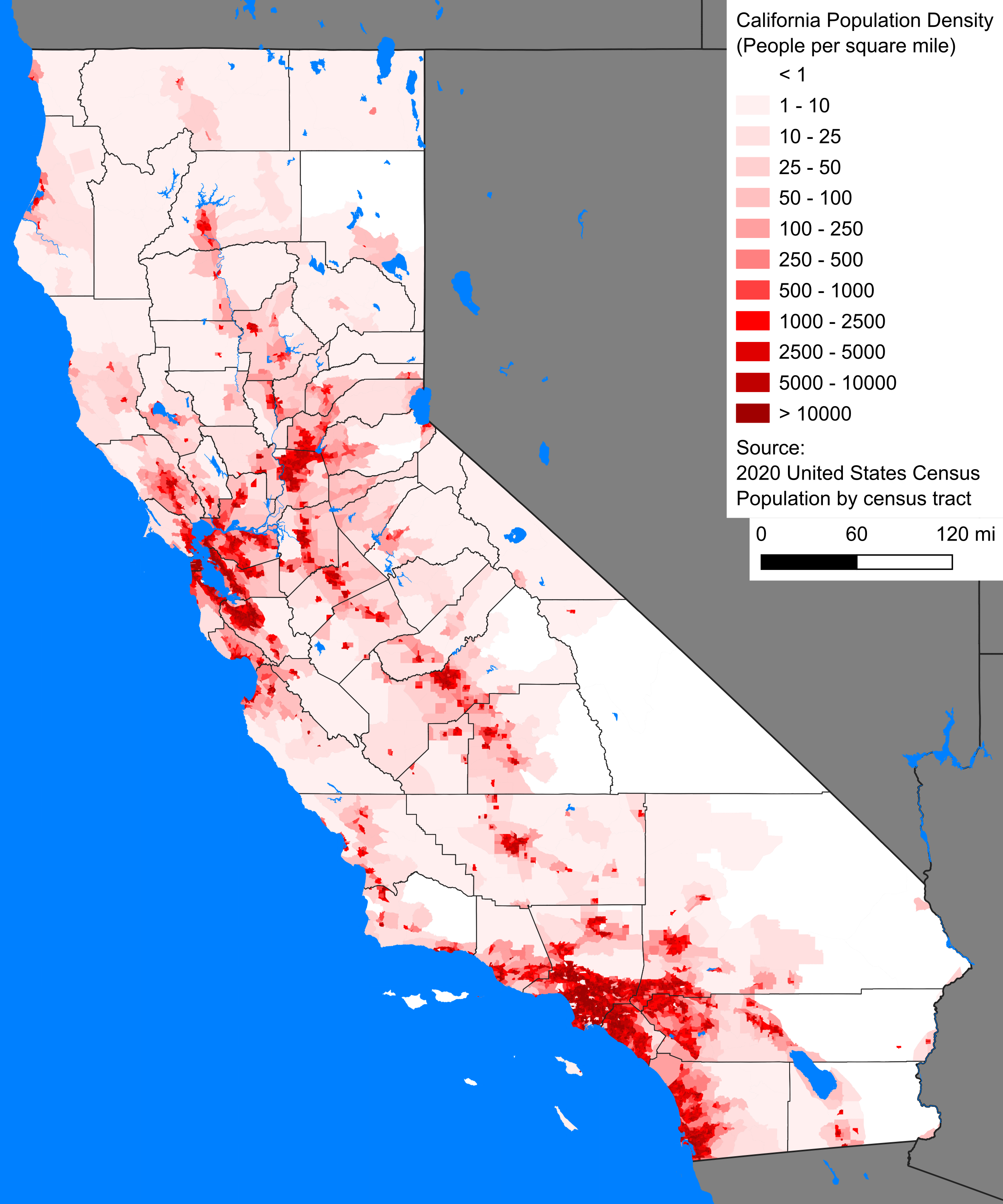
Population density in 2020

In 2011, there were an estimated 2.6 million undocumented immigrants residing in California. California is home to almost 25% of the country's undocumented population, making up 6% of California's residents overall. Two-thirds of California's undocumented population have lived in the state for more than 10 years.

About 52% of California's public school students in the 2011–2012 school year identified themselves as Hispanic or Latino and 26% as non-Hispanic Caucasian. The following ethnic groups made up the rest of the statewide public school student body: Asians (11%), African Americans (7%), Native Americans (0.7%), and Pacific Islanders (0.6%). Students of mixed race made up about 2% of the public schools. Hispanics have made up the majority of the state's public schools since 2010. Los Angeles Unified School District, the largest school district in California and second largest in the nation, is 73% Hispanic, 10% African American, 9% non-Hispanic Caucasian, 6% Asian, 0.5% Native American, and 0.4% Pacific Islander.

The US Census Bureau announced a paltry population growth for the state, resulting in its first loss of a congressional seat. In 2020, amid the COVID-19 pandemic, California's population fell for the first time in history. The state's population declined again in 2021 and 2022. The main causes of the decline are: a high mortality rate, a declining natality, a fall in international migration and emigration to other states. The latter phenomenon is sometimes called California exodus. Population loss was noticed in 34 out of 58 counties in the state between January 2020 and July 2022. According to the California Department of Finance, the state's population will stay constant at around 39.5 million until 2060. In 2020–2021, California saw an annual loss of 398,795 people. Between 2021 and 2022, there was a lower loss in population at 113,649 people. The slowing down of population loss as seen in 2022 would continue into 2023 seeing a loss of 75,423 people making it a 0.2% population loss from the previous year as compared to 2022 having a 0.3% loss in 2023. In the 2024 population estimate from the US Census Bureau, the population of California grew by 232,570 people.

=== Net domestic migration ===
Net domestic migration, California
Year	In-migrants	Out-migrants	Net domestic migration
2010	444,749	573,988	–129,239
2011	468,428	562,343	–93,915
2012	493,641	566,986	–73,345
2013	485,477	581,679	–96,202
2014	513,968	593,308	–79,340
2015	514,477	643,710	–129,233
2016	514,758	657,690	–142,932
2017	523,131	661,026	–137,895
2018	501,023	691,145	–190,122
2019	480,204	653,551	–173,347
2021	433,402	841,065	–407,663
2022	475,803	817,669	–341,866
2023	422,075	690,127	–268,052
2024	409,947	662,053	–252,106

=== Racial and ethnic composition ===
California – Racial and ethnic composition Note: the US Census treats Hispanic/Latino as an ethnic category. This table excludes Latinos from the racial categories and assigns them to a separate category. Hispanics/Latinos may be of any race.
Race / Ethnicity (NH = Non-Hispanic)	Pop 1980	Pop 1990	Pop 2000	Pop 2010	Pop 2020	% 1980	% 1990	% 2000	% 2010	% 2020
White alone (NH)	15,763,992	17,029,126	15,816,790	14,956,253	13,714,587	66.60%	57.22%	46.70%	40.15%	34.69%
Black or African American alone (NH)	1,783,810	2,092,446	2,181,926	2,163,804	2,119,286	7.54%	7.03%	6.44%	5.81%	5.36%
Native American or Alaska Native alone (NH)	201,283	184,065	178,984	162,250	156,085	0.85%	0.62%	0.53%	0.44%	0.39%
Asian alone (NH)	1,253,782	2,710,353	3,648,860	4,775,070	5,978,795	5.30%	9.11%	10.77%	12.82%	15.12%
Native Hawaiian or Pacific Islander alone (NH)	x	x	103,736	128,577	138,167	x	x	0.31%	0.35%	0.35%
Other race alone (NH)	120,704	56,093	71,681	85,587	223,929	0.51%	0.19%	0.21%	0.23%	0.57%
Mixed race or Multiracial (NH)	x	x	903,115	968,696	1,627,722	x	x	2.67%	2.60%	4.12%
Hispanic or Latino (any race)	4,544,331	7,687,938	10,966,556	14,013,719	15,579,652	19.20%	25.83%	32.38%	37.62%	39.40%
Total	23,667,902	29,760,021	33,871,648	37,253,956	39,538,223	100.00%	100.00%	100.00%	100.00%	100.00%

=== 2020 census ===
According to the 2020 US census, California's population was 34.7% Non-Hispanic White, 5.4% Non-Hispanic African American, 0.4% Non-Hispanic Native American, 15.1% Non-Hispanic Asian, 0.4% Non-Hispanic Pacific Islander, 4.1% Non-Hispanic Multiracial, and 39.4% Hispanic or Latino of any race. Hispanics are the largest racial/ethnic group in California. Non-Hispanic Whites have decreased from about 76.3% of the state's population in 1970 to 33.7% in 2022. California is the second-most racially diverse state in the US, after Hawaii. The population of minorities (defined as anyone who is not fully non-Hispanic white) in the US accounted for 139.8 million out of 331.5 million residents in 2020, with 25.8 million, or 18.5% of the total minority population, living in California (2020). While New Mexico has a higher percentages of Hispanics (47.7%), California has the highest total number of Hispanics of any US state, at over 15 million.

California has the highest number and second highest percentage of Asian Americans by state, with 15.5% of the population identifying as Asian alone, and 18.4% identifying as Asian alone or in combination. Only Hawaii has a higher Asian American percentage than California. The highest percent of Asians in California is found in the San Francisco Bay area, where they make up 30% of the total population.

The largest named ancestries in California are Mexican (32.5%), German (6.5%), British (6.0%), Irish (5.6%), Chinese (4.8%), and Filipino (4.4%). There are over 65 other ethnicities with sizable populations in California, including African Americans, Albanians, Arabs, Armenians, Australians, Brazilians, Canadians, Croatians, Guatemalans, Haitians, Iranians/Persians, Italians, Japanese, Koreans, Portuguese (especially in the Northern half of state), Russians, Salvadorans, Serbians, Somalis, and Vietnamese. Both the Los Angeles and San Francisco metro areas have large numbers of residents with African-American, British, Central American, Chinese, Filipino, French, German, Indian, Iranian/Persian, Italian, Mexican, Russian, Scandinavian, and Vietnamese ancestry.

California has the largest total population of non-Hispanic white Americans in the US, totaling over 13.7 million as of the 2020 census, although the share of non-Hispanic whites as a percent of the population, at 34.7%, is the second lowest in the country, after Hawaii. The state has the fifth largest population of African Americans in the US, an estimated 2.1 million residents. California's Asian population is estimated at 7.0 million, almost 30% of the nation's estimated 24 million Asian Americans. California's Native American population of 156,085 is the 4th-largest of any state, behind Oklahoma, Arizona, and New Mexico.

Since the 2000 US census, California has been known as the second state in US history (after Hawaii since its statehood in 1959) to become majority minority (it has since been joined by Texas, Arizona, New Mexico, Nevada, Maryland, and Georgia), and since 2014, the second state, after New Mexico, to have a Latino plurality (of any race). Some projections have showed the possibility of Latinos becoming a majority in the mid 21st century.

==== 2025 American Community Survey one-year estimates ====
Racial Makeup of California (2025): 1. White alone (37.6%); 2. Black alone (5.27%); 3. Native American alone (1.48%); 4. Asian Alone (16.6%); 5. Pacific Islander Alone (0.40%); 6. Other race alone (19.0%); 7. Two or more races (19.7%)	Racial/Ethnic Makeup of California excluding Hispanics from racial categories (2025); NH=Non-Hispanic: 1. White NH (31.6%); 2. Black NH (5.01%); 3. Native American NH (0.37%); 4. Asian NH (16.3%); 5. Pacific Islander NH (0.35%); 6. Other race NH (0.64%); 7. Two or more races NH (4.55%); 8. Hispanic Any Race (41.2%)	Racial Makeup of Hispanics in California (2025): 1. White alone (14.6%); 2. Black alone (0.65%); 3. Native American alone (2.70%); 4. Asian Alone (0.67%); 5. Pacific Islander Alone (0.13%); 6. Other race alone (44.5%); 7. Two or more races (36.8%)

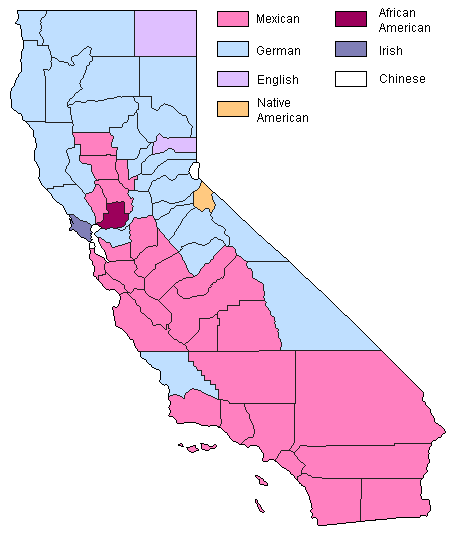
Most common ancestry in each county in 2000

According to 2022 US Census Bureau one-year estimates, California's population by race (where Hispanics are allocated to the individual racial categories) was 38.9% White, 15.5% Asian, 19.5% Other Race, 5.4% Black or African American, 1.3% Native American or Alaskan Native, 0.4% Pacific Islander, and 19.0% Mixed race or Multiracial.

If Hispanics are treated as if a separate race and removed from the racial categories, the breakout is 33.7% Non-Hispanic White, 15.3% Non-Hispanic Asian, 0.6% Non-Hispanic Other Race, 5.2% Non-Hispanic Black, 0.3% Non-Hispanic Native American or Alaskan Native, 0.4% Non-Hispanic Pacific Islander, 4.1% Non-Hispanic Multiracial, and 40.3% Hispanic-Latino (of any race).

Latinos in California primarily identify as Other Race (46.7%) or Multiracial (36.6%), making up the vast majority of individuals in the state who identify as 'some other race'. Smaller amounts of Hispanics identify as white (12.8%), American Indian and Alaskan Native (2.6%), Asian (0.6%), or Hawaiian and Pacific Islander (0.2%).

Racial or Ethnic group	1850	1860	1870	1880	1890	1900	1910	1920	1930	1940	1950	1960	1970	1980	1990	2000	2010	2020
White	99.0%	85.0%	89.1%	88.7%	91.6%	94.5%	95.0%	95.3%	95.3%	95.5%	93.7%	92.0%	89.0%	76.2%	69.0%	59.5%	57.6%	41.2%
Black	1.0%	1.1%	0.8%	0.7%	0.9%	0.7%	0.9%	1.1%	1.4%	1.8%	4.4%	5.6%	7.0%	7.7%	7.4%	6.7%	6.2%	5.7%
Asian	–	9.2%	8.8%	8.7%	6.1%	3.8%	3.4%	3.1%	3.0%	2.4%	1.7%	2.0%	2.8%	5.3%	9.6%	10.9%	13.0%	15.5%
Pacific Islander	–	9.2%	8.8%	8.7%	6.1%	3.8%	3.4%	3.1%	3.0%	2.4%	1.7%	2.0%	2.8%	5.3%	9.6%	0.3%	0.4%	0.4%
Native American	(Note: Although Native Americans were not enumerated in the 1850 census, studies indicate that 150,000 Native Americans lived in the territory of California around 1850, making up a majority of the population at the time. However, this number would decline by over 80% in the following decade due to genocide, war, and diseases brought on by the population influx during the Gold Rush)	4.7% (Note: Only represents the off-reservation Indian population. The total number of Native Americans in California in 1860 is estimated at 30,000, making up nearly 10% of the total population.)	1.3% (Note: Only represents the off-reservation Indian population. The total number of Native Americans in California in 1870 is estimated at roughly 30,000, making up approximately 5% of the total population.)	1.9% (Note: Only represents the off-reservation Indian population. The total number of Native Americans in California in 1880 is estimated at 20,385, making up 2.4% of the total population.)	1.4% (Note: 1890 was the first census year to include a count of the entire Native American population in the state, at 16,624, a nearly 90% decline from the estimated 150,000 Native Americans living in the state in 1850.)	1.0%	0.7%	0.5%	0.3%	0.3%	0.2%	0.2%	0.5%	0.9%	0.8%	1.0%	1.0%	1.6%
Other race	–	–	–	–	–	–	–	–	–	–	–	–	0.7%	10.0%	13.2%	16.8%	17.0%	21.2%
Multiracial	–	–	–	–	–	–	–	–	–	–	–	–	–	–	–	4.7%	4.9%	14.6%
Hispanic (of any race)	–	–	–	–	–	–	2.1% (Note: Estimate based only on population classified as 'Mexican')	3.7%	6.8% (Note: Estimate based only on population classified as 'Mexican' in the 1930 census. Mexican was only counted as a separate race in 1930, with Mexicans being classified as white in later censuses from 1940-1970.)	6.0% (Note: Estimate based on "white persons of Spanish mother tongue." The vast majority of Hispanics in the US were classified as white in the 1940 Census.)	7.2% (Note: Estimate based on census report of "white persons of Spanish surname." The vast majority of Hispanics were classified as white in the 1950 census)	9.1% (Note: Estimate based on census report of "white persons of Spanish surname." The vast majority of Hispanics were classified as white in the 1960 census)	13.7% (Note: First census to include Hispanics of all races as a distinct category)	19.2%	25.8%	32.4%	37.6%	39.4%
Non-Hispanic White							92.9%	91.6%	88.5%	89.5%	86.5%	82.9%	76.3%	66.7%	57.2%	46.7%	40.1%	34.7%
Black (NH)	–	–	–	–	–	–	–	–	–	–	–	–	6.8%	7.5%	7.0%	6.4%	5.8%	5.4%
Asian (NH)	–	–	–	–	–	–	–	–	–	–	–	–	2.7%	5.0%	9.1%	10.8%	12.8%	15.2%
Pacific Islander (NH)	–	–	–	–	–	–	–	–	–	–	–	–	2.7%	5.0%	9.1%	0.3%	0.4%	0.4%
Native American (NH)	–	–	–	–	–	–	–	–	–	–	–	–	0.4%	0.7%	0.6%	0.5%	0.4%	0.4%
Other (NH)	–	–	–	–	–	–	–	–	–	–	–	–	0.6%	1.0%	0.2%	0.2%	0.2%	0.6%
Multiracial (NH)	–	–	–	–	–	–	–	–	–	–	–	–	–	–	–	2.7%	2.6%	4.1%
Total Population	92,597 (Note: This number does not include the Indigenous population at the time. Studies indicate that a further 150,000 Native Americans lived in the territory of California around 1850, with this number declining by over 80% in the following decade.)	379,994	560,247															

=== White Americans ===
==== European Americans ====
California has the largest population of European Americans of any state, with around 15 million people identifying as white alone, and 13 million as non-Hispanic white. Excluding the ~1 million white Californians who identify as Iranian/Persian, Arab, or Armenian, the population of European descent (alone) in the state can be estimated at around 14 million. In 2000, California had more Bulgarian Americans, Romanian Americans and Hungarian Americans than any other US state. Los Angeles and San Francisco have large Russian American and Ukrainian American populations; and a long history of British, Irish, Italian, German, and Polish communities established by immigrants in the late 19th century. There are also many English Americans, Irish Americans, and French Americans whose ancestors were the original 49ers, also known as the California gold rush immigrants.

California has over one million residents each who can trace their ancestry directly to Spain or Portugal, not including over ten million more with indirect Spanish or Portuguese roots from Latin America. Significant Portuguese and Spanish communities can be found along coastal parts of the state such as San Diego, Long Beach, Camarillo, Santa Clara Valley (including Cupertino, Gilroy and San Jose), Salinas Valley, Santa Maria Valley, and San Joaquin Valley. A small wave of Danish Americans, Dutch Americans and Swedish Americans immigrants founded towns like Lathrop near Stockton, Artesia near Los Angeles, Kingsburg south of Fresno, Solvang north of Santa Barbara in the late 1800s and the private community of Sveadal located 15 miles south of San Jose and populated entirely by members of the Swedish American Patriotic League. Small colonies of early 19th-century Russian settlement under the Russian American Company are in Fort Ross, Calistoga and the Russian River Valley in Sonoma and Napa counties. California also has the third largest Greek American population in the United States, behind New York and Massachusetts. The Los Angeles Harbor area of San Pedro has a sizeable Croatian American population. Small Amish/Mennonite colonies exist in an area bordered by the towns Oakdale, Riverbank and Ripon near Modesto and in Reedley, Sanger and Orange Cove near Fresno in the San Joaquin Valley; and in the outer Salinas Valley.

The most important Italian community in California is in North Beach District at San Francisco. 60% of Italian Americans in California are from northern Italy. Others numerous groups are from Tuscany and Sicily. Many Italians also live in San Diego, with Little Italy having San Diego's largest Italian population.

Non-Hispanic Whites in Californian cities declined from 67% in 1970 of the population to 35% in 2000.

There is also a large Dutch community in California. The Dutch settled in Redlands, Ontario, Ripon, and Bellflower.

==== Middle Eastern Americans ====
California has the largest populations of Arab-Americans, Iranian Americans, and Armenian-Americans in the US, with these groups collectively numbering over 1 million in the state.

Little Arabia is an ethnic enclave in Orange County, California, the center for Orange County's Arab Americans, who number more than 24,000 (as of 2000). It is sometimes referred to as "Little Gaza" which was a play on the original designation of this area as the "Garza Island." Little Arabia grew significantly in the 1990s with the arrival of immigrants from the Middle East, and is the home to thousands of Arab Americans predominantly hailing from Egypt, Syria, Palestine, and Yemen.

More than 500,000 Iranian Americans live throughout Southern California, including about 20% of the population of Beverly Hills. Iranian American communities also flourish in the San Fernando Valley, Orange County, San Diego, and the San Joaquin Valley. The majority of Iranian Americans immigrated after the Pahlavi dynasty was overthrown in 1979.

California is also home to many Armenian Americans; the highest concentration of Americans of Armenian descent is in Greater Los Angeles, where 166,498 people have identified themselves as Armenian in the 2000 US census, comprising over 40% of the 385,488 people who identified Armenian origins in the US at the time. Many of these live in Glendale north of Los Angeles, as well as a large community in Fresno. The size of the Armenian American population is disputed, however. According to a 1988 news article, California had about 500,000 ethnic Armenians with over half of them living in Greater Los Angeles.

More than 1,300,000 Jewish Americans live in California, the majority of whom are Ashkenazi Jews. In addition, there are more than 250,000 Israeli Americans live in the Los Angeles area, according to the Israeli American Council. There are also significant Israeli American populations in the Bay Area, San Francisco, and San Jose areas of Northern California. The largest Karaite Jewish population outside of Israel exists in the Bay Area, consisting of several hundreds descendants of refugees from the Egyptian Karaite community, as well as some recent converts. Their community is centered around the only Karaite synagogue outside the Middle East, Congregation B'nai Israel, located in Daly City. The Moroccan Jewish community in California is one of the largest in North America, approximately 10,000 Moroccan Jews reside in Greater Los Angeles, mostly in Pico-Robertson, North Hollywood, and Beverly Hills. Many are the descendants of community members who first emigrated to the United States in the aftermath of World War II. Many others came later in the 20th century from Israel, and beginning in the early 21st century from France due to increasing antisemitism there. The community has their own synagogues as well as a community center.

Over 50,000 Afghan Americans are concentrated in the East Bay primarily in Alameda County and its communities of Fremont and Hayward; Afghans also live throughout the state (esp. Orange and Ventura Counties).

There is also a large population of Assyrian descent living in the Central Valley, with large communities in Modesto, Ceres, and Turlock, as well as throughout the Central Coast and the California Desert (i.e. the Coachella and Imperial Valleys). San Diego has one of the largest concentrations of Chaldean-Assyrian immigrants in the United States.

About an estimated 3,000 Moroccan Americans are living in Los Angeles, Long Beach, and Santa Ana.

Turkish Americans and Azerbaijani Americans form moderately-sized communities in both Los Angeles and San Francisco. The state also has over 2,000 Circassian Americans with a little community in Anaheim.

=== African Americans ===
California has 2.3 million African Americans as of 2010, the largest population of black or African Americans of the Western US states, and the 5th largest black population in the United States.

African Americans are concentrated in Greater Los Angeles, the East Bay of the San Francisco Bay Area, and Sacramento region.

Most African Americans in California have origins from Southern states like Louisiana, Texas, Arkansas, and Oklahoma.

California has a number of West Indian (Afro-Caribbean American) and African immigrants from countries such as Cape Verde, Eritrea, Ethiopia, Ghana, Kenya, Nigeria, Senegal, Somalia, South Africa, Tanzania, and Yemen across from the Horn of Africa. Immigrants from these countries have established communities in a number of cities in the state, such as Little Ethiopia in West Los Angeles. In addition to the Ethiopian community in Los Angeles, there is a significant Ethiopian population in Oakland/Berkeley. Nuer refugees from South Sudan have migrated to the Sacramento area. There are Cape Verdean communities in Solano County, the Santa Clara Valley, and the San Diego area. As of 2019, there are 13,061 Jamaicans in the state.

=== Native Americans ===
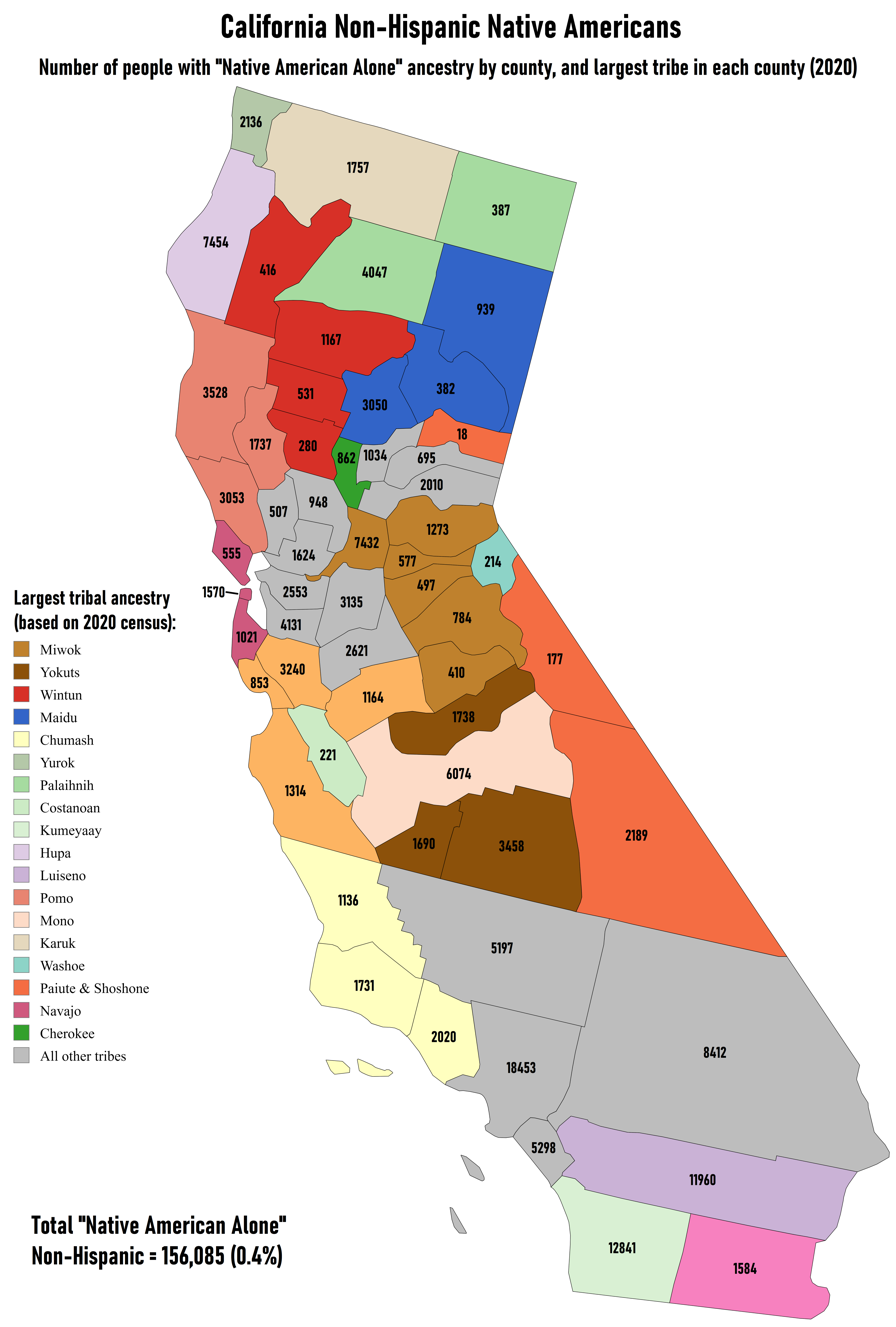
Largest Non-Hispanic Native American ancestry by county and numbers of people reporting "Native American Alone"

As of 2010, California's Native American population of 362,801 was the most of any state. It also has the most Native American tribes, indigenous to the state or not. Many Californian Indian tribes became extinct in the late 19th century, while most of them have been strongly reduced in population, but there are currently 109 federally recognized tribes indigenous to California, more than any other state. Census figures from 2010 place the population of Indigenous Californian tribes collectively at around ~100,000, significantly less than their estimated population of over 300,000 prior to colonization. The US census also includes Latin American Indians, especially immigrants who belonged to Indigenous ethnic groups from Mexico, Central America, and South America, as Native Americans. This group makes up the majority of Native Americans in California as of 2023, with over 80% of the state’s 546,942 Native Americans identifying as Hispanic.

The Cherokee Nation is the largest tribe in the state with a population of 28,000 in 2025, although the number of self identified Cherokee descendants was at 110,000 in the 2010 census, and any persons residing in California with any degree of Cherokee descent is estimated at up to 300,000. Their tribal nation is located in the northeast part of Oklahoma, but they live across the state and neighboring states. Cherokees in California are often descendants of Dust Bowl refugees in the 1930s and 1940s, who migrated from Oklahoma to the state's farming counties and urban areas for jobs. The largest urban American Indian communities are found in Los Angeles/Long Beach, San Francisco/Oakland, Sacramento, and San Diego areas.

California also has significant populations of the Apache, Chickasaw, Choctaw, Muscogee, Seminole, Tlingit, Hopi, Zuni, Navajo, Blackfeet, Shoshone, Nez Perce, Paiute, Pueblo, and Tohono Oʼodham, in addition to Indigenous Californian tribes such as the Cahuilla, Chumash, Karuk, Yurok, and Yokuts tribes. The Cahuilla in the Coachella Valley have profited from real estate land leases, and much of Indio and Palm Springs are tribal-owned lands under legal tribal jurisdiction.

=== Asian Americans ===
California has the largest Asian population in the United States, with Asian Americans numbering 7,176,032 in the state, making up 18.4% of the total population. The state has a long history of established East, South, and Southeast Asian American communities, including Chinese since the 1850s, Japanese since the 1880s, Indians since the 1890s, and Filipinos for over a century since 1900. A large wave of Asian immigration since 1965, following the Immigration and Nationality Act of 1965 which ended the ban on Asian immigration, brought in more Chinese and Filipinos, along with many Koreans and Southeast Asians after the Vietnam War ended in the late 1970s. South Asians are currently the fastest-growing group of Asians in the state.

As of the 2010 census there were a total of 17,941,286 respondents in the United States who claimed to be Asian American and Asian. Out of these respondents in the United States, 30.9% lived in California, with 5,556,592 Asian Americans being counted by the 2010 census. This is a 1.5 million growth in population from the 2000 census, making Asian Americans 14.9 percent of the state's population in 2010. Out of those almost 5.6 million Asian Americans in California there were 1,474,707 Filipinos, 1,349,111 Chinese, 647,589 Vietnamese, 590,445 Indians, 505,225 Koreans, 428,140 Japanese, 109,928 Taiwanese, 102,317 Cambodians, 91,224 Hmong, 69,303 Laotians, 67,707 Thais, 53,474 Pakistanis, 39,506 Borneans, Sumatrans, and Indonesians, 17,978 Burmese, 11,929 Sri Lankans, 10,494 Bangladeshis, 6,231 Nepalese, 5,595 Malaysians, 4,993 Mongolians, 1,513 Singaporeans, 1,377 Ryukyuans, and 750 Bhutanese.

==== East Asian Americans ====
Chinese Americans are numerous in San Francisco, Oakland, the East Bay, South Bay, the Central Coast of California, Sacramento, San Diego, and the San Gabriel Valley region of Los Angeles County. The San Francisco Bay Area has a greater concentration of Cantonese-speaking Chinese than any other region in the United States. The Mexican border community of Calexico, California in addition to Mexicali has large numbers of Chinese Mexican Americans, that is, Mexican Americans of Chinese ancestry. Smaller Chinese communities can also be found in San Jacinto Valley, Lake Elsinore, and Victorville.

Southern California has perhaps the largest Taiwan-born Chinese American community in the US, particularly in the San Gabriel Valley (i.e. Walnut and Diamond Bar), Buena Park, Cerritos, West Covina, Irvine, communities in the South Bay, Los Angeles and southern Orange County. Many minority groups from China also live in California, for example, there are Tibetan and Mongolian Americans concentrated in San Francisco, Oakland, San Jose, Orange County, and the Los Angeles/Long Beach area.

Large Korean American communities exist in the Koreatown area of Los Angeles, the eastern San Gabriel Valley, the San Fernando Valley, Cerritos/Long Beach, South Bay, Los Angeles, northern Orange County and San Diego area. There is another large Korean American population in the San Francisco Bay Area, and Koreans are growing in number in the suburban Inland Empire region, in cities such as Chino Hills, Corona, Desert Hot Springs, and Loma Linda south of San Bernardino. Since 1990, the Korean American and African American populations relocated westward and northward in the Los Angeles area.

The South Bay area and Little Tokyo have a large Japanese American community. Japanese Americans, however, are also concentrated in San Francisco and across the Bay Area, San Jose, the Salinas Valley and Santa Cruz County; and smaller communities in the Sacramento, Fresno, Bakersfield, Anaheim, San Diego, San Bernardino, Santa Barbara, and Stockton areas. Despite the presence of Japanese goods stores, media outlets and restaurants in the state, most "Little Tokyos" and "Japantowns" were evacuated during the forced relocation of Japanese Americans during World War II (see Japanese American Internment). As a result, most Japanese Americans in urban areas do not reside in historical Japanese communities.

==== South Asian Americans ====
California has the largest Indian American population in the US. Many live in the Los Angeles Metropolitan Area, San Diego, and the San Francisco Bay Area. The Los Angeles suburbs of Artesia and Cerritos have large Indian American communities. San Jose, Fremont, and other Silicon Valley cities have many Indian Americans who are employed in the high-tech industry. Many Indian Americans are in Central Valley cities such as Stockton, Bakersfield, Fresno, Yuba City and Livingston, and the Imperial Valley. Most South Asians in California are Indian American, but there are also Pakistani Americans, Bangladeshi Americans, and Sri Lankan Americans (see Sinhalese and Tamils) especially concentrated in the San Gabriel Valley (Covina Valley) of the Los Angeles area. California is home to the unique Punjabi Mexican American community, mostly centered around Yuba City.

==== Southeast Asian Americans ====
California has the largest American population of Southeast Asians, concentrated in the Los Angeles-Long Beach, Sacramento, and Fresno areas. This includes the Hmong and Vietnamese, including Chinese Vietnamese. Long Beach has one of the largest Cambodian American communities in the United States. The neighboring cities of Westminster and Garden Grove have the largest Vietnamese American community outside of Vietnam and are often dubbed "Little Saigon". Vietnamese and Cambodian immigrants also settled in the San Francisco Bay Area, especially San Jose, Santa Clara and Sunnyvale, as well across the San Joaquin Valley and in San Diego.

Filipino Americans are particularly numerous in Los Angeles, Sacramento, San Francisco, San Diego, San Mateo, and Solano counties, and in southern California communities such as Artesia, Baldwin Park, Carson, Cerritos, Covina, West Covina, and the Eagle Rock district of Los Angeles. Around San Diego, many Filipinos live in the communities of Mira Mesa, National City, and Chula Vista. Delano near Bakersfield, other towns in the San Joaquin Valley, the Inland Empire of Riverside-San Bernardino, Coachella Valley-Imperial Valley region, Salinas, Stockton and Lathrop, and the Santa Maria/San Luis Obispo area also have large Filipino American populations. Daly City south of San Francisco has a large Filipino population and is the largest percentage wise in the United States. As of the 1980s, Filipinos have been the largest population of Asians in California. Twenty percent of registered nurses, in 2013, in California are Filipino.

Over 6,000 Laotian Americans live in the Fresno area, including an even larger Hmong American community, the second-largest of its kind. Other Hmong colonies in the Central Valley of California and Northern California developed since the end of the Vietnam War (1975–1979).

California also has a Thai American community of over 250,000, concentrated in Southern California, with small Thai and Southeast Asian communities in Perris and Banning in the Inland Empire region. Los Angeles has the largest Thai population outside of Thailand and is also home to the world's first Thai Town. About 150,000 Indonesians live in Southern California, primarily the Los Angeles and San Diego areas.

=== Pacific Islander Americans ===
The state has 150,000 residents with Pacific Islander ancestry. Most of them are 80,000 Native Hawaiians of measurable Polynesian ancestry; many also have Asian, European, or other ancestries. There are also 25,000 Samoan Americans originally from American Samoa or Western Samoa. Most live in Long Beach and the Los Angeles suburbs of Carson, Artesia, Cerritos, and Redondo Beach, Oceanside, and Upland. About 10,000 Chamorros from Guam and the Northern Mariana Islands live in Northern California, the largest Micronesian community in the mainland United States. An estimated 10,000 Tahitians from French Polynesia live in Southern California.

There are also many Palauan Americans in southern California, specifically in the San Diego area. This includes Vista which has a population of 677 Palauan Americans according to the 2010 US census. Members of the Palauan community often also have Malay, Indonesian, Micronesian, Melanesian, Japanese, and other East Asian ancestries. Many Chuukese or Trukese live in San Diego.

=== Americans of some other race ===
==== Hispanic and Latino Californians ====
Latinos, mainly Mexican Americans, form the largest collective ethnic group in California, at 15,760,437 or 40.4% of the total population. They make up major portions of the population of Southern California, especially in Los Angeles, as well as the San Joaquin Valley. The city of Los Angeles is often said to have the largest Mexican community in the United States. Census records kept track of the growth since 1850, but Mexicans and Mexican Americans have lived in California since Spanish colonial times. However, the number and percentage population of Latinos living in California increased rapidly in the late 20th century, from only 9% in 1960 to over 40% in 2023, making up the largest non-White minority group in the state.

The Imperial Valley on the US-Mexican border is about 70–75% Latino; communities with many Latinos can also be found in Riverside County, especially at its eastern end, and the Coachella Valley. The Central Valley has many Mexican American migrant farm workers. Latinos are the majority in 11 counties: Colusa, Fresno, Imperial, Kern, Kings, Madera, Merced, Monterey, San Benito, San Bernardino, and Tulare counties.

Latinos make up over 20% of the San Francisco Bay Area. Many live in San Mateo, Redwood City, Alameda, Contra Costa, and Santa Clara counties, as well in San Francisco. The Napa and Salinas Valleys have predominantly Latino communities established by migrant farm workers. San Jose is about 30–35% Latino, the largest Latino community in northern California, while the Mission District, San Francisco and Lower/West Oakland have barrios established by Mexican and Latin American immigrants. The Mexican American communities of East Los Angeles and Logan Heights, San Diego, as well the San Joaquin Valley are centers of historic Chicano and Latino cultures.

California has the largest populations of Hispanics/Latinos in the country. Most of the state's Latinos have Mexican ancestry, having the largest Mexican population in the United States, making up about 31 percent of the state population. Despite the Hispanic population being mostly Mexican, California has a large and diverse population of other Hispanic groups, having the largest Central American, especially Salvadoran population in the United States. Guatemalan Americans are spread out in Southern California after previously being centered in Los Angeles between 1970 and 2010. California also has many Cuban Americans, Puerto Rican Americans, Honduran Americans, and Nicaraguan Americans, along with people of Chilean, Colombian, Peruvian, and other South American ancestry. Los Angeles has had the United States' largest Central American community, as well as the largest Mexican American community, since the 1910s. In fact, the 1900 census record finds 319 to 619 out of 100,000 residents in the city of Los Angeles were "Spanish" or "Mexican". Nearly 31% of Los Angeles itself is of Mexican descent, having the largest Mexican population of any city in the United States. 12,392 Belizeans also live in California.

In Mariposa County, there is a very small community of Californios or Spanish American people as they identify themselves, that dates back before the US annexation of California. Hornitos is home to an estimated 1,000 people and many have Spanish heritage. The community's "Spanish" Californio culture is closely linked with Mexico and other Latin American nations.

== Ancestries of Californians ==
Ancestry	Number in 2023 (Alone)	Number as of 2023 (Alone or in any combination)	% Total
Mexican	—	12,651,958	32.5%
Black or African American (Including Afro-Caribbean and sub-Saharan African)	2,103,789	2,813,880	7.2%
German	620,921	2,535,439	6.5%
English	686,470	2,332,372	6.0%
Irish	536,672	2,176,582	5.6%
Chinese (Not including Taiwanese)	1,535,224	1,881,140	4.8%
Filipino	1,301,440	1,717,654	4.4%
Italian	407,677	1,268,906	3.3%
American (Mostly old-stock white Americans of British descent)	730,918	1,104,076	2.8%
Indian	924,630	998,170	2.5%
Vietnamese	688,048	835,275	2.1%
Salvadoran	—	779,779	2.0%
Broadly "European" (No country specified)	402,709	569,123	1.5%
Korean	472,787	564,443	1.4%
Guatemalan	—	541,911	1.4%
French (Not including French Canadian)	88,705	492,485	1.3%
Japanese	238,913	465,117	1.2%
Scottish	108,335	449,373	1.2%
Polish	119,719	419,229	1.1%
Other Hispanic (Including Californios)	—	348,958	0.9%
Arab	224,577	333,777	0.9%
Spanish (Including responses of "Spaniard," "Spanish," and "Spanish American")	—	315,273	0.9%
Broadly "Native American" (No tribe specified)	88,760	304,532	0.8%
Portuguese	123,591	304,272	0.8%
Norwegian	85,291	303,728	0.8%
Swedish	68,643	301,010	0.8%
Russian	119,263	299,388	0.8%
Dutch	71,250	254,031	0.7%
'Aztec'	159,126	249,237	0.6%
Armenian	187,846	246,558	0.6%
Iranian/Persian	178,247	221,462	0.6%
Scotch-Irish	47,722	167,074	0.4%
Ukrainian	79,919	148,151	0.4%
Nicaraguan	—	144,174	0.4%
Colombian	—	141,735	0.4%
Broadly “British” (Not further specified)	53,603	141,004	0.4%
Taiwanese	116,422	140,727	0.4%
Danish	31,079	134,210	0.3%
Welsh	20,001	126,530	0.3%
Honduran	—	123,483	0.3%
Cambodian	92,355	123,266	0.3%
Peruvian	—	122,803	0.3%
Broadly "African" (Not further specified)	81,259	120,268	0.3%
Greek	47,388	117,668	0.3%
Maya	69,829	115,830	0.3%
Broadly "Asian" (Not further specified)	41,563	113,784	0.3%
Hmong	106,958	113,383	0.3%
Broadly "Eastern European" (Not further specified)	65,348	111,130	0.3%
Pakistani	82,851	96,172	0.2%
Hungarian	28,442	95,723	0.2%
Broadly "Scandinavian" (Not further specified)	35,505	88,812	0.2%
Afghan	77,005	86,859	0.2%
Native Hawaiian	19,432	86,710	0.2%
Thai	54,688	83,726	0.2%
Swiss	16,590	81,133	0.2%
French Canadian	25,594	68,468	0.2%
Samoan	37,349	68,080	0.2%
Canadian	29,516	64,088	0.2%
Czech	16,234	63,910	0.2%
Nigerian	42,947	62,685	0.2%
Laotian	42,469	60,496	0.2%
Austrian	13,933	58,131	0.1%
Broadly "Northern European" (Not further specified)	38,823	56,433	0.1%
Romanian	29,946	56,147	0.1%
Brazilian	31,662	51,662	0.1%
Indonesian	23,860	47,864	0.1%
Lithuanian	12,057	46,075	0.1%
Finnish	10,420	44,353	0.1%
Croatian	13,963	40,404	0.1%
Chamorro (2,475 additionally reported their ancestry as "Guamanian" alone, and 6,328 reported "Guamanian" alone or in combination)	17,337	37,787	0.1%
Fijian	25,284	37,550	0.1%
Jamaican	19,009	37,149	0.1%
Turkish	22,782	34,351	0.09%
Navajo	13,385	32,663	0.08%
Ethiopian	25,507	30,288	0.08%
Israeli	18,681	30,242	0.08%
Blackfeet	2,785	28,099	0.07%
'Yugoslavian' (Not further specified)	13,109	25,540	0.07%
Belgian	6,602	22,758	0.06%
Slovak	7,430	22,565	0.06%
Belizean	12,782	22,488	0.06%
Assyrian	14,961	22,088	0.06%

== Country of birth ==
California has historically held a large foreign born population. In 1970, 8.6% were foreign born with 3.4% being new arrivals (in the last ten years), 1.9% being between 10 to 20 years and 3.2% being resident for over 20. By 1990, 21.8% were foreign born with 11.1% being new arrivals and 4.8% being resident for over 20 years.

American Community Survey (ACS) data from 2021
Rank	Country of birth	Population
1.	United States	28,786,026
2.	Mexico	3,859,785
3.	Philippines	812,752
4.	China	766,855
5.	India	547,009
6.	Vietnam	503,340
7.	El Salvador	460,260
8.	South Korea	311,049
9.	Iran	212,452
10.	Taiwan	171,960
11.	United Kingdom	121,581
12.	Canada	120,102
13.	Japan	106,870
14.	Russia	73,582
15.	Germany	72,672

== Vital statistics ==
Vital statistics since 1909
Year	Average population	Live births	Deaths	Natural change	Crude birth rate (per 1,000)	Crude death rate (per 1,000)	Natural change (per 1,000)
1909	2,282,000				13.6	13.6	0.0
1910	2,406,000				13.3	13.3	0.0
1911	2,534,000				13.8	13.4	0.4
1912	2,668,000				14.6	13.9	0.7
1913	2,811,000				15.7	13.9	1.8
1914	2,934,000				15.7	12.6	3.1
1915	3,008,000				16.0	13.0	3.0
1916	3,071,000				16.6	13.0	3.6
1917	3,171,000				16.4	13.2	3.2
1918	3,262,000				17.2	17.6	-0.6
1919	3,339,000				17.1	13.8	3.3
1920	3,554,000				18.9	13.2	5.7
1921	3,795,000				19.0	12.4	6.6
1922	3,991,000				18.3	13.0	5.3
1923	4,270,000				18.7	12.6	6.1
1924	4,541,000				19.2	12.6	6.6
1925	4,730,000				18.0	12.1	5.9
1926	4,929,000				16.6	12.0	4.9
1927	5,147,000				16.3	11.9	4.4
1928	5,344,000				15.7	12.4	3.3
1929	5,531,000				14.6	11.8	2.8
1930	5,711,000				14.7	11.6	3.1
1931	5,824,000				14.1	11.7	2.4
1932	5,894,000				13.2	11.5	1.7
1933	5,963,000				12.6	11.4	1.2
1934	6,060,000				12.9	11.2	1.7
1935	6,175,000				13.0	11.8	1.2
1936	6,341,000	84,502	76,094	8,408	13.3	12.0	1.3
1937	6,528,000	94,230	80,256	13,974	14.4	12.3	2.1
1938	6,656,000	101,844	76,187	25,657	15.3	11.4	3.9
1939	6,785,000	103,453	77,130	26,323	15.2	11.4	3.9
1940	6,950,000	112,011	80,270	31,741	16.1	11.5	4.6
1941	7,237,000	124,682	81,421	43,261	17.2	11.3	6.0
1942	7,735,000	153,632	85,045	68,587	19.9	11.0	8.9
1943	8,506,000	172,475	89,492	82,983	20.3	10.5	9.8
1944	8,945,000	177,213	91,428	85,785	19.8	10.2	9.6
1945	9,344,000	183,127	93,157	89,970	19.6	10.0	9.6
1946	9,559,000	217,902	95,035	122,867	22.8	9.9	12.9
1947	9,832,000	245,482	96,977	148,505	25.0	9.9	15.1
1948	10,060,000	240,777	98,905	141,872	23.9	9.8	14.1
1949	10,340,000	245,199	100,361	144,838	23.7	9.7	14.0
1950	10,680,000	243,757	98,672	145,085	22.8	9.2	13.6
1951	11,130,000	259,508	103,808	155,700	23.3	9.3	14.0
1952	11,640,000	280,426	108,645	171,781	24.1	9.3	14.8
1953	12,250,000	296,634	110,005	186,629	24.2	9.0	15.2
1954	12,750,000	305,224	109,332	195,892	23.9	8.6	15.4
1955	13,130,000	315,901	114,463	201,438	24.1	8.7	15.3
1956	13,710,000	336,351	119,851	216,500	24.5	8.7	15.8
1957	14,260,000	353,549	124,078	229,471	24.8	8.7	16.1
1958	14,880,000	352,195	125,842	226,353	23.7	8.5	15.2
1959	15,470,000	358,386	128,441	229,945	23.2	8.3	14.9
1960	15,870,000	371,476	135,508	235,968	23.4	8.5	14.9
1961	16,500,000	380,856	137,327	243,529	23.1	8.3	14.8
1962	17,070,000	378,052	141,172	236,880	22.1	8.3	13.9
1963	17,670,000	380,410	147,866	232,544	21.5	8.4	13.2
1964	18,150,000	374,972	150,793	224,179	20.7	8.3	12.4
1965	18,580,000	355,592	152,907	202,685	19.1	8.2	10.9
1966	18,860,000	337,734	157,444	180,290	17.9	8.3	9.6
1967	19,180,000	336,720	156,881	179,839	17.6	8.2	9.4
1968	19,390,000	339,760	160,806	178,954	17.5	8.3	9.2
1969	19,710,000	353,526	166,077	187,449	17.9	8.4	9.5
1970	19,970,000	362,756	166,339	196,417	18.2	8.3	9.8
1971	20,350,000	329,954	169,322	160,632	16.2	8.3	7.9
1972	20,590,000	306,470	169,984	136,486	14.9	8.3	6.6
1973	20,870,000	298,086	172,710	125,376	14.3	8.3	6.0
1974	21,170,000	311,820	170,403	141,417	14.7	8.0	6.7
1975	21,540,000	317,423	170,687	146,736	14.7	7.9	6.8
1976	21,940,000	332,256	171,022	161,234	15.1	7.8	7.3
1977	22,350,000	347,817	170,399	177,418	15.6	7.6	8.0
1978	22,840,000	356,310	176,069	180,241	15.6	7.7	7.9
1979	23,260,000	379,244	177,399	201,845	16.3	7.6	8.7
1980	23,670,000	402,949	186,624	216,325	17.0	7.9	9.1
1981	24,290,000	420,726	184,987	235,739	17.3	7.6	9.7
1982	24,820,000	429,897	188,471	241,426	17.3	7.6	9.7
1983	25,360,000	436,096	188,442	247,654	17.2	7.4	9.8
1984	25,840,000	447,586	195,531	252,055	17.3	7.6	9.8
1985	26,440,000	470,951	201,911	269,040	17.8	7.6	10.2
1986	27,100,000	482,236	203,293	278,943	17.8	7.5	10.3
1987	27,780,000	503,413	209,424	293,989	18.1	7.5	10.6
1988	28,460,000	533,148	215,485	317,663	18.7	7.6	11.2
1989	29,220,000	569,992	216,619	353,373	19.5	7.4	12.1
1990	29,960,000	612,628	214,369	398,259	20.4	7.2	13.3
1991	30,470,000	610,077	215,284	394,793	20.0	7.1	12.9
1992	30,970,000	601,730	215,847	385,883	19.4	7.0	12.5
1993	31,270,000	585,324	221,989	363,335	18.7	7.1	11.6
1994	31,480,000	567,930	224,292	343,638	18.0	7.1	10.9
1995	31,700,000	552,045	224,213	327,832	17.4	7.1	10.3
1996	32,020,000	539,789	223,447	316,342	16.8	7.0	9.9
1997	32,830,000	524,840	224,592	300,248	16.0	6.8	9.1
1998	32,990,000	521,661	226,954	294,707	15.9	6.9	9.0
1999	33,500,000	518,508	229,380	289,128	15.5	6.8	8.7
2000	33,990,000	531,959	229,551	302,408	15.5	6.7	8.8
2001	34,480,000	527,759	234,044	293,715	15.3	6.7	8.6
2002	34,870,000	529,357	234,565	294,792	15.1	6.7	8.4
2003	35,250,000	540,997	239,371	301,626	15.2	6.6	8.6
2004	35,570,000	544,843	232,525	312,318	15.1	6.7	8.4
2005	35,830,000	548,882	237,037	311,845	15.2	6.4	8.8
2006	36,020,000	562,440	237,126	325,314	15.3	6.6	8.7
2007	36,250,000	566,414	233,720	332,694	15.4	6.4	9.0
2008	36,600,000	551,779	234,766	317,013	15.4	6.4	9.0
2009	36,960,000	527,020	232,736	294,284	14.5	6.1	8.4
2010	37,350,000	510,198	234,012	276,186	13.8	6.2	7.6
2011	37,670,000	502,120	239,942	262,178	13.5	6.3	7.2
2012	38,020,000	503,755	242,554	261,201	13.1	6.3	6.8
2013	38,350,000	494,705	248,359	246,346	13.0	6.5	6.5
2014	38,700,000	502,879	245,929	256,950	12.9	6.3	6.6
2015	38,914,000	491,748	259,206	232,542	12.8	6.5	6.3
2016	39,128,000	488,827	262,240	226,587	12.5	6.6	5.9
2017	39,329,000	471,658	268,189	203,469	12.3	6.8	5.5
2018	39,476,000	454,920	268,818	186,102	11.7	6.9	4.8
2019	39,530,000	446,479	269,831	176,648	11.4	6.8	4.6
2020	39,542,000	420,259	319,808	100,451	11.1	7.1	4.0
2021	39,260,000	420,608	333,249	87,359	10.5	8.8	1.7
2022	39,220,000	419,104	313,161	105,943	10.8	8.1	2.7
2023	39,280,000	400,108	294,735	105,373	10.4	7.7	2.7
2024	39,510,000	402,075	288,143	113,932	10.1	7.3	2.8
2025	39,529,000	393,222	285,900	107,322	10.1	7.4	2.7
Year	Average population	Live births	Deaths	Natural change	Crude birth rate (per 1,000)	Crude death rate (per 1,000)	Natural change (per 1,000)

Live Births by Single Race/Ethnicity of Mother
Ethnicity	2014	2015	2016	2017	2018	2019	2020	2021	2022	2023	2024
White	144,318 (28.7%)	141,592 (28.8%)	132,780 (27.2%)	127,822 (27.1%)	123,139 (27.1%)	121,076 (27.1%)	115,543 (27.5%)	115,845 (27.5%)	110,370 (26.3%)	104,381 (26.1%)	102,406 (25.5%)
Asian	84,224 (16.7%)	80,269 (16.3%)	73,843 (15.1%)	72,049 (15.2%)	68,444 (15.0%)	67,754 (15.2%)	58,543 (13.9%)	55,777 (13.3%)	56,915 (13.6%)	55,780 (13.9%)	58,695 (14.6%)
Black	31,654 (6.3%)	30,546 (6.2%)	23,936 (4.9%)	23,441 (5.0%)	22,380 (4.9%)	22,374 (5.0%)	21,350 (5.1%)	21,287 (5.1%)	20,050 (4.8%)	18,340 (4.6%)	17,722 (4.4%)
Pacific Islander	...	...	1,851 (0.4%)	1,809 (0.4%)	1,732 (0.4%)	1,711 (0.4%)	1,617 (0.4%)	1,619 (0.4%)	1,601 (0.4%)	1,453 (0.4%)	1,416 (0.3%)
American Indian	3,509 (0.7%)	3,510 (0.7%)	1,447 (0.3%)	1,411 (0.3%)	1,411 (0.3%)	1,458 (0.3%)	1,391 (0.3%)	1,316 (0.3%)	1,297 (0.3%)	1,169 (0.3%)	1,185 (0.3%)
Hispanic (any race)	237,539 (47.2%)	234,237 (47.6%)	228,982 (46.8%)	220,122 (46.7%)	211,271 (46.4%)	203,996 (45.7%)	194,295 (46.2%)	196,077 (46.6%)	203,312 (48.5%)	194,939 (48.7%)	196,312 (48.8%)
Total	502,879 (100%)	491,748 (100%)	488,827 (100%)	471,658 (100%)	454,920 (100%)	446,479 (100%)	420,259 (100%)	420,608 (100%)	419,104 (100%)	400,108 (100%)	402,075 (100%)

Note: Births in table do not add up, because Hispanics are counted both by their ethnicity and by their race, giving a higher overall number.

- Persons of Hispanic origin may be of any race.

=== Percentage surviving ===
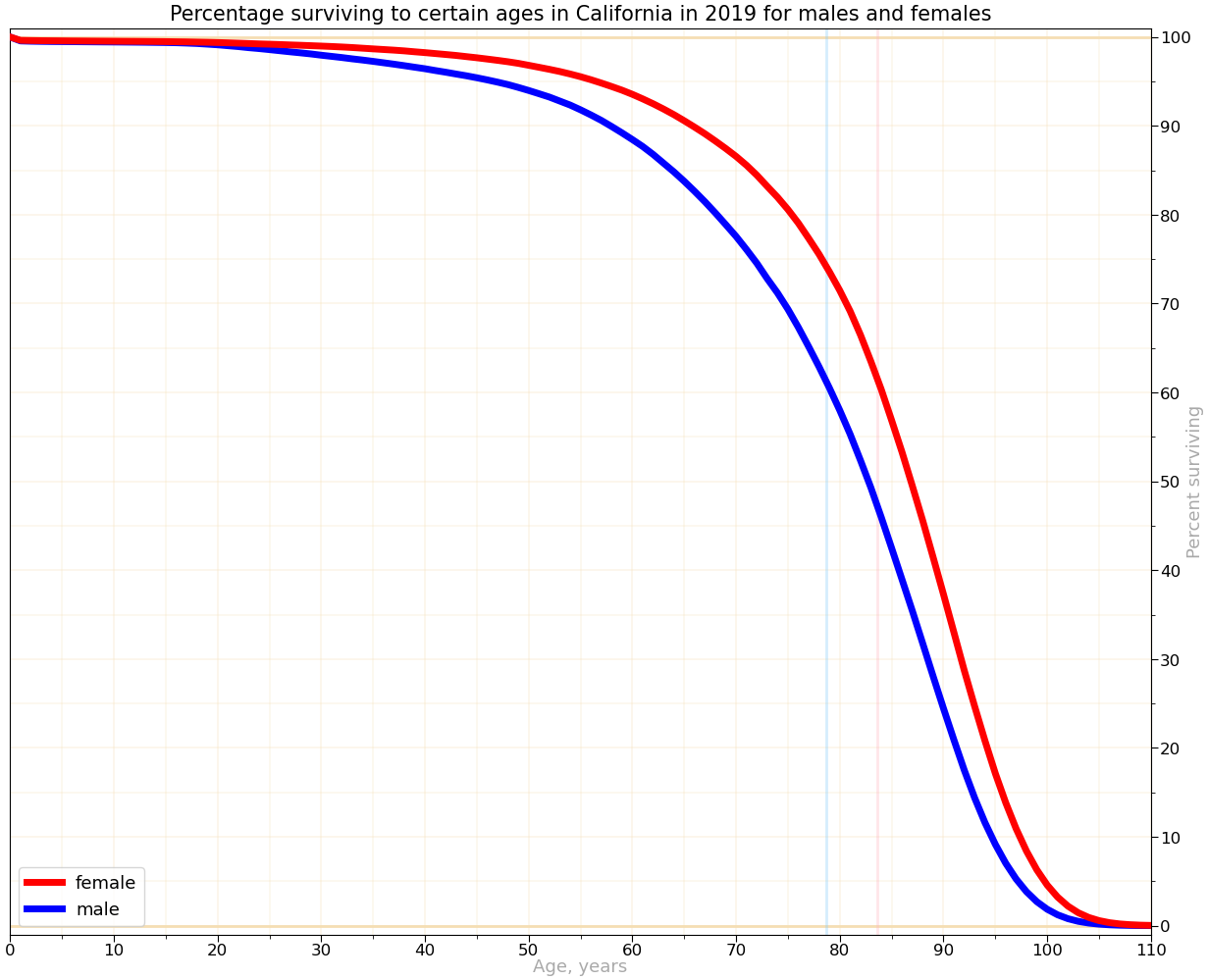
Percentage surviving to certain ages in California in 2019. Life expectancy in this state is one of the highest in the US: before COVID-19 it was 81.15 years.

The percentage surviving, is the percent of the population that would survive to certain age, if their life conditions in a given year, were extrapolated to their whole life. Data for 2019.

Age	Percentage surviving		F / M
Age	male	female	F / M
1	99.6	99.6	1.00
5	99.5	99.6	1.00
10	99.4	99.5	1.00
15	99.4	99.5	1.00
20	99.1	99.4	1.00
25	98.6	99.2	1.01
30	98.0	99.0	1.01
35	97.3	98.7	1.01
40	96.4	98.2	1.02
45	95.4	97.7	1.02
50	94.0	96.8	1.03
55	91.8	95.5	1.04
60	88.5	93.6	1.06
65	83.8	90.6	1.08
70	77.6	86.6	1.12
75	69.4	80.6	1.16
80	58.0	71.5	1.23
85	42.5	56.9	1.34
90	24.4	37.3	1.53
95	9.1	17.1	1.87
100	1.848	4.569	2.47
105	0.168	0.570	3.39
110	0.006	0.029	4.83

Data source: US Mortality DataBase.

== Languages ==
Top 12 Non-English Languages spoken in California (as of 2010)
Language	Percentage of population
Spanish	28.46%
Chinese (including Cantonese and Mandarin)	2.80%
Tagalog	2.20%
Vietnamese	1.43%
Korean	1.08%
Armenian and Persian (tied)	0.52% (each)
Japanese	0.43%
Russian	0.42%
Hindi and Arabic (tied)	0.38% (each)
French	0.36%

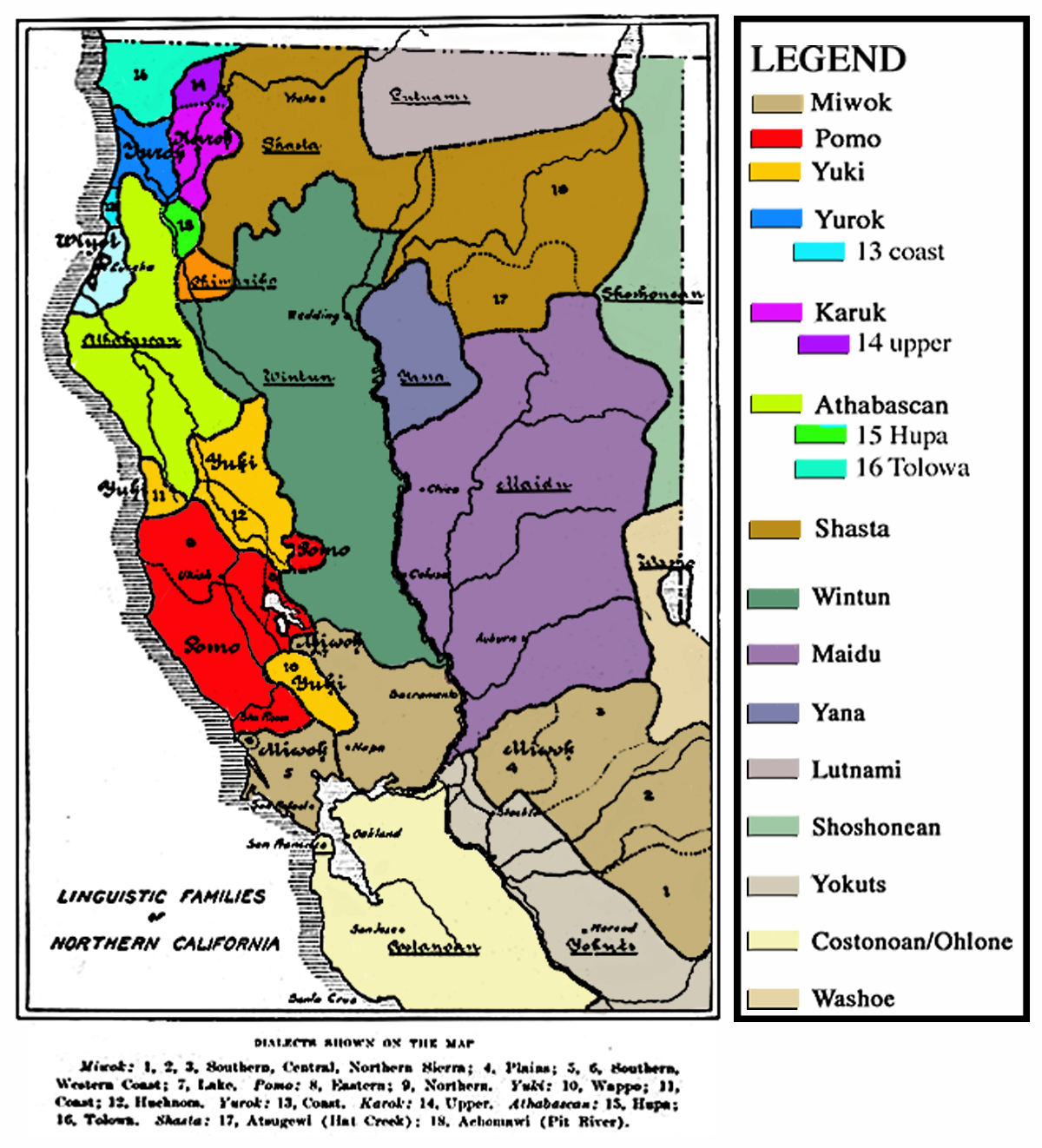
Indigenous languages of northern California

As of 2010, 20,379,282 of California residents age 5 and older spoke English at home as a primary language, while 10,672,610 spoke Spanish, 1,231,425 Chinese (which includes Cantonese and Mandarin), 796,451 Tagalog, 559,932 Vietnamese, 367,523 Korean, 192,980 Armenian, and Persian was spoken as a main language by 203,770 of the population over the age of five. In total, 14,644,136 of California's population age 5 and older spoke a mother language other than English.

Comparatively, according to the 2007 American Community Survey, 42.6 percent of California's population older than five spoke a language other than English at home, with 73 percent of those also speaking English well or very well, while 9.8 did not speak English at all.

California had the highest concentration of Vietnamese or Chinese speakers in the United States, second highest concentration of Korean or Spanish speakers in the United States, and third highest concentration of Tagalog speakers in the United States. Over 200 languages are known to be spoken and read in California, with Spanish used as the state's "alternative" language.

California was historically one of the most linguistically diverse areas in the world, and is home to more than 70 indigenous languages derived from 64 root languages in 6 language families. All of California's indigenous languages are endangered as a direct result of the California genocide and generations of forced linguistic assimilation at American Indian boarding schools, although there are now tribal-led efforts toward language revitalization, mostly among nations with means to sustain formal language programs. A survey conducted between 2007 and 2009 identified 23 different indigenous languages of Mexico that are spoken among California farmworkers.

The following indigenous languages are or were spoken in California:

- Algic Family:
  - Wiyot †
  - Yurok †
- Na-Dene Family:
  - Cahto †
  - Hupa †
  - Mattole †
  - Tolowa †
  - Wailaki †
- ? Hokan Family:
  - Chimariko †
  - Esselen †
  - Karuk
  - Salinan†
  - Chumashan †
    - Obispeño †
    - Island Chumash †
    - Purisimeño †
    - Ineseño †
    - Barbareño †
    - Ventureño †
  - Pomoan
    - Kashaya
    - Central Pomo †
    - Southern Pomo †
    - Northern Pomo †
    - Northeastern Pomo †
    - Eastern Pomo †
    - Southeastern Pomo
  - Shastan †
    - Konomihu †
    - New River Shasta †
    - Okwanuchu †
    - Shasta †
  - Yuman–Cochimí
    - Ipai
    - Tipai
    - Mohave
    - Yuma
    - Cocopah
    - Halchidhoma †
- ? Penutian Family:
  - Plateauan
    - Modoc †
  - Maiduan †
    - Konkow †
    - Maidu †
    - Nisenan †
  - Utian
    - Miwok (includes Coast Miwok and Lake Miwok)
    - Ohlone †
  - Wintuan †
    - Nomlaki †
    - Patwin †
    - Wintu †
  - Yokuts (includes Northern Valley, Southern Valley and Foothill Yokuts)
- Uto-Aztecan Family:
  - Cahuilla †
  - Chemehuevi
  - Cupeño †
  - Kawaiisu
  - Kitanemuk †
  - Luiseño-Juaneño †
  - Monache and Owens Valley Paiute
  - Panamint Shoshone
  - Serrano †
  - Tataviam †
  - Tongva-Gabrielino †
  - Tübatulabal †
- Yukian Family:
  - Yuki †
  - Wappo †

The official language of California has been English since the passage of Proposition 63 in 1986. However, many state, city, and local government agencies still continue to print official public documents in numerous languages. For example, the California Department of Motor Vehicles offers the written exam for the standard C Class driver's license in 31 languages along with English, and the audio exam in 11 languages. The politics of language is a major political issue in the state, especially in regard to language policy controlling the teaching and official use of immigrant languages.

As a result of the state's increasing diversity and migration from other areas across the country and around the globe, linguists began noticing a noteworthy set of emerging characteristics of spoken English in California since the late 20th century. This dialect, known as California English, has a vowel shift and several other phonological processes that are different from the dialects used in other regions of the country.

== Religion ==
Religion in California (2023-2024)
1. Protestantism (26.0%)
2. Catholicism (25.0%)
3. Mormonism (1.00%)
4. Eastern Orthodoxy (1.00%)
5. Jehovah's Witness (1.00%)
6. Other Christian (1.00%)
7. No religion (33.0%)
8. Judaism (2.00%)
9. Hinduism (2.00%)
10. Buddhism (2.00%)
11. Islam (1.00%)
12. Other (2.00%)

California has the most Catholics in the United States, ahead of New York State, as well as large Protestant, non-religious, Jewish, and Muslim populations. It also has the largest Latter-day Saint population outside of Utah. The state also has a large American Jewish community, the second-largest in the nation, as well as largest in the Western US, and third-largest in the world, mainly concentrated in Los Angeles, Beverly Hills, San Francisco, Oakland, Sacramento, and Palm Springs.

California also has large Muslim communities in west Los Angeles, San Diego, Beverly Hills, Orange County, Santa Clara County, and the Modesto area.

Most Catholics in California are of Mexican, Central American, Irish, German, Italian, Vietnamese, Filipino, and Korean ancestry. The population of Catholic Californians is rapidly growing due to the influx of Latin American, Asian, African, and Middle Eastern Christian immigrants. In the Archdiocese of Los Angeles, Sunday Mass is celebrated in 42 different languages representing more than 30 ethnic groups from around the world. The Catholic dioceses of Orange, Los Angeles and San Jose have the largest Catholic diaspora of Vietnamese Catholics in world outside of Vietnam, estimated to be about 250,000-300,000 Catholics out of a total Vietnamese California population of 1.3 Million.

The largest Christian denominations in California in 2000 were the Catholic Church with 10,079,310; the Church of Jesus Christ of Latter-day Saints with 529,575; and the Southern Baptist Convention with 471,119. Jewish congregations had in the same year 994,000 adherents, or 3% of the Californian population.

Hinduism, Buddhism, Shintō, Sikhism, and Taoism were introduced in part by Asian immigrants. As the 20th century came to a close, forty percent of all Buddhists in America resided in Southern California. The Los Angeles metropolitan area has become unique in the Buddhist world as the only place where representative organizations of every major school of Buddhism can be found in a single urban center. The City of Ten Thousand Buddhas in Northern California and Hsi Lai Temple in Southern California are two of the largest Buddhist temples in the Western Hemisphere.

California has the highest Hindu population in the United States, most of them Indian Americans. Many of the prominent Hindu temples including the Malibu Hindu Temple are located in California.

With more than 1,232,000 Jews as of 2015, California has the highest number of Jews of any state except New York. Many Jews live in the West Los Angeles and (esp. west) San Fernando Valley regions of Los Angeles. Historic synagogues include Beth Jacob Congregation (Beverly Hills, California), Congregation B'nai Israel (Sacramento, California), and Temple Israel (Stockton, California). Chabad, The Rohr Jewish Learning Institute, and Aish HaTorah are active in California.

California also has the largest Muslim community in the United States, an estimated one percent of the population, mostly residing in Southern California. Approximately 100,000 Muslims reside in San Diego.

California has more members of The Church of Jesus Christ of Latter-day Saints and Temples than any state except Utah. Latter-day Saints (Mormons) have played important roles in the settlement of California throughout the state's history. For example, a group of a few hundred Latter-day Saint converts from the Northeastern United States and Europe arrived at what would become San Francisco in the 1840s aboard the ship Brooklyn, more than doubling the population of the small town. A group of Latter-day Saints also established the city of San Bernardino in Southern California in 1851. According to the LDS Church 2014 statistics, 780,200 Latter-day Saints reside in the state of California, attending almost 1400 congregations statewide.

The Seventh-day Adventist Church is headquartered in Loma Linda in San Bernardino county 60 miles east of Los Angeles, where the church members form the majority of the town's population. The SDA church there has a university, a free hospital and a TV station (3ABN or the 3 Angels Broadcasting Network). The town is known for a large number of centenarians.

A Pew Research Center survey revealed, however, that California is less religious than the rest of the United States: 62% of Californians say they are "absolutely certain" of the belief "in God or a universal spirit", while in the nation 71% say so. The survey also revealed that 48% of Californians say religion is "very important", while the figure for the US in general is 56%.

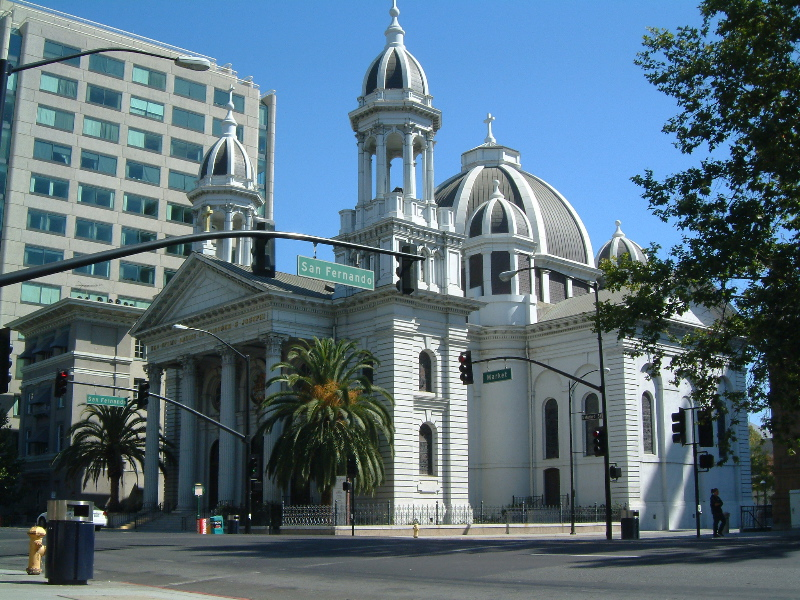
Cathedral Basilica of St. Joseph in San Jose

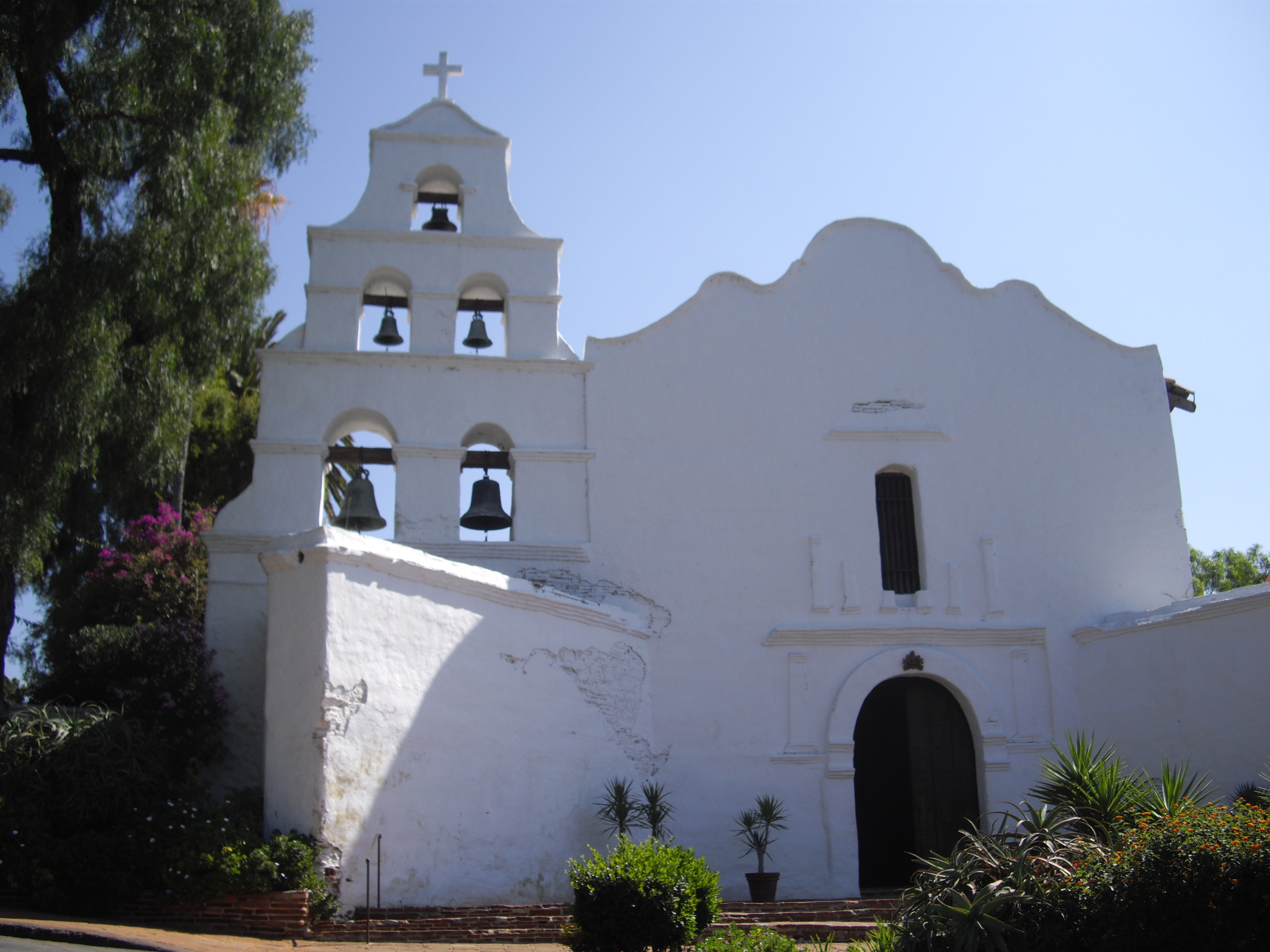
Mission San Diego de Alcalá

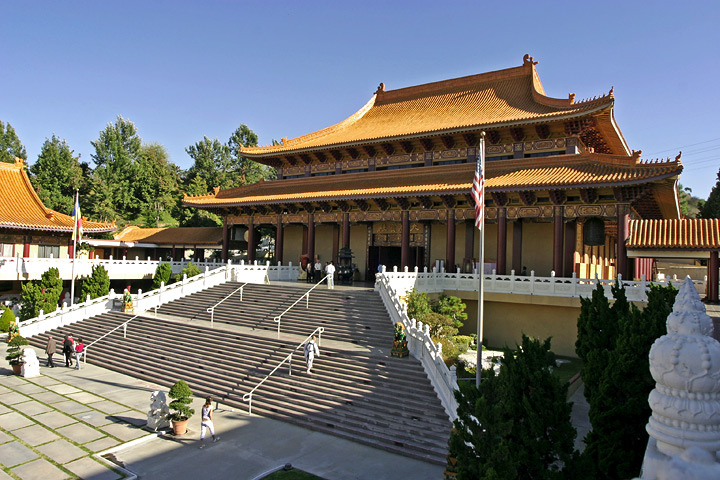
Hsi Lai Temple in Los Angeles County

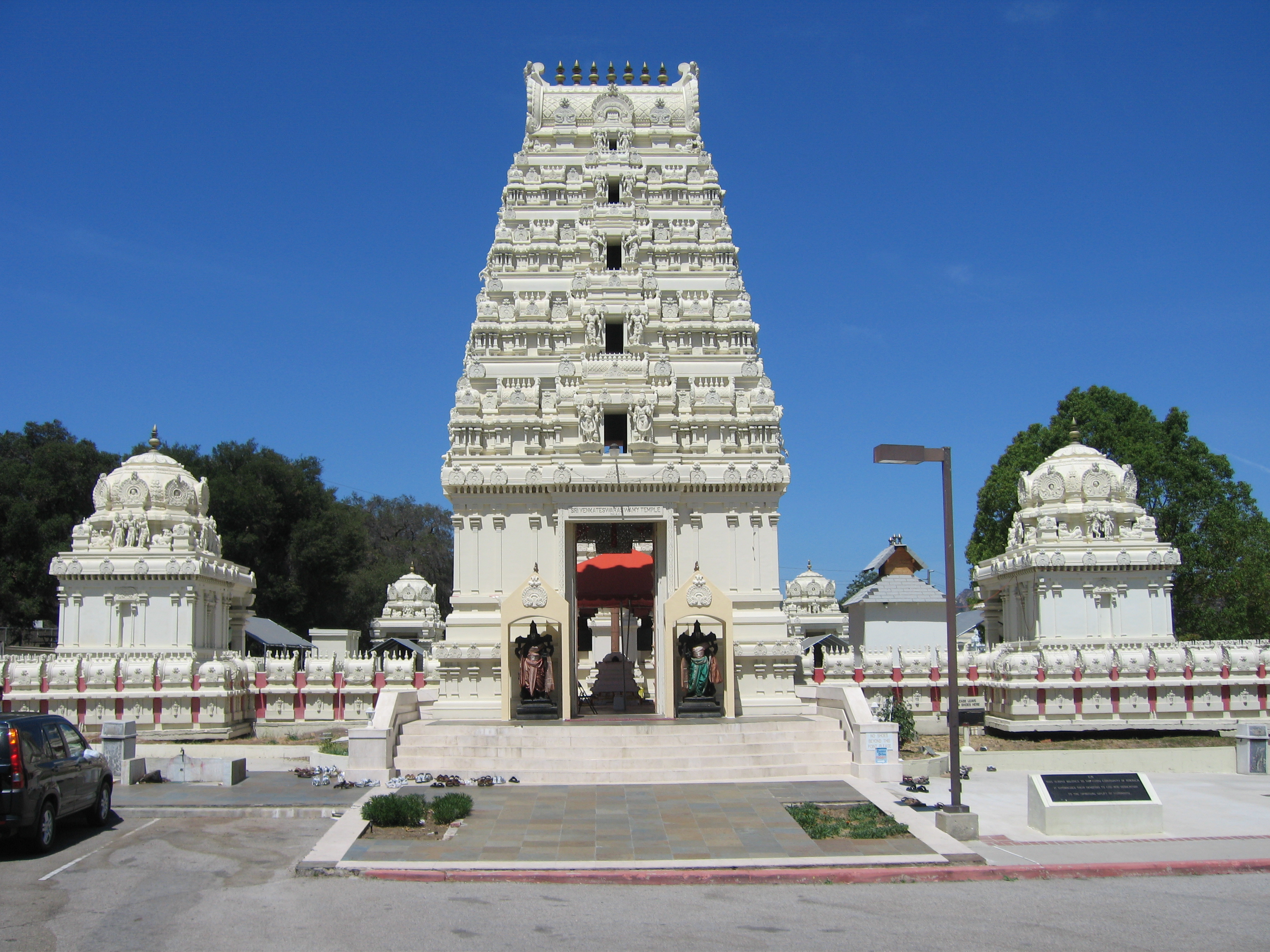
South Indian style Malibu Hindu Temple

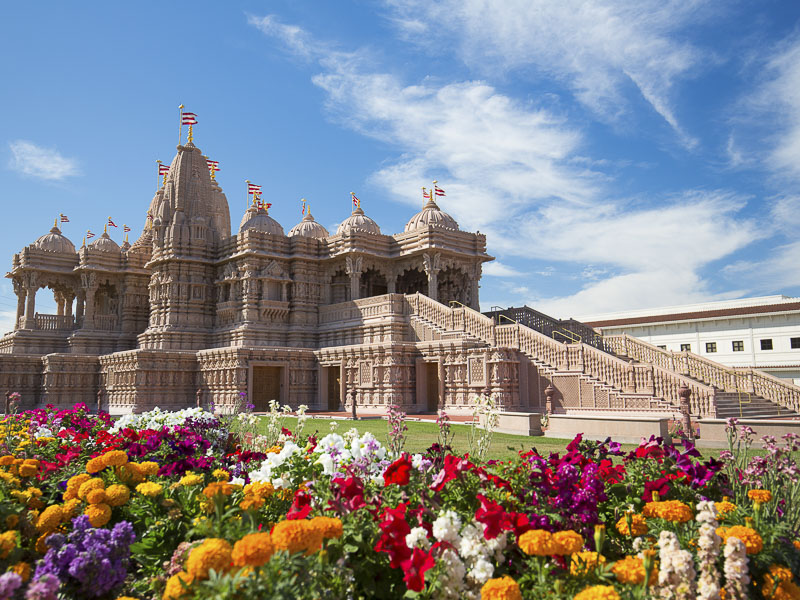
North Indian style BAPS Shri Swaminarayan Mandir in Chino Hills

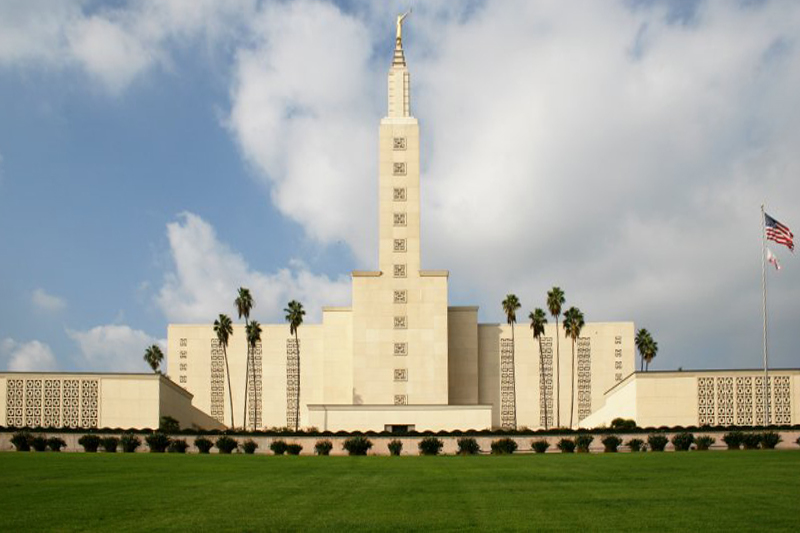
Los Angeles California Temple

According to Pew Forum there are less than 1% Wiccans and other pagans in state with Central Valley Wicca and Reclaiming Wicca as key.

== Income and socioeconomic factors ==
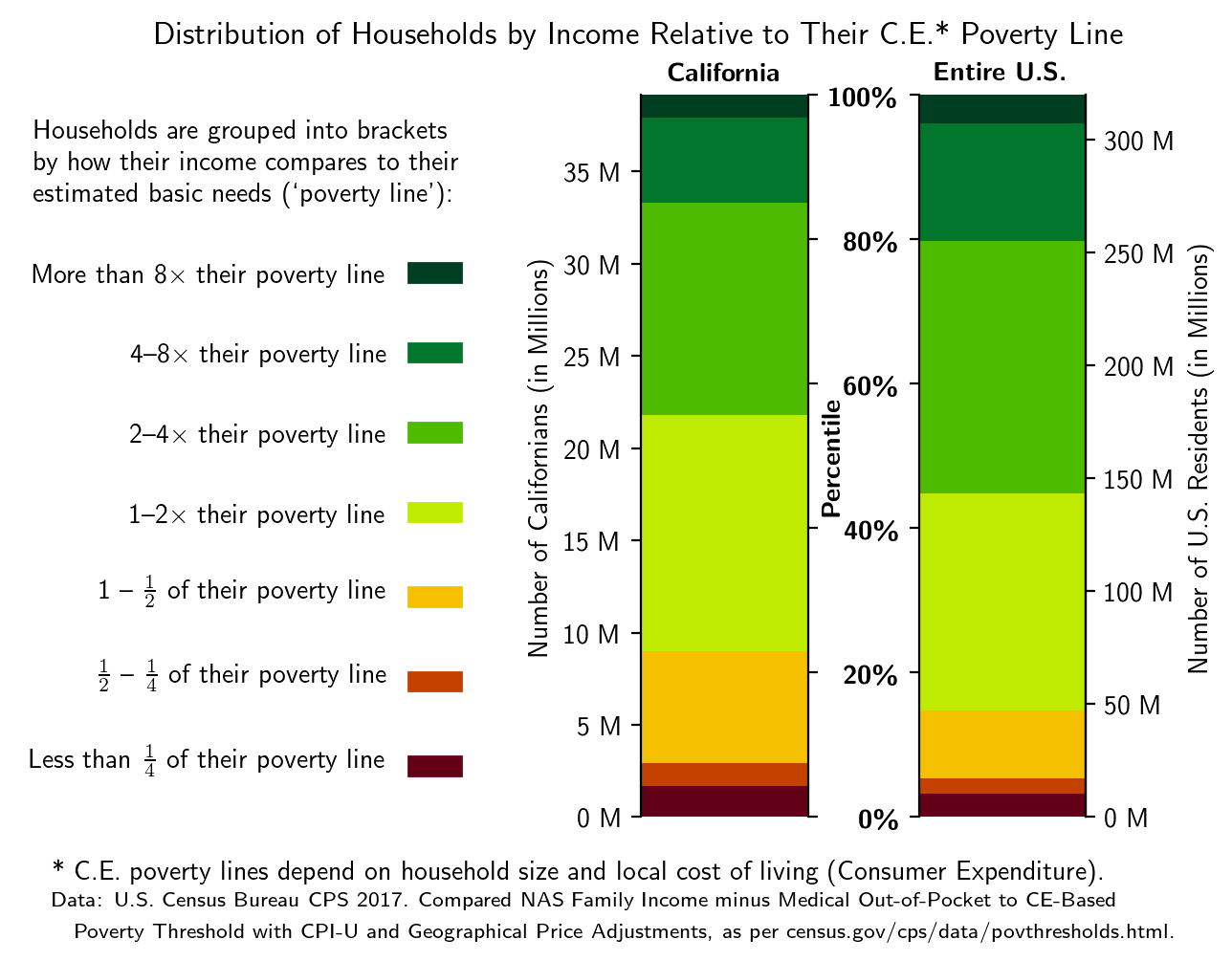
Legend: A comparison of the distributions of California (left) and US (right) households by their income relative to their estimated cost of living, showing the higher rates of poverty and near-poverty in California. Uses 2017 CPS data about incomes in 2016. Comparison is of NAS Family Income minus Medical Out-of-Pocket to CE-Based Poverty Threshold with CPI-U and Geographical Price Adjustments, as per .

California's Per Capita Income Distribution by County

Total California per capita income (wikidata:Q99) = 38,576 US$ (2020 survey methodology)

[Hide/show County Per Capita Income]
No.	California	per capita income US$	year	Wikidata page
1	Alameda County, California	49,883	2020	Q107146
2	Alpine County, California	37,690	2020	Q108077
3	Amador County, California	33,897	2020	Q156177
4	Butte County, California	30,700	2020	Q156181
5	Calaveras County, California	33,027	2020	Q271613
6	Colusa County, California	27,614	2020	Q271609
7	Contra Costa County, California	50,118	2020	Q108058
8	Del Norte County, California	24,361	2020	Q156186
9	El Dorado County, California	44,651	2020	Q108093
10	Fresno County, California	25,757	2020	Q271915
11	Glenn County, California	23,715	2020	Q271601
12	Humboldt County, California	29,584	2020	Q109651
13	Imperial County, California	18,064	2020	Q169952
14	Inyo County, California	33,404	2020	Q109670
15	Kern County, California	23,855	2020	Q108047
16	Kings County, California	22,919	2020	Q156358
17	Lake County, California	29,714	2020	Q156361
18	Lassen County, California	20,928	2020	Q156340
19	Los Angeles County, California	35,685	2020	Q104994
20	Madera County, California	23,212	2020	Q109661
21	Marin County, California	74,446	2020	Q108117
22	Mariposa County, California	29,882	2020	Q156191
23	Mendocino County, California	30,351	2020	Q108087
24	Merced County, California	23,677	2020	Q109690
25	Modoc County, California	25,578	2020	Q109695
26	Mono County, California	37,103	2020	Q156366
27	Monterey County, California	32,122	2020	Q108072
28	Napa County, California	46,912	2020	Q108137
29	Nevada County, California	41,079	2020	Q109681
30	Orange County, California	43,049	2020	Q5925
31	Placer County, California	46,023	2020	Q156353
32	Plumas County, California	34,334	2020	Q156342
33	Riverside County, California	29,913	2020	Q108111
34	Sacramento County, California	34,078	2020	Q108131
35	San Benito County, California	33,841	2020	Q109656
36	San Bernardino County, California	26,402	2020	Q108053
37	San Diego County, California	39,737	2020	Q108143
38	San Francisco	72,041	2020	Q62
39	San Joaquin County, California	28,928	2020	Q108499
40	San Luis Obispo County, California	38,686	2020	Q49014
41	San Mateo County, California	64,450	2020	Q108101
42	Santa Barbara County, California	38,141	2020	Q108106
43	Santa Clara County, California	59,297	2020	Q110739
44	Santa Cruz County, California	44,278	2020	Q108122
45	Shasta County, California	31,049	2020	Q156350
46	Sierra County, California	32,533	2020	Q156370
47	Siskiyou County, California	29,381	2020	Q156374
48	Solano County, California	36,685	2020	Q108083
49	Sonoma County, California	44,071	2020	Q108067
50	Stanislaus County, California	27,225	2020	Q108503
51	Sutter County, California	29,495	2020	Q156377
52	Tehama County, California	29,012	2020	Q109705
53	Trinity County, California	26,228	2020	Q156188
54	Tulare County, California	22,092	2020	Q109686
55	Tuolumne County, California	35,694	2020	Q156346
56	Ventura County, California	39,403	2020	Q108127
57	Yolo County, California	36,036	2020	Q109709
58	Yuba County, California	25,774	2020	Q196014

California's income distribution is quite broad compared to the country's as a whole; its proportions of residents with no income and of residents with income over $100,000 are both higher than the national average. This broad distribution combined with high housing and living costs give California an abnormally high poverty rate. The Census Bureau's Supplemental Poverty Measure, calculated by comparing household income to a locally adjusted poverty threshold, reports that 20.7% of California's population has income insufficient for their basic needs, as compared to 12.9% for the US as a whole. This calculation of income includes the benefits of California welfare programs such as food stamps and earned income tax credits — without these, the state's poverty rate would be 28%.

The trends of low income in California are complex; from 1975 to 2014, real (inflation-adjusted) incomes have alternated between rises and sharp declines. These incomes have decreased overall for those outside the top 20th percentile, with the bottom 20th percentile seeing an average decline of 1% per year during that period. Correspondingly, the percent of Californians with income below their poverty threshold has risen and fallen, but has on average increased by a tenth of a percentage point per year.

Increasing income inequality has had many effects on Californians' lives, including on life expectancy, which can be taken as a proxy for health or even general welfare. A study conducted by Clarke et al. related life expectancy to socioeconomic status (SES, an index including income and other related factors), finding that Californians in the top 20% by SES live on average six years longer than those in the bottom 20% (81 years, compared to 75). This disparity becomes even more pronounced when intersected with race: White males in the top 20% live 14 years longer than African American males in the bottom 20% (for females, the difference is 10 years).

The complexity of the state's low-income trends were visible when, in response to growing Chinese and Spanish-speaking populations, the city of Oakland implemented the nation's first policy of recruiting bilingual applicants for public-facing city jobs in 2001. This increased the employment of Hispanic and Chinese bilinguals throughout the public workforce, but also lowered (monolingual) Black employment.

== See also ==
- California locations by race
- California statistical areas
- California exodus
- Demographics of the United States
- Mexifornia
- Okies - massive historical migration of rural white people to California
