= List of California urban areas =

This is a list of urban areas in California as defined by the U.S. Census Bureau, ordered according to their 2020 census populations. The list includes urban areas with a population of at least 10,000. Rows in green indicate that part of the area lies outside of California. Rows without a rank indicate that the center of the area is outside of California.

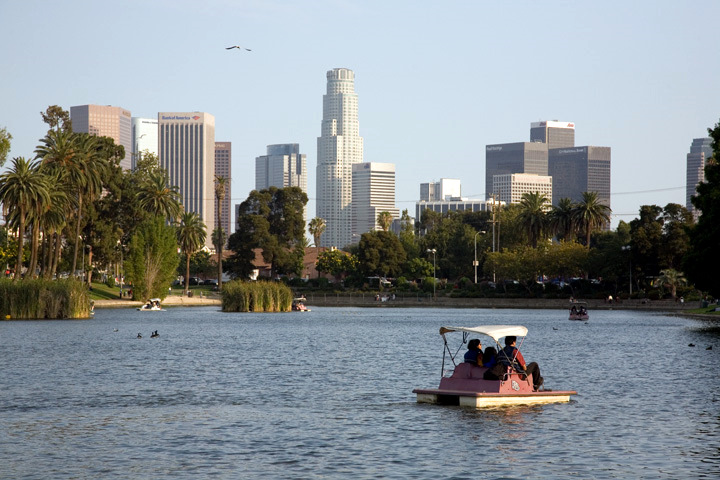
1 - Los Angeles

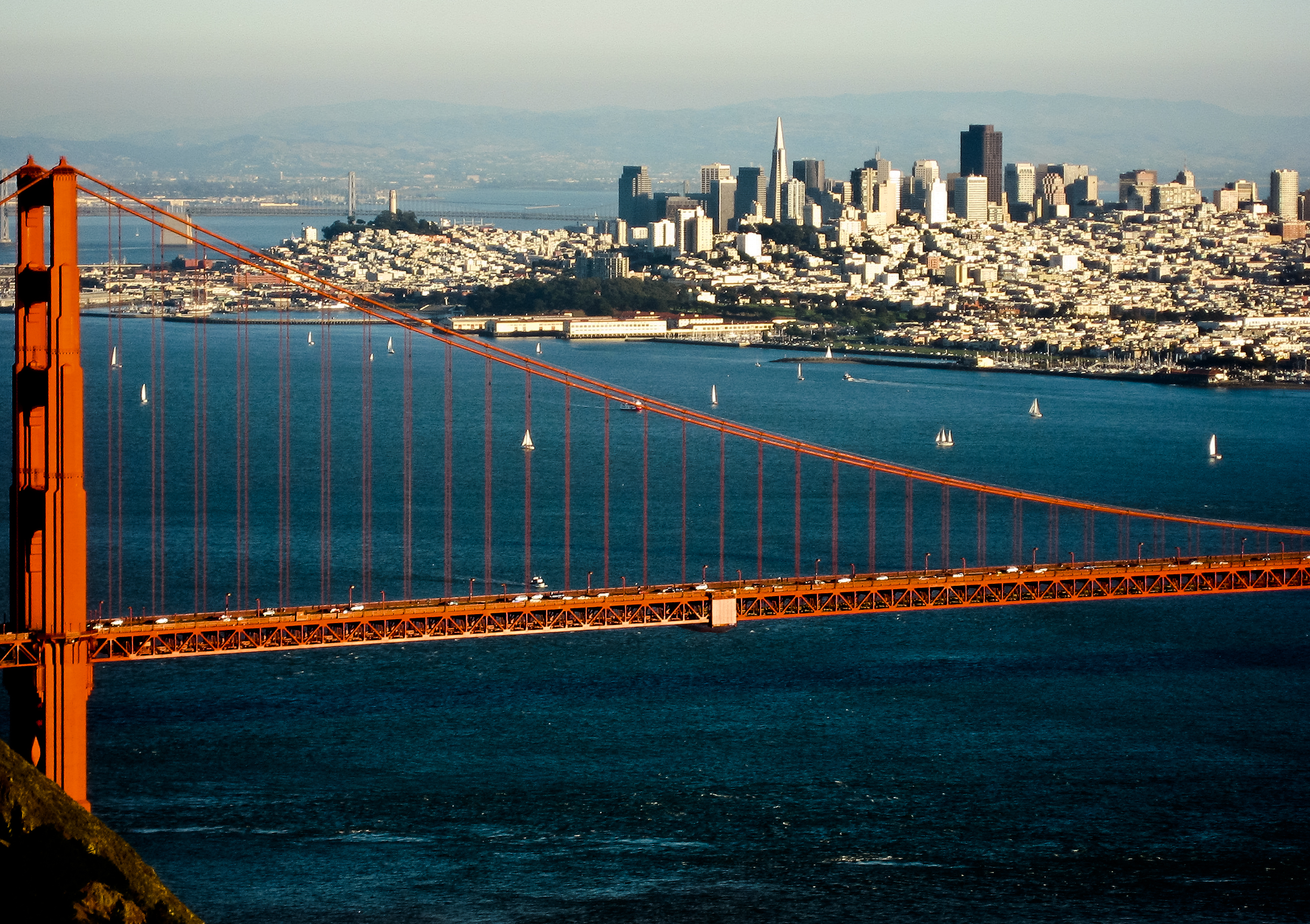
2 - San Francisco

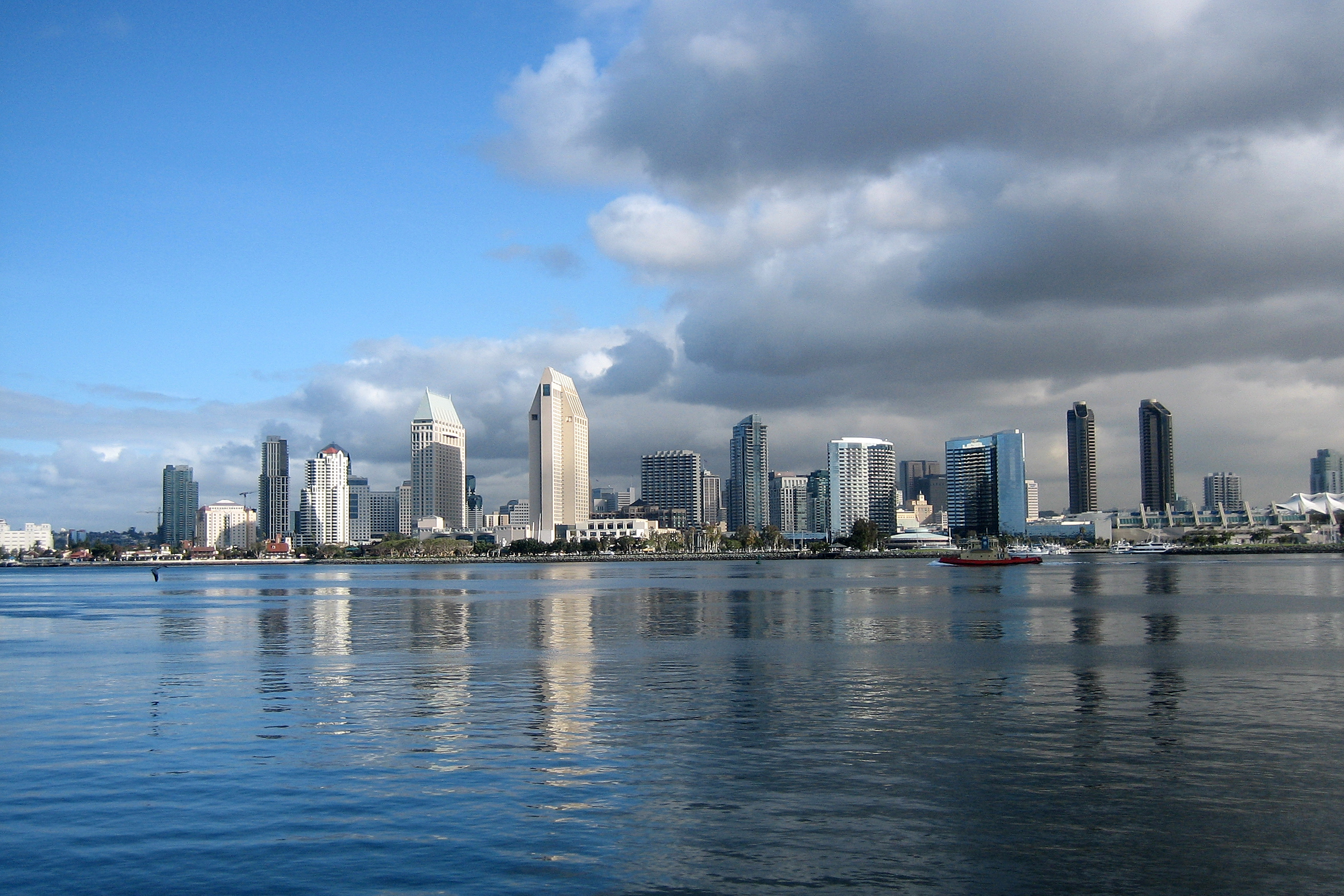
3 - San Diego

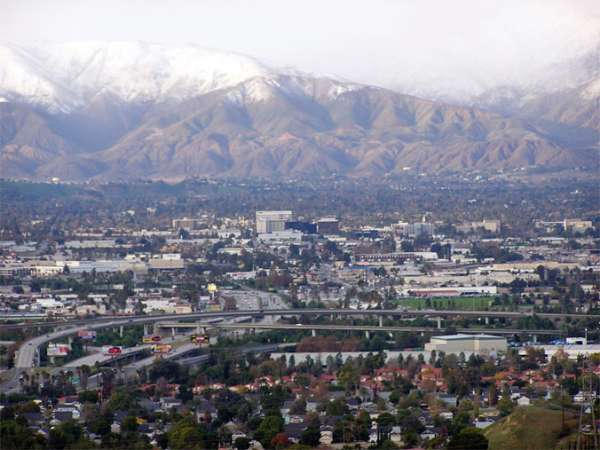
4 - San Bernardino

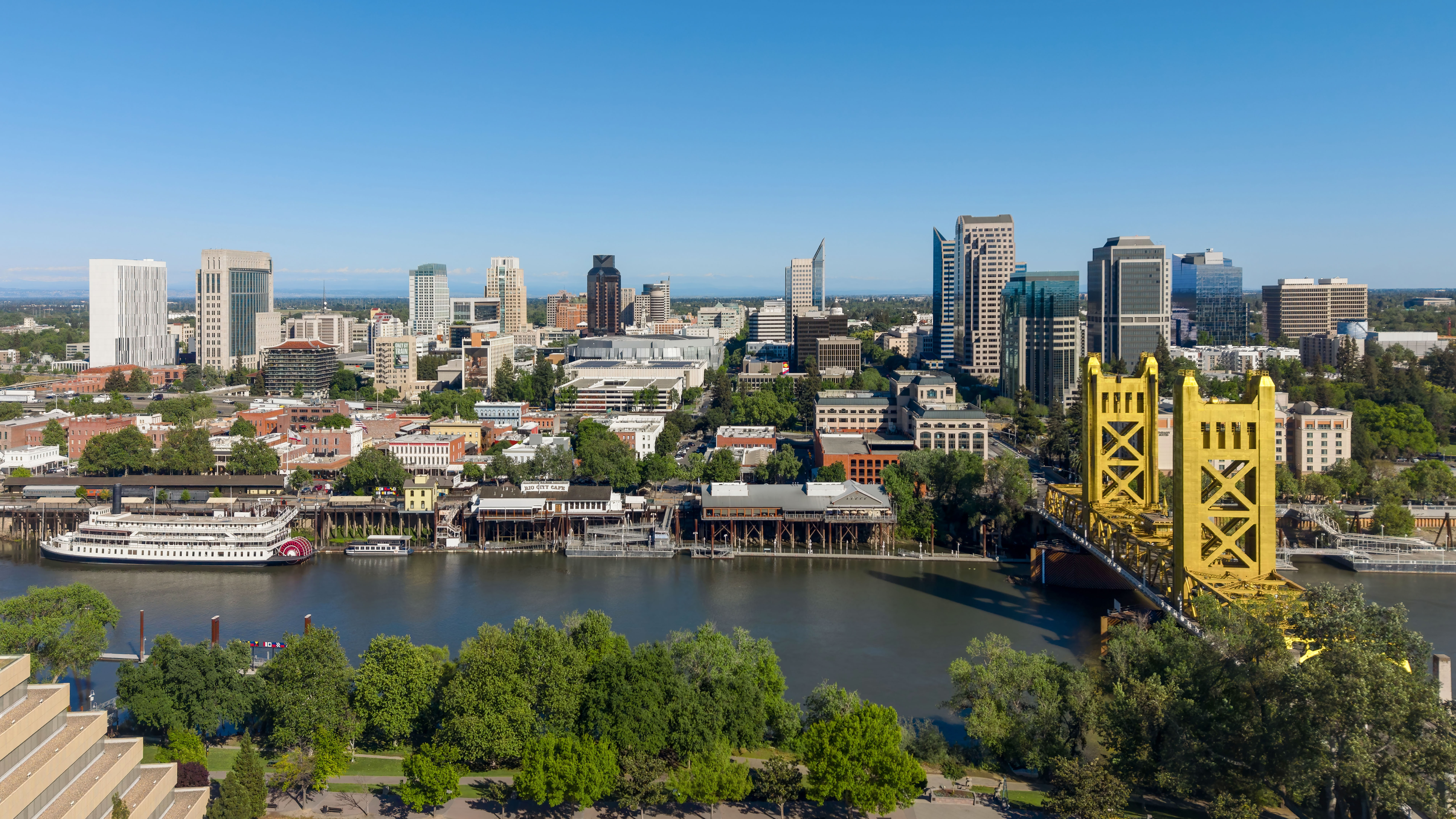
5 - Sacramento

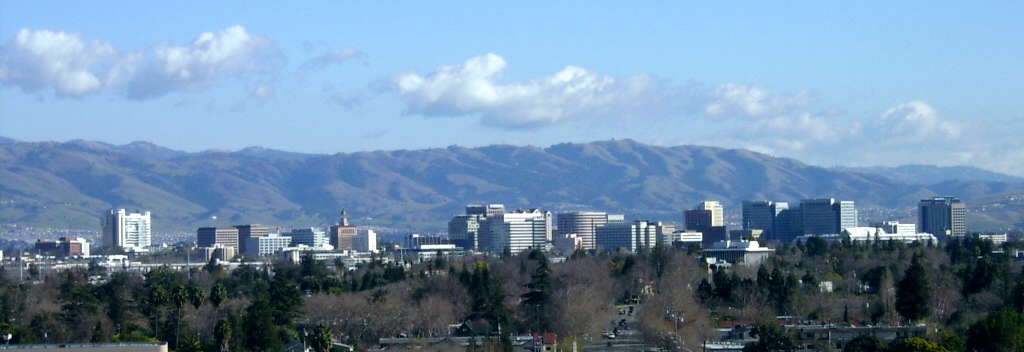
6 - San Jose

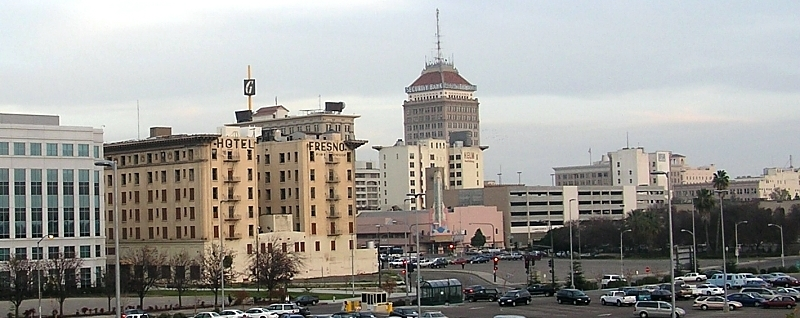
7 - Fresno

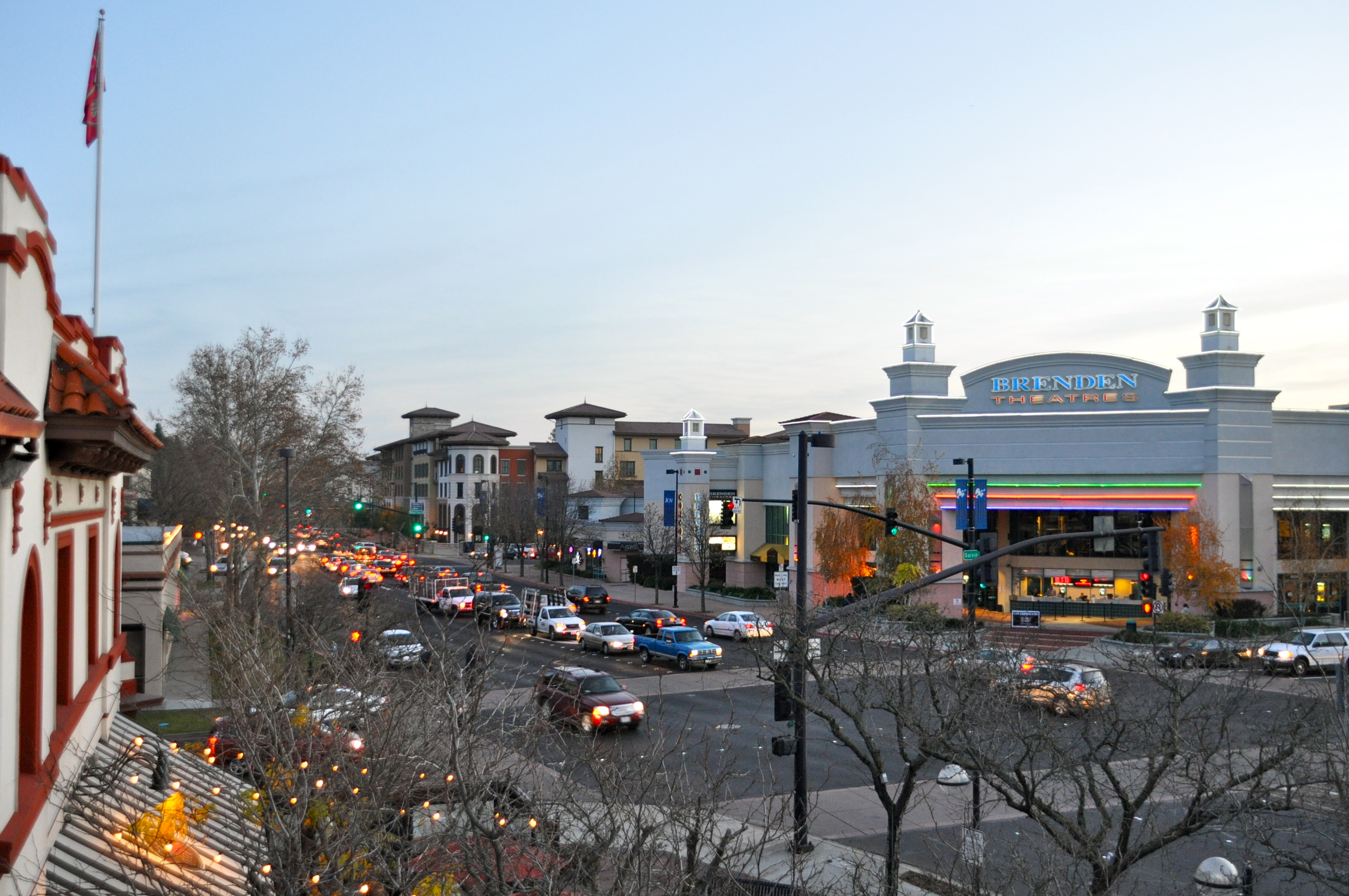
8 - Concord

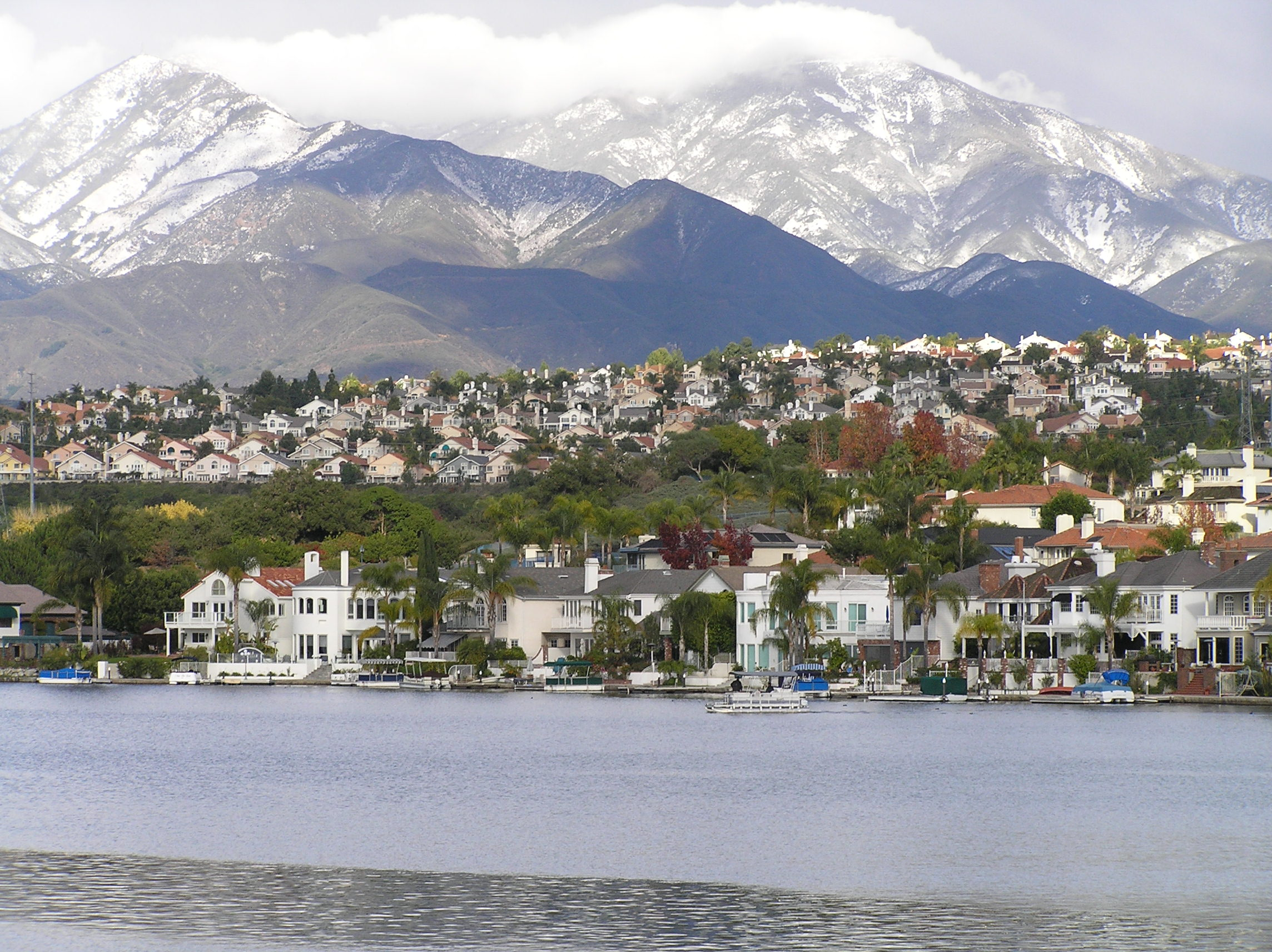
9 - Mission Viejo

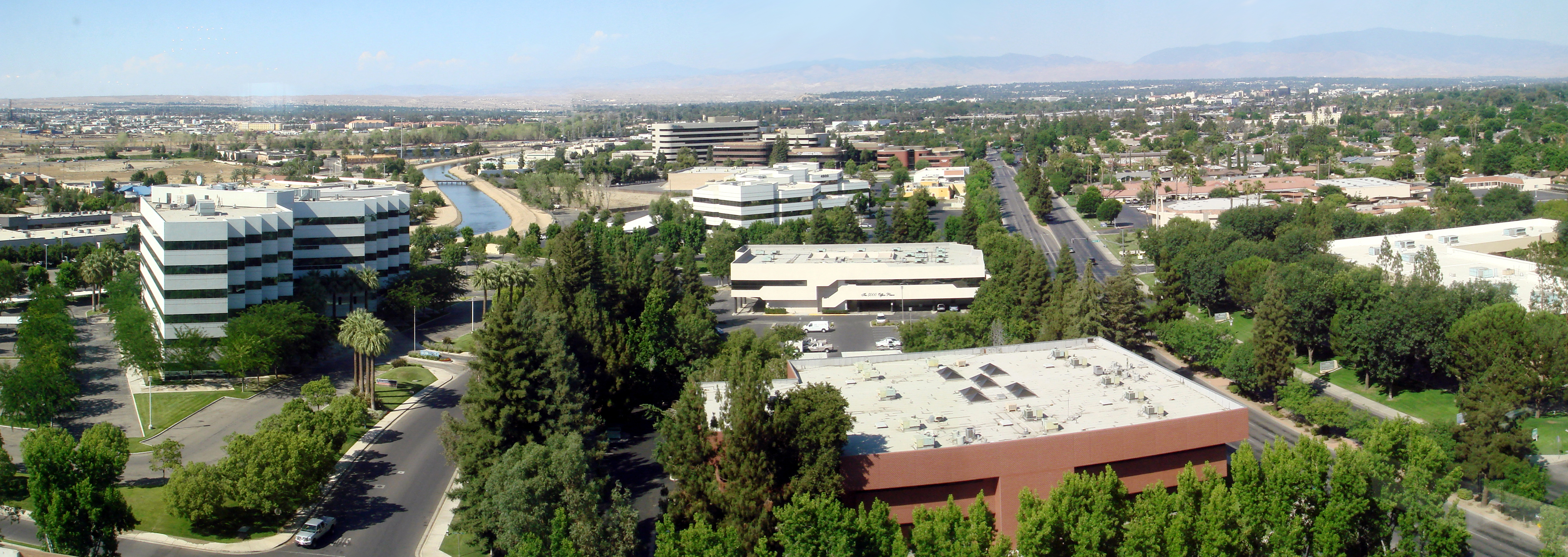
10 - Bakersfield

Rank	Name (Note: In order to match the official lists from the U.S. Census Bureau and provide less clutter in the table, postal code abbreviations for the names of states are used in this column. For a list of the states and abbreviations used, please see the table below the map at this list of US States.)	Population (2020 census)
1	Los Angeles-Long Beach-Anaheim	12,237,376
2	San Francisco-Oakland	3,515,933
3	San Diego	3,070,300
4	Riverside-San Bernardino	2,276,703
5	Sacramento	1,946,618
6	San Jose	1,837,446
7	Fresno	717,589
8	Mission Viejo-Lake Forest-Laguna Niguel	646,843
9	Bakersfield	570,235
10	Concord-Walnut Creek	538,583
11	Temecula-Murrieta-Menifee	528,991
-	Reno, NV-CA	446,529
12	Stockton	414,847
13	Oxnard-Ventura	376,117
14	Indio-Palm Desert-Palm Springs	361,075
15	Palmdale-Lancaster	359,559
16	Modesto	357,301
17	Victorville-Hesperia-Apple Valley	355,816
18	Antioch	326,205
19	Santa Rosa	297,329
20	Santa Clarita	278,031
21	Livermore-Pleasanton-Dublin	240,381
22	Thousand Oaks	213,986
23	Santa Barbara	202,197
24	Salinas	177,532
25	Vallejo	175,132
26	Hemet	173,194
27	Santa Cruz	169,038
28	Visalia	160,578
29	Fairfield	150,122
30	Merced	150,052
31	Santa Maria	143,609
-	Yuma, AZ-CA	135,717
32	Simi Valley	127,364
33	Yuba City	125,706
34	Seaside-Monterey-Pacific Grove	123,495
35	Tracy-Mountain House	120,912
36	Redding	120,602
37	Gilroy-Morgan Hill	114,833
38	Chico	111,411
39	Vacaville	101,027
40	Manteca	86,674
41	Napa	84,619
42	Madera	81,635
43	Turlock	79,203
44	Davis	77,034
45	Camarillo	76,338
46	El Centro	74,376
47	Lodi	73,090
48	Tulare	70,628
49	Porterville	69,862
50	Watsonville	68,668
51	Paso Robles-Atascadero	67,804
52	Hanford	66,638
53	Petaluma	65,227
54	Woodland	61,133
55	San Luis Obispo	56,904
56	Lompoc	54,287
57	Arroyo Grande-Grover Beach-Pismo Beach	50,885
58	Reedley--Dinuba	49,614
59	Hollister	49,611
60	Eureka	45,951
61	Desert Hot Springs	45,767
62	Los Banos	45,533
63	Delano	44,410
64	Fallbrook	41,305
65	Oroville	40,190
66	Calexico	38,491
67	Grass Valley	36,720
68	Selma	32,546
69	Sonoma	31,479
70	Auburn	31,371
71	South Lake Tahoe, CA-NV	31,363
72	Santa Paula	30,675
73	Barstow	30,522
74	Ridgecrest	29,307
75	Sonora-Twain Harte	29,013
76	Ukiah	28,987
77	Sanger	27,325
78	Lemoore	26,957
79	Galt	26,618
80	Brawley	26,270
81	Oakdale	25,408
82	Patterson	23,660
83	Placerville-Diamond Springs	23,291
84	Corcoran	22,377
85	Crestline-Lake Arrowhead	22,272
86	Wasco	22,235
87	Half Moon Bay	21,688
88	Nipomo	20,303
89	Red Bluff	19,826
90	Arcata	19,714
-	Incline Village, NV-CA	19,441
91	Arvin	19,385
92	Shafter	19,278
93	Soledad	18,946
94	Dixon	18,876
95	Greenfield	18,858
96	Sebastopol	18,734
97	Yucca Valley	18,293
98	Rosamond	17,538
99	Clearlake	17,351
100	Tehachapi-Golden Hills	17,298
101	Big Bear City	16,498
102	Fillmore	16,397
103	Kerman	16,002
104	Discovery Bay	15,939
105	Ripon	15,829
106	Crescent City	15,620
107	Lamont	15,271
108	Taft	15,022
109	McKinleyville	14,981
110	Ramona	14,837
111	Parlier	14,522
112	Livingston	14,255
113	McFarland	14,149
114	Los Osos	13,978
115	Lindsay	13,942
116	King City	13,760
117	Mendota	13,382
118	Alpine	13,307
119	Avenal	13,304
120	Chowchilla	13,196
121	Morro Bay	13,163
122	Coalinga	13,049
123	Twentynine Palms	12,881
124	Orosi	12,795
125	Fortuna	12,784
126	Truckee	12,756
127	Kingsburg	12,602
128	Newman	12,387
129	Castroville-Prunedale	12,334
130	Blythe, CA-AZ	11,780
131	Twentynine Palms North	11,665
132	Bishop	11,013
133	Exeter	10,973
134	Fort Bragg	10,668
135	Solvang-Santa Ynez	10,295
136	Delhi	10,274

== See also ==
- California statistical areas
