= List of U.S. states and territories by race and ethnicity =

This is a list of the 50 U.S. states, the 5 populated U.S. territories, and the District of Columbia by race/ethnicity. It includes a sortable table of population by race/ethnicity. The table excludes Hispanics from the racial categories, assigning them to their own category. The table also excludes all mixed raced/multiracial persons from the racial categories, assigning them to their own category. The information on Guam, the Northern Mariana Islands, and American Samoa, add up to more than 100% as the racial data for Hispanics was not broken out separately in the 2020 Census.

== Race/ethnicity by U.S. state and territory ==
Racial / Ethnic Profile of the United States by State and Territory (2020 Census) (NH = Non-Hispanic)
State	Total Population	White alone (NH)	%	Black or African American alone (NH)	%	Native American or Alaska Native alone (NH)	%	Asian alone (NH)	%	Pacific Islander alone (NH)	%	Some Other Race alone (NH)	%	Mixed Race or Multi-Racial (NH)	%	Hispanic or Latino (any race)	%
United States of America (50 states and D.C.)	331,449,281	191,697,647	57.84%	39,940,338	12.05%	2,251,699	0.68%	19,618,719	5.92%	622,018	0.19%	1,689,833	0.51%	13,548,983	4.09%	62,080,044	18.73%
United States of America (50 states, D.C., and Puerto Rico)	334,735,155	191,722,195	57.28%	39,944,624	11.93%	2,252,011	0.67%	19,621,465	5.86%	622,109	0.19%	1,692,341	0.51%	13,551,323	4.05%	65,329,087	19.52%
Alabama	5,024,279	3,171,351	63.12%	1,288,159	25.64%	23,119	0.46%	75,918	1.51%	2,612	0.05%	14,455	0.29%	184,618	3.67%	264,047	5.26%
Alaska	733,391	421,758	57.51%	20,731	2.83%	108,838	14.84%	43,449	5.92%	12,455	1.70%	4,575	0.62%	71,761	9.78%	49,824	6.79%
Arizona	7,151,502	3,816,547	53.37%	317,161	4.43%	263,930	3.69%	248,837	3.48%	14,323	0.20%	31,611	0.44%	266,840	3.73%	2,192,253	30.65%
Arkansas	3,011,524	2,063,550	68.52%	449,884	14.94%	20,549	0.68%	51,210	1.70%	14,280	0.47%	8,047	0.27%	147,157	4.89%	256,847	8.53%
California	39,538,223	13,714,587	34.69%	2,119,286	5.36%	156,085	0.39%	5,978,795	15.12%	138,167	0.35%	223,929	0.57%	1,627,722	4.12%	15,579,652	39.40%
Colorado	5,773,714	3,760,663	65.13%	221,310	3.83%	33,768	0.58%	195,220	3.38%	9,005	0.16%	29,560	0.51%	260,798	4.52%	1,263,390	21.88%
Connecticut	3,605,944	2,279,232	63.21%	360,937	10.01%	6,404	0.18%	170,459	4.73%	974	0.03%	27,076	0.75%	137,569	3.82%	623,293	17.29%
Delaware	989,948	579,851	58.57%	212,960	21.51%	2,521	0.25%	42,398	4.28%	304	0.03%	4,601	0.46%	43,023	4.35%	104,290	10.53%
District of Columbia	689,545	261,771	37.96%	282,066	40.91%	1,277	0.19%	33,192	4.81%	349	0.05%	3,753	0.54%	29,485	4.28%	77,652	11.26%
Florida	21,538,187	11,100,503	51.54%	3,127,052	14.52%	42,169	0.20%	629,626	2.92%	11,521	0.05%	137,933	0.64%	792,143	3.68%	5,697,240	26.45%
(Georgia (U.S. state)) Georgia	10,711,908	5,362,156	50.06%	3,278,119	30.60%	20,375	0.19%	475,680	4.44%	6,101	0.06%	55,887	0.52%	390,133	3.64%	1,123,457	10.49%
Hawaii	1,455,271	314,365	21.60%	21,877	1.50%	2,321	0.16%	531,558	36.53%	149,054	10.24%	5,283	0.36%	291,890	20.06%	138,923	9.55%
Idaho	1,839,106	1,450,523	78.87%	14,785	0.80%	18,903	1.03%	26,036	1.42%	3,401	0.18%	8,243	0.45%	77,808	4.23%	239,407	13.02%
Illinois	12,812,508	7,472,751	58.32%	1,775,612	13.86%	16,561	0.13%	747,280	5.83%	2,959	0.02%	45,080	0.35%	414,855	3.24%	2,337,410	18.24%
Indiana	6,785,528	5,121,004	75.47%	637,500	9.39%	12,938	0.19%	166,651	2.46%	2,761	0.04%	25,139	0.37%	265,344	3.91%	554,191	8.17%
Iowa	3,190,369	2,638,201	82.69%	129,321	4.05%	9,079	0.28%	75,017	2.35%	5,605	0.18%	8,487	0.27%	108,673	3.41%	215,986	6.77%
Kansas	2,937,880	2,122,575	72.25%	163,352	5.56%	21,921	0.75%	85,225	2.90%	3,115	0.11%	10,064	0.34%	149,025	5.07%	382,603	13.02%
Kentucky	4,505,836	3,664,764	81.33%	357,764	7.94%	8,080	0.18%	73,843	1.64%	3,462	0.08%	14,706	0.33%	175,363	3.89%	207,854	4.61%
Louisiana	4,657,757	2,596,702	55.75%	1,452,420	31.18%	25,994	0.56%	85,336	1.83%	1,706	0.04%	16,954	0.36%	156,096	3.35%	322,549	6.92%
Maine	1,362,359	1,228,264	90.16%	25,115	1.84%	7,293	0.54%	16,668	1.22%	407	0.03%	4,430	0.33%	53,573	3.93%	26,609	1.95%
Maryland	6,177,224	2,913,782	47.17%	1,795,027	29.06%	12,055	0.20%	417,962	6.77%	2,575	0.04%	35,314	0.57%	270,764	4.38%	729,745	11.81%
Massachusetts	7,029,917	4,748,897	67.55%	457,055	6.50%	9,387	0.13%	504,900	7.18%	1,607	0.02%	92,108	1.31%	328,278	4.67%	887,685	12.63%
Michigan	10,077,331	7,295,651	72.40%	1,358,458	13.48%	47,406	0.47%	332,288	3.30%	2,603	0.03%	37,183	0.37%	439,320	4.36%	564,422	5.60%
Minnesota	5,706,494	4,353,880	76.30%	392,850	6.88%	57,046	1.00%	297,460	5.21%	2,621	0.05%	20,963	0.37%	236,034	4.14%	345,640	6.06%
Mississippi	2,961,279	1,639,077	55.35%	1,079,001	36.44%	14,019	0.47%	32,305	1.09%	1,037	0.04%	7,174	0.24%	83,446	2.82%	105,220	3.55%
Missouri	6,154,913	4,663,907	75.78%	692,774	11.26%	23,496	0.38%	132,158	2.15%	9,293	0.15%	22,377	0.36%	307,840	5.00%	303,068	4.92%
Montana	1,084,225	901,318	83.13%	5,077	0.47%	64,592	5.96%	8,077	0.74%	839	0.08%	4,374	0.40%	54,749	5.05%	45,199	4.17%
Nebraska	1,961,504	1,484,687	75.69%	94,405	4.81%	15,051	0.77%	52,359	2.67%	1,318	0.07%	6,335	0.32%	72,634	3.70%	234,715	11.97%
Nevada	3,104,614	1,425,952	45.93%	291,960	9.40%	23,392	0.75%	265,991	8.57%	22,970	0.74%	17,171	0.55%	166,921	5.38%	890,257	28.68%
New Hampshire	1,377,529	1,200,649	87.16%	18,655	1.35%	2,299	0.17%	35,604	2.58%	388	0.03%	5,916	0.43%	54,564	3.96%	59,454	4.32%
New Jersey	9,288,994	4,816,381	51.85%	1,154,142	12.42%	11,206	0.12%	942,921	10.15%	1,944	0.02%	70,354	0.76%	289,471	3.12%	2,002,575	21.56%
New Mexico	2,117,522	772,952	36.50%	38,330	1.81%	188,610	8.91%	35,261	1.67%	1,451	0.07%	10,340	0.49%	59,767	2.82%	1,010,811	47.74%
New York	20,201,249	10,598,907	52.47%	2,759,022	13.66%	54,908	0.27%	1,916,329	9.49%	6,097	0.03%	197,107	0.98%	720,847	3.57%	3,948,032	19.54%
North Carolina	10,439,388	6,312,148	60.46%	2,107,526	20.19%	100,886	0.97%	340,059	3.26%	6,980	0.07%	46,340	0.44%	406,853	3.90%	1,118,596	10.72%
North Dakota	779,094	636,160	81.65%	26,152	3.36%	37,350	4.79%	13,050	1.68%	869	0.11%	1,853	0.24%	30,248	3.88%	33,412	4.29%
Ohio	11,799,448	8,954,135	75.89%	1,457,180	12.35%	18,949	0.16%	296,604	2.51%	4,493	0.04%	45,217	0.38%	501,562	4.25%	521,308	4.42%
Oklahoma	3,959,353	2,407,188	60.80%	283,242	7.15%	311,890	7.88%	89,653	2.26%	8,168	0.21%	13,602	0.34%	373,679	9.44%	471,931	11.92%
Oregon	4,237,256	3,036,158	71.65%	78,658	1.86%	42,042	0.99%	191,797	4.53%	18,197	0.43%	22,962	0.54%	258,685	6.11%	588,757	13.89%
Pennsylvania	13,002,700	9,553,417	73.47%	1,368,978	10.53%	15,028	0.12%	506,674	3.90%	3,162	0.02%	54,541	0.42%	451,285	3.47%	1,049,615	8.07%
Rhode Island	1,097,379	754,050	68.71%	55,386	5.05%	3,513	0.32%	38,367	3.50%	320	0.03%	11,392	1.04%	52,250	4.76%	182,101	16.59%
South Carolina	5,118,425	3,178,552	62.10%	1,269,031	24.79%	16,591	0.32%	89,394	1.75%	3,085	0.06%	19,354	0.38%	189,580	3.70%	352,838	6.89%
South Dakota	886,667	705,583	79.58%	17,441	1.97%	74,595	8.41%	13,332	1.50%	493	0.06%	2,050	0.23%	34,432	3.88%	38,741	4.37%
Tennessee	6,910,840	4,900,246	70.91%	1,083,772	15.68%	15,539	0.22%	134,302	1.94%	3,594	0.05%	23,977	0.35%	270,223	3.91%	479,187	6.93%
Texas	29,145,505	11,584,597	39.75%	3,444,712	11.82%	85,425	0.29%	1,561,518	5.36%	27,857	0.10%	113,584	0.39%	886,095	3.04%	11,441,717	39.26%
Utah	3,271,616	2,465,355	75.36%	37,192	1.14%	28,690	0.88%	78,618	2.40%	35,831	1.10%	12,566	0.38%	120,452	3.68%	492,912	15.07%
Vermont	643,077	573,201	89.13%	8,649	1.34%	1,986	0.31%	11,457	1.78%	170	0.03%	2,561	0.40%	29,549	4.59%	15,504	2.41%
Virginia	8,631,393	5,058,363	58.60%	1,578,090	18.28%	19,080	0.22%	610,612	7.07%	6,195	0.07%	45,394	0.53%	404,910	4.69%	908,749	10.53%
Washington	7,705,281	4,918,820	63.84%	296,170	3.84%	91,191	1.18%	723,062	9.38%	62,490	0.81%	43,221	0.56%	511,114	6.63%	1,059,213	13.75%
West Virginia	1,793,716	1,598,834	89.14%	64,749	3.61%	3,187	0.18%	14,903	0.83%	429	0.02%	4,652	0.26%	72,135	4.02%	34,827	1.94%
Wisconsin	5,893,718	4,634,018	78.63%	366,508	6.22%	48,384	0.82%	174,267	2.96%	1,892	0.03%	17,613	0.30%	203,746	3.46%	447,290	7.59%
Wyoming	576,851	469,664	81.42%	4,735	0.82%	11,781	2.04%	5,037	0.87%	489	0.08%	2,425	0.42%	23,674	4.10%	59,046	10.24%
American Samoa (NOTE: Hispanics are double-counted as they are included in both the racial and the Hispanic categories)	49,710	374	0.75%	24	0.05%	13	0.03%	2,878	5.79%	44,090	88.69%	139	0.28%	2,192	4.41%	406	0.82%
Guam (NOTE: Hispanics are double-counted as they are included in both the racial and the Hispanic categories)	153,836	10,491	6.82%	1,340	0.87%	214	0.14%	54,586	35.48%	70,809	46.03%	955	0.62%	15,441	10.04%	4,522	2.94%
Northern Mariana Islands (NOTE: Hispanics are double-counted as they are included in both the racial and the Hispanic categories)	47,329	1,015	2.14%	65	0.14%	12	0.03%	22,054	46.60%	20,665	43.66%	65	0.14%	3,453	7.30%	554	1.17%
Puerto Rico	3,285,874	24,548	0.75%	4,286	0.13%	312	0.01%	2,746	0.08%	91	0.00%	2,508	0.08%	2,340	0.07%	3,249,043	98.88%
United States Virgin Islands	87,146	11,036	12.66%	55,936	64.19%	371	0.43%	910	1.04%	51	0.06%	1,750	2.01%	2,349	2.70%	16,075	18.45%

== See also ==
- List of largest U.S. municipalities by race/ethnicity in 2020
