= Central Valley Wicca =

Wiccan group in Central Valley, California

- Abbreviation: CVW
- Type: Wicca
- Classification: British Traditional Wicca
- Governance: Priesthood
- Region: United States
- Origin: early 1960s Central Valley, California
- Members: Unknown

Central Valley Wicca, sometimes abbreviated as CVW, refers to a particular group of traditions within the Neopagan religion of Wicca which trace their roots to a group of Wiccan practitioners who brought their practice from England to the Central Valley of California at some point in the early 1960s. It is one branch of British Traditional Wicca, alongside Gardnerian and Alexandrian Wicca.

There are several theories about the origins of Central Valley Wicca, leading to a degree of debate among researchers. Some speculate that CVW is an early offshoot or even a precursor of Gardnerian Wicca, while others suggest that the CVW share a common ancestor with what later became Gardnerian Wicca. According to their original custom, an initiate of Central Valley Wicca was not told who their initiator's initiator was; therefore, the identity of the person who first brought Wicca to the Central Valley remains a mystery. What is known is that she had ties to England and had most likely lived there; she was either British or had close connection to a British subject prior to settling in California.

At that time, individual names for "traditions" of Wicca were not in use; they simply called themselves "Wicca." Today, however, the various branches of Wicca that descend from the Central Valley Wicca have developed into traditions in their own right, including Silver Crescent, Kingstone, Daoine Coire, Assembly of Wicca, and Majestic. Some of the offshoot traditions from CVW have blended in influences from other related Pagan paths, although most retain the core essence of CVW.

Central Valley Wicca shares basic beliefs with, and has similar ritual structures and practices to, other forms of British Traditional Wicca as they are practiced in England. However, their interpretation of some of the material is unique, and their lore is similar but not identical.
