= Samuel Barrett =

American linguist

Samuel Alfred Barrett (1879 in Conway, Alaska – 1965) was an anthropologist and linguist who studied Native American peoples.

== Education ==
Barrett received all three of his degrees from UC Berkeley—B.S. in 1905, M.S. in 1906, and a doctorate in Anthropology, Phonetics, and Ethno-geography 1908.

== Career ==
From 1903 to 1907, Barrett did fieldwork research in Pomo, Miwok, Maidu, Yokuts, Yuki, and Wintun communities. Barrett's system of naming the languages of the Pomoan group included seven names based on geographical terms: Northern Pomo, Northeastern Pomo, Southern Pomo, Eastern Pomo, Central Pomo, Southeastern Pomo, and Southwest Pomo (now more commonly referred to as Kashaya). This nomenclature has been criticized for suggesting that the various Pomoan languages are dialects of a single language, when they are in fact mutually unintelligible and therefore distinct languages. Following this research, from 1908 to 1909, Barrett worked as an ethnologist on the George G. Heye Expedition, conducting linguistic research with Chachi peoples.

Barrett became a Curator of Anthropology at the Milwaukee Public Museum in Milwaukee from 1909 to 1920. He then held the position of director at this institution until 1940. While working at the Milwaukee Public Museum, Barrett was sent on collecting trips. One of the first of these trips was to Northern Wisconsin where he collected materials from Ojibwe and Menominee communities. In 1911, Barrett collected materials for the museum from Hopi and, from 1914 to 1915, Barrett conducted a collecting trip in Alert Bay with Kwakwaka'wakw communities. In 1915, he conducted another collecting trip within Paiute and Washoe communities. In 1921, he traveled to Browning, Montana and collected materials for the Milwaukee Public Museum from Niitsitapi communities.

From 1953 to 1957, Barrett conducted ethnographic research with Hupa, Yurok, and Karuk peoples. This research was done in connection with Alfred Kroeber.

The final major work of his life was to produce a series of films about the peoples of Northern California such as the Pomo, particularly the Kashaya.

== Works ==
- Barett, Samuel Alfred (1917). The Washo Indians.
