= Active–stative alignment =

Type of morphosyntactic alignment

In linguistic typology, active–stative alignment (also split intransitive alignment or semantic alignment) is a type of morphosyntactic alignment in which the sole argument ("subject") of an intransitive clause (often symbolized as S) is sometimes marked in the same way as an agent of a transitive verb (that is, like a subject such as "I" or "she" in English) but other times in the same way as a direct object (such as "me" or "her" in English). Languages with active–stative alignment are often called active languages.

The case or agreement of the intransitive argument (S) depends on semantic or lexical criteria particular to each language. The criteria tend to be based on the degree of volition, or control over the verbal action exercised by the participant.

For example, if one tripped and fell, an active–stative language might require one to say the equivalent of "fell me." To say "I fell" would mean that the person had done it on purpose, such as taking a fall in boxing. Another possibility is empathy; for example, if someone's dog were run over by a car, one might say the equivalent of "died her." To say "she died" would imply that the person was not affected emotionally.

If the core arguments of a transitive clause are termed A (agent of a transitive verb) and P (patient of a transitive verb), active–stative languages are languages that align intransitive S as S = P/O∗∗ ("fell me") or S = A ("I fell"), depending on the criteria described above.

Active–stative languages contrast with accusative languages such as English that generally align S as S = A, and with ergative languages that generally align S as S = P/O; that is, there are two types of S in active-stative languages. In ergative languages, some types of O/P can similarly be O/P=A.

== Types ==
For most such languages, the case of the intransitive argument is lexically fixed for each verb, regardless of the actual degree of volition of the subject, but often corresponding to the most typical situation. For example, the argument of swim may always be treated like the transitive subject (agent-like), and the argument of sleep like the transitive direct object (patient-like). In Dakota, arguments of active verbs such as to run are marked like transitive agents, as in accusative languages, and arguments of inactive verbs such as to stand are marked like transitive objects, as in ergative languages. In such language, if the subject of a verb like run or swallow is defined as agentive, it will be always marked so even if the action of swallowing is involuntary. This subtype is sometimes known as split-S.

In other languages, the marking of the intransitive argument is decided by the speaker, based on semantic considerations. For any given intransitive verb, the speaker may choose whether to mark the argument as agentive or patientive. In some of these languages, agentive marking encodes a degree of volition or control over the action, with the patientive used as the default case; in others, patientive marking encodes a lack of volition or control, suffering from or being otherwise affected by the action, or sympathy on the part of the speaker, with the agentive used as the default case. These two subtypes (patientive-default and agentive-default) are sometimes known as fluid-S.

== Argument marking ==
If the language has morphological case, the arguments of a transitive verb are marked by using the agentive case for the subject and the patientive case for the object. The argument of an intransitive verb may be marked as either.

Languages lacking case inflections may indicate case by different word orders, verb agreement, using adpositions, etc. For example, the patientive argument might precede the verb, and the agentive argument might follow the verb.

Cross-linguistically, the agentive argument tends to be marked, and the patientive argument tends to be unmarked. That is, if one case is indicated by zero-inflection, it is often the patientive.

Additionally, active languages differ from ergative languages in how split case marking intersects with Silverstein's (1976) nominal hierarchy:

pronouns (1st>2nd>3rd person) > proper nouns > common nouns (human > animate > inanimate)

Specifically, ergative languages with split case marking are more likely to use ergative rather than accusative marking for NPs lower down the hierarchy (to the right), whereas active languages are more likely to use active marking for NPs higher up the hierarchy (to the left), like first and second person pronouns. Dixon states that "In active languages, if active marking applies to an NP type a, it applies to every NP type to the left of a on the nominal hierarchy."

== Terminology ==
Active languages are a relatively new field of study. Active morphosyntactic alignment used to be not recognized as such, and it was treated mostly as an interesting deviation from the standard alternatives (nominative–accusative and ergative–absolutive). Also, active languages are few and often show complications and special cases ("pure" active alignment is an ideal).

Thus, the terminology used is rather flexible. The morphosyntactic alignment of active languages is also termed active–stative alignment or semantic alignment. The terms agentive case and patientive case used above are sometimes replaced by the terms active and inactive.

== Occurrence ==
(†) = extinct language

=== South American languages ===
- Northern Jê languages (split-S in finite clauses, central and north-eastern Brazil), including:
  - Apinayé (Oliveira 2003)
  - Timbira language continuum (Castro Alves 2010)
- Tupi–Guarani languages (Brazil, Bolivia, French Guiana, Paraguay, Peru), including:
  - †Old Tupi and †Tupinambá (fluid-S)
  - Sirionó (eastern Bolivia)
  - Kamayurá (split-S, Brazil)
  - Guaraní (split-S, with a few verbs allowing fluid-S marking, Paraguay)
- Many Arawakan languages, including:
  - Waurá (split-S, spoken in Brazil)
  - Baniwa do Içana (fluid-S; upper Rio Negro, Brazil)
  - Lokono

=== Central America/Mesoamerican languages ===
- In Mexico: Chocho and Amuzgo are active languages of the split-S type, with some verbs showing fluid-S alignment; Chʼol exhibit active-stative alignment in the perfective, with fluid-S alignment for some verbs based on semantic context
- In Panama & Colombia: Chibchan language Ikan (split-S)

=== North American languages ===
- In the south and south-east US
  - Gulf languages
    - Muskogee (also known as Creek)
    - Hichiti
    - Koasati
    - Choctaw (fluid-S on verbs and accusative marking on nouns)
    - A subgroup of Muskogean languages such as Chickasaw (In South Central Oklahoma)
  - Euchee (Yuchi) (in northeastern Oklahoma, historically in Tennessee)
  - Tunica (†) (or Tonica) a language isolate
- In the central US
  - Siouan languages (including Proto-Siouan)
    - Omaha
    - Biloxi (†)
    - Ofo (†)
    - Osage
    - Winnebago
    - Crow (fluid-S)
    - Ioway (split-S)
    - Hidatsa
    - Dakota (split-S)
    - Ponca
    - Tutelo
    - Assiniboine
    - Mandan (split-S)
    - Lakhota (split-S)
- In the Great Plains (east of the Rocky Mountains in the United States and Canada)
  - Caddoan languages
    - Caddo
    - Wichita (ergative, accusative and S-split mixed type) (†)
    - Kitsai (also known as Kichai) (†)
    - Arikara (Split-S; also known as Ree)
    - Pawnee
- In Eastern North America
  - Iroquoian languages
    - Mohawk (Ontario, Quebec and northern New York)
    - Seneca (Split-S; Western New York and the Six Nations Reserve, Ontario)
    - Huron (called also as Wyandot, spoken in northeastern Oklahoma, Quebec)
    - Oneida (spoken in Six Nations Reserve, Ontario; central New York and around Green Bay, Wisconsin)
    - Onondaga (Split-S type, spoken in Six Nations Reserve, Ontario, and western New York)
    - Susquehannock (†)
    - Cayuga (spoken on Six Nations of the Grand River First Nation, Ontario, by around 100 people)
    - Tuscarora (southern Ontario, Tuscarora Reservation in northwestern New York, and eastern North Carolina)
    - Nottoway (Virginia) (†)
    - Cherokee (Oklahoma, North Carolina)
- Western North America (in Canada, Alaska, Southern Rocky Mountains, Pacific shore of the US including California)
  - Na-dene languages
    - Haida
    - Tlingit
    - Eyak († since 2008)
    - Slave
    - Chiracahua Apache
  - Pomoan languages
    - Eastern Pomo (fluid-S, Northern California)
    - Central Pomo
    - Northern Pomo
    - Southeastern Pomo
    - Kashaya

=== South and Southeast Asia ===
- Austronesian languages
  - Acehnese (spoken in Aceh, Indonesia and Perak, Malaysia) is of fluid-S type
  - Kuanua (spoken by the Tolai on the island of New Britain) is of a split-S type
  - many active languages of Central branch of this family are spoken in Eastern Indonesia
- Papuan languages: Yawa (Split-S)
- Tibeto-Burman languages: spoken Tibetan (fluid-S)

=== Caucasus ===
- Georgian (spoken in the Caucasian nation of Georgia): generally considered a split ergative language, but Alice Harris has claimed that it shows active alignment in some verb paradigms (namely, that the ergative marker appears to apply to active-intransitive verbs; also stative experiencers take a different case marking and agreement pattern). However, even that is complicated by the existence of apparently-inactive intransitive verbs taking such marking, such as the verb meaning 'to boil'. Other Kartvelian languages such Laz, Svan, and Old Georgian show similar systems, while the position of Mingrelian is more controversial.
- Northeast Caucasian languages: Tsova-Tush: according to Holisky (1987), there are 31 intransitive verbs for which the argument is always marked as patientive and refer to uncontrollable states ("be hungry", "tremble", etc.), and 78 intransitive verbs with an agentive argument ("walk", "talk", "think"). They form a split-S subset of the verbs. The rest of the verbs form a fluid-S system; for instance, a single verb root can be interpreted as "slip" when it is used with a patientive argument and as "slide" with an agentive argument.
- Tabasaran

=== Siberia ===
- Ket, a Yeniseian language (split-S)
- Yukaghir languages (fluid-S, based on focus and discourse-pragmatic factors)

=== Reconstructed proto-languages ===
According to Castro Alves (2010), a split-S alignment can be safely reconstructed for Proto-Northern Jê finite clauses. Clauses headed by a non-finite verb, on the contrary, would have been aligned ergatively in this reconstructed language.

The reconstructed Pre-Proto-Indo-European language, not to be confused with the Proto-Indo-European language, its direct descendant, shows many features known to correlate with active alignment like the animate vs. inanimate distinction, related to the distinction between active and inactive or stative verb arguments. Even in its descendant languages, there are traces of a morphological split between volitional and nonvolitional verbs, such as a pattern in verbs of perception and cognition where the argument takes an oblique case (called quirky subject), a relic of which can be seen in Middle English methinks or in the distinction between see vs. look or hear vs. listen. Other possible relics from a structure, in descendant languages of Indo-European, include conceptualization of possession and extensive use of particles.

== See also ==
- Ambitransitive verb
- Case
- Diathesis alternation
- Ergative–absolutive language
- Labile verb
- Morphosyntactic alignment
- Nominative–absolutive language (Marked nominative alignment)
- Nominative–accusative language
- Unaccusative verb
- Unergative verb
