= Cloverdale Rancheria of Pomo Indians of California =

Indian tribe in California, United States

Total population
- almost 500

Regions with significant populations
- United States (California)

Languages
- English, Pomoan languages

Related ethnic groups
- Pomo tribes

The Cloverdale Rancheria of Pomo Indians of California (Kashaya: pʰalaha) is a federally recognized tribe of Pomo Indians in California. The tribe is currently considered "landless", as they do not have any land that is in Federal Trust. In 2008 they acquired approximately 80 acres (32 ha) of property on the southern end of Cloverdale, California. The property is currently going through the Fee to Trust process to become the tribe's landbase.

== History ==
The Cloverdale Rancheria is a community of Pomo Indians, who are indigenous to the region that is now called Sonoma County in northern California. They traditionally spoke the Southern Pomo language. Basketry was integral to Pomo culture, and both men and women wove baskets. Annie Burke, the mother of one of the most celebrated Pomo basket weavers, Elsie Allen, was a Cloverdale Pomo and Elsie spent part of her childhood living on the Cloverdale Rancheria.

Russian fur traders were the first non-Indians to settle in Pomo land in the late 18th century. They established Fort Ross in 1812 and hunted sea otter. The gold rush of the mid-19th century brought an onslaught of European-Americans to the region, who disrupted tribal life and destroyed tribal lands.

In the early 20th century, the US government created a system of rancherias, or small reservations, for displaced Californian Indians. In 1921 the US recognized the Cloverdale Rancheria and deeded 27.5 acres (111,000 m^{2}) to the tribe; however, in 1953 the California Rancheria Act divided the reservation lands into individual allotments. The act also terminated relations between the US federal government and the Cloverdale Rancheria, as well as 43 other Californian tribes.

Tillie Hardwick (1924–1999), a Pomo woman, sued the United States in the 1979 over the California Rancheria Act and termination policy. In 1983 she won the lawsuit, paving the way for 17 California tribes to regain federal recognition, including the Cloverdale Rancheria.

In 1994, tribal landowners were forced by California Department of Transportation to sell their land for a U.S. Route 101 bypass. The freeway ran directly through the middle of the reservation, rendering much of it uninhabitable.

== Today ==
Despite challenges, the Cloverdale Rancheria remain committed to preserving and sustaining their traditional culture. In 2006 a traditional dance group formed to teach Pomo dances and to the youth.

The current, elected tribal leaders are:

- Patricia Hermosillo, Chairperson
- Silver Galleto, Vice Chairman
- Maria Elliott, Tribal Secretary
- Vickey Macias, Tribal Treasurer
- Sandra Roope, Tribal Representative.
