= Northern Pomo language =

Endangered Pomoan language of California

Northern Pomo
- hilt̪in jano
- Native to: United States
- Region: Northern California
- Ethnicity: Pomo
- Extinct: 2005
- Language family: Pomoan: Western; Northern Pomo
- Dialects: Mato; Mitom; Kacha; Masut; Balokay; Shodakay; Komli

Language codes
- ISO 639-3: pej
- Glottolog: nort2966
- ELP: Northern Pomo
- The seven Pomoan languages with an indication of their pre-contact distribution within California; Northern Pomo in brown

- Northern Pomo is classified as Critically Endangered by the UNESCO Atlas of the World's Languages in Danger.

Northern Pomo (autonym: hilt̪in jano) is a dormant Pomoan language, formerly spoken by the indigenous Pomo people in what is today California. The speakers of Northern Pomo were traditionally those who lived in the northern and largest area of the Pomoan territory. Other communities near to the Pomo were the Coast Yuki, the Huchnom, and the Athabascan. Ukiah High School first began offering Northern Pomo to students in Fall 2020.

== Classification ==
Northern Pomo falls under the Western branch of the Pomoan language family, and it is the only language categorized in this branch that is not part of the Southern group.

=== Related languages ===
There are seven different Pomoan languages:

- Northern Pomo
- Northeastern Pomo
- Eastern Pomo
- Central Pomo
- Southern Pomo
- Southeastern Pomo
- Kashaya (Southwestern) Pomo

While these languages are related, "Pomo" is roughly equivalent to "Germanic"—while there may be similarities, these are all clearly distinct languages that are not mutually intelligible.

== History ==
The earliest noted documentation of Native Americans in this area was by General Drake in 1579, but it cannot be certain that the people he encountered were what is now considered to be the Pomo. A census was delivered of the people in this area by Colonel Redick M'Kee during an expedition in 1851 putting the Pomo at roughly 1000–1200 people. The language was not documented during either encounter.

Later expeditions by John Wesley Powell in 1891 and Samuel Barrett in 1908 would record accounts of the language family and its branches.

== Geographic distribution ==
Northern Pomo was spoken in the United States of America in the northern coastal area of California. The Pomo inhabited a massive amount of territory north of the San Francisco Bay and surrounding Clear Lake in northern California, US. According to the 2010 United States Census, there are 10,308 Pomo people in the United States. Of these, 8,578 reside in California.

== Phonology ==
Consonants
			Bilabial	Dental	Alveolar	Postalveolar	Palatal	Velar	Glottal
Stop	Voiced		b		d				
Stop	Voiceless	Plain	p	t̪	t			k	ʔ
Stop	Voiceless	Aspirated	pʰ	t̪ʰ	tʰ			kʰ	
Stop	Voiceless	Ejective	pʼ	t̪ʼ	tʼ			kʼ	
Affricate		Plain			t͡s	t͡ʃ			
Affricate		Aspirated			t͡sʰ	t͡ʃʰ			
Affricate		Ejective			t͡sʼ	t͡ʃʼ			
Nasal			m		n				
Fricative					s	ʃ			h
Approximant			w		l		j		

Allophones of /kʰ, t͡sʼ/ include [x, sʼ].

Vowels
	Front		Central		Back	
	short	long	short	long	short	long
Close	i	iː			u	uː
Mid	e	eː			o	oː
Open			a	aː		

== Grammar ==
=== Relational terminology ===
Northern Pomo normally avoids the use of birth names in conversation, instead using relational terminology such as father, mother, sister, etc. This is especially present in the case of a deceased family member. The avoidance of names is why third person referencing is prevalent in Pomoan speech. If the deceased family member was close to the speaker, they will not speak their name even if a living relative shares that name. Any speaking partner is expected to avoid these names so that the speaker does not hear it. It is seen as a disrespect to their relationship with the deceased. More casual speakers may mention the names of the deceased in conversation that they are not related to.

=== Possessive terminology ===
Northern Pomo switches between regular possession and possessor raising depending upon the term the speaker wants to focus upon. In a regular possession situation, the subject of the sentence remains the focus, whereas with possessor raising the object or person being possessed becomes the focus of the sentence. Depending on which construction is used in Northern Pomo the implications of a given sentence would change. Sentences with possessor raising constructions imply consequences in Northern Pomo, such as the consequences of a possessor affecting a body part or having a certain physical trait.

== See also ==
- Pomoan languages
- Pomo people
