= Abraham M. Halpern =

American linguist and anthropologist (1914–1985)

- Born: February 20, 1914; Boston, Massachusetts, U.S.
- Died: October 20, 1985 (aged 71); Santa Fe, New Mexico, U.S.
- Education: Harvard College; Harvard University; University of California, Berkeley; University of Chicago
- Occupations: Linguist; anthropologist

Abraham "Abe" Meyer Halpern (February 20, 1914, Boston, Massachusetts – October 20, 1985, Santa Fe, New Mexico) was a linguist and anthropologist who specialized in Native American Languages. In the wake of World War II he initiated a second career focusing on United States foreign policy, especially in regard to China. Late in life he resumed studying and publishing on the languages of California.

== Early life and education ==
Halpern was born in Boston, where he attended Boston Latin School. He went on to receive his B.A. from Harvard College, and to do graduate research at Harvard, the University of California, Berkeley, and the University of Chicago.

== Work in linguistics ==
=== Quechan ===
At Berkeley Halpern studied under Alfred L. Kroeber. In 1935, in a project funded by the California State Emergency Relief Administration, he undertook to supervise the compilation of a dictionary of the Quechan language (also formerly known as Yuma) of southern California and Arizona. (However, the dictionary was not completed as the funding organization was dismantled and replaced by the Works Projects Administration.)

At this point, on the suggestion of Kroeber, Halpern transferred to the University of Chicago to study under Harry Hoijer. He would carry out extensive linguistic fieldwork on Quechan, resulting in his Ph.D. dissertation, the first published grammar of a Yuman language. He received his Ph.D. from the University of Chicago in 1947.

Kar?úk: Native Accounts of the Quechan Mourning Ceremony, a study of a traditional Quechan ceremony, was edited and published posthumously.

=== Pomoan ===
He first worked on the Pomoan languages of Northern California in 1936, and again in 1939 and 1940. Much later in life he returned to the study of the Pomoan languages: he made field recordings of three of the languages in the 1980s: Central, Southern, and Southeastern languages.

Among the speakers he worked with in the 1980s was Pomo basketweaver Elsie Allen.

== Work in international relations ==
Halpern became involved in the teaching of the Japanese language when he organized the teaching program in the Civil Affairs Training School in Chicago, together with his first wife Mary Fujii Halpern. This project became Halpern's entrée into the world of international relations, which became a second career. He went on to carry out work on international relations at several institutions, including the Carnegie Institution and the RAND Corporation, where he published extensively on China and Asia. Later he worked at the Council on Foreign Relations in New York.

He assumed the position previously held by linguist Robert King Hall at the Civil Information and Education Section of GHQ/SCAP in Japan, where he promoted the adoption of the phonemic Kunrei-Shiki style of romanization of Japanese (rōmaji), and supervised studies on the feasibility of widening the use of romanization in Japan.

== Archived work ==
Halpern's field recordings are archived at the Berkeley Language Center, and his documentary work is archived at the Survey of California and Other Indian Languages. His 1941 fieldnotes on the Potawatomi language are archived at the National Anthropological Archives in Suitland, Maryland.

== Personal life ==
Halpern married twice. His first wife was Mary Fujii, daughter of Rutaro Fujii and Katsu Yokobori Fujii of Hayward, California; she died in 1967. They had two sons, Alexander and Paul. His second wife was anthropologist Katherine Spencer Halpern; they married in 1968. Halpern died in 1985, aged 71 years, in Santa Fe, New Mexico.
