= Habematolel Pomo of Upper Lake =

Coordinates: 39°11′02″N 122°54′49″W

Total population
- 181

Regions with significant populations
- United States (California)

Languages
- English, Pomoan languages

Religion
- Roundhouse religion; Christianity; Kuksu

Related ethnic groups
- Pomo tribes

Location of Upper Lake Rancheria

The Habematolel Pomo of Upper Lake is a federally recognized tribe of Pomo Indians in Lake County, California. The tribe's reservation, the Upper Lake Rancheria, is 119 acres (0.48 km^{2}) large and located near the town of Upper Lake in northwestern California.

== History ==
The Habematolel Pomo are indigenous to California's Clear Lake Basin. Artifacts made by early Native Americans in the Clear Lake Basin have been carbon-dated to 8,000 years ago, although tribal occupation probably extends back further in time. By 6,000 years ago the entire lake was used by tribes evenly settled around the lake shore. By 1800, Pomo population in California was an estimated to be 10,000-18,000 people, belonging to 70 different Pomo tribes and speaking seven different Pomo languages. The Habematolel Pomo, were some of the estimated 350 Northern Pomo. The Habematolel Pomo belong to the Northern and Eastern Pomo language groups, both of which are considered today to be extinct.

Known for their extensive trade networks, the Habematolel Pomo traded magnesite and obsidian with the Coast Miwoks for a variety of shells. Pomo are known for their woven baskets and elaborate feather headdresses.

The Bloody Island Massacre or Bonopoti occurred in 1850, on "Old Island", at the north end of Clear Lake. The 1st Dragoons US Cavalry slaughtered almost 200 Pomos, mostly women and children of the Clear Lake Pomo and neighboring tribes.

In 1856, the Lake County Pomo were rounded up by the US military and forced to relocate onto the Nome Cult Indian Farm in Round Valley in northern Mendocino County. This later became the Round Valley Indian Reservation.

Faced with the onslaught on non-Indian settlers in their homelands, four Pomo groups, the Danoxa, Kaiyo-Matuku, Xowalek, and Yobotui, pooled their resources and purchased 90 acres (360,000 m^{2}) of land in 1878 at Xabematolel. This community was called Habematolel in Upper Lake. In 1907, the US federal government created the Upper Lake Rancheria for the tribe on adjacent land. The reservation grew to be 564 acres (2.28 km^{2}).

As part of its Termination and Relocation Policy in the interest of assimilating Natives into mainstream society, the US government passed the California Rancheria Act of 1953. This law enabled the US to terminate relationships with the Habematolel Pomo and break up the lands of the Upper Lake Rancheria into individual allotments.

The tribe responded with a lawsuit, Upper Lake Pomo Association v. James Watt, in 1975 saying that termination was an illegal policy. In 1980 the Bureau of Indian Affairs oversaw an election of a tribal council, who began drafting a new tribal constitution and bylaws. In 1983 the tribe won its federal court case and tribal recognition was restored in 1998, when a new council was elected. The current constitution was ratified in 2004.

== Today ==
The tribe is federally recognized and has nearly 300 enrolled members. The Habematolel Pomo operate their own housing, environmental, and educational programs, including computer classes and GED preparation. The tribe has been able to purchase land on its traditional territory, near the historical tribe village of Maiyi.

The Habematolel Pomo are governed by an elected, seven-member tribal council.

In 2012, the Tribe entered into the online consumer financial services industry after approving a regulatory ordinance and establishing a separate arm of the Tribal government to regulate its e-commerce entities.

Chairwoman Sherry Treppa testified before the House Financial Services Committee in 2016 on the Consumer Financial Protection Bureau's small-dollar lending rule and concerns about the Bureau's posture toward Tribal sovereignty.

In 2017, the Tribe's lending entities were sued by the Consumer Financial Protection Bureau. The Consumer Financial Protection Bureau dismissed the action in 2018.

== Land Acquisition ==
After reorganizing its government and ratifying its new constitution, the Habematolel Pomo of Upper Lake immediately set out to restore a portion of its original land base and eventually the Department of the Interior places 11.24 acres of land into a trust for the Tribe in 2008.

== Running Creek Casino ==
The Tribe began initiating the proceedings to develop a casino on its trust land by first negotiating a Tribal-State Compact with the state of California. On Memorial Day Weekend 2012, the Habematolel successfully opened Running Creek Casino, a full-service gaming destination in Upper Lake.

== Community impact ==
The Tribe has continued to make substantial investments in the Upper Lake community, benefiting education and public safety.

California Congressman Mike Thompson named Habematolel Pomo of Upper Lake's Sherry Treppa as Woman of the Year in 2023. He acknowledged the work she has done as tribal chair to advance programs that support the tribal community needs and the philanthropic work the Tribe does to support surrounding communities.

== Education ==
The tribe provides scholarships and housing opportunities for tribal member students in higher education.

== See also ==
- Pomo people
