= Split subject =

Split subject may refer to:

- Subject (philosophy)#Continental philosophy
- Splitting (psychology)
- Active–stative alignment or split-subject alignment
