= Agentive =

Agentive may refer to:

- An agentive suffix
- The agentive case
- A grammatical agent
