= Elsie Allen =

Native American Pomo basket weaver (1899–1990)

- Elsie Allen in 1975 in Covelo, California
- Born: Elsie Comanche Allen; September 22, 1899; California
- Died: December 31, 1990 (aged 91); California
- Education: Self-taught
- Known for: Basket weaving

Elsie Comanche Allen (September 22, 1899 – December 31, 1990) was a Native American Pomo basket weaver from the Cloverdale Rancheria of Pomo Indians of California in Northern California. She is notable for historically categorizing and teaching Californian Indian basket patterns and techniques, as well as for sustaining traditional Pomo basketry as an art form.

== Background ==
Elsie Comanche Allen was born on September 22, 1899, near Santa Rosa, California. Her parents, George and Annie Comanche (Comanche is an Anglicized version of the Pomo name Gomachu), were wage laborers who worked on farms owned by non-Native Americans, a job that was common for Pomo people in the early twentieth century. As a child, Allen was raised by her grandmother near the Pomo village of Cloverdale, located north of Lake Mendocino in northern California. At that time, she spoke only the Pomo language. After her father died in 1907 when she was eight, her mother remarried and moved the family to Hopland. Soon afterwards, at the age of ten, Allen began work as a farm field worker.

When she was 11 years old, Allen was taken 80 miles from her home by a government agent to an Indian boarding school in Covelo, California. The school enforced an English-only policy, leaving Allen unable to talk in her native Pomo language or follow instructions. She later informed that she was punished physically if she spoke Pomo. She endured additional unpleasant experiences and engaged in several activities that seemed meaningless to her, which contributed to her lack of motivation to learn. Consequently, she attended the boarding school for less than a year before deciding to transfer to a day school near Hopland, where she felt more comfortable. As she continued her education at the day school, Allen became proficient in English. Additionally, she contributed financially to her family by working in the fields while she attended school.

At 18, Allen moved to San Francisco seeking jobs outside of farm labor, eventually finding work in housekeeping and as a hospital worker. In 1919, she married Arthur Allen, who was a northern Pomo, and shortly thereafter, they returned to Hopland. Between 1920 and 1928, the couple had four children: Genevieve, Leonard, Dorothy, and George. During this time, Allen went back to working in the fields while raising her children.

== Activism ==
Through her involvement in civic groups, Allen became a strong advocate for the Pomo people. She participated in several Pomo and Hintil women's clubs, which aimed to promote education, advocate for Indigenous rights, and preserve cultural practices within their communities. These clubs offered scholarships, and Allen contributed to their funding by making and selling baskets.

In May 1942, eleven-year-old Marceline Allen, a Pomo girl, was ordered to move to a balcony section at the State Theater in Ukiah, California, solely because she was Native American. Marceline's mother filed a discrimination lawsuit, Marceline Allen vs. the State Theater, seeking $1,000 in damages. This lawsuit was financially supported by the Pomo Mothers Club, later renamed the Pomo Indian Women’s Club, in which Elsie Allen and her mother, Anne Burke, were active members. Eventually, the case was settled out of court, with the theater agreeing to pay a penalty and change its discriminatory practices. This victory compelled many local businesses to also end their blatant discrimination against Indian people.

In the 1970s, the US Army Corps of Engineers (USACE) planned the Warm Spring Dam and Lake Sonoma in Northern Sonoma County to reduce flooding on vineyard properties. The construction of the dam presented a serious threat to the cultural sites and ancestral villages of the Makahmo and Mahilakawna Pomo tribes, as well as to locations where materials like sedge, used in traditional basket-making, were gathered. In response, the Pomo people and non-Native residents formed a task force to legally oppose the project. Although construction continued, the lawsuit led to the reassessment of the cultural significance of the site. The Native American Advisory Committee for the Warm Springs Cultural Resources Study was formed to work with archaeologists, historians, linguists, and botanists to assess the cultural impact of the dam's construction. The committee, which included Allen and other prominent basket weavers such as Mabel McKay, Lucy Smith, and Laura Somersal, documented the history of the Makahmo and Mahilakawna Pomo. They focused on important cultural practices, such as local traditions and plant knowledge of elder weavers, and shared their findings with the USACE.

Although the Corps of Engineers proceeded with the dam construction, they agreed to transplant key plants essential to the Pomo people for their medicinal, economic, ceremonial, and artistic practices, including sedge and willow. Their decision was influenced by the study's results, and Allen's contributions played a crucial role in this outcome. Consequently, she and others successfully moved approximately 39,000 plants from areas that would be flooded to a nearby one-acre plot near the dam. Allen and the basket weaver, though, continued to gather sedge and willow from the Dry Creek Valley for their basket-making until the waters of Lake Sonoma submerged miles of traditional harvesting sites, as well as many of the area's prehistoric and historic Pomo sites.

In Allen's tribe, the position of chief was traditionally passed down within families to a son. However, in the absence of a son, a daughter would assume the role. A female chief has a particular responsibility for overseeing matters that specifically concern women. Although the last chief of Allen's Russian River Pomo tribe served in 1910, Allen continued this Pomo tradition of female leadership. She addressed issues affecting women and worked to improve the lives of her community and Native Americans across the United States while also preserving Pomo basket-making traditions. Due to her lifelong dedication, Allen became recognized as a cultural scholar, earning her the nickname "the Pomo Sage" and an honorary Doctor of Divinity degree.

== Basketry ==
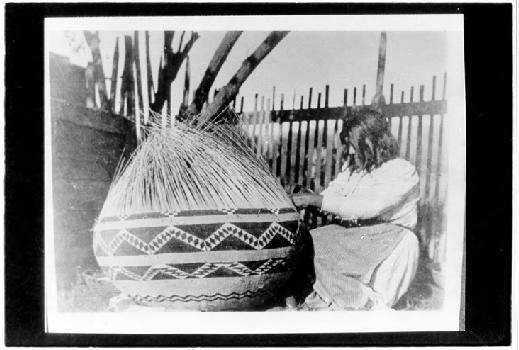
Allen's grandmother, Nellie Burke, weaving a 4-foot-high (1.2 m) basket in 1898

The Pomo people traditionally lived in the area around the Russian River in California, including Sonoma, Mendocino, and Lake counties. This area has an abundance of willows, sedges, and other plants that are traditionally used for basketweaving.

Pomo traditions held that a weaver's baskets were either burned or buried with her upon her death, or buried with a relative when they died. However, it also meant that with each death, valuable works of art and important teaching tools were lost forever. Allen came from a family of accomplished basketweavers, including her mother, Annie Ramon Gomachu Burke (1876–1962), and her maternal grandmother, Mary Arnold (1845–1925), both of Cloverdale Rancheria. As a child, Allen learned to gather plants for basket weaving by observing her mother and grandmother. When Mary Arnold died in 1924, her family followed tradition and buried her baskets and weaving materials with her. As a result, Allen lost those examples of weaving with her grandmother's death. With only a few examples left to study, she relied on her mother to help her continue learning the craft.

Anne Burke, Allen's mother, became skilled at basket weaving, creating beautiful, intricate designs on baskets she showcased at fairs across California. However, Burke noticed that knowledge of weaving was fading, and she concluded that if weavers' baskets were buried or burned, future generations would lack examples to study. In her later years, as her health worsened, Burke requested her daughter not to bury her baskets after her death. She wanted to preserve them for future generations to study and for non-Indians to see the Pomo people's skills, worried that the craft would be forgotten without physical examples. In honoring her mother's last wish, Allen went against tradition, and many of the Pomo community, including relatives, criticized her. Some urged her to follow tradition by allowing the baskets to "die with the people". Still, Allen remained committed to her mother's request and promised to keep the tradition alive.

Co-founded by Allen and her mother, along with other weavers, the Pomo Indian Women's Club provided a social and professional space for basket makers, operating from 1940 to 1957. The club advocated for its members by establishing fair prices for their baskets. Additionally, they organized exhibitions and demonstrations to educate the public about Pomo basketry culture and artistry.

After raising her children, Allen more fully dedicated herself to weaving and teaching Pomo basket making at the age of 62, following her mother's death in 1962. During the 1950s and 1960s, interest in basketry declined, including among the Pomo. In response, Allen began teaching the craft at the Mendocino Art Center to anyone who wanted to learn, regardless of whether they were Pomo or not. This decision, however, created controversy within her tribe. One of her last students was her niece, Susan Billy. With Billy, Allen felt she had found an apprentice who would carry on the basket weaving tradition and teach it to others.

Published in 1972, Elsie Allen wrote Pomo Basketmaking: A Supreme Art for the Weaver. In this work, Allen provides detailed explanations and photographs that describe the Pomo's basket-making techniques. She shares her life story and offers insights on how to gather materials and create various styles of baskets. Moreover, the book preserved Allen's techniques, serving as an instruction manual for future generations in the art of Pomo basket weaving.

== Southern Pomo language ==
Allen worked with linguist Abraham M. Halpern to document the Southern Pomo language.

== Legacy ==
Allen died on December 31, 1990, at the age of 91.

Together with Mabel McKay and Laura Somersal, Elsie Allen is regarded as one of the three best-known California basketweavers of her generation. Allen is the subject of several books, including Dot Brovarney, Susan Billy, and Suzanne Abel-Vidor's 2005 Remember Your Relations: Elsie Allen Baskets, Family, And Friends and Sandra J. Metzler's 1996 A promise kept: Basketry of the Pomo and the Elsie Allen basket collection.

Elsie Allen High School in Santa Rosa, California, is named for her.

== Published work ==
- Allen, Elsie. Pomo Basketmaking: A Supreme Art for the Weaver. Red. ed. Happy Camp, California: Naturegraph Publishers, Inc. (1972).

== See also ==
- Native American basket weavers
- Native American art
