= Eastern Pomo language =

Dormant Pomoan language

Eastern Pomo
- Clear Lake Pomo
- Bahtssal
- Native to: United States
- Region: Northern California
- Ethnicity: Eastern Pomo
- Revival: 2007
- Language family: Pomoan: Eastern Pomo
- Dialects: Upper Lake; Big Valley
- Writing system: Latin

Language codes
- ISO 639-3: peb
- Glottolog: east2545
- ELP: Eastern Pomo
- The seven Pomoan languages with an indication of their pre-contact distribution within California, including Eastern Pomo

- Eastern Pomo is classified as Extinct by the UNESCO Atlas of the World's Languages in Danger.

Eastern Pomo, also known as Clear Lake Pomo, is a dormant Pomoan language once spoken around Clear Lake in Lake County, California by one of the Pomo peoples.

It is not mutually intelligible with the other Pomoan languages. Before contact with Europeans, it was spoken along the northern and southern shores of Clear Lake to the north of San Francisco, and in the coast mountains west of Sacramento Valley. Eastern Pomo shared borders in the north with the Patwin and the Yuki languages, in the south with the Lake Wappo, the Wappo, the Southeastern Pomo, the Southern Pomo, the Central Pomo, the Northern Pomo, and the Lake Miwok. They also shared a border to the west with the Northern Pomo.

The southern and northern areas in which Eastern Pomo was spoken were geographically separate, and apparently represented differing dialects, split by certain lexical and phonological differences. Contemporary Eastern Pomo speakers refer to the north shore dialect area as Upper Lake, and the south shore dialect area as Big Valley.

== Usage ==
A documentation project for the language, which had not been written down, started in 2003 at the Big Valley Rancheria. The Habematolel Pomo of Upper Lake have been undertaking revitalization efforts based in part on archival materials held at the California Language Archive.

== Phonology ==
=== Vowels ===
Eastern Pomo has five vowels, which all occur both short and long. The vowels /i/, /e/, and /a/ are all unrounded vowels (respectively high, mid, and low), and the vowels /u/ and /o/ are rounded vowels (high and mid, respectively). In many linguistic descriptions of Eastern Pomo, Americanist phonetic notation is used, and a mid-dot represents long vowels: a· e· i· o· u·.

There are no occasions in Eastern Pomo where multiple vowels appear in sequence within the same syllable. There is one occasion where two vowels are in sequence across a syllable boundary, and that is in the word /tʃéː.al/, meaning 'toward where' or 'whither.' Also, vowels do not occur word-initially in Eastern Pomo.

	Short		Long	
	Front	Back	Front	Back
High	i	u	iː	uː
Mid	e	o	eː	oː
Low	a		aː	

=== Consonants ===
		Labial	Dental	Alveolar	Palatal	Velar	Uvular	Glottal
Plosive	plain	p	t̪	t̺	tʃ	k	q	
Plosive	aspirated	pʰ	t̪ʰ	t̺ʰ	tʃʰ	kʰ		
Plosive	ejective	pʼ	t̪ʼ	t̺ʼ	tʃʼ	kʼ	qʼ	ʔ
Plosive	voiced	b		d̺				
Affricate	voiceless			ts				
Affricate	aspirated			tsʰ				
Affricate	ejective			tsʼ				
Fricative	voiceless			s	ʃ	x		h
Fricative	trill			r				
Nasal	voiceless	m̥		n̥				
Nasal	voiced	m		n				
Semivowel	plain	w			j			
Semivowel	voiceless	w̥			ȷ̊			
Lateral	plain		l					
Lateral	voiceless		l̥					

Eastern Pomo has thirty-eight consonants. The voiceless plosives have a three-way distinction for each point of articulation: unaspirated (plain), aspirated, and ejective. The plosives also distinguish between lamino-dental and apico-alveolar points of articulation for each series, transcribed /t̪ t̪ʰ t̪ʼ/ and /t̺ t̺ʰ t̺ʼ/ respectively. /tʃ/ is pronounced as an affricate, [tʃ], in word-initial position, and as a voiceless palatal plosive, [c], in word-medial position. /ʃ/ is a laminal pre-palatal fricative, while /s/ represents [s̺], an apico-alveolar fricative, with a slightly retroflexed tongue tip. In linguistic publications using Americanist phonetic notation the alveolar plosive series is distinguished from the dental one with the addition of under-dots: ṭ ṭʰ ṭ’; the palatal consonants /tʃ tʃʰ tʃʼ ʃ/ are written č čʰ č’ š; the alveolar affricates /ts tsʰ tsʼ/ are written c cʰ c’; and the voiceless nasals, semivowels, and liquid are written using capital letters: M N W Y L.

There are a number of restrictions on the distribution of the various phonemes. /p/, /ts/, and /tʃ/ are relatively rare in Eastern Pomo. Voiceless unaspirated (plain) stops; voiced stops; voiceless nasals, semi-vowels, and voiceless /l̥/; and the fricative /h/ never occur in word-final position. /x/ never occurs before /i/, and very rarely before /e/ and /u/. /h/ only occurs at the beginning of syllables, and only occurs word-initially before /o/ and /u/ in words borrowed from Spanish. The voiceless nasals do not occur before the vowels /e/ and /o/.

The various pronunciations of the rhotic /r/ are complex. Syllable-finally, it as a voiced alveolar trill, [r], though word-finally, it has a fricative release. Word-medially, it is a voiced alveolar flap, [ɾ]. It is more frequently found initially in unstressed syllables than in stressed syllables, and occurs most commonly in syllable- and word-final position.

=== Syllable structure ===
The most common syllable structure used is a two-syllable form, CV:CV(:)(C)(C), with primary stress on the second syllable (where "C" represents a consonant, "V" represents a vowel, ":" represents vowel length, and items enclosed in parentheses indicate that the position is optionally filled). An example of this is /biːt̺ʼéːmkʰ/, "maggots to move around on something; many blackbirds to be in a field." In word-medial position, the syllable boundary falls before the final consonant in a sequence. For example, the structure [CV(:)(C)(C)(:)] is used for non-final syllables in words. Non-final syllables in words will end in C, CC, C:, or CC: only if another syllable beginning with a consonant follows. Word-final syllables can take the shape CV:CC.

The following words illustrate possible syllable shapes for words in Eastern Pomo:

- CV : /ká/ 'house'
- CV: : /káː/ 'for one to sit'
- CVC : /kál/ 'to the house'
- CV:C : /káːm/ 'stay, remain sitting!'
- CVCC : /dójkʼ/ 'several each to grind with mortar and pestle'
- CV:CC : /xéːlkʼ/ 'stretch'
- CV:CV : /muːká/ 'wild wheat, any grain'
- CV:CV: : /maːkáː/ 'look, search for something or someone'
- CV:CVCC : /maːt̺ʰinkʰ/ 'to massage, press certain part of body with feet'
- CV:CV:CC : /biːt̺ʼéːmkʰ/ 'maggots to move around on something; many blackbirds to be in a field'

Vowels do not occur in sequence (VV) within a syllable, nor across syllable boundaries. Sequences of two or more consonants within a syllable only occur at the end of a syllable, not initially. For example, /pʰorkʰ/, 'knock something (as acorns, fruit) off something (as tree)', shows a two consonant cluster in word-final position.

Across syllable boundaries in the middle of a word, it is common for there to be two-consonant sequences without restrictions, except that unaspirated stops, voiced stops, voiceless nasals, voiceless semi-vowels, and /h/ do not occur syllable-finally.

=== Stress ===
All roots carry primary stress. Most words begin with a two-syllable sequence of the sort, CV:CV (with primary stress on the V). The roots of polysyllabic words cannot always be isolated in this language, making it impossible to predict where the primary stress is going to fall solely on the type of morpheme. However, primary stress does occur on the second syllable of most words, including the words in which the roots cannot be isolated.

The weakest degree of stress falls on a syllable following a primarily or secondarily stressed syllable, and alternates on the following syllables. The syllables following the primarily stressed syllable alternates with every second syllable being slightly louder than the preceding unstressed syllable, but not as loud as the primarily or secondarily stressed syllable.

Secondary stress occurs when a word contains two or more primary stressed syllables, in which case all but one primary stress is reduced to secondary. There are exceptions in certain syllables that are always secondarily stressed, regardless of the alternating pattern of lightly and heavily stressed syllables following the primarily stressed syllable. This type of secondary stress is included as part of the morpheme. Suffixes that have this type of stress include /-kiːmà/ 'plural habitual', and /-bàja/ 'sentence connective'.

=== Phonological processes ===
Here are some examples of phonologically conditioned variation within the Eastern Pomo language involving one of the three processes: vowel harmony, consonant ablaut, or consonant and vowel deletion.

Vowel Harmony: This process affects the two high vowels, /u/ and /i/. The vowel /u/ lowers to become the mid vowel /o/ in instrumental prefixes. The vowel /i/ lowers to become the mid vowel /e/ if followed by /h/ or /ʔ/ and another /e/.

Consonant Ablaut: This process affects aspirated stops (plosives) except /t̺ʰ/, and the fricative /x/. When aspirated stops are in morpheme-final position, and are followed by a morpheme beginning with a vowel, the aspirated stops (other than /t̺ʰ/) deaspirate to become the corresponding unaspirated stops, and /x/ becomes /q/. For example, /xótʃʰ/, 'two', becomes /xótʃ-a/, 'two (things)'; and /kóːx/, 'to shoot' becomes /kóːq-a/, '(someone) shot something'.

Deletion: This process affects suffixes beginning with the vowels /i/ or /a/, or with the consonants /j/ or /l/:

- Vowel Deletion occurs when the morpheme before a suffix ends in a vowel, the suffix begins with /i/ or /a/, and the rest of the suffix does not consist only of this vowel. An example of this is the morpheme, {-aya}, indicating 'plural'.
- Consonant Deletion occurs in a similar situation, except instead of the vowel initializing the suffix, it is either /j/ or /l/, and the previous morpheme ends in a consonant. This can be seen in the morpheme, {-yiNàl}, indicating 'indirect object'.

== Morphology ==
The most important processes of Eastern Pomo morphology are suffixation and prefixation. There are half as many morphemes that serve as prefixes than suffixes. Other processes used are reduplication and compounding. The verbal or non-verbal function of a morphological unit is specified by the addition of inflectional suffixes, and/or syntactic relations. The inflectional suffixes fall into categories creating morphological classes; mainly, verbs, animates, substantives, and four minor classes, adverbial indefinites, locatives, directionals and directional preverbs. There are also uninflected words, which include proper names, interjections and syntactic particles.

=== Verbs ===
Verbs are morphologically the most complex and syntactically the most important. There are eight optional position classes of suffixes for verbs, specifying categories of aspect, mode, plurality, locality, reciprocity, source of information (evidentials), and forms of syntactic relations. Stems may be inflected as a verb by means of suffixation, prefixation and reduplication.

=== Animates ===
Animates have two subclasses, pronouns and kinship terms. They are inflected for subject, object, genitive, and comitative through the processes of suffixation and partial suppletion. Kinship terms distinguish between a person's own relative and another person's relative by means of suffixation and suppletion, and occur with two sets of possessive pronominal prefixes.

=== Substantives ===
Substantives have five subclasses, personal nouns, adjectives, nouns, demonstratives, and numerals. They are inflected for noun aspect. Nouns are inflected for possession and commutation, while personal nouns and adjectives are inflected for plurality through suffixation and suppletion.

=== Uninflected words ===
Uninflected words include proper nouns, interjections and syntactic particles. The basic morphological unit is the stem, which can be either common or unanalyzable.

Common stems have a root with the canonical shape CV’(:). The difference between common stems and unanalyzable stems is that commons stems can include an additional single position class of instrumental prefixes with the shape CV(·)-, and/or a member of one or both of two position classes of manner suffixes, with the shape -C, -CC, or /-ː/. A common stem is often used to apply to a variety of situations, which may not be formally associated in the typical English perspective. For example, si·qál, meaning both, 'pure, clean, all of one kind, homogeneous' and 'lick something like ice cream off fingers.' These two situations are distinguished through verbal and extra-linguistic context. And at the same time, a single event can be described by a variety of stems depending on what aspect of the act is in focus.

Unanalyzable stems consist of a longer sequence of phonemes than roots, such as CVC, or CVCV. Some of these unanalyzable stems are borrowed from Spanish, such as pášalʔ, 'to visit, a visit'.

=== Suffixes ===
Position Classes of Suffixes (Non-verb)

- I- Specifying: {-r}, {-·U}, {-yay}, {-l}
- II- Manner: {-n}
- III- Locative: {-w}, {-xa·m}, {-da}, {-a·ma·}, {-ya}, {-NA}
- IV- Directional: {-lal}
- V- Directional: {-ma}, {-wa}
- VI- Temporal Locative: {-Mi}, {-iday}
- VII- Number: {-i·nay}, {-aya}
- VIII: Deictic: {-ʔba·}
- IX: Syntactic: {-bax}, {-Mak’}, {-a}, {-al}, {-yiNàl}, {i·kò}, {-ba}, {-Nalal}, {-heʔè}, {-heʔ}

Position Classes of Suffixes (Verbs)

- I- {-kʰ}, {-k’}
- II- {-ma}, {-ʔwà·}, {-mli}
- III- {-qa}
- IV- {-ki}
- V- {-Mak’}
- VI- {-yaki}, {-kìl}, {-ki·mà}, {-baqay}
- VII- {-ayax}, {-ine}, {-baʔè}
- VIII (for dependent verb forming members)- {-iy}, {-qan}, {-in}, {-sa}, {-pʰi}, {-pʰila}, {-bàya}, {-iday}, {-ʔ}, {-Nalal}, {-ba}
- VIII (for independent verb forming members)- {-ya}, {-·hi}, {-·}, {-i·Nàʔ}, {-yaʔè·le}, {-iš}, {-è·}, {-ink’e}, {-·le}, {-baʔ}, {-im}, {-me}

An example of derivational suffixes are the gender suffixes, {-p’} for the masculine gender, and {-t’} for the feminine gender.

=== Instrumental prefixes ===
There are 18 frequently used instrumental prefixes in Eastern Pomo, which are used to indicate how something was done. An example of one of the frequent forms is {da} meaning 'with or affecting the hand'. It is seen in the word da·kʰó·, meaning 'grab at something, steady something with hand, catch with hand'.

=== Stem reduplication ===
Stem reduplication signifies different types of distributiveness, meaning that the action affects many individuals or creates many distributed results. There are four types in Eastern Pomo:

- reduplication of the root alone, {r}
- reduplication of the root plus a manner suffix, {ʔr}
- reduplication of an instrumental prefix plus a root, {R}
- reduplication of an instrumental prefix, root and manner suffix

It is clear that the reduplicated sequence comes after the base stem because the primary stress associated with all roots is not reduplicated in the process. The amount of distributiveness is determined by the number of morphemes involved in the reduplication. For example, in the first type of reduplication, only the root is copied, and only its meaning is affected. In the second type, the root and a manner suffix are reduplicated, and both of their meanings are affected.

For example, in the word mi·ṭʰi’ṭʰik’i·l, meaning 'kick something along, a little way at a time,' where only the root is reduplicated, it is possible that only one toe is used to do the kicking. The motion of spreading, as indicated in the phrase 'a little way at a time,' is the part that is distributed.

== Syntax ==
Word order is not fixed, but predictable, in the Eastern Pomo language. Verbs are the head of the clause, and typically the final word in that clause. Generally, the order preceding the verb begins with an optional adverbial or locative complement, then the subject, object, instrument, and possibly another adverbial or locative complement.

=== Case marking ===
The position of the agent is morphologically specified by one of the three suffixes: {-là·}, {-u·là·}, or {-yeʔèkʰ}.

- bu·ráqalu·là· wi qa·néa = bear-AGENT me bite = "I got bit by a bear"

The relation of instruments is marked by the suffix {-yay} when a morphologically marked subject and object are in the clause as well. The locative suffixes used to mark the locative complement are: {-w}, {-xa·m}, {-da}, {-a·ma·}, {-ya}, {-Na}, or {-iday}.

There is a syntactic relation of possession or dependency between the members of a phrase and the head of a phrase. Possession is marked morphologically by the genitive suffix {-bax} or a possessive pronoun:

- bó·bax ká·wkʰ = west-GENITIVE people = "people from Ukiah"

Dependency is not morphologically marked, but is interpreted through paraphrasing or dropping words.

=== Evidentials ===
Grammatical evidentiality is expressed by four evidential suffixes that are added to verbs: -ink’e (nonvisual sensory), -ine (inferential), -·le (hearsay), -ya (direct knowledge):

Evidential type	Example Verb	Gloss
nonvisual sensory	pʰa·békʰ-ink’e	"burned" [speaker felt the sensation]
inferential	pʰa·bék-ine	"must have burned" [speaker saw circumstantial evidence]
hearsay (reportative)	pʰa·békʰ-·le	"burned, they say" [speaker is reporting what was told]
direct knowledge	pʰa·bék-a	"burned" [speaker has direct evidence]

=== Switch-reference ===
Eastern Pomo, like the other Pomoan languages, exhibits a system of switch-reference, whereby suffixes are used to mark whether a clause has the same or a different subject from the preceding clause. The suffixes also mark temporal, causative, and other distinctions. The switch-reference suffixes of Eastern Pomo are given in the table below:

Meaning	Same Subject	Different Subject
Action of verb suffixed precedes in time that of main verb	-iy	-qan
Action of verb (1) explains, justifies that of main verb, (2) is simultaneous with that of main verb	-in	-sa^{1}
Action of suffixed verb is prior to and a prerequisite for the realization of the action expressed by the main verb	-pʰi	-pʰila
Action of main verb continues over same period or begins with time specified by suffixed verb	-bàya	-iday

^{1} Occurs only with meaning (1)

An example of one of the switch-reference markers in context is the sentence há· xá· qákkiqan, wi q’a·lál ṭá·la, "I took a bath, so [same subject] I got sick".

== Sample lexicon ==
- la·bi’tʰ 'flash on and off' : {la·-} (occurs only with this root, meaning unknown) + {bi’-} 'position, be positioned' + {-tʰ} (suffix characterizes intermittent actions)
- qa·léy 'eaten up, eat up' : {qa·-} 'with jaws and teeth, with jaw-like action' + {lé-} 'extend, with even, smooth distribution, and by extension, completely include' + {-y} (perfective suffix indicating an action that is completed or accomplished)
- xá ku·ṭʰi’ski· 'splash water (with side of palm)' : {xá} 'water' + {ku·-} 'with a flat surface, such as the palm' + {ṭʰi-} 'motion which spreads or extends' + {-s} 'suffix indicating concentration, intensity' + {-ki} 'semelfactive' + {-·} 'stative mode'
- ba·q’ál 'finish talking, going to school, or job of cutting fish or apricots'
- da·q’áṭ’ki· 'scratch off'
- da·q’á·s 'scratch with nails'

== See also ==
- Pomoan languages
- Pomo people

== Bibliography ==
- McLendon, Sally. (2003). Evidentials in Eastern Pomo with a Comparative Survey of the Category in other Pomoan Languages In A. Y. Aikhenvald & R. M. W. Dixon (Eds.), Studies in Evidentiality (pp. 101–129). Typological studies in language (Vol. 54). Amsterdam: John Benjamins Publishing Company. ISBN 90-272-2962-7; ISBN 1-58811-344-2.
- McLendon, Sally (1978). "Ergativity, Case, and Transitivity in Eastern Pomo". International Journal of American Linguistics. 44 (1): 1–9. doi:10.1086/465512. JSTOR 1264759. S2CID 145143075.
- McLendon, Sally (1975). A grammar of Eastern Pomo. University of California Press. ISBN 978-0-520-09369-0.
- Mithun, Marianne. (1999). The languages of Native North America. Cambridge: Cambridge University Press. ISBN 0-521-23228-7 (hbk); ISBN 0-521-29875-X.
