= Essie Pinola Parrish =

American Kashaya Pomo leaader, basketweaver and medicine woman (1902–1979)

- Born: Essie Nellie Fisk Pinola; 1902
- Died: 1979 (aged 76–77)
- Citizenship: Kashaya Pomo and American
- Known for: Basket weaving, Kashaya language studies
- Movement: Native American basketry
- Patrons: Robert F. Kennedy

Essie Pinola Parrish (1902–1979), was a Kashaya Pomo spiritual leader and exponent of Native America traditions. She was also a notable basket weaver.

== Biography ==
Essie Nellie Fisk Pinola (Pewoya in the Kashaya Pomo language) was born the fifth of nine children in 1902 to Emily Colder and John Pinola at the Haupt Ranch. Her Indian name was Pewoya (the Stirrer). She was raised by Rosie Jarvis, her maternal grandmother and a great tribal historian. At the age of 6, she was recognized as a shaman by the Kashaya and eventually became the spiritual leader of the Kashaya community. She was considered a prophet and a skilled interpreter of dreams. In 1920, she moved with her people to Stewarts Point Rancheria in Stewarts Point, California.

In 1943, upon the death of her predecessor Annie Jarvis, she became the official religious leader of the Kashaya people. As a religious leader, she became known as yomta to her tribe.

Parrish was also a healer and a teacher. Parrish educated Kashaya (Kashia) children in the Kashaya Pomo language.

Many anthropologists consulted Parrish on the Kashaya Pomo. She collaborated with Robert Oswalt, a linguist at University of California, Berkeley, to write a dictionary of Kashaya Pomo. Her work on Kashaya Pomo is in the California Language Archive. She helped create over 20 anthropological films documenting Pomo culture. Her film Chishkale on acorn preparation won the 1966 Western Heritage Award. She also made costumes for religious events.

Parrish's religious work is especially significant due to the assimilation of other Pomo communities at the time. While she emphasized the importance of going to school and integrating "into the white world to survive," she also forbad her tribe from intermingling, to avoid "losing their Indian blood line and of the chaos it might bring into their way of life," alcohol, and gambling. Parrish was also involved in local civic life, advocating for Sonoma county Indians through her testimony to the American government.

Parrish lectured with Mabel McKay at the New School in New York City in 1972.

Parrish was well known for her expertise in basket weaving. Robert F. Kennedy was among her collectors.

Parrish died in 1979. She is buried next to her husband and McKay.

== Personal life ==
Anne married Daniel Scott, with whom she had four surviving children. In 1928, she married Sidney Parrish and raised sixteen children. Her son Otis Parrish is a tribal elder and leader of the Kashaya Pomo people.

== See also ==
- List of Native American artists
- Visual arts by Indigenous peoples of the Americas
