= Katherine Spencer Halpern =

American anthropologist and educator (1913–2004)

- Born: August 7, 1913; Reading, Massachusetts, U.S.
- Died: March 9, 2004 (aged 90)
- Occupations: Anthropologist and educator
- Spouse: Abraham M. Halpern (1968-1985; his death)

Katherine Spencer Halpern (August 7, 1913 – March 9, 2004) was an American anthropologist and educator.

== Early life ==
Katherine Spencer was born in Reading, Massachusetts. She earned a bachelor's degree at Vassar College in 1935, and a master's degree at the University of Chicago in 1944, and completed doctoral studies at the University of Chicago in 1952 with a dissertation titled Mythology and Values: An Analysis of Navaho Chantway Myths.

== Career ==
In 1937, Spencer and two friends spent a summer doing research in Chaco Canyon in New Mexico. "I was overwhelmed by the Southwest," she recalled later. "Things just opened up for me." In 1940, she co-edited A Bibliography of Navaho Indians with Clyde Kluckhohn.

During and after World War II, Spencer did fieldwork in Alaska and worked in Washington, D.C. She was a social work professor at Boston University from 1954 to 1970. From 1970 to 1978, she was an anthropology professor at American University. She was a fellow of the American Anthropological Association. Halpern's research included studies of Navajo conceptions of disease and medicine, and of Navajo health care workers.

After retiring from American University, Halpern was a researcher at the Wheelwright Museum of the American Indian in Santa Fe, New Mexico, resulting in Reflection of Social Life in the Navaho Origin Myth (1983). She also contributed to the catalogue for the Wheelwright's show, Woven Holy People: Navajo Sandpainting Textiles from the Permanent Collection (1982). She wrote two biographies of anthropologists, Applied Anthropologist and Public Servant: The Life and Work of Philleo Nash (1983), and Washington Matthews: Studies of Navajo Culture, 1880-1894 (1997, co-edited with Susan Brown McGreevy).

== Personal life ==
In 1968, Spencer married fellow anthropologist Abraham M. Halpern, who was a widower with two sons. He died in 1985. She died in 2004, aged 90 years.
