= Kashia Band of Pomo Indians of the Stewarts Point Rancheria =

Coordinates: 38°39′24″N 123°20′20″W

wina·má· bakʰe yaʔ (Kashaya)
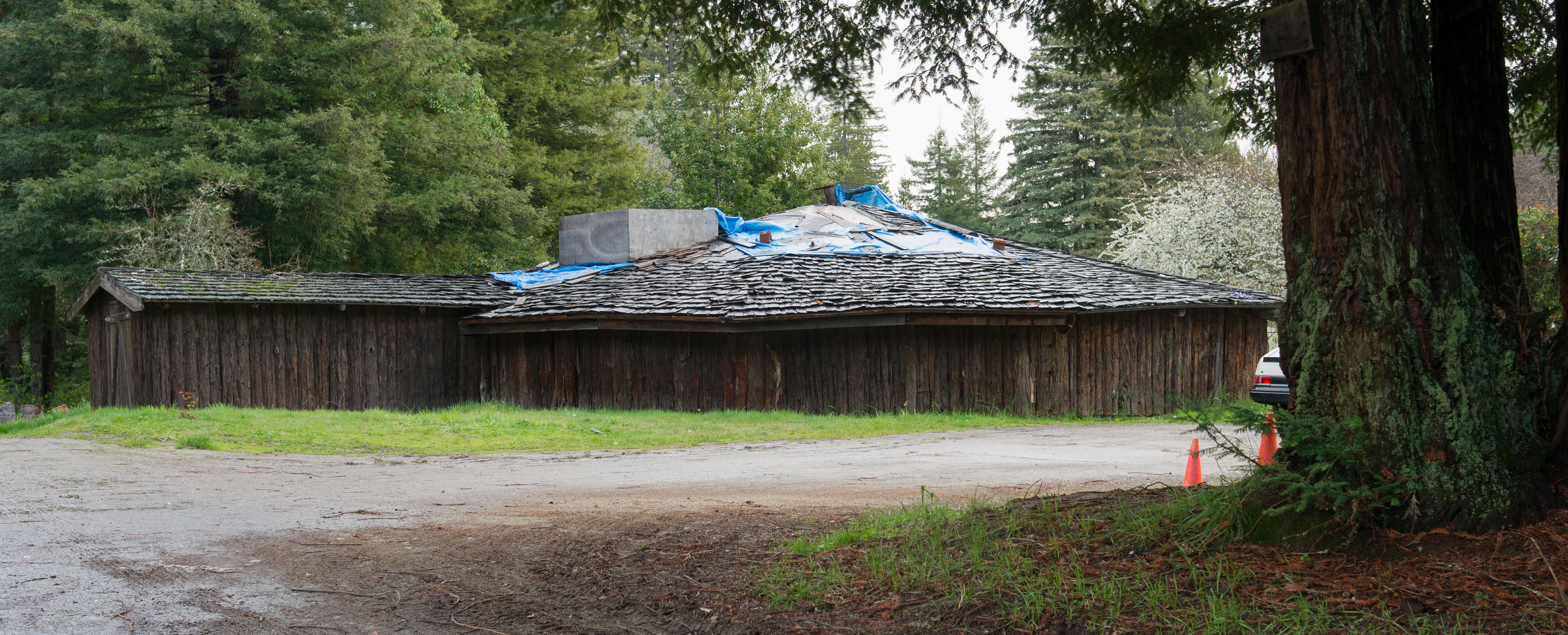
- Kashia Old Roundhouse in March 2012.

Total population
- 86+

Regions with significant populations
- United States (California)

Languages
- English, Kashaya Pomo

Religion
- Roundhouse religion, Christianity, Kuksu

Related ethnic groups
- Pomo tribes

The Kashia Band of Pomo Indians of the Stewarts Point Rancheria (Kashaya: wina·má· bakʰe yaʔ) is a federally recognized tribe of Pomo people in Sonoma County, California. They are also known as the Kashaya Pomo.

The reservation, Stewarts Point Rancheria (sʼuʔnúʔnu šinal), is located in Stewarts Point in northwest Sonoma County, south of Point Arena. As of 2010, 78 people live on Stewarts Point Rancheria.

Stewarts Point Rancheria sʼuʔnúʔnu šinal (Kashaya)
- Indian reservation
- Location of Stewarts Point Rancheria
- Country: United States
- State: California
- County: Sonoma
- Elevation: 13 ft (4 m)

Population (2010)
  - Total: 78
- Time zone: UTC-8 (PST)
  - Summer (DST): UTC-7 (PDT)
- ZIP code: 95480
- Area code: 707

== Reservation ==
The Kashia Band's reservation is the Stewarts Point Rancheria. It is located along Skaggs Springs Road in the Stewarts Point community in rural northern Sonoma County. It occupies 550 acres (2,200,000 m^{2}) in Sonoma County and 78 people live on it. According to the 2010 United States census 72 of the 78 residents are Native American, and an additional three residents consider themselves to be both Native American and of another race or ethnicity. The reservation has one elementary school, Kashia Elementary School, a community center with a tribal office and medical examination room and two ceremonial Round Houses.

The tribe conducts business from two offices, one in Santa Rosa and the other on the Stewarts Point Rancheria. The nearest outside community is Sea Ranch, which lies to the northwest along the Pacific coast.

== History and culture ==
The Kashaya still live in their ancestral homelands near present-day Fort Ross. Their name for themselves, wina·má· bakʰe yaʔ, is alternately translated as "Person who belongs on the land" or "People From the Top of the Land." The name "Kashaya" (kʼahša·ya) means "expert gamblers."

When Russians settled in Kashaya lands, they conscripted the tribe to work for them but did not break up the tribe or convert them to Christianity.

Gavin Newsom apologizes to California tribes, including the Kashia Band of Pomo Indians in 2019. Kashia representatives are interviewed in the video.

Essie Parrish (1902–1979) was an important Kashia Band basket weaver and a spiritual leader of the Kashia Tribe, she strove to sustain Pomo traditions throughout the 20th century. The current spiritual leader of the Kashaya Pomo is Lorin Smith, (born 1935). As a Kashaya Pomo elder and medicine man, Lorin has welcomed non-Indians to visit the round house and take part in the ceremonies.

== Demographics ==
Stewarts Point Rancheria has 78 residents. The reservation is 92.3% Native American, 2.3% white, 1.3% Asian, and 3.8% were two or more races. 14.1% of its residents are Hispanic or Latino (10.3% Mexican, 2.6% Puerto Rican). There are 20 housing units.

== Language ==
The tribe traditionally speaks the Kashaya language, also known as Southwestern Pomo. It belongs to the Pomoan language family of Northern California. Several dozen elders speak the language, and younger people are learning and trying to sustain it.

== Restoration of tribal land ==
In October 2015, California landowners Bill Richardson, Anna Richardson Granneman and Mary Richardson Zern sold the 688 acres (2.78 km^{2}) of land for several million dollars to The Trust for Public Land. The Trust for Public land established the Kashia coastal Reserve, which restored the Kashia Band of Pomo Indians of the Stewarts Point Rancheria access to the Pacific coast after they were forced to an inland reservation approximately 150 years earlier. Archer H Richardson had purchased the property, for $10 in gold coin on October 20, 1925, which features dense redwood forest, towering coastal bluffs, and waterfalls along the Pacific Coast Highway. The Tribe will manage the land as protected open space, and a demonstration forest will be maintained in order to educate and engage the public about the history and practices of indigenous people in the area. Additionally, the Kashia will permit the extension of the California Coastal Trail allowing for public access to their land. Funding for Kashia Coastal Reserve being acquired after five years of fundraising by the Sonoma County government, The Trust for Public Land, private foundations and groups.

== Education ==
The ranchería is served by the Kashia Elementary School District and Point Arena Joint Union High School District.
