= Southern Pomo language =

Pomoan languages of California, US

Southern Pomo
- Native to: United States
- Region: Northern California
- Extinct: 2014
- Revival: 2010s
- Language family: Pomoan: Western; Southern; Southern Pomo

Language codes
- ISO 639-3: peq
- Glottolog: sout2984
- ELP: Southern Pomo
- The seven Pomoan languages with an indication of their pre-contact distribution within California; Southern Pomo in purple

- Southern Pomo is classified as Critically Endangered by the UNESCO Atlas of the World's Languages in Danger.

Southern Pomo is one of seven mutually unintelligible Pomoan languages which were spoken by the Pomo people in Northern California along the Russian River and Clear Lake. The Pomo languages have been grouped together with other so-called Hokan languages. Southern Pomo is unique among the Pomo languages in preserving, perhaps, the greatest number of syllables inherited from Proto-Pomo (the proto-language from which all seven Pomo languages descend).

== Speakers ==
The speakers of Southern Pomo were never a unified political group; rather, they were spread across a number of villages and spoke slightly different dialects. Southern Pomo speakers did not have a name for their language or themselves. As the southernmost of the Pomo, the speakers of the language were the first to suffer the ravages of Spanish and, later, U.S. invasion. Southern Pomo speakers were used by the Spanish to construct the last of the California missions. The damage done during the Spanish colonial period was compounded by the United States control of California. Only the northernmost populations of Southern Pomo speakers, those of the Dry Creek and Cloverdale dialects, survived to be recorded by the time linguists began to collect data on the language.

At least four modern rancherias (the California term for small Indian reservations) include members whose ancestral language was Southern Pomo: Dry Creek, Cloverdale, Lytton and Graton. In 2012 there was one fluent speaker, from Dry Creek, one rememberer, and a handful of people who learned some vocabulary as children.

== Work on the language ==
A small amount of data was collected by early researchers such as Samuel Barrett; however, extensive work was not carried out until Abraham M. Halpern, in the 1940s, collected a number of Southern Pomo words and texts as part of a larger effort to collect data on all the Pomo languages. Halpern published one article, Southern Pomo h and ʔ and Their Reflexes, which dealt with aspects of Southern Pomo phonology. Halpern's unpublished notes are currently housed at the University of California, Berkeley. Robert L. Oswalt, who wrote a grammar of the related Kashaya (Southwestern Pomo) language, began to collect Southern Pomo data around 1963. Oswalt eventually published one glossed and translated text, Retribution for Mate-Stealing: A Southern Pomo Tale, as well as a number of other articles which included Southern Pomo data together with data from other Pomo languages. Though Oswalt did a large amount of work on a Southern Pomo dictionary, it has never been completed.

== Language revitalization efforts ==
In 2011 the Dry Creek Rancheria Band of Pomo Indians hired Dr. Neil Alexander Walker to develop a language restoration program for Southern Pomo, one that is currently active and includes classes, a mobile application, signage placed on ancestral lands and organizations, summer youth day camps focused on traditional Pomo foods, and aids such as posters and coloring books. As of 2012, fewer than three first-language speakers are known to survive, none younger than 90. There is currently a core group of heritage speakers from several tribes who are seriously involved in learning the language.

As of 2021 there are two Southern Pomo apps available, one called Learn Southern Pomo Alphabet and another one called Southern Pomo Language - Intro.

== Phonology ==
Southern Pomo has a rich sound system with aspirated, unaspirated, ejective and voiced stops. It has a total of 28 consonants (plus the pseudo-consonant /ː/). In contrast, there are only five vowels. All phonemes, both consonants and vowels, can occur long. The vowels and consonants are displayed in tables below.

=== Vowels ===
	Front	Back
High	i	u
Mid	e	o
Low	a	

=== Consonants ===
		Labial	Dental	Alveolar	Postalveolar	Palatal	Velar	Glottal
Plosive	unaspirated	p	t̪	t			k	ʔ
Plosive	aspirated	pʰ	t̪ʰ	tʰ			kʰ	
Plosive	ejective	pʼ	t̪ʼ	tʼ			kʼ	
Plosive	voiced	b		d				
Affricate	unaspirated			ts	tʃ			
Affricate	aspirated				tʃʰ			
Affricate	ejective			tsʼ	tʃʼ			
Fricative				s	ʃ			h
Nasal		m		n				
Semivowel		w				j	(w)	
Lateral				l				

== See also ==
- Elsie Allen
