= Mabel McKay =

Last Pomo dream doctor in California (1907–1993)

- Born: January 12, 1907; Nice, California, United States
- Died: May 31, 1993 (aged 86)
- Education: Spiritual training, self-taught
- Known for: Basket weaving

Mabel McKay (January 12, 1907 – May 31, 1993) was a member of the Long Valley Cache Creek Pomo Indians and was of Patwin descent. She was the last dreamer of the Pomo people and was renowned for her basket weaving. She sat on California's first Native American Heritage Commission.

== Life ==
McKay was born on January 12, 1907, in Nice in Lake County, California. Her father was Yonta Boone (Potter Valley Pomo) and her mother was Daisy Hansen (Lolsel Cache Creek Pomo). She was raised by her maternal grandmother, Sarah Taylor, who taught her the Long Valley Cache Creek language and how to forage for medicinal plants. At the age of eight, she was guided by her dreams to weave her first basket. She did not attend school past the third grade due to a series of illnesses.

=== Basket-weaving ===
McKay claimed that weaving, for her, was a spiritual path rather than a craft. She claimed she was strictly instructed by Spirit as to how and what to weave. Because of the sacred nature of her weaving, she usually wove in private. In keeping with Pomo tradition, she used sedge for her baskets and redbud for the red designs. Some of her baskets also used feathers.Her baskets were featured in many newspapers and she was viewed as a prodigy.

She began giving demonstrations in the State Indian Museum in Sacramento, where she refused to sell the baskets she made and instead gave them as gifts. In the late 1970s she began teaching basket-weaving classes for both native and non-native students. She continued with her baskets until death, and many have been exhibited in museums such as the National Museum of Natural History.

=== Academic and advisory work ===
In the late 1960s, McKay was on the Native American Advisory Council for a proposed dam in Dry Creek, which threatened to disturb an ancestral Pomo village site and long-standing beds of sedge. Although they could not prevent the dam's construction, the council was able to document the site and transplant some of the sedge beds. McKay also spoke at universities and served as a cultural consultant for anthropologists. She spoke at the New School in New York with Essie Parrish on March 14, 1972. In 1976 she was appointed to California's first Native American Heritage Commission.

=== Medicine ===
McKay also became a well known-healer among those in her community. She was one of the last Pomo dream doctors, and would often travel great distances to tend to her patients.

=== Personal life ===
Prior to the end of World War II, Mabel married Charlie McKay, with whom she had a son, Marshall (1952–2021). After Charlie died in the 1960s, McKay worked at an apple cannery.

=== Death ===
McKay died on May 31, 1993, and was buried next to Essie Parish in the Kashaya Pomo cemetery.

== Exhibits ==
From 2016 to 2017 the Autry Museum of the American West exhibited McKay's work in an exhibit titled "The Life and Work of Mabel McKay". Her son, Marshall McKay, helped put together the exhibit.

== Legacy ==
Greg Sarris published a biography of Mabel in 1997, called Weaving the Dream (University of California Press). McKay's work has been cited as having inspired other artists, including Dineh artist Leatrice Mikkelsen.

== See also ==
- Native American basket weavers
- Visual arts by indigenous peoples of the Americas
