= Dental and alveolar ejective stops =

Consonantal sounds represented by ⟨tʼ⟩ in IPA

Alveolar ejective stop

tʼ

Audio sample
- source · help

Encoding
- Entity (decimal): &#116;&#357;
- Unicode (hex): U+0074 U+0165
- X-SAMPA: t_>
Image

Dental ejective stop

t̪ʼ

Audio sample
- source · help

Encoding
- Entity (decimal): &#116;&#810;&#357;
- Unicode (hex): U+0074 U+032A U+0165
- X-SAMPA: t_d_>

Alveolar and dental ejective stops are consonantal sounds, usually described as voiceless, that are pronounced with a glottalic egressive airstream. In the International Phonetic Alphabet, ejectives are indicated with a "modifier letter apostrophe" ⟨ʼ⟩, as in this article. A reversed apostrophe is sometimes used to represent light aspiration, as in Armenian linguistics ⟨p‘ t‘ k‘⟩; this usage is obsolete in the IPA. In other transcription traditions, the apostrophe represents palatalization: ⟨pʼ⟩ = IPA ⟨pʲ⟩. In some Americanist traditions, an apostrophe indicates weak ejection and an exclamation mark strong ejection: ⟨k̓ , k!⟩. In the IPA, the distinction might be written ⟨kʼ, kʼʼ⟩, but it seems that no language distinguishes degrees of ejection.

In alphabets using the Latin script, an IPA-like apostrophe for ejective consonants is common. However, there are other conventions. In Hausa, the hooked letter ƙ is used for /kʼ/. In Zulu and Xhosa, whose ejection is variable between speakers, plain consonant letters are used: p t k ts tsh kr for /pʼ tʼ kʼ tsʼ tʃʼ kxʼ/. In some conventions for Haida and Hadza, double letters are used: tt kk qq ttl tts for /tʼ kʼ qʼ tɬʼ tsʼ/ (Haida) and zz jj dl gg for /tsʼ tʃʼ cʎ̥˔ʼ kxʼ/ (Hadza). In Oromo, one of the Ethopian languages that have this consonant, it is written with the letter x.

== Features ==
Features of an alveolar ejective stop:

- Its manner of articulation is occlusive, which means it is produced by obstructing airflow in the vocal tract. Since the consonant is also oral, with no nasal outlet, it is a plosive.
- There are four specific variants of [tʼ]:
  - Dental, which means it is articulated with either the tip or the blade of the tongue at the upper teeth, termed respectively apical and laminal.
  - Denti-alveolar, which means it is articulated with the blade of the tongue at the alveolar ridge, and the tip of the tongue behind upper teeth.
  - Alveolar, which means it is articulated with either the tip or the blade of the tongue at the alveolar ridge, termed respectively apical and laminal.
  - Postalveolar, which means it is articulated with either the tip or the blade of the tongue behind the alveolar ridge, termed respectively apical and laminal.
- Its phonation is voiceless, which means it is produced without vibrations of the vocal cords.
- It is an oral consonant, which means that air is not allowed to escape through the nose.
- It is a median consonant, which means it is produced by directing the airstream down the midline of the tongue, rather than to the sides.
- The airstream mechanism is ejective (glottalic egressive), which means the air is forced out by pumping the glottis upward.

== Occurrence ==
=== Dental or denti-alveolar ===
Language	Word	IPA	Meaning	Notes
Dahalo	[t̪ʼat̪t̪a]		'hair'	Laminal denti-alveolar, contrasts with alveolar ejective.
Eastern Pomo				Contrasts with apical ejective.
Trumai				Contrasts with alveolar ejective.
Wukchumni				Contrasts with retroflex ejective.

=== Alveolar ===
Language		Word	IPA	Meaning	Notes
Adyghe		ятӀэ / i͡atḣė / یاطە	[jaːtʼa]	'dirt'	
Amharic		ጥጃ/ṭəǧǧa/t'ejah/tehǧa	[tʼɨd͡ʒːa]	'calf'	
Armenian	Yerevan dialect	տասը/t'asë	[ˈtʼɑsə]	'ten'	Corresponds to tenuis [t⁼] in other Eastern dialects
Chechen		тӏай / thay / طای	[tʼəj]	'bridge'	
Dahalo		[t̺ʼirimalle]		'spider'	Apical, contrasts with laminal denti-alveolar ejective.
Ganza		[tʼóɗó]		'black'	
Georgian		ტიტა/t'it'a	[ˈtʼitʼä]	'tulip'	
Haida		qqayttas	[qʼajtʼas]	'basket'	
Kabardian		тӀы / ţə / طە	[tʼə]	'ram'	
Kawésqar		tǽrkse	[tʼǽɾkse]	'spicy'	
Khwarshi		тӀая/t'aja	[tʼaja]	'to drop'	
Lushootseed		t̕əbt̕əb	[tʼəb.tʼəb]	'winter wren'	
Mingrelian		ტყები/t'q'ɛbi	[ˈtʼqʼɛbi]	'leather'	
Navajo		yáʼátʼééh	[jáʔátʼɛ́ːh] or [jáʔátʼéːh]	'greetings' or 'hello'	literally 'it is good'
Nez Perce		tʼeyíitʼeyii	[tʼæˈjiːtʼæjiː]	'flat'	
Oromo		xarapheezzaa	[t'arap'ezza]	table	
Ossetian	Iron	стъалы/sthaly	[ˈstʼäɫɪ̈]	'star'	
Quechua		tʼanta	[tʼæntæ]	'bread'	
Svan		ტჷნ/tʼən	[tʼən]	'body'	

== See also ==
- Index of phonetics articles

== Notes ==
Place →	Labial					Coronal										Dorsal					Laryngeal			
Manner ↓	Bilabial		Labiodental		Linguolabial		Dental		Alveolar		Postalveolar		Retroflex		(Alveolo-)palatal		Velar		Uvular		Pharyngeal/epiglottal		Glottal	
Nasal	m̥	m	ɱ̊	ɱ		n̼	n̪̊	n̪	n̥	n	n̠̊	n̠	ɳ̊	ɳ	ɲ̊	ɲ	ŋ̊	ŋ	ɴ̥	ɴ				
Plosive	p	b	p̪	b̪	t̼	d̼	t̪	d̪	t	d			ʈ	ɖ	c	ɟ	k	ɡ	q	ɢ	ʡ		ʔ	
Sibilant affricate							t̪s̪	d̪z̪	ts	dz	t̠ʃ	d̠ʒ	tʂ	dʐ	tɕ	dʑ								
Non-sibilant affricate	pɸ	bβ	p̪f	b̪v			t̪θ	d̪ð	tɹ̝̊	dɹ̝	t̠ɹ̠̊˔	d̠ɹ̠˔			cç	ɟʝ	kx	ɡɣ	qχ	ɢʁ	ʡʜ	ʡʢ	ʔh	
Sibilant fricative							s̪	z̪	s	z	ʃ	ʒ	ʂ	ʐ	ɕ	ʑ								
Non-sibilant fricative	ɸ	β	f	v	θ̼	ð̼	θ	ð	θ̠	ð̠	ɹ̠̊˔	ɹ̠˔	ɻ̊˔	ɻ˔	ç	ʝ	x	ɣ	χ	ʁ	ħ	ʕ	h	ɦ
Approximant		β̞		ʋ				ð̞		ɹ		ɹ̠		ɻ		j		ɰ						˷
Tap/flap		ⱱ̟		ⱱ					ɾ̥	ɾ			ɽ̊	ɽ						ɢ̆		ʡ̆		
Trill	ʙ̥	ʙ							r̥	r		r̠	ɽ̊r̥	ɽr					ʀ̥	ʀ	ʜ	ʢ		
Lateral affricate									tɬ	dɮ			tꞎ	d𝼅	c𝼆	ɟʎ̝	k𝼄	ɡʟ̝						
Lateral fricative							ɬ̪		ɬ	ɮ			ꞎ	𝼅	𝼆	ʎ̝	𝼄	ʟ̝						
Lateral approximant								l̪	l̥	l		l̠	ɭ̊	ɭ	ʎ̥	ʎ	ʟ̥	ʟ		ʟ̠				
Lateral tap/flap									ɺ̥	ɺ			𝼈̊	𝼈		ʎ̆		ʟ̆						

		BL	LD	D	A	PA	RF	P	V	U
Implosive	Voiced	ɓ			ɗ		ᶑ	ʄ	ɠ	ʛ
Implosive	Voiceless	ɓ̥			ɗ̥		ᶑ̊	ʄ̊	ɠ̊	ʛ̥
Ejective	Stop	pʼ			tʼ		ʈʼ	cʼ	kʼ	qʼ
Ejective	Affricate		p̪fʼ	tθʼ	tsʼ	tʃʼ	tʂʼ	tɕʼ	kxʼ	qχʼ
Ejective	Fricative	ɸʼ	fʼ	θʼ	sʼ	ʃʼ	ʂʼ	ɕʼ	xʼ	χʼ
Ejective	Lateral affricate				tɬʼ			c𝼆ʼ	k𝼄ʼ	q𝼄ʼ
Ejective	Lateral fricative				ɬʼ					
Click (top: velar; bottom: uvular)	Tenuis	kʘ qʘ		kǀ qǀ	kǃ qǃ		k𝼊 q𝼊	kǂ qǂ		
Click (top: velar; bottom: uvular)	Voiced	ɡʘ ɢʘ		ɡǀ ɢǀ	ɡǃ ɢǃ		ɡ𝼊 ɢ𝼊	ɡǂ ɢǂ		
Click (top: velar; bottom: uvular)	Nasal	ŋʘ ɴʘ		ŋǀ ɴǀ	ŋǃ ɴǃ		ŋ𝼊 ɴ𝼊	ŋǂ ɴǂ	ʞ	
Click (top: velar; bottom: uvular)	Tenuis lateral				kǁ qǁ					
Click (top: velar; bottom: uvular)	Voiced lateral				ɡǁ ɢǁ					
Click (top: velar; bottom: uvular)	Nasal lateral				ŋǁ ɴǁ					
