= Northeastern Pomo language =

Extinct Pomoan language of California

Northeastern Pomo
- Salt Pomo
- Native to: United States
- Region: Northern California
- Extinct: 1961
- Language family: Pomoan: Northeastern Pomo

Language codes
- ISO 639-3: pef
- Glottolog: nort2967
- The seven Pomoan languages with an indication of their pre-contact distribution within California; Northeastern Pomo in pink

Northeastern Pomo, also known as Salt Pomo or Chhé'ee Fókaa ('salt people'), is a Pomoan language of Northern California. Descendants of Chhé'ee Fókaa speakers are members of the Chhé'ee Fókaa Band of Northeastern Pomo; There are no living fluent speakers, but several elders retain significant linguistic knowledge. It was spoken along Stony Creek, a tributary of the Sacramento River in the vicinity of Stonyford, California.

Chhé'ee Fókaa was one of seven mutually unintelligible Pomoan languages spoken in Northern California. Unlike the other six Pomoan languages (going to north to south: Northern Pomo, Central Pomo, Eastern Pomo, Southeastern Pomo, Kashaya Pomo, Southern Pomo), Chhé'ee Fókaa was not spoken in an area immediately contiguous with any other Pomoan-speaking territory. Chhé'ee Fókaa speakers were ringed by speakers of Yuki, Nomlaki, and Patwin; Yuki is unrelated to Pomoan or Nomlaki and Patwin, both of which are within the Wintu language family.

Phonology

Chhé'ee Fókaa has five vowel qualities, /i e a o u/, each of which may be long or short. Like other Pomoan languages, Chhé'ee Fókaa distinguishes voiced, voiceless unaspirated, ejective, and voiceless aspirated obstruents; it differs from most Pomoan languages in having a labial fricative <f> [ɸ], and a true series of retroflex obstruents <ṭ ṭ̓ ṭʰ> [ʈ͡ʂ ʈ͡ʂ’ ʈ͡ʂʰ]. Chhé'ee Fókaa also includes complex partial allophony for its voiceless lateral, which for some speakers could optionally be a retracted [ṣ] or a voiceless [r̥] and are presented in ( ) in the table of consonants below.

Chhé'ee Fókaa Consonants (Americanist symbols with IPA in [ ] where different)
place → manner↓	LABIAL	DENTAL	(POST) ALVEOLAR		PALATO-ALVEOLAR	PALATAL	VELAR	GLOTTAL
place → manner↓	LABIAL	DENTAL	CENTRAL	LATERAL	PALATO-ALVEOLAR	PALATAL	VELAR	GLOTTAL
PLOSIVE	p p̓ b	t̯ t̯̓ t̯ʰ	ṭ [ʈ͡ʂ] ṭ̓ [ʈ͡ʂ’] ṭʰ [ʈ͡ʂʰ] d [d]				k k̓ kʰ	ʔ
AFFRICATE				ƛ̓ [t͡ɬ’]	č [t͡ʃ] č̓ [t͡ʃ’] čʰ [t͡ʃʰ]			
FRICATIVE	f [ɸ]		(ṣ)	ł [ɬ]	š [ʃ]			
NASAL	m		n					
LIQUID			(r̥) r [ɾ]	l				
APPROXIMANT	w					y [j]		h

Grammar

Chhé'ee Fókaa grammar differs from its congeners in several ways. It shows only alienable possession on non-kinship terms, even for body parts (e.g. ʔawí: t̯ina: 1sg.POSS head 'my head'), whereas other Pomoan languages use inalienable possession for body parts. It also has nominative-accusative case marking unlike the agent-patient case marking systems of other Pomoan languages.
