= Southeastern Pomo language =

Endangered Pomoan language of California

Southeastern Pomo
- Native to: United States
- Region: Northern California
- Native speakers: 1 (2023)
- Language family: Pomoan: Southeastern Pomo

Language codes
- ISO 639-3: pom
- Glottolog: sout2982
- ELP: Southeastern Pomo
- The seven Pomoan languages with an indication of their pre-contact distribution within California; Southeastern Pomo in orange

Southeastern Pomo, also known by the dialect names Elem Pomo, Koi Nation Lower Lake Pomo and Sulfur Bank Pomo, is one of seven distinct languages comprising the Pomoan language family of Northern California. In the language's prime, Southeastern Pomo was spoken primarily in an area surrounding East Lake and Lower Lake, in Lake County, along the eastern coast of Clear Lake, in Northern California by the Pomo people. Southeastern Pomos inhabited an area on the northern bank of Cache Creek, and the Sulfur Bank Rancheria. Dialectal differences between the two sites of habitation seem to be minimal, and may be limited to a small number of lexical differences. Only one person, Loretta Kelsey, can speak the language as of 2023.

== Phonology ==
=== Vowels ===
Southeastern Pomo has six vowels, as depicted in the following table. Vowels that are inserted via epenthesis sometimes depend upon the adjacent consonants. Because of the variability of inserted vowels, they have been hypothesized to be excrescent. Southeastern Pomo is the only language in the Pomoan language family with only a marginal vowel length distinction.

| | Front | Central | Back |
|---|---|---|---|
| High (close) | i | | u |
| Mid | e | (ə) | o |
| Low (open) | a | | |

=== Consonants ===
The consonants in Southeastern Pomo are as laid out in the following table. Following Moshinsky (1974), at a systematic phonemic and abstract phonemic level, the parenthesized segments could be removed from the inventory. The voiced stop /d/ can in some cases be retroflex, as in the production of the word [x̣óḍoḍ] 'gopher snake'. The ejective stops of /k/ and /q/ are often distinguished by articulatory position.

| | | Labial | Dental | Alveolar | Palatal | Velar | Uvular | Glottal |
|---|---|---|---|---|---|---|---|---|
| Stop | voiceless | p | t [t̪] | ṭ [t̺] | c [t͡ʃ] | k | q | ʔ |
| Stop | ejective | pʼ | tʼ [t̪ʼ] | ṭʼ [t̺ʼ] | (cʼ) [t͡ʃʼ] | kʼ | qʼ | |
| Stop | voiced | b | | d [d̺] | | | | |
| Fricative | voiceless | f | | s | š [ʃ] | x | x̣ [χ] | h |
| Nasal | voiceless | m | | n | | (ŋ) | | |
| Tap | voiced | | | (ɾ) | | | | |
| Approximant | voiceless | w | | l | y [j] | | | |

=== Stress ===
Words are stressed on the first syllable. Although, in some cases a short epenthetic vowel is inserted to break up word-initial consonant clusters. Examples of these cases are:

- pílatu 'dish' from pláto
- kálawa 'nail' from clávo
- tíriku 'wheat' from trígo

In cases of loanwords, which are often borrowed from Spanish (similar to the examples above), the stress is changed from later stresses that are found in the Spanish language to an initial stress. Some examples of words that are borrowed from Spanish are as follows:

- sómlilu 'hat', from sombréro
- kúcala 'spoon' from cuchára
- ʔískina 'corner' from esquína

Primary stress is applied to the first stem vowel within the categories of noun and verb, this vowel is also often the first phonemic vowel in the word. Although there are two distinct exceptions to this rule: when a directional prefix comes before the vowel and in reduplication, when the vowel is the second occurrence in the stem.

==== Stress placement ====
Examples of this, as noted by Moshinsky (1974) are:

| /ca+qla+m+t/ 'it flew down to the ground' → cáqlamat | /cicala/ 'pea' → cícala | /qlacac/ 'woodpecker' → qəlácac |

=== Phonological processes ===
==== Sonorant syllabicization ====
In this phonological rule, /m/ and /l/ become syllabic when they precede a consonant which has the same point or articulation. Examples of this are as follows:

| /lde/ 'mountain lion' | /lṭa/ 'shoulder blade' | /mpu+k+t/ 'he whistles' | /mbo+l+k+t/ 'it exploded' |
| → ldé → ḷdé | → lṭá → ḷṭá | → mpú+k+t → ṃpú+k+t → ṃpú+ki+t → ṃpúkit | → mbó+l+k+t → ṃbó+l+k+t → ṃbó+l+ki+t → ṃbólkit |

==== D-deletion ====
This rule is as follows: d → ø / _ C

D-deletion occurs when it appears before a consonant, and Moshinsky (1974) has hypothesized that this may occur in order to eliminate two-consonant clusters when the first consonant is an alveolar stop or resonant. Some examples of d-deletion in Southeastern Pomo are:

| /lod+t/ 'my hair is falling out' | /bṭed+lay/ 'women' |
| → lód+t → ló+t → lót | → bṭéd+lay → bəṭéd+lay → biṭéd+lay → biṭé+lay → biṭélay |

==== Pretonic vowel epenthesis ====
This rule inserts a schwa between stem-initial consonants, preceding the stress vowel. This phonological process most often appears in the most difficult to articulate constant clusters, such as two stops.

| /blay/ 'blood' | /qbandu x̣le/ 'white oak tree' |
| → bláy → bəláy → buláy | →qbándu x̣lé →qəbándu x̣lé ~ qəbándu x̣əlé →qəbàndu x̣əlé |

==== Vowel lowering ====
This rule lowers /i/ and /u/ to /e/ and /o/, respectively. This lowering occurs morpheme-finally: /i/ lowering before /s/, /u/ before /cʹ/ and both /i/ and /u/ lowering before /l/.

| /ca+mlu+l+t/ 'he ran around' | /cʹi+mkʹu+cʹ+t/ 'those three are fighting each other' |
| → cá+mlu+l+t → cá+mlu+li+t →cá+mlo+li+t →cámlolit | → cʹí+mkʹu+cʹ+t → cʹí+mkʹu+cʹi+t → cʹí+mkʹo+cʹi+t →cʹímkʹocʹit |

==== Stop metathesis ====
This rule metathesizes the last two segments of the suffix -mkʹu- when it is directly preceded by a consonant.

| /pʹutʹ+mkʹu+t/ 'they kissed each other' | /mxex+mkʹu+tta+t/ 'the two of them swapped something' |
| → pʹútʹ+mkʹu+t → pʹútʹ+mukʹ+t → pʹútʹ+mukʹi+t →pʹútʹmukʹit | → mxéx+mkʹu+tta+t → mxéx+mukʹ+tta+t → mxéx+mukʹ+ta+t →mxéxmukʹtat |

== Morphology ==
=== Nouns ===
Noun morphology is significantly more limited than among verbs. However, there are still some cases of morphological rules.

==== Reduplication ====
There are some nouns that show reduplication. As noted by Moshinsky (1974), these nouns include derived verbs, and the semantic domains of small animals, plants and birds. Below are a few examples of nouns with reduplication in the Southeastern Pomo language:

- qwáqwà cà 'kitchen, cookhouse'
- qólqòl 'thunder'
- wówò 'grandfather'
- iméimè 'pneumonia'
- lúlù 'flute'

==== Pronouns ====
| Person: | Number: | Gender (in third person): | Position with relation to speaker: | Displacement: | Case: |
| wi- first ma- second third | singular -ay plural | -yi, -wi masculine -med feminine | mi-, me- near—this far—that | non-displaced displaced | subject -il object -itib benefactive -it+baq alienable possession -it inalienable possession |

=== Verbs ===
Verbs take a great variety of suffixes divided into many position classes. There are also instrumental prefixes that figure crucially in the use of many verb stems.

==== Position classes ====
Moshinsky (1974) identifies the following position classes; it can be seen that there is far more complexity in the set of suffixes than in the prefixes.

- Prefixes
  - A — Directional
  - B — Instrumental
- Root

| Reduplicative Morphemes: HAB habitual; INST intensive; DISTR distributed; ITCOM iter. to comp.; PLS plural source; PLF plural figure; ITER iterative | Suffix Position 1: -b- intensive change; -š- forceful contact; -pʹ- with force; -t- iterative; -y- plural figure | Suffix Position 2 Directionals: -mlu- circulative; -qla- downward; -qlo-~-ql- upward | Suffix Position 3: -mg- down towards a surface; -qc- causative; -qp- non-singular; -qx- to away from |
| Suffix Position 4: -mi- iterative; -n- figure separation | Suffix Position 5: -mkʹu- reciprocal; -w- plural action | Suffix Position 6: -ki- inceptive; -kp- plural figure, source; -ks- semelfactive | Suffix Position 7: -mp- plural source; -ćx- to away |
| Suffix Position 8: -cʹr- reflexive; -kp- plural figure, source | Suffix Position 9: -l- durative | Suffix Position 10: -cʹp- plural action; -qc- causative; -qp- non-singular; -ki- inceptive | Suffix Position 11: -x̣ot- negative |
| Suffix Position 12: -tta- dual | Suffix Position 13 MODE: -d- potential; -dey- about to; -mlaʔm- almost | Suffix Position 14: MODE: -a imperative; -da future conditional; -dowa hortative; -hine imperfect optative; -kʹli inabilitive; -wa impersonal agent / ASPECT: -kle habitual; -s negative imperfect; -t positive imperfect; -ya perfective | Deverbalizers: -baq past passive part.; -m instr. or place nom.; -n absolutive |
| Conjoining Elements: -btonwa after; -day simultaneous; -fed conditional; -fla sequential; -qat when; -yukinʹ before-switch reference; -miṭ identical subj. | Interrogatives: -ʔe interrogative; -ʔha yes no interrogative; -we locative interrogative | Evidentials: -do quotative; -qʹo introspective; -ya visual | Mode: -y perfective optative |

==== Reduplication ====
There are six verb affixes that are realized phonologically by reduplication, and they are as follows:

1. Habitual (HAB)
2. Intensive (INTS)
3. Iterative (ITER)
4. Iterative to Completion (ITCOM)
5. Plural source of motion (PLS)
6. Plural figure (PLF)

Many, but not all, verb stems that occur with reduplication can also occur without it. There are four reduplication rules for verbs (two of which are minor), that accompany the reduplicative morphemes in the above table.

Reduplication 1. Stem reduplication, (Directional Prefix) + (Instrumental Prefix) + Root → (DP)+(IP)+Root+(IP)+Root

- /b+la+ITCOM+k+t/ → bláblàtkit 'lap it up'

Reduplication 2. Directional prefix + -o-

- /qʹwo+ITCOM+t/ → qʹwóqʹwòt 'cough something up'

Reduplication 3. Stem-final Consonant Loss (minor rule)

- /ʔ+loy+HAB+l+t/ → ʔlóylòlit 'he skins an animal every day'

Reduplication 4. Root+Suffix (minor rule), Root+Suffix → Root+Suffix+Root+Suffix

- /ʔ+na+PLF+t/ → ʔnáʔnàt '1 ties 3 up'

==== Instrumental prefixes ====
Instrumental prefixes in Southeastern Pomo are significantly more limited than other Pomo languages. Moshinsky (1974) found that this is the result of a pre-Southeastern Pomo phonological rule which deleted an unstressed vowel that preceded the stressed root vowel, reducing in shape from CV- to C-. Because many of the prefixes are now rather similar, there is reduced analyzability of their meanings. The instrumental prefixes are as follows:

- ʔ- 'with the hand'
  - ʔbóʔkit 'pull a plant out of the ground'
- ʔ- 'action by natural forces, by gravity'
  - ʔəbétit 'destroy, run out of'
- ʔ- 'with one or more fingers or claws'
  - ʔlótit 'touch with the finger'
- b- 'with a protrusion; with the mouth, tongue, beak; talking, eating'
  - bqóyit 'to chop something into two pieces'
- b- 'handling a number of objects'
  - bʔélit 'gather food'
- c- 'with the front end, by flowing water'
  - cdót 'see'
- c- 'with a massive object, with a knife'
  - cqát 'he put it down'
- cʹ- 'momentaneous, intensive action, projecting from a surface'
  - cʹlétit 'it's dripping'
- f- 'with the end of a long object'
  - fádakʹit 'to dress a deer'
- f- 'with the side of a long object, piercing'
  - fqʹálit 'knock nuts off a tree'
- k- 'poking, piercing, pounding, squeezing, mashing'
  - kcát 'to kick'
- m- 'with a projection at the end of a long object; with the fingers, with the butt of the hand, with the foot'
  - mdútkit 'squeeze with the fingers'
- m- 'with internal energy; with heat, exploding, burning; with the emotions'
  - mhólkit 'wood turns to charcoals'
- m- 'with the projected end of an object'
  - mpúkit 'to whistle, blow a whistle'
- q- 'with a biting, scratching, tearing, mashing action'
  - qcékit 'to eat along with, in addition to'
- s- 'cutting, slicing, shearing'
  - sqóyit 'cut with scissors; saw off"
- s- 'with water'
  - swótkiqat 'dissolve'
- š- 'with a long, often flexible object'
  - šbút 'weave a basket'
- š- 'spreading out, stretching'
  - šmó 'foam'
- x̣- 'break, undo'
  - x̣lókit 'unwind, tear down, erase'

As noted by Sally McLendon (1973), most of the prefixes are cognate with prefixes in Pomoan languages. Among those that are not direct cognates with the prefixes in these other languages, they are highly related. An example of this with two languages in the Pomoan family is c- 'with the front end, by flowing water';, which is cognate with Kashaya /cû/ and may be related to Eastern Pomo /ku-/.

== Syntax ==
=== Word order ===
While Moshinsky (1974) notes that Southeastern Pomo has a somewhat free word order, and that sentences are often generated in the neutral order, Southeastern Pomo is a largely SOV language.

Some examples of this are as follows:

- cʹada wil da cix̣otkle. – 'No one bothered us.' (someone we not they.bothered)
- ʔà yìl syímya. – 'I borrowed it.' (I it borrowed)

Object-Verb sentences are also exemplified in the Moshinsky grammar:

- xa qlakmat, bxe cʹamat, xacʹit cʹamat. – 'We went fishing, deer hunting, mudhen hunting' (fish we.caught, deer we.hunted, mudhen we.hunted)

=== Case marking ===
Southeastern Pomo is classified as a nominative-accusative in nature. Some examples of this syntactic feature, as noted by Bernard Comrie are:

- hàyu wóʔwòʔkikle. – 'The dog barks.' (dog it.barks)
- ʔa tilodeyʔha. – 'Should I leave?' (I should.I.leave)
- cada wil da cʹix̣otkle. – 'No one bothered us.' (someone we not he.bothered)

=== Switch reference ===
Southeastern Pomo also has various switch references that come through in a number of sentences. The categories for each sentence type are outlined below with some examples of how they are used in Southeastern Pomo.

-fla 'sequential action', affixed to the verb of the first sentence

- ʔà x̣ólofla qnáḱya. – 'He fell asleep after I came.' (I after.I.came he.fell.asleep)
- yìwi yóqfla bxè ṭláqya. – 'After he shot it, the deer fell over.' (he after.he.shot the.deer fell.over)

-yukin 'sequential actions, different subjects', this suffix conjoins sentences with sequentially occurring events but that have different subjects

- ʔà x̣òloyukin tʹu qnákʹinya. – 'He fell asleep before I came.' (I before.I.came already I.saw.he.had.fallen.asleep
- mà móćkiyukin ʔà tílodit. – 'I'll go before you wake up.' (you before.you.wake.up I'll.go)

-day 'simultaneous actions', this suffix conjoins sentences in which the actions are occurring simultaneously, and can include either the same or different subjects

- x̣ólblòt cale ʔà btékit wàlday. – 'It happened when I was grown up.' (it.happened I was.grown.up when)
- yìwi ʔà scàday smán qʹlàlya. – 'He fell asleep while I was there.' (he I when.I.was.there sleep got.him)
- ʔa wìt x̣bàc̕day x̣ólodit. – 'I come when he asks me.' (I me when.he.asks I'll.come)

-fed 'conditional', conjoins two sentences, when the second of which is conditional upon the first

- ʔ'uyi wi yukin x̣ólofedmiṭ, dàwa da fdíkix̣otdit. – 'If he gets there before me, he won't know the road.' (he me before if.he.comes road not he.won't.know)
- ʔa bdékfed wiyaq kàcuce cáqdit. – 'If I throw, my cap will fall.' (I if.I.throw my cap will.fall)
- ʔòmlay ʔuyil ʔqóyfed ʔa mqódit. – 'If they ever head him off, I'll see it.' (they him if.they.head.him.off I will.see)

-qat 'contingent actions', this suffix conjoins two sentences in which the actions occur either simultaneously or sequentially, and can be used when the subject is the same or differs between the sentences

- málot ke lèluša x̣óloqat. – 'When he came to Leluša, he landed.' (he.landed and Leluša when.he.came)
- ʔòmlay mqóx̣qatmiṭ hàyu wóʔwòʔkikle. – 'When they holler, the dog barks.' (they when.they.holler the.dog barks)

-miṭ 'contingent actions, same subject', conjoins two sentences with the same subject in which the actions are connected or simultaneous

- ʔòmlay tʹátʹtʹàbkicʹitmiṭ qéykiqèykimkle. – 'Whenever they play, they laugh.' (they when.they.play they.laugh)
- mà cʹìnakʹotay qʹówlimiṭ qʹlálimiṭ mà cʹìnaḱotay qʹnìlki tìlodit. – 'If you do bad things, when you die you will go to a bad place.' (you bad when.you.do when.you.die you bad towards will.go)
