= Pomoan languages =

Language family of California, US

Pomoan
- Pomo
- Geographic distribution: California
- Ethnicity: Pomo people
- Linguistic classification: Hokan ?: Pomoan
- Subdivisions: †Northeastern; †Eastern; Southeastern; Western

Language codes
- Glottolog: pomo1273
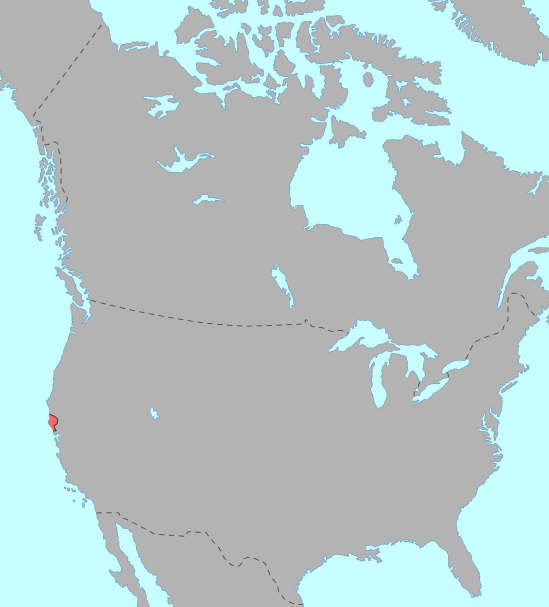
- Pre-contact distribution of Pomoan languages

The Pomoan or Pomo /ˈpoʊmoʊ/ languages are a small family of seven languages indigenous to northern California spoken by the Pomo people, whose ancestors lived in the valley of the Russian River and the Clear Lake basin. The majority of the Pomoan languages are extinct, and only Kashaya has more than ten speakers.

== Geographical distribution ==
John Wesley Powell, who was the first to define the extent of the family, noted that its boundaries were the Pacific Ocean to the west, Wintuan territory in the Sacramento Valley to the east, the head of the Russian River to the north, and Bodega Head and present-day Santa Rosa to the south (Powell 1891:87-88). Only Northeastern Pomo was not contiguous with the other Pomoan languages, being separated by an intervening region of Wintuan speakers.

== Internal relationships of languages ==
The seven Pomoan languages with an indication of their pre-contact distribution within California. Of the current speakers of these languages, many live within the same areas.

Pomoan is a family of seven languages. Their relationship to one another was first formally recognized by John Wesley Powell, who proposed that they be called the "Kulanapan Family" (Powell 1891). Like many of Powell's obscure nomenclatural proposals, particularly for California languages, "Kulanapan" was ignored. In its place, Pomo, the term used by Indians and Whites alike for Northern Pomo, was arbitrarily extended to include the rest of the family.

All seven languages were first systematically identified as Pomo by Samuel Barrett (1908). To avoid complications, Barrett named each of the Pomoan languages according to its geographic position ("Northern Pomo," "Southeastern Pomo," etc.) This naming convention quickly gained wide acceptance and is still in general use, except for the substitution of "Kashaya" for Barrett's "Southwestern Pomo". Barrett's geographical language names often lead those unfamiliar with the Pomoan languages to the misconception that they are dialects of a single "Pomo" language.

Various genetic subgroupings of the family have been proposed, although the general outlines have remained fairly consistent. The current consensus view (cf. Mithun 1999) favors the tree presented in Oswalt (1964), shown below.

- Pomoan
  - Southeastern Pomo
  - Eastern Pomo †
  - Northeastern Pomo †
  - Western
    - Northern Pomo †
    - Southern
      - Central Pomo †
      - Southern Pomo †
      - Kashaya (Southwestern Pomo)

The current consensus view of the internal relationships of the Pomoan family, based on Oswalt (1964)

Essentially identical versions of this classifications are presented in Oswalt and McLendon's "Introduction" to the Pomo chapters in Heizer, ed. (1978) and in Campbell (1997). The most important dissenter was Abraham M. Halpern, one of the few linguists since Barrett's time to collect comparative data on all of the Pomoan languages.

Halpern's classification differed from Oswalt's mainly in the placement of Northeastern Pomo. Instead of considering it an independent branch of the family, Halpern grouped it with the languages of Oswalt's "Western" branch. He suggested the possibility that Northeastern Pomo represents a recent migration of a Northern Pomo subgroup (Halpern 1964; Golla 2011:106-7).

== Proto-language ==
Proto-Pomo
- Reconstruction of: Pomoan languages

Proto-Pomo reconstructions by McLendon (1973):

Proto-Pomo reconstructions by McLendon (1973)

gloss	Proto-Pomo
acorn	*biʔdú
afraid, to be	*kʰiˑyá, *kʰiyáˑ
angelica	*baʔk̓ówa
arm	*ʔiˑxál(ʸ)
armpit	*daˑyamá-
arrow	*hic̓úˑ
arrow	*baṭʰíy
ashes	*hiˑnó(x̣ò)
back	*bak̓oˑ
backbone	*hiʔk̓i, *k̓idí
bark (of tree)	*qʰahwálʸ
basket, sp.	*c̓óˑy
basket, sp.	*kʰiṭúˑ
basket, pack (open-woven)	*buhqʰál
basket, pack (close-woven)	*buhkí ?
basket, pounding	*miké
bear	*buˑṭáqa(lʸ)
bear, brown	*limá(ˑ) ?
bee	*koʔó(lʸ), *kaʔolʸó
behind, rear	*siˑlí, *silíˑ
belly	*ʔuhqʰá(ˑ)
below	*ʔiyów
big, sg.	*bahṭʰé, *bahṭʰén
big, pl.	*ʔahṭʰíy, *ʔahṭíynʸ
bird	*c̓iyíta ~ *c̓ihtá
bite, to	*qaˑné-
blackfish	*xaqʰál
blanket	*ʔihxí(ˑ)
blood	*baˑláy
body	*xiʔbá
bone	*ʔihyá(ˑ)
bow	*xihmúy, *xi(ʔ)mi
brains, head, protuberance	*hoʔt̓ó
bread, acorn	*qʰaṭó(ˑ)
break wind	*ʔihpʰéṭ-
breast, milk	*xiʔdónʸ
brother, mother's	*cúˑ-c̓i ~ *céˑ-c̓i
brother, older	*méqi
brother, father's younger	*kéqi
brother-in-law (i.e., wife's brother ?)	*mahá-, *háˑ
buckeye	*bahxá
buckeye nuts when soaked	*dihsá
bumblebee	*kʰeˑhéy
burn	*maˑlí- ~ *mahlá-
bush, sp.	*qȧ(h)nóˑ
buzzard	*kuhkʰí
carry in hands, to	*bi-ʔdíˑ-d(i)-
causative	*-hqa
chaparral	*seʔé
chest	*yeʔélʸ
child	*qaˑwí
clam	*x̣alá/ú
claw	*héˑc̓
cloud	*qʰaʔbá(ˑ), *qʰaʔbú
clover	*ʔohsó
cold	*qahcíl, *qacˑi
come, to	*(h)wáˑdu-
cook, bake under ashes, to	*ʔihpʰá-
cottontail (rabbit)	*nóˑmik
cottonwood	*qaxálabʔ ~ *qáxalabʔ
coyote	*doˑwí
creek	*biʔdá
dance/song	*qʰé
daughter-in-law	*-ʔódʔ
daughter-in-law	*xowmi(ˑ-c̓i)
dawn, morning	*qʰaʔˑá
day	*makílʸ, *maˑkí
deer/meat	*bihxé
die, to	*q̓alálʸ ~ *q̓alá-
directional	*-lal
dirty	*c̓áʔc̓a
doe	*maṭʰéy
door	*hohwá
dove	*maˑyú, *maˑyúˑ
dream, to	*qʰaʔadˑú-
drink, to	*hoʔq̓ó(k)
duck	*q̓aˑyán (~ *q̓ayáˑn ?)
durative	*-kid-
ear	*xiˑmánʸ
earth	*ʔa(h)máṭ
east	*ʔaxóˑ
eat, chew, to	*qawá-
eat, to	*kuhˑú-
egg	*hik̓óˑ, *hik̓ó
elbow	*q̓o/uhsá
embers, charcoal	*mahsíkʔ/tʔ
enemy	*kuhmá
excrement	*ʔahpʰá
eye, face	*huʔúy
fat	*ʔihpʰúy
father	*meʔˑé
father, father's	*bá-ˑc̓i
father, mother's	*-ká-ˑc̓i
fawn	*nuhwákʔ
feather, small/down	*ʔahṭʰé ~ *ʔahṭʰén ?
feather, large	*hiʔˑí
fire	*ʔohx̣ó
first person singular subject	*haʔáˑ
first person singular object	*ʔawí-toˑ
first person singular possessive prefix	*ʔawí-
first personal plural subject	*awá-ya
first personal plural object	*ʔawá-ya-l
fish	*ʔahxá
five	*ṭuhxo
flea	*ʔiˑméla
flesh	*c̓iʔˑí
flint	*qʰahká
fly, to (1)	*hakˑá- ( ?)
fly, to (2)	*pʰudí-
fly, n.	*c̓amolʸ
food	*maʔá
foot	*qʰaˑmánʸ
forehead	*diˑlé
forest, deep, dense (hence shaded)	*xiˑyó
fox (1)	*haq̓áw
fox (2)	*duˑcá
frog	*waˑṭakʔ/qʔ
give round object	*dihqá-
go, several to	*pʰilá
good	*q̓oʔdí
goose	*lála, *hláˑla
gopher ?	*ʔaˑláme
grain, grain plant	*muhká
grass	*qac̓ˑá
grasshopper	*xahqót
hair, of head	*heʔˑé, *heʔey( ?)
hair, of body, fur	*cihmé ~ *ciˑme
hand	*ʔatʰáˑna ~ *ʔatʰaná
hawk	*k̓iyáˑ
head	*kináˑlʸ, *xináˑ/lʸ, *kʰináˑ ?
hear, to	*xóˑki-
hemp	*mahxá
hole	*hiˑmó
horn	*haʔˑá
hot, to be	*muht̓ám-
house	*ʔahká
hunt, to	*boˑʔó
imperative singular	*-im
jackrabbit	*ʔaˑmáˑqala
jay	*c̓ayi ~ *c̓aˑyi
jealous	*ʔayél
kinsman, one's own, in generations above ego	*-ˑc̓i
laugh, to	*kʰuwáy
leach, to	*kʰeʔé-
leaf (1)	*siʔṭ̓ál
leaf (2)	*xihpʰa
mountain	*dȧˑnó
mouth	*ʔahx̣á
mud	*báˑto
mudhen (?)	*qʰá-c̓iyàt ~ *qʰa-c̓it
mush, acorn	*ṭʰoʔó(ˑ)
mushroom (1)	*hic̓éˑ
mushroom (2)	*k̓aˑlál
mussel (ocean clam ?)	*lȧʔq̓ó
name	*ʔahxí
navel	*ʔohqó-hmo
neck	*q̓óyu
negative (1)	*-tʰin ?
negative (2)	*kʰów ~ *akʰˑów
dip net	*waˑyákʔ/qʔ
new	*xiˑwéy
night	*duwˑé
north	*kuhˑúla ( ?)
nose	*hiˑlá
oak, black	*yuhxíy, *lixúy
oak, live (?)	*maʔk̓i(bʔ)
oak, mush	*c̓ipʰa, *c̓apʰˑa
oak, sp.	*wiyú
oak, white	*qaʔban/l-
object case	*-al ~ *-to
occiput	*kʰaˑyá
on, on top of, above	*wína ~ *wináˑ
one	*k̓á-, *káˑ-
onion, wild	*qʰaʔbat/y
optative	*-ix
pain	*duṭʰál
panther	*yahmóṭʔ
path	*hiʔdá
people, group of people, village, race	*nȧhpʰó
pepperwood tree	*bahˑébʔ
pepperwoodnut	*bahˑé
phlegm	*q̓uʔlés
pick up a non-long object, to	*dihkí
pinole	*yuhhú(ˑ), *yuhx̣ú(ˑ) ?, *yuhhúy, *yuhx̣úyʔ
pitch	*qʰahwé, *qʰahwé
plural act (1)	*-lV-
plural act (2) (with extent?)	*-ma
plural number	*-aya
poison, poisoning song	*q̓oˑʔó ~ *q̓oʔóˑ
poison oak	*hmaˑṭi̇́yu ~ *maˑṭi̇́yuho ?
potato, Indian	*hiʔbúnʸ
pregnant	*wiˑní
quail	*xaqáˑqa
quail topknot	*qʰéya ~ *ʔehqʰéya
raccoon	*qʰaʔdús ~ *qʰahlús ?
rain	*kehkʰé(ˑ) ~ *ihkʰé
raw/alive	*qa(h)xó-
reciprocal	*~(h)ma(ˑ)k̓ ~ *-ma(ˑ)k̓-
reciprocal relationship	*-a(ˑ)q
rectum	*haṭ̓á, *(ṭ̓i ?)
reed, sp.	*c̓iwíx
reflexive	*-i(ˑ)k̓i
rib	*misˑá(ˑ)kʔ
ridge/mountain	*wixálʸ
rock	*qʰaʔbé
salt (1)	*ṭaʔq̓o
salt (2)	*kʰeʔéˑ
sand/gravel	*miˑṭákʔ
saw apart, to	*xuqʰáˑ-
seaweed, edible	*ʔoˑṭóno
second person singular subject	*ʔaˑmá
second person singular object	*míˑ-to ~ *mí-to ~ *mi-tó
second person singular possessive prefix	*mi-
second person plural subject	*ʔaˑmá-ya
second person plural object	*ʔaˑmá-ya-l
see	*kád-, *káˑd-
seed	* ?isóˑ, *ʔisóy
semelfactive	*-ki-
sentence connective (1)	*-pʰila
sentence connective (2)	*-pʰi
sentence connective (3)	*-in
separate from someone, to	*q̓á(ˑ), *q̓a-(m-)(h)mak̓
shoulder	*c̓uwáˑ
sibling, younger	*ṭ̓áqi
sinew	*hiˑmá
sister, father's	*múc̓i ~ *múˑc̓i ~ *wéˑqi
sister, mother's older	*ṭʰúˑc̓
sister, mother's younger	*xéˑqi
sister, older	*déˑqi
sister's husband	*kóˑdʔ, *qóˑdʔ ?
sit, to	*ká-
sit down, to	*kahkí-
six	*lanká, *káci
skin	*ćʔdá
skunk	*nupʰéṭ
sky	*qalí, *qalínʸ
sleep, to	*siˑmán
slow	*pʰaláˑ
slug	*paʔláˑ
smoke	*ʔohx̣ósa(xà), *saxá
snot	*hiˑlásu
snow	*ʔihyúlʸ
soaproot	*haʔˑá(ˑ)bʔ
son-in-law	*hkéye
sour	*móc̓ ~ *móˑc̓
south	*ʔiyó
speculative	*-xe-
spider	*ʔikʰáˑ, *mikʰá, *ikʰá
spit	*ʔihqʰetʔ
spleen	*maṭ́éˑ
spring (of water)	*(qʰa) qahpʰá
squirrel	*kuˑmáṭʔ, *qumáṭ
stink, to	*mihxé
stop doing, to	*-hyéˑ-
stories, myths, to tell	*maṭúˑ
string	*suˑlímaṭʔ
suckerfish	*xamólʸ
sun	*haʔdá
sweat	*mikʰˑéq
tail	*hibá
talk, to	*kȧhnów
tears	*huʔuy-qʰà(ˑ)
testicles	*yȧqolʸ
thing	*á(ˑ)maˑ
third person masculine singular subject	*hamíyabʔ
third person masculine singular object	*hamíˑb-al
third person feminine singular subject	*hamíyadʔ
third person feminine singular object	*hamíˑd-al
third person singular possessive prefix	*hamíyaˑ-
throat	*mihyánʸ
tick	*aṭ̓aʔláˑ
tongue	*haʔbálʸ ~ *hawba(ˑ) ~ *hibʔa
tooth	*hȧʔˑo
tree	*qʰaˑlé
tule, round	*bakóˑ
tule sprout	*ṭʰiʔbéˑ
two	*ʔaqʰóc
umbilicus	*ʔohqó
uphill	*dȧnóˑ
valley, clearing	*qahqó
walk, to	*hwáˑd-, *wáˑd-
water	*ʔahqʰá
west (1)	*mihila, *mix̣ila
west (2)	*bóˑ
what	*(baˑ)q́o(ˑ)
whistle	*li(?)búˑ
white	*qahlé
wildcat	*dȧˑlóm(ʔ)
wind	*ʔihyá
winter	*qʰu(ʔ)c̓áˑ-
wolf	*cihméwa ~ *ciméwa
woman	*ʔimáˑta
wood	*ʔahx̣áy
wood duck	*waṭá-
wood rat	*mihyóqʔ
worm (1)	*biˑlá
worm (2)	*ʔikʰólʸ

== See also ==
- Boontling – a constructed dialect of English incorporating Pomo words
- Central, Northern and Southern Pomo Language Apps are available in the App Store. Southern Pomo currently has 2 apps available. One called Learn Southern Pomo - alphabet and one called Southern Pomo Language - Intro.
