= Central Pomo language =

Extinct Pomoan language of California

Central Pomo
- Native to: United States
- Region: Northern California
- Extinct: by 2000
- Language family: Hokan?: Pomoan; Western; Southern; Central Pomo

Language codes
- ISO 639-3: poo
- Glottolog: cent2138
- ELP: Central Pomo
- The seven Pomoan languages with an indication of their pre-contact distribution within California; Central Pomo in green

Central Pomo is an extinct Pomoan language spoken in Northern California. Pre-contact speakers of all the Pomoan languages have been estimated at 8,000 all together. This estimation was from the American anthropologist Alfred Kroeber.

"The Central Pomo language was traditionally spoken from the Russian River southwest of Clear Lake to the Pacific coast. There were settlements along the Russian River (in the southern Ukiah Valley, in Hopland Valley, and further south near the Sonoma County line), in the coastal region (at Manchester, Point Arena, and at the mouth of the Gualala River), and in the region between the two (around Yorkville and in Anderson Valley)."

It has a consonant inventory that is identical to the related Southern Pomo language with the following exceptions:

Central Pomo distinguishes velar /k/, /kʰ/, /kʼ/ from uvular /q/, /qʰ/, /qʼ/. It lacks a non-ejective alveolar affricate (i.e., it does not have /ts/ as a phoneme), and does not have length, in the form of geminate root consonants, as found in Southern Pomo.

As of 2013, a transcription project of Central Pomo materials collected by J.P. Harrington is underway.

== Phonology ==
Consonants
			Bilabial	Dental	Alveolar	Postalveolar	Palatal	Velar	Uvular	Glottal
Stop	Voiced		b		d					
Stop	Voiceless	Plain	p	t̪	t			k	q	ʔ
Stop	Voiceless	Aspirated	pʰ	t̪ʰ	tʰ			kʰ	qʰ	
Stop	Voiceless	Ejective	pʼ	t̪ʼ	tʼ			kʼ	qʼ	
Affricate		Plain			t͡s	t͡ʃ				
Affricate		Aspirated				t͡ʃʰ				
Affricate		Ejective			t͡sʼ	t͡ʃʼ				
Nasal			m		n					
Fricative					s	ʃ				h
Approximant			w		l		j			

Vowels
	Front		Central		Back	
	short	long	short	long	short	long
Close	i	iː			u	uː
Mid	e	eː			o	oː
Open			a	aː		

/e/ may also be heard as [ɛ].
