= Kashaya language =

Native American language

Kashaya
- Southwestern Pomo
- Kʼahšá:ya
- Native to: United States
- Region: Sonoma County, California
- Ethnicity: Kashia
- Native speakers: c. 12 (2021)
- Language family: Hokan ?: Pomoan; Western; Southern; Kashaya

Language codes
- ISO 639-3: kju
- Glottolog: kash1280
- ELP: Kashaya
- The seven Pomoan languages with an indication of their pre-contact distribution within California; Kashaya in blue

- Kashaya is classified as Critically Endangered by the UNESCO Atlas of the World's Languages in Danger.

Kashaya (also Southwestern Pomo, Kashia) is the critically endangered language of the Kashia band of the Pomo people. The Pomoan languages have been classified as part of the Hokan language family (although the status of Hokan itself is controversial). The name Kashaya corresponds to words in neighboring languages with meanings such as "skillful" and "expert gambler". It is spoken by the Kashia Band of Pomo Indians of the Stewarts Point Rancheria. In 2021, the number of speakers was estimated to be around a dozen.

== Phonology ==
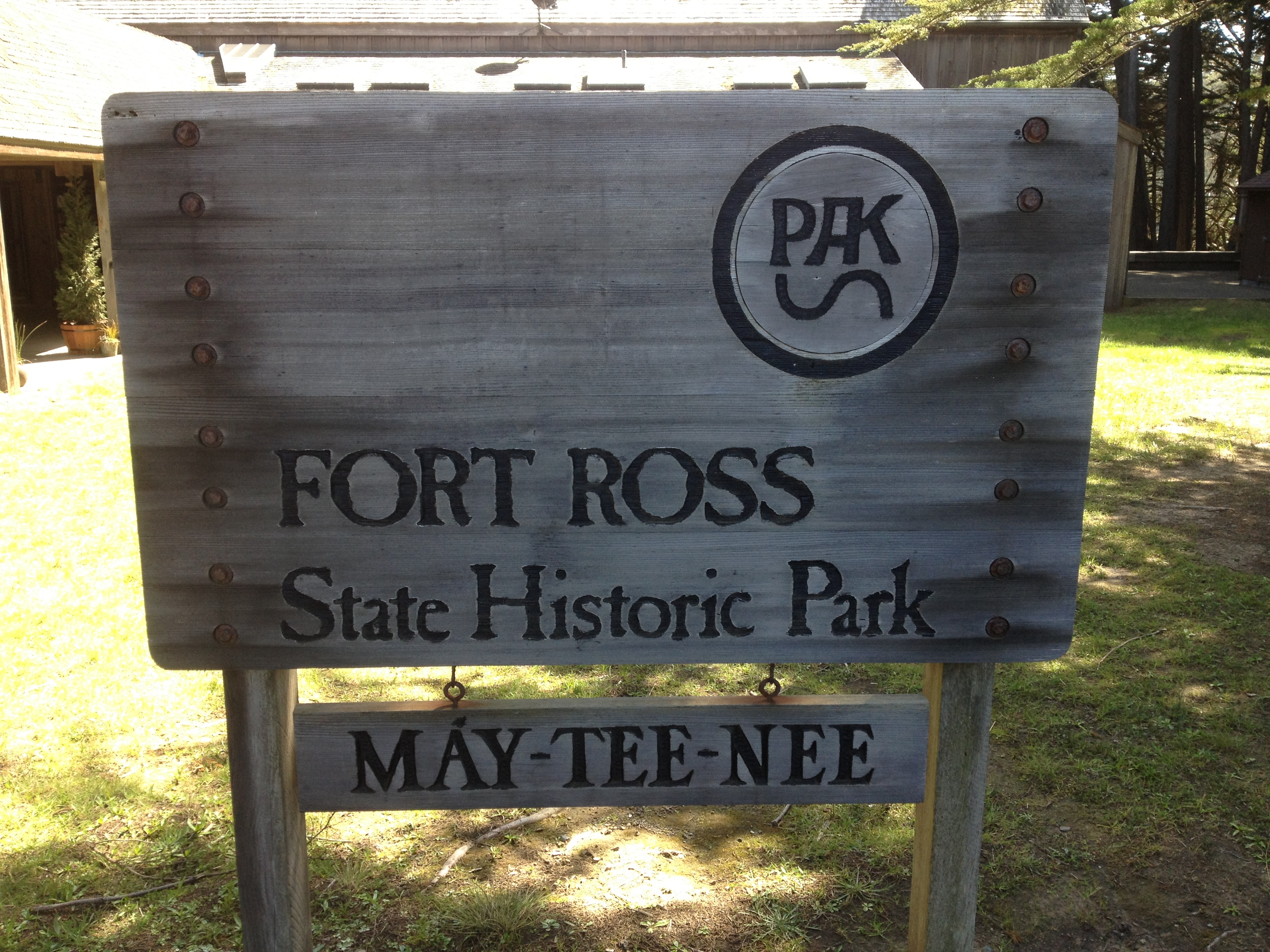
Fort Ross sign with Kashaya placename /mé·ṭiʔni/, anglicized as "May-tee-nee"

=== Vowels ===
Kashaya has five vowels, which all occur as short and long. In the orthography established by Robert Oswalt, long vowels are represented by a raised dot (·).

	Short		Long	
	Front	Back	Front	Back
High	i	u	iː	uː
Mid	e	o	eː	oː
Low	a		aː	

Vowel length is contrastive in pairs such as ʔihya "bone" versus ʔihya: "wind", and dono "hill, mountain" versus dono: "uphill".

=== Consonants ===
Kashaya has the consonants shown in the chart below, following the transcription style established by Oswalt (1961). The letter ⟨c⟩ represents the affricate /t͡ʃ/, which patterns phonologically as a palatal stop. The coronal stops differ not so much in the location of the contact against the top of the mouth as in the configuration of the tongue. The dental stop ⟨t⟩ is described by Oswalt (1961) as post-dental among older speakers but as interdental among younger speakers more heavily influenced by English, similar to the place of articulation of /θ/. This dental stop has a laminal articulation perhaps best transcribed in IPA as /t̻/. The alveolar stop ⟨ṭ⟩ is an apical articulation, more precisely /t̺/. For younger speakers it resembles the English /t/ in position. This chart treats aspirated and glottalized sonorants each as individual segments; Oswalt analyzes them as sequences of a sonorant plus /h/ or /ʔ/, from which they often derive, and they are treated as such in Kashaya dictionaries.

		Labial	Dental	Alveolar	Palatal	Velar	Uvular	Glottal
Plosive	plain	p	t [t̻]	ṭ [t̺]	c [t͡ʃ]	k	q	ʔ
Plosive	aspirated	pʰ	tʰ [t̻ʰ]	ṭʰ [t̺ʰ]	cʰ [t͡ʃʰ]	kʰ	qʰ	
Plosive	ejective	pʼ	tʼ [t̻ʼ]	ṭʼ [t̺ʼ]	cʼ [t͡ʃʼ]	kʼ	qʼ	
Plosive	voiced	b		d [d̺]				
Fricative	voiceless	(f)		s	š [ʃ]			h
Fricative	ejective			sʼ				
Nasal	plain	m		n				
Nasal	aspirated	mʰ		nʰ				
Nasal	glottalized	mʼ		nʼ				
Approximant	plain	w		l (r)	y [j]			
Approximant	aspirated	wʰ		lʰ (rʰ)	yʰ [jʰ]			
Approximant	glottalized	wʼ		lʼ (rʼ)	yʼ [jʼ]			

The consonants /f, r/ occur only in loanwords; due to the influence of English, loans from Spanish and Russian receive a pronunciation of /r/ like that in American English. The voiced stops /b, d/ are the realization of /mʼ, nʼ/ in onset position.

=== Syllable structure ===
In the normal case, every syllable requires a single onset consonant; no onset clusters are permitted. In most contexts, the rhyme consists of a vowel that may be long or followed by a single consonant in the coda, resulting in the possible syllables CV, CV꞉, and CVC. Examples of these structures are duwi "coyote", mo꞉de꞉ "is running (non-final)", and kʰošciʔ "to bow".

A few loanwords do have an onset cluster, such as fré꞉nu "bridle" and stú꞉fa "stove" (from Spanish freno, estufa). Loans may also have superheavy CV꞉C syllables, since stressed vowels in the source language are typically borrowed with a long vowel: pó꞉spara "match", kú꞉lpa "fault", pé꞉cʰka "brick" (Spanish fósforo, culpa; Russian pécka "oven"). An exceptional word with CVCC is huʔúyṭʼboṭʼbo "gnat".

Superheavy CV꞉C and CVCC syllables are well attested word-finally in specific verb forms. For example, the Suppositional suffix /insʼ/ can be final as in /mo-ala-insʼ/ yielding mo꞉lansʼ "he must have run down". More typically a superheavy syllable occurs when the rightmost suffix is one of several evidential suffixes containing an /a/ vowel that deletes when no other suffix follows, such as the Circumstantial /qa/ in sinamqʰ "he must have drowned" and the Visual /ya/ in moma꞉y "I saw it run in".

=== Stress ===
The determination of stress is quite complex and the main stress can fall on any of the first five syllables in a phrase, depending on various factors. According to the analysis in Buckley (1994), iambs are constructed from left to right and the leftmost foot generally receives the main stress: (momácʰ)(mela) "I ran in", (kél)(macʰ) "he is peeking in there". Non-initial feet do not receive secondary stress but lead to lengthening of vowels in open syllables (which however does not apply to word-final vowels nor to a large set of suffixes occurring toward the end of the word). The initial syllable is extrametrical unless the word begins with a monosyllabic root, as in the case of /mo/ "run". For example, the footing in ca(qʰamá꞉)(lawi꞉)(biʔ) "start to cut downward" with the root /caqʰam/ "cut" skips the first syllable, while in (momú꞉)(licʼe꞉)(duce꞉)du "keep running all the way around" this is blocked by the short root /mo/ "run".

The pattern is further complicated when the first foot begins on a syllable that has a long vowel, as in di꞉cʼ- "tell". If the following syllable is closed, the stress shifts to the foot that contains that syllable: (di꞉)(cʼáh)(qaw) "cause to bring a message out here". If the long vowel is followed by a CV syllable, i.e. if the initial sequence to be footed is CV꞉CV, the length moves rightward to create CVCV꞉ and the stress similarly shifts to the next foot: (dicʼa꞉)(qocʼí) "bring a message out!". Combined with extrametricality, this can lead to stress as far in as the fifth syllable: mu(naci꞉)(ducé꞉)du "always be too shy" from the root /muna꞉c/ "be shy"; this verb forms a minimal pair with /munac/ "gather", which lacks stress shift in mu(nací꞉)(duce꞉)du "always gather".

While iambic lengthening is determined by footing within a word, stress can be reassigned at the phrasal level across word boundaries: qʼoʔ(di ʔí)(ce꞉)du "be good!" where qʼoʔdi is the adjective "good" and the remainder is the imperative verb.

=== Phonological processes ===
A large number of processes affect the realization of underlying sounds in Kashaya. A representative sample is given here.

- The glottalized nasals /mʼ, nʼ/ surface unchanged in the syllable coda, but change to voiced stops /b, d/ in the onset: cf. the root /canʼ/ "see, look" in canʼpʰi "if he sees" and cadu "look!".
- The default vowel /i/ changes to /a/ after /m/, and to /u/ after /d/ (from underlying /nʼ/): cf. the imperative /i/ in hanoy-i "limp!", pʰa-nem-a "punch him!", cad-u "look!".
- Any vowel changes to /a/ after a uvular: /ʔusaq-in/ → ʔusá꞉qan "while washing the face", /sima꞉q-eti/ → sima꞉qatí "although he's asleep".
- Plain stops are aspirated in the coda: /da-hyut-meʔ/ → dahyútʰmeʔ "break it!" (formal imperative); cf. /da-hyut-i/ → dahyutí "break it!" (informal).
- A uvular stop in the coda generally loses its place of articulation: /sima꞉q-ti/ → simahti "about to fall asleep". Exceptions exist before certain suffixes and in loanwords such as taqʰma "dress" (from Alutiiq). Debuccalization of other stops occurs in various contexts as well.
- An aspirated stop in a prefix dissimilates from an /h/ or an aspirated stop at the beginning of the root, similar to Grassmann's Law: cf. the prefix /pʰu/ "by blowing" with aspiration in pʰu-de꞉du "be blown along" but without it in pu-hcew "a windbreak".

== Morphology ==
Kashaya can be classified as a polysynthetic language; it is primarily suffixing but has an important set of instrumental prefixes on verbs.

=== Nouns ===
Noun morphology is modest. The main examples are prefixes that mark possession of kinship terms. The first person has several allomorphs including the prefix ʔa꞉- and CV꞉ reduplication; the latter is informal and is associated with phonologically less marked stems, no doubt derived historically from child pronunciations. The prefixes mi-, miya꞉-, ma- mark second, third, and reflexive ("one's own"). These prefixes occur with the suffixes -nʼ, -sʼ depending on the stem and prefix. Examples with /qa/ "grandmother" are miqasʼ "your ~", miyá꞉qasʼ "his/her/their ~", and informal ka꞉kanʼ "my grandma", based on /ka/ simplified from /qa/.

=== Verbs ===
Verbs take a great variety of suffixes divided into many position classes. There are also instrumental prefixes that figure crucially in the use of many verb stems.

==== Position classes ====
Oswalt (1961) identifies the following position classes; it can be seen that there is far more complexity in the set of suffixes than in the prefixes.

- Prefixes
  - A — Instrumental
  - B — Plural Act
- Root
- Inner Group Suffixes
  - I — Plural Agent
  - II — Reduplication
  - III — Essive, Terrestrial
  - IV — Semelfactive, Inceptive, Plural Act, Plural Movement
- Middle Group Suffixes
  - Va — Directionals
  - Vb — Directionals/Inceptives
  - VI — Reflexive, Reciprocal
  - VII — Causative
  - VIII — Locomotory
  - IX — Durative
  - X — Distributive
- Outer Group Suffixes
  - XI — Defunctive
  - XII — Negative
  - XIII — First Person Object, Remote Past, Inferential
  - XIV — Evidentials, Modals, Imperatives, Futures, Absolutive, Adverbializers
  - XVv — Nonfinal Verb, Responsive, Interrogative
  - XVn — Subjective, Objective
  - XVb — Explanatory

Only a few of the most important categories can be illustrated here.

==== Instrumental prefixes ====
Many verbs cannot occur without a prefix that provides information about the manner of the action described. These 20 instrumental prefixes, all of the shape CV, are the following.

- ba- "with the lips, snout, or beak; by speech (or hearing)"
- bi- "by encircling, e.g. with the arms; by sewing, eating (esp. with a spoon)"
- ca- "with the rear end, a massive or bulky object, a knife"
- cu- "with a round object, flowing water, the front end; by shooting"
- cʰi- "by holding a small part of a larger object, e.g. a handle"
- da- "with the hand (palm), paw; by waves"
- du- "with the finger"
- di- "by gravity, falling, a heavy weight"
- ha- "with a swinging motion"
- hi- "with the body"
- ma- "with the sole of the foot, claws, the butt of the hand"
- mi- "with the small end of a long object, the toes, nose; by kicking, smelling, counting, reading"
- mu- "with a quick movement, heat, light, mind or emotions"
- pʰa- "with the end of a long object, the fist; by wrapping"
- pʰi- "with the side of a long object, the eyes, an ax, a hammer"
- pʰu- "by blowing"
- qa- "between forces: with the teeth, by chewing, eating"
- si- "by water: wetting, dissolving, slipping, floating, rain, tongue"
- ša- "by a long object moving lengthwise; with a mesh"
- šu- "by pulling, pushing and pulling; with a long flexible object"

For example, the root /hcʰa/ "knock over" can occur unprefixed as "fall over" where no agency is indicated, but is typically prefixed to expand upon the meaning: ba-hcʰa- "knock over with snout", bi-hcʰa- "throw someone in wrestling", ca-hcʰa- "knock over by backing into", da-hcʰa- "push over with the hand", du-hcʰa- "push over with the finger", di-hcʰa- "be knocked over by a falling object", etc.

==== Suffixes ====
A sampling of verb suffixes:

- Directionals include -ad "along, here", -mul "around", -mad "in an enclosed or defined place", -aq "out from here; north or west from here".
- Directionals/Inceptives -ala "down" and -ibic "up, away" also mark the beginning of an action.
- Causative -hqa.
- Durative -ad with many other allomorphs, such as -id, -cid, -med, depending on the preceding segment and the length of the stem.
- Evidentials include quotative -do, circumstantial -qa, and visual -ya. The /a/ of the evidentials deletes when no other suffix follows.
- Absolutive -w after vowels, -u after /d/, and -ʔ after other consonants.

Position class XIV (Evidentials, Modals, Imperatives, Futures, Absolutive, Adverbializers) represents the largest set of suffixes and is the only slot that is obligatorily filled in every verb.

A few examples of verbs with many affixes, the root shown in bold:

- pʰa-**ʔdi**-c-á꞉d-ala-w "to poke with the end of a stick while moving downhill"
- cʰi-**ʔdí**-ccicʼ-a꞉dad-u "to walk along picking up things and pulling them close to oneself"
- **nohpʰo**-yíʔ-ciʔ-do "it's said that those former people used to live (like that)"

== Syntax ==
The basic word order of Kashaya is quite flexible in main clauses; however, the default location for the verb is final, and this position is required in subordinate clauses. A notable feature is that when a verb does occur in non-final position, depending on other suffixes present it takes the Nonfinal Verb ending -e꞉. Some possible orders are illustrated here with the simple sentence "I see that dog", containing the elements ʔa "I (subj)", mul "that (obj)", hayu "dog", canʼ- "see".

- hayu mul ʔa canʼ
- hayu ʔa mul canʼ
- hayu ʔa cade꞉ mul
- cade꞉ ʔa hayu mul

Oswalt (1961) reports that younger speakers tend to favor the SVO order typical of English.

=== Case marking ===
The most important case markers are subjective and objective case. (Others are the vocative and comitative, of more limited application.) Most nouns are marked with the subjective ʔem or the objective ʔel; these are morphologically complex and contain the actual case markers /m/ and /l/, found with verbal expressions.

- ʔacacʼ em ʔima꞉ta ʔél cadu — "the man (ʔacac) sees the woman (ʔima꞉ta)"
- ʔahca qáwiwa-l cadé꞉ ʔa — "I see the house (ʔahca) he is building (qawiwa-)"

Personal names take the suffix -to in the objective case, zero in the subjective.

Pronouns have distinct forms in subjective and objective case; the forms are not easily analyzed but the objective case generally ends in -(a)l or -to.

		singular		plural	
		subjective	objective	subjective	objective
1st person		ʔa(꞉)	to(꞉)	ya	yal
2nd person		ma	mito	maya	mayal
3rd person	masc	mu꞉kinʼ	mu꞉kito, mu꞉bal	ma꞉cac	ma꞉cal
3rd person	fem	manʼ	ma꞉dal	ma꞉cac	ma꞉cal
Reflexive		ti(꞉)	tito	same as singular	

Demonstratives are also distinguished for case; they are given here as subjective/objective:

- mu(꞉) / mul — "that, this, it, those, these, they (vague demonstrative or anaphoric reference)"
- maʔu / maʔal — "this, these (the closer object)"
- haʔu / haʔal — "that, those (the further object)"

=== Switch reference ===
Switch reference refers to markings according to whether a subordinate verb has the same or different subject as the main verb. In Kashaya it also marks whether the time of the action is the same, or preceding the main verb action in the past or future. There is no consistent expression of these categories except for the element /pʰi/ in both future suffixes, but the remaining /la/ is not identifiable as a separate suffix.

	Simultaneous	Past	Future
Same subject	-in	-ba	-pʰi
Different subject	-em	-wli, -ʔli	-pʰila

The suffix containing /li/ is realized as -wli after vowels, -u꞉li (or /uwli/) after d, and -ʔli after other consonants; this allomorphy is related to that of the very common Absolutive suffix, -w, -u, -ʔ. A few examples of these morphemes:

- tʼeti꞉bícʰ-pʰi maya miyícʼkʰe — "you should stand up and (then) speak" [same subject, future tense]
- pʰala cóhtoʔ, duwecí꞉d-em — "he left again as night was falling" [different subject, simultaneous]
- cohtóʔ da꞉qacʼ-ba cohtó꞉y — "having wanting to go, he went" [same subject, past tense]
- ʔama: qʰaʔa꞉dú-ʔli, cohtoʔ — "after morning had come, she left" [different subject, past tense]; consonant-final stem /qʰaʔa-aduc/

== Notable Kashaya Pomo speakers ==
- Pomo speaker Langford "Lanny" Roger Pinola (April 25, 1938 – April 21, 2003) lived on the Kashaya Reservation until age six.
- Essie Pinola Parrish (1902–1979), a noted basketweaver, educated Kashaya children in the language, and "compiled a Kashaya Pomo dictionary, working with Robert Oswalt, a Berkeley scholar well-known in the field of Indian linguistics."

== See also ==
- Pomoan languages
- Pomo people
- Fort Ross, California
