= Post Pattern =

Post pattern also may refer to a particular American football strategy, the Post (route).

The Post Pattern refers to a Paleo-Indian archaeological culture of artifacts found in northwest California dating between 9,000 and 13,000 years ago. Excavation sites are around Clear Lake and Borax Lake. The Post Pattern is a local manifestation of the Western Pluvial Lakes Tradition.

It is believed that Post Pattern peoples were a pre-Hokan group. The hypothetical entrance of peoples speaking Hokan languages dates from about 6,000-8,000 years ago in what is known as the Lower Archaic Period. The Post Pattern is associated with the Yuki–Wappo language family.

The pattern is named after Chester C. Post who in 1938 introduced it to the archaeological world.

== See also ==
- Paleo Indians
- Archaeology of the Americas
- Yuki–Wappo languages
- Yuki people
- Wappo people
- Archaeological culture

== Bibliography ==
- Chartkoff, Joseph L.; & Chartkoff, Kerry Kona. (1984). The archaeology of California. Stanford: Stanford University Press.
- Fagan, Brian. (2003). Before California: An archaeologist looks at our earliest inhabitants. Lanham, MD: Rowman & Littlefield Publishers.
- Harrington, M. R. (1948). An ancient site at Borax Lake California. Southwest Museum papers (No. 16). Los Angeles: Southwest Museum.
- Meighan, Clement W.; & Haynes, C. Vance. (1968). New studies on the age of the Borax Lake site. Berkeley, CA: California Indian Library Collections Project.
- Moratto, Michael J.; & Fredrickson, David A. (1984). California archaeology. Orlando: Academic Press.
