= Laura Somersal =

Last speaker of Wappo and basketweaver (1892–1990)

Laura Fish Somersal
- Born: Dolores Fish; December 10, 1892; Geyserville, California
- Died: July 30, 1990 (aged 97)
- Known for: Basketry, last speaker of the Wappo language, teacher and consultant
- Spouse: James Somersal
- Children: 1

Laura Fish Somersal (born Dolores Fish; December 10, 1892 – July 30, 1990) was a Pomo-Wappo basketweaver, educator, and the last speaker of the Wappo language.

== Biography ==
Fish was born Dolores Fish in Geyserville, California on December 10, 1892. She was the daughter of Bill Fish, of the Southern Pomo tribe and Mary John Eli of the Wappo people. In 1915, she moved to the Dry Creek Rancheria, where her ancestors cultivated sedge for basketmaking in the Dry Creek Valley before the arrival of white settlers. Over the course of her lifetime, she was witness to the dwindling and near loss of her tribes, the land they called home in California's Sonoma Valley, and the traditional materials used to create the intricate baskets she became known for.

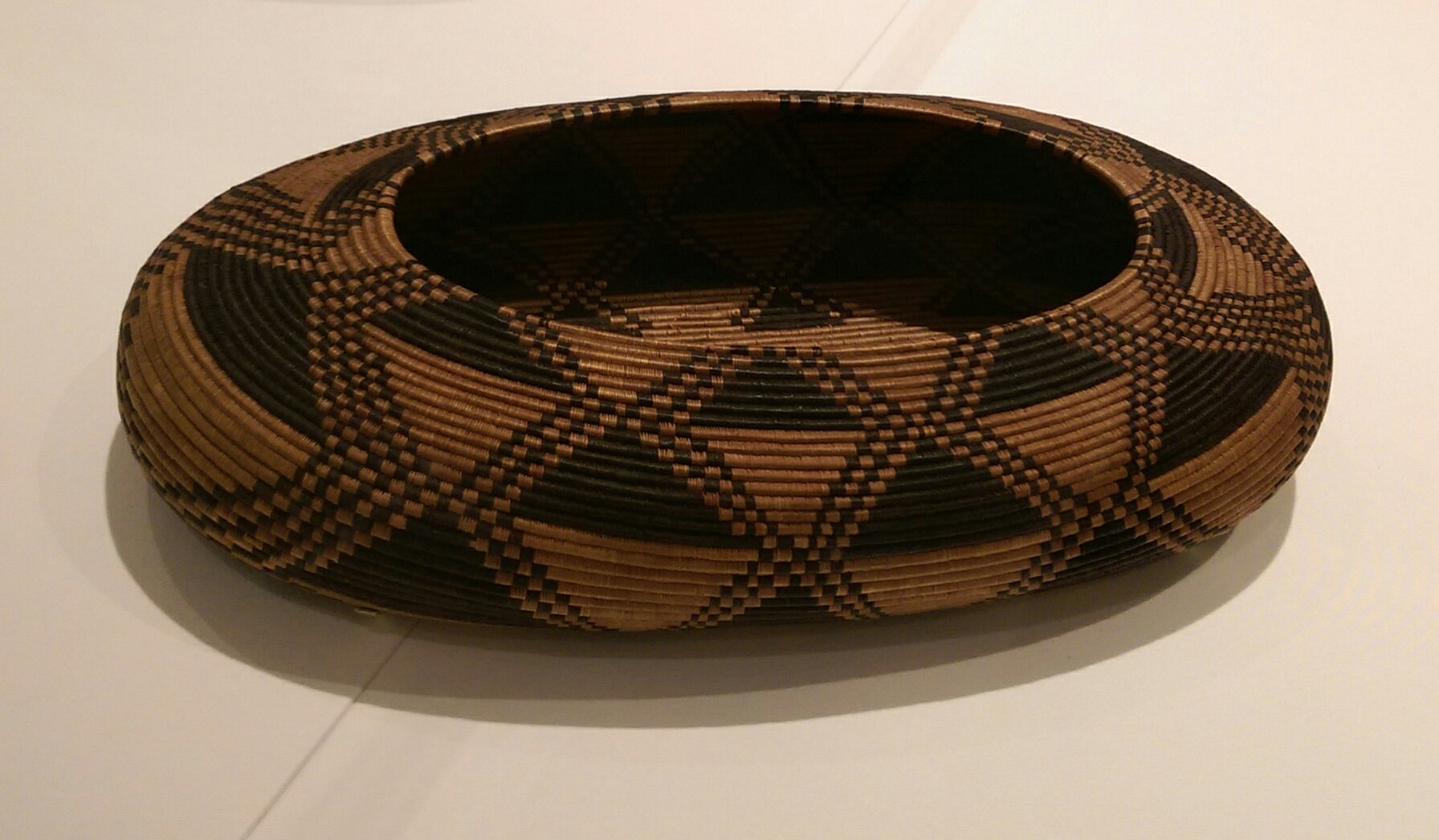
Example of a Pomo basket (not by Laura Somersal)

=== Basketry ===
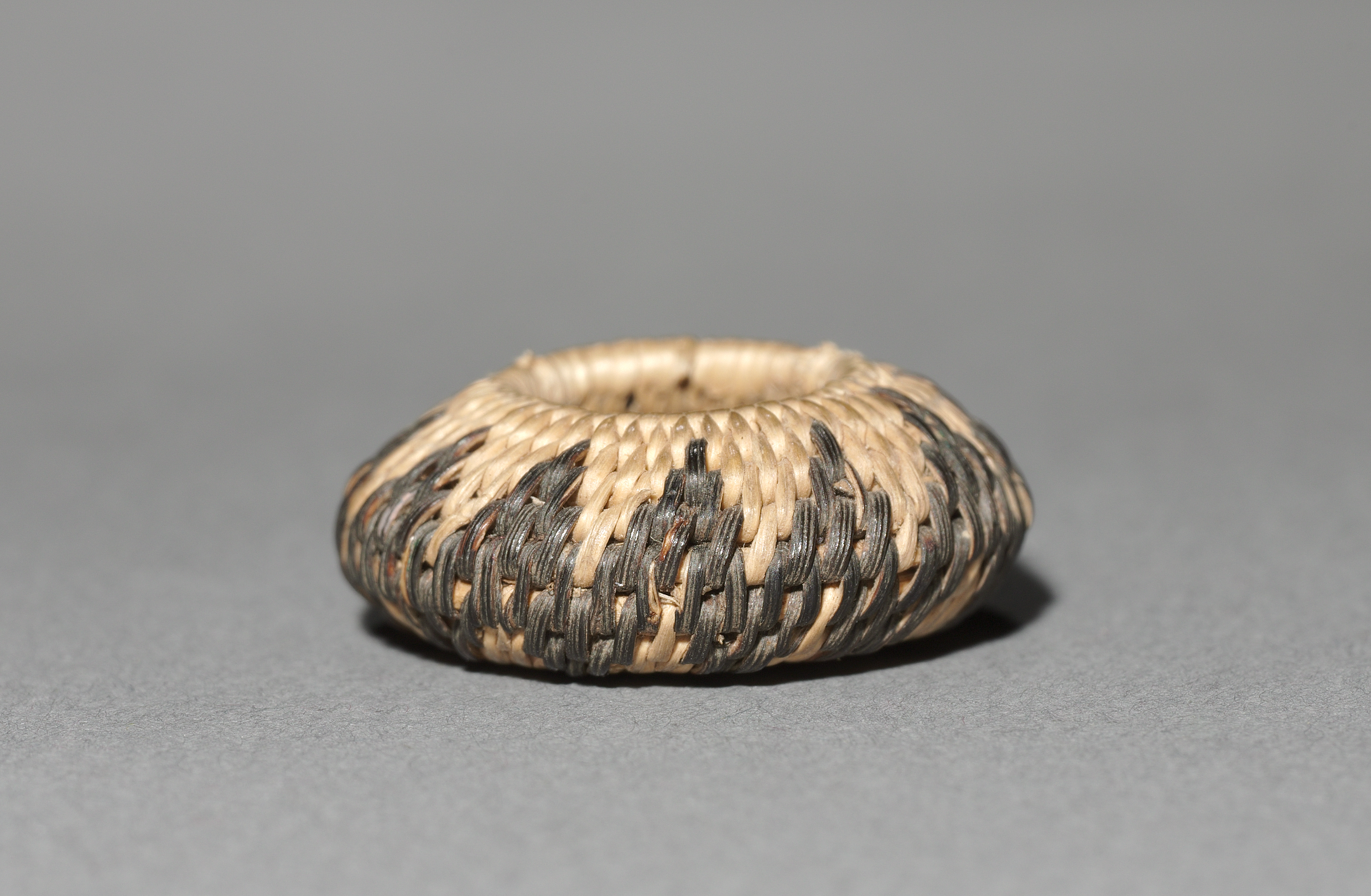
Example of miniature Pomo basket, maker unknown

Her cousin first taught her the Pomo basket weaving style at age eight. She would learn from elders in her community and grew her talent, eventually becoming one of the most talented Pomo basket weavers. In the late 1940s, she was recognized as one of the last Pomo basket weavers left on the Reservation, as many had left due to the living conditions. At the time, she noted there was little demand for her basketry, compared to the amount of labor they took to produce. To craft a traditional Pomo basket, Somersal would have to dig the roots of the sedge, soak, and dry them to shape before weaving. The tight weave of the Pomo baskets let them to a myriad of uses. Somersal recalled how her mother used the baskets for everything, including cooking acorn mush, gathering water and carrying babies.

Despite little demand for the baskets, Somersal maintained the tradition, until interest in the skills began to grow. In 1979, she took her first airplane trip to New York to teach basketry at several museums in Manhattan, New York. She would then teach the craft to others at Sonoma State University, UC Berkeley and elsewhere, to preserve the ancient tradition. Somersal would often invite interested learners to her home at the Dry Creek Rancheria where she lived.

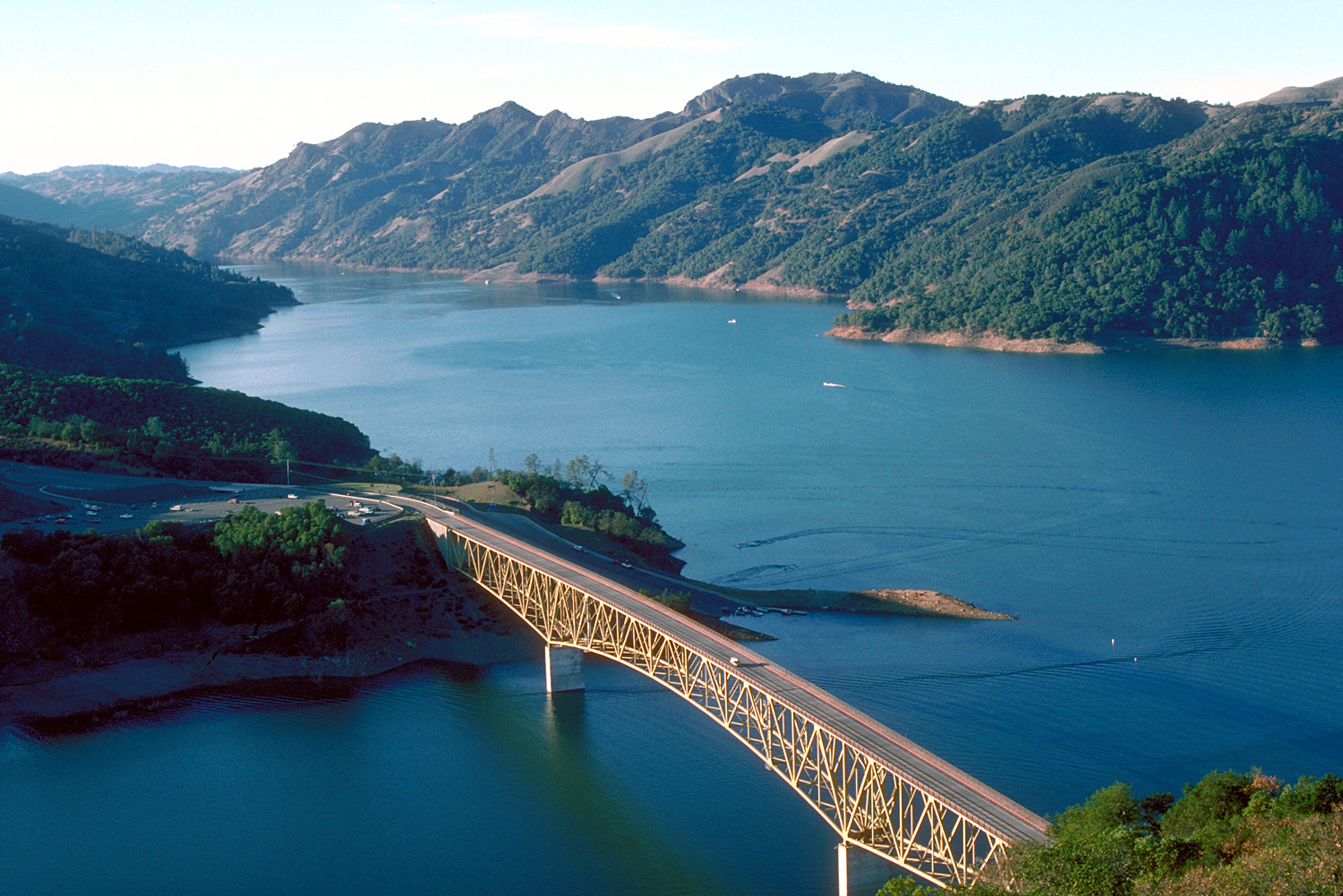
Sonoma Lake, created when the Warm Springs Dam was built on the land inhabited by Somersal's tribe

=== Activism ===
Somersal gathered the materials for her basketry near her home in Warm Springs. When the development of the Warm Springs Dam was announced, Somersal actively worked to support efforts stop the Dam's construction. Somersal was vocal in her opposition to the displacement of the land, people and flora of the Warm Springs region, where her grandmother had lived before "whites threw the tribe out". When those efforts by her and her fellow tribe members failed, she concentrated on encouraging the transplanting of Californian sedge that would be displaced by the dam's construction. The roots of the sedge were unique to the area and integral to the creation of Pomo basketry. In 1979, due to efforts by Somersal and other Pomo basket weavers, 39,000 plants were transplanted by the Army Corps of Engineers to make way for the creation of Lake Sonoma. Despite their efforts, attempts to cultivate the roots and reeds elsewhere were not successful.

Prior to the Dam's construction, Somersal held "Circle of Life" ceremonies at the site. In 1982, she appeared as a witness in U.S. District Court over a freedom of religion case after the U.S. Army Corps of Engineers denied access to tribal members of the Dry Creek valley hot springs area. Tribal members were cited for trespassing while collecting spring water, herbs and clay. The dam, created in 1983 has continued to be a source of tension for the native people who resided at the site for 10,000 years, and who considered the basin's hot springs to be sacred.

=== Wappo language ===
Laura would become the last fluent speaker of the Wappo language, after learning to speak the language with her mother, who was blind. Her mother's blindness prevented her from passing on many of the Wappo names for local landmarks in California, so these names have been lost. Working with language scholars, she helped to create an English-Wappo dictionary and helped with translating the language for its preservation. With her death, the Wappo language became formally extinct.

=== Later life, death and legacy ===
Laura Somersal died at age 97 on July 30, 1990. In 2024, the Healdsburg City Council decided to name a new park after Somersal in recognition of her contributions as a "Culture bearer" and for the community. Somersal's nephew, Clint McKay has continued in her tradition as a Pomo basket weaver.

== Collections and exhibitions ==
- Sense of Place, Sonoma County Museum, 1991
- Woven past and future, Oakland Museum 1996
- "Miniature basket", National Museum of the American Indian
- "Miniature basket", "Basket Start" Santa Rosa Junior College

== See also ==
- Elsie Allen, another renowned Pomo basket weaver and contemporary
