= Yuki people =

Native American group in California, United States

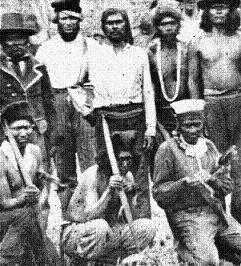
- Yuki men at the Nome Cult Farm, c. 1858

Total population
- 569 alone and in combination (2010)

Regions with significant populations
- United States (California)

Languages
- English, formerly Yuki

Religion
- Shamanism

Related ethnic groups
- Wappo people

The Yuki (also known as Yukiah) are an Indigenous people of California who were traditionally divided into three groups: Ukomno'om ("Valley People", or Yuki proper), Huchnom ("Outside the Valley"), and Ukohtontilka or Ukosontilka ("Ocean People", or Coast Yuki). The territory of these three groups included Round Valley and much of northern Mendocino County and Lake County. Today they are enrolled members of the Round Valley Indian Tribes of the Round Valley Reservation. The exonym "Yuki" may derive from the Wintu word meaning "foreigner" or "enemy."

From 1854 to 1864, as part of the California genocide, the population of the Yuki people was reduced from approximately 20,000 to just several hundred.

Yuki tribes are thought to have settled as far south as Hood Mountain in present-day Sonoma County.

== History ==
Archaeologists, including Alfred Kroeber, have speculated that the Yuki have been resident in California for many thousands of years and once occupying a greater area than their historic homeland in Mendocino County. The Yuki language is an isolate, unrelated to other Native American languages, although distant relationships to other languages have been proposed by Joseph Greenberg and others. Scholars have also said that Yuki physical appearance is different than most other Native American peoples. They are described as short in stature and long-headed (Dolichocephalic), unusual among American Indians, but perhaps similar to the extinct Guaycura and Pericú of Baja California, also believed by archaeologists to be ancient residents of the Americas.

In 1856, the US government established the Indian reservation of Nome Cult Farm (later to become Round Valley Indian Reservation) at Round Valley. It forced thousands of Yuki and other local tribes onto these lands, often without sufficient support for the transition. These events and tensions led to the Mendocino War (1859), where militias of white settlers killed hundreds of Yuki and took others by force to Nome Cult Farm.

== Language ==
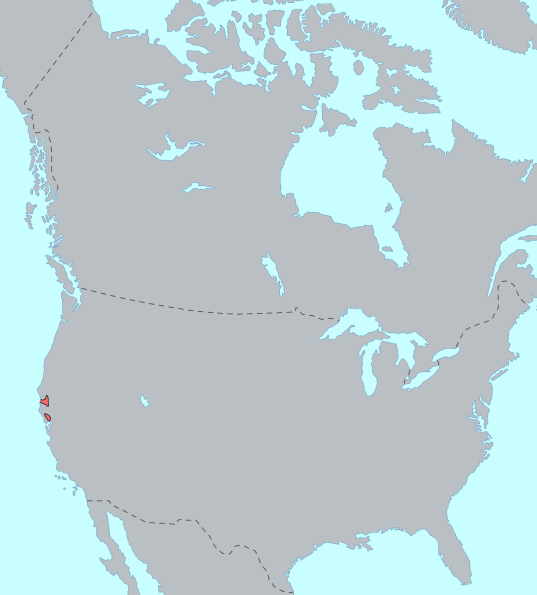
Distribution of Yuki-Wappo languages

The Yuki language has been extinct since its last speaker, Arthur Anderson, died in 1983. It is distantly related to the Wappo language, the two languages making up the entirety of the Yukian language family. The Yuki people had a quaternary (4-based) counting system, based on counting the spaces between the fingers, rather than the fingers themselves.

== Population ==
Scholarly estimates have varied substantially for the pre-contact populations of most native groups in California, as historians and anthropologists have tried to evaluate early documentation. Alfred L. Kroeber estimated the 1770 population of the Yuki proper, Huchnom, and Coast Yuki as 2,000, 500, and 500, respectively, or 3,000 in all. Sherburne F. Cook initially raised this total slightly to 3,500. Subsequently, he proposed a higher estimate of 9,730 Yuki.

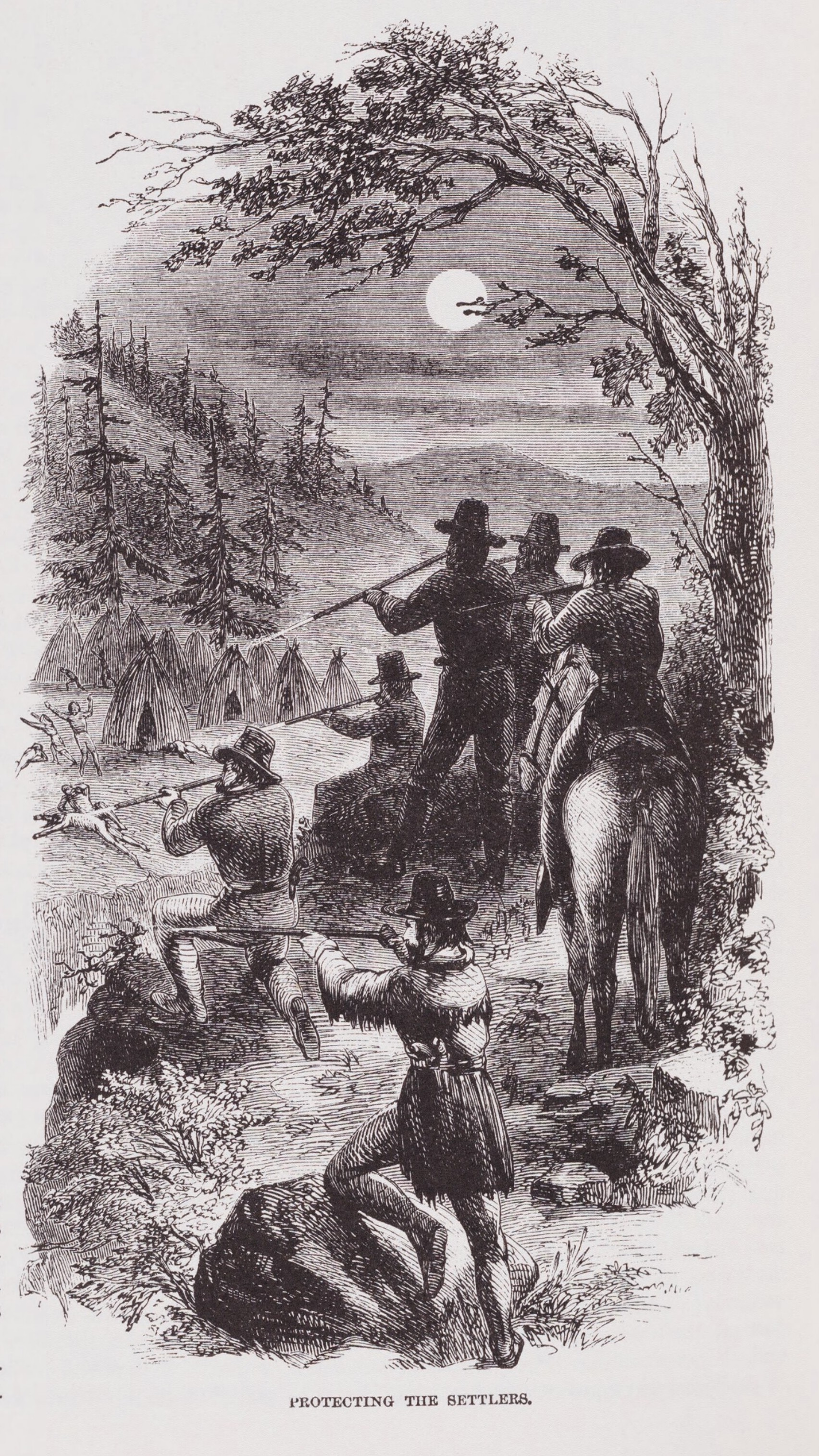
Yuki massacre in Round Valley, California

According to the research of Benjamin Madley, "the Yuki suffered a cataclysmic population decline under United States rule. Between 1854 and 1864, settlement policies, murders, abductions, massacres, rape-induced venereal diseases, and willful neglect at Round Valley Reservation reduced them from perhaps 20,000 to several hundred." In his work, Madley argues that Yuki history constitutes a clear-cut example of genocide. He cites the fact that there is no evidence of any epidemic that would have caused such drastic population decline among the Yuki between 1854 and 1864, other than venereal diseases originating from European settlers. His research thus challenges the idea that the indirect effects of European colonization were the leading cause of population decline and mass death for Native Americans.

E.N. Anderson, a professor of Anthropology at the University of California at Riverside, writes that the extermination of the Yuki, a helpless colonized people, was a genocidal massacre.

Intermarriage among neighboring tribes after their forced relocation to the Round Valley Reservation resulted in large numbers of Native Americans with mixed ancestry. Many of these people are descendants of many local tribes and have come to be called Round Valley Indian Tribes.

In the 2010 census, 569 people claimed Yuki ancestry. 255 of them were full-blooded.

== Culture ==
In the Yuki language, the word 'han' meant house, and their special dance house was known as iwil-han, which translates to either poisonous house or powerful house. The houses had a cone shape that started with a circular base on the ground. When buildings were bigger, they would dig into the earth so that the floor sat below ground level. A main pole in the center held up a bunch of rafter poles. On top of these poles, they layered bark, grass, pine needles, and soil to create the walls. The Yuki tribe's diet mainly consisted of deer, acorns, and salmon. Acorns were very important because they made a mush that showed up in almost every meal the Yuki people ate. Besides these main foods, they also collected lots of other stuff like different kinds of nuts and seeds, clover, tubers and roots, berries, mushrooms, and bird eggs. The Yuki tribe would even eat grasshoppers as part of their food sources.

The Yuki people believed in a deity called TAIKOMOL, which means "the one who travels by himself," along with his assistant Coyote. Their spiritual beliefs also included the MUMOLNO'M, powerful beings that lived up in the mountains and could either heal people or make them sick throughout California. The Yuki also worshipped water spirits known as UKSA and spirits that had power over the souls of deer. When Europeans came and settled in the area, a lot of Yuki people started following Christianity instead. Methodist and Catholic priests came with the settlers, and then in 1930, a Pentecostal church opened up in the region.

== Ethnobotany ==
Yuki people use the large roots of Carex plants to make baskets.

== See also ==
- Yuki traditional narratives
