= Pro-drop language =

Language in which certain pronouns may sometimes be omitted

A pro-drop language (from "pronoun-dropping") is a language in which certain classes of pronouns may be omitted when they can be pragmatically or grammatically inferable. Put simply, some languages (see below) allow omitting the subject of a sentence. The precise conditions vary from language to language, and can be quite intricate. The phenomenon of "pronoun-dropping" is part of the larger topic of zero or null anaphora. The connection between pro-drop languages and null anaphora relates to the fact that a dropped pronoun has referential properties, and so is crucially not a null dummy pronoun.

Pro-drop is a problem when translating to a non-pro-drop language such as English, which requires the pronoun to be added, especially noticeable in machine translation. It can also contribute to transfer errors in language learning.

An areal feature of some European languages is that pronoun dropping is not, or seldom, possible (see Standard Average European); this is the case for English, French, German, and Emilian, among others. In contrast, Japanese, Mandarin Chinese, Vietnamese, Slavic languages, Uralic languages, Assyrian Neo-Aramaic, Kra-Dai languages, Italian, Spanish, and Portuguese exhibit frequent pro-drop features. Some languages, such as Greek and Hindi also exhibit pro-drop in any argument.

== Usage of term ==
In Noam Chomsky's "Lectures on Government and Binding", the term is used for a cluster of properties of which "null subject" was one (for the occurrence of pro as a predicate rather than a subject in sentences with the copula see Moro 1997).

Thus, a one-way correlation was suggested between inflectional agreement (AGR) and empty pronouns on the one hand and between no agreement and overt pronouns, on the other. In the classical version, languages which not only lack agreement morphology but also allow extensive dropping of pronouns—such as Japanese, Chinese, Korean, and Vietnamese—are not included, as is made clear in a footnote: "The principle suggested is fairly general, but does not apply to such languages as Japanese in which pronouns can be missing much more freely." (Chomsky 1981:284, fn 47).

The term pro-drop is also used in other frameworks in generative grammar, such as in lexical functional grammar (LFG), but in a more general sense: "Pro-drop is a widespread linguistic phenomenon in which, under certain conditions, a structural NP may be unexpressed, giving rise to a pronominal interpretation." (Bresnan 1982:384).

The empty category assumed (under government and binding theory) to be present in the vacant subject position left by pro-dropping is known as pro, or as "little pro" (to distinguish it from "big PRO", an empty category associated with non-finite verb phrases).

== Cross-linguistic variation ==
It has been observed that pro-drop languages are those with either rich inflection for person and number (Persian, Polish, Czech, Portuguese, etc.) or no such inflection at all (Japanese, Chinese, Korean, etc.), but languages that are intermediate (English, French) are non-pro-drop.

While the mechanism by which overt pronouns are more "useful" in English than in Japanese is obscure, and there are exceptions to this observation, it still seems to have considerable descriptive validity. As Huang puts it, "Pro-drop is licensed to occur either where a language has full agreement, or where a language has no agreement, but not where a language has impoverished partial agreement."

In pro-drop languages with a highly inflected verbal morphology, the expression of the subject pronoun is considered unnecessary because the verbal inflection indicates the person and number of the subject, thus the referent of the null subject can be inferred from the grammatical inflection on the verb.

Barbosa defines these typological patterns as null-subject languages (NSL), expressing that the term itself, pro-drop, can be subcategorized into categories such as: topic (discourse) pro-drop, partial NSL (partial pro-drop) and consistent NSL (full pro-drop).

== Topic pro-drop languages ==
In everyday speech there are instances when who or what is being referred to — namely, the topic of the sentence — can be inferred from context. Languages which permit the pronoun to be inferred from contextual information are called topic-drop (also known as discourse pro-drop) languages: thus, topic pro-drop languages allow referential pronouns to be omitted, or be phonologically null. (In contrast, languages that lack topic pro-drop as a mechanism would still require the pronoun.) These dropped pronouns can be inferred from previous discourse, from the context of the conversation, or generally shared knowledge. Among major languages, some which might be called topic pro-drop languages are Japanese, Korean, and Mandarin. Topic prominent languages like Korean, Mandarin and Japanese have structures which focus more on topics and comments as opposed to English, a subject-prominent language. It is this topic-first nature that enables the inference of omitted pronouns from discourse.

=== Korean ===
The following example from Jung (2004:719) Korean shows the omission of both pronouns in the subject and object position.

너 이것 필요하니?
Neo igeot pilyohani?
you this need
Do you need this?

필요해
pilyohae
need
(I) need (it).

=== Japanese ===
Consider the following examples from Japanese:

この ケーキ は 美味しい。 誰 が 焼いた の？
Kono kēki wa oishii. Dare ga yaita no?
This cake TOP tasty-PRS Who SUBJ bake-PAST Q
This cake is tasty. Who baked (it)?

知らない。 気に入った？
Shiranai. {Ki ni itta?}
know-NEG. like-PAST
(I) don't know. Did (you) like (it)?

The words in parentheses and boldface in the English translations (it in the first line; I, you, and it in the second) appear nowhere in the Japanese sentences but are understood from context. If nouns or pronouns were supplied, the resulting sentences would be grammatically correct but sound unnatural. Learners of Japanese as a second language, especially those whose first language is non-pro-drop like English or French, often supply personal pronouns where they are pragmatically inferable, an example of language transfer.

=== Mandarin ===
The above-mentioned examples from Japanese are readily rendered into Mandarin:

这 块 蛋糕 很 好吃。 谁 烤 的?
Zhè kuài dàngāo hěn hǎochī. Shéi kǎo de?
This piece cake DEGREE tasty. Who bake MODIFY
This cake is tasty. Who baked (it)?

不 知道。 喜欢 吗?
Bù zhīdào. Xǐhuan ma?
Not know. like Q
(I) don't know. Do (you) like (it)?

Unlike in Japanese, the inclusion of the dropped pronouns does not make the sentence sound unnatural.

=== Vietnamese ===
Vietnamese can naturally omit subjects, especially in universally casual clauses, proverbs and idioms:

Nghe kỹ là hiểu liền.
Listening carefully can understand instantly
By listening carefully, one can understand instantly.

Ăn được ngủ được là tiên.
To-eat well, to-sleep well is-to-be Xian-(a-celestial-transcendent-being)
If one can eat and sleep well, they are Xian.

== Partial pro-drop languages ==
Languages with partial pro-drop have both agreement and referential null subjects that are restricted with respect to their distribution. The partial null-subject languages include most Balto-Slavic languages, which allow for the deletion of the subject pronoun. Hungarian allows deletion of both the subject and object pronouns.

=== Slavic languages ===
The following table provides examples of subject pro-drop in Slavic languages. In each of these examples, the 3rd person masculine singular pronoun 'he' in the second sentence is inferred from context.

Subject pro-drop in Slavic languages
Language	'(I) see [him].'	'(He) is coming.'
Belarusian	Бачу [яго]. Baču [jaho].	Ідзе. Idze.
Bulgarian	Виждам го. Vizhdam go.	Идва. Idva.
Czech	Vidím ho.	Jde.
Macedonian	Го гледам. Go gledam.	Доаѓа. Doaǵa.
Polish	Widzę go.	Idzie.
Russian	Вижу [его]. Vižu [ego].	Идёт. Idët.
Serbo-Croatian	Vidim ga. Видим га.	Dolazi. Долази.
Slovene	Vidim ga.	Prihaja.
Ukrainian	Бачу [його]. Bachu [yoho].	Іде. Ide.

In the East Slavic languages, even the objective pronoun его can be omitted in the present and future tenses (both imperfect and perfective). In these languages, the missing pronoun is not inferred strictly from pragmatics, but partially indicated by the morphology of the verb (Russian вижу, Bulgarian виждам, Polish widzę, Czech vidím, etc.). However, the past tense of both imperfective and perfective in the modern East Slavic languages inflects by gender and number but not person because the present tense conjugations of the copula "to be" (Russian быть, Ukrainian бути, Belarusian быць) have practically fallen out of use. As such, the pronoun is often included in these tenses, especially in writing.

=== Uralic languages ===
In Finnish, the verb inflection replaces first- and second-person pronouns (but not thirds, which remain obligatory) in simple sentences: menen "I go", menette "all of you go". Pronouns are typically left in place only when they need to be inflected, e.g. me "we", meiltä "from us". There are possessive pronouns but possessive suffixes, e.g. -ni as in kissani "my cat", are also used, as in Kissani söi kalan ("my cat ate a fish"). A peculiarity of Colloquial Finnish is that the pronoun me ("we") can be dropped if the verb is placed in the passive voice (e.g. haetaan, Standard "it is fetched", colloquial "we fetch"). Estonian, a close relative of Finnish, has a tendency that is less clear. Literary Estonian generally uses explicit personal pronouns in the literary language, but they are often omitted in colloquial Estonian.

Hungarian is also pro-drop, and subject pronouns are used only for emphasis: (Én) mentem "I went". Because of the definite conjugation, object pronouns can be often elided as well. For example, the question (Ti) látjátok a macskát? "Do (you pl.) see the cat?" can be answered with just látjuk "(We) see (it)" because the definite conjugation renders the object pronoun superfluous.

=== Hebrew ===
Modern Hebrew, like Biblical Hebrew, is a "moderately" pro-drop language. In general, subject pronouns must be included in the present tense. Since Hebrew has no verb forms expressing the present tense, the present tense is formed by using the present participle (somewhat like English I am guarding). The Hebrew participle, as is the case with other adjectives, declines only in grammatical gender and number (like the past tense in Russian), thus:

I (m.) guard (ani shomer) = אני שומר

You (m.) guard (ata shomer) = אתה שומר

He guards (hu shomer) = הוא שומר

I (f.) guard (ani shomeret) = אני שומרת

We (m.) guard (anachnu shomrim) = אנחנו שומרים

Since the forms that are used for the present tense lack the distinction between grammatical persons, explicit pronouns must be added in most cases.

In contrast, the past tense and the future tense the verb form is inflected for person, number, and gender. Therefore, the verb form itself indicates sufficient information about the subject. The subject pronoun is therefore normally dropped, except in third-person.

I (m./f.) guarded (shamarti) = שמרתי

You (m. pl.) guarded (sh'martem) = שמרתם

I (m./f.) will guard (eshmor) = אשמור

You (pl./m.) will guard (tishm'ru) = תשמרו

Many nouns can take suffixes to reflect the possessor in which case the personal pronoun is dropped. In daily usage, the inflection of Modern Hebrew nouns is common only for some nouns. In most cases, inflected possessive pronouns are used. In Hebrew, possessive pronouns are treated mostly like adjectives and follow the nouns which they modify. In Biblical Hebrew, inflection of more sophisticated nouns is more common than in modern usage.

== Full pro-drop languages ==
Full pro-drop languages, also known as consistent NSLs, are languages that are characterized by rich subject agreement morphology where subjects are freely dropped under the appropriate discourse conditions. In some contexts, pro-drop in these languages is mandatory and also occurs in contexts in which pro-drop cannot happen for partial pro-drop languages. The following languages exhibit full pro-drop in their own distinct ways.

=== Hindi ===
South Asian languages such as Hindi, in general, have the ability to pro-drop any and all arguments. Hindi is a split-ergative language and when the subject of the sentence is in the ergative case (also when the sentence involves the infinitive participle, which requires the subject to be in the dative case), the verb of the sentence agrees in gender and number with the object of the sentence, hence making it possible to drop the object since it can be contextually inferred from the gender of the verb.

In the example below, the subject is in the ergative case and the verb agrees in number and gender with the direct object.

तुमने {नाद्या को} खाना दिया?
tumne {nādyā ko} khānā diyā?
you.ERG nadya.DAT.FEM food.NOM.MASC give.PFV.PTCP.MASC.SG
"Did you give the food to Nadya?"

हाँ दे दिया।
hā̃ de diyā.
yes give give.PFV.PTCP.MASC.SG
"yes, (I) gave (her food)."

In the example below, the subject is in the dative case and the verb agrees in number and gender with the direct object.

तुम्हें खानी हैं ये चीज़ें?
tumhẽ khānī ha͠i ye chīzẽ?
you.DAT eat.INF.PTCP.FEM.PL be.3PL these.NOM.PL things.NOM.FEM.PL
"Do you want to eat these things?"

हाँ खानी हैं।
hā̃ khānī ha͠i.
yes eat.INF.PTCP.FEM.PL be.3PL
"yes, (I) want to."

In the example below, the subject is in the nominative case and the verb agrees in number, gender, and also in person with the subject.

चलोगी देखने फ़िल्म?
chalogī dekhne film?
go.2SG.FUT.FEM watch.INF.OBL film.FEM
"will (you.FEM) go watch a film (with me)?"

हाँ चलूँगी।
hā̃ chalū̃gī.
yes go.1SG.FUT.FEM
"yes, (I.FEM) will go."

=== Greek ===
Subject pronouns are usually omitted in Greek, but the verb is inflected for the person and number of the subject. Example:

Βλέπεις εκείνο το κούτσουρο; Θα ήταν καλό για τη φωτιά. Είναι τελείως ξερό.
see.2sg that the log? Would be.3sg good for the fire. be.pres.3sg completely dry
(You) see this log? (It) would be good for the fire. (It) is completely dry.

=== Romance languages ===
Like their parent Latin, most Romance languages (with the notable exception of French) are categorised as pro-drop as well, though generally only in the case of subject pronouns. Unlike in Japanese, however, the missing subject pronoun is not inferred strictly from pragmatics, but partially indicated by the morphology of the verb, which inflects for person and number of the subject. Spanish, Italian, Romanian, Catalan and Occitan can elide subject pronouns only (Portuguese sometimes elides object pronouns as well), and they often do so even when the referent has not been mentioned. This is helped by person/number inflection on the verb. The 3rd person singular and plural subject pronouns are often kept to denote and differentiate male and female subjects/genders.

==== Spanish ====
In Spanish, the verb is inflected for both person and number, thus expression of the pronoun is unnecessary because it is grammatically redundant. In the following example, the inflection on the verb ver, 'see', signals informal 2nd person singular, thus the pronoun is dropped. Similarly, from both the context and verbal morphology, the listener can infer that the second two utterances are referring to the log, so the speaker omits the pronoun that would appear in English as "it."

¿Ves este tronco? Sería bueno para la fogata. Está completamente seco.
See this log? {Would be} good for the campfire. Is completely dry
(Do) (you) see this log? (It) would be good for the campfire. (It) is completely dry.

Although Spanish is a predominantly pro-drop language, not all grammatical contexts allow for a null pronoun. There are some environments that require an overt pronoun. In contrast, there are also grammatical environments that require a null pronoun. According to the Real Academia Española, the expression or elision of the subject pronoun is not random. Rather there are contexts in which an overt pronoun is abnormal, but in other cases, the overt pronoun is possible or even required. Further, the examples below illustrate how overt pronouns in Spanish are not constrained by inflectional morphology. The pronoun nosotros can be either present or absent, depending on certain discourse conditions:

Salimos
left
“We left.”

Nosotros salimos.
We left
“We left.”

The third person pronouns (él, ella, ellos, ellas) in most contexts can only refer to persons. Therefore, when referring to things (that are not people) an explicit pronoun is usually disallowed.

Subject pronouns can be made explicit when used for a contrastive function or when the subject is the focus of the sentence. In the following example, the first person explicit pronoun is used to emphasize the subject. In the next sentence the explicit yo, stressed that the opinion is from the speaker and not from the second person or another person.

Yo creo que eso estuvo mal.
I think that that was wrong.

Subject pronouns can also be made explicit in order to clarify ambiguities that arise due to verb forms that are homophonous in the first person and third person. For example, in the past imperfect, conditional, and subjunctive, the verb forms are the same for first person singular and third person singular. In these situations, using the explicit pronoun yo (1st person singular) or él, ella (3rd person singular) clarifies who the subject is, since the verbal morphology is ambiguous.

==== Italian ====
Vedi questo tronchetto? Andrebbe bene per il fuoco. È completamente secco.
See this log? {Would go} well for the campfire. Is completely dry.
Do (you) see this log? (It) would be fit for the campfire. (It) is completely dry.

Italian further demonstrates full pro-drop by allowing for the possibility of a salient, referential, definite subject of finite clauses. With respect to the null subject parameter (NSP), this will be analyzed using the phrase 'S/he speaks Italian.'

Italian has a [+] value:

Parla italiano. (Italian, +NSP)

A non pro-drop language, such as English, has a [-] value for NSP and thus does not allow for that possibility:

*Speaks Italian. (English, -NSP)

==== Portuguese ====
Portuguese displays full pro-drop by allowing subjects of finite clauses to be phonetically null:

Chegaram.
arrived-3PL
‘They have arrived.’

Variations of Portuguese can differ with respect to their pro-drop features. While European Portuguese (EP) is a full pro-drop language, Brazilian Portuguese (BP) exhibits partial pro-drop. The two are compared below, respectively:

Examples of omitted subject:

Estás a ver este tronco? Seria bom para a fogueira. Secou completamente.
Are to see this log? {Would be} good for the campfire. Dried completely
(Do) (you) see this log? (It) would be good for the campfire. (It) has completely dried.

Está(s) vendo esse tronco? Seria bom pra fogueira. Secou completamente.
Are seeing this log? {Would be} good for-the campfire. Dried completely
(Do) (you) see this log? (It) would be good for the campfire. (It) has completely dried.

Omission of object pronouns is likewise possible when the referent is clear, especially in colloquial or informal language:

Acho que ele vai rejeitar a proposta, mas pode aceitar.
Think that he goes (to-)reject the proposal, but may accept.
(I) think he is going to turn down the proposal, but (he) may accept (it).

Ainda tem macarrão? Não, papai comeu.
Still {is there} pasta? No, daddy ate.
Is there pasta left? No, daddy ate (it).

The use of the object pronoun in these examples (aceitá-la, comeu-o) is the default everywhere but Brazil.

Ela me procurou ontem e não achou.
She me sought yesterday and not found.
She looked for me yesterday and didn't find (me).

Here não me achou would also be possible.

A: Eu te amo; você também me ama? B: Amo, sim.
A‍: I you love; you too me love? B‍: Love-1sg, yes.
A: I love you; do you love me too? B: I do.

Omission of the object pronoun is possible even when its referent has not been explicitly mentioned, so long as it can be inferred. The next example might be heard at a store; the referent (a dress) is clear to the interlocutor. In both Brazilian and European Portuguese the pronoun is omitted.

Viu que bonito? Não gosta? Pode comprar?
Saw how beautiful? Don't like? Can buy?

Viste que bonito? Não gostas? Podes comprar?
Saw how beautiful? Don't like? Can buy?
Have you seen how beautiful it is? Do you like it? Can you buy it?

==== Pro-drop with locative and partitive ====
Modern Spanish and Portuguese are also notable amongst Romance languages because they have no specific pronouns for circumstantial complements (arguments denoting circumstance, consequence, place or manner, modifying the verb but not directly involved in the action) or partitives (words or phrases denoting a quantity of something). However, both languages had them during the Middle Ages: Portuguese hi and ende.

Compare the following examples in which Spanish, Portuguese, Galician, and Romanian have null pronouns for place and partitives, but Catalan, French, Occitan, and Italian have overt pronouns for place and partitive.

Pro-drop with locative and partitive: Romance
language	locative		partitive	
Spanish		¡Voy!		Tengo cuatro.
Portuguese		Vou!		Tenho quatro.
Galician		Vou!		Teño catro.
Romanian		Mă duc!		Am patru.
Catalan	Hi	vaig!	En	tinc quatre.
French	J'y	vais !	J'en	ai quatre.
Occitan	I	vau!	N'	ai quatre.
Italian	Ci	vado!	Ne	ho quattro.
	'I'm going [there]!'		'I have four (of them).'	

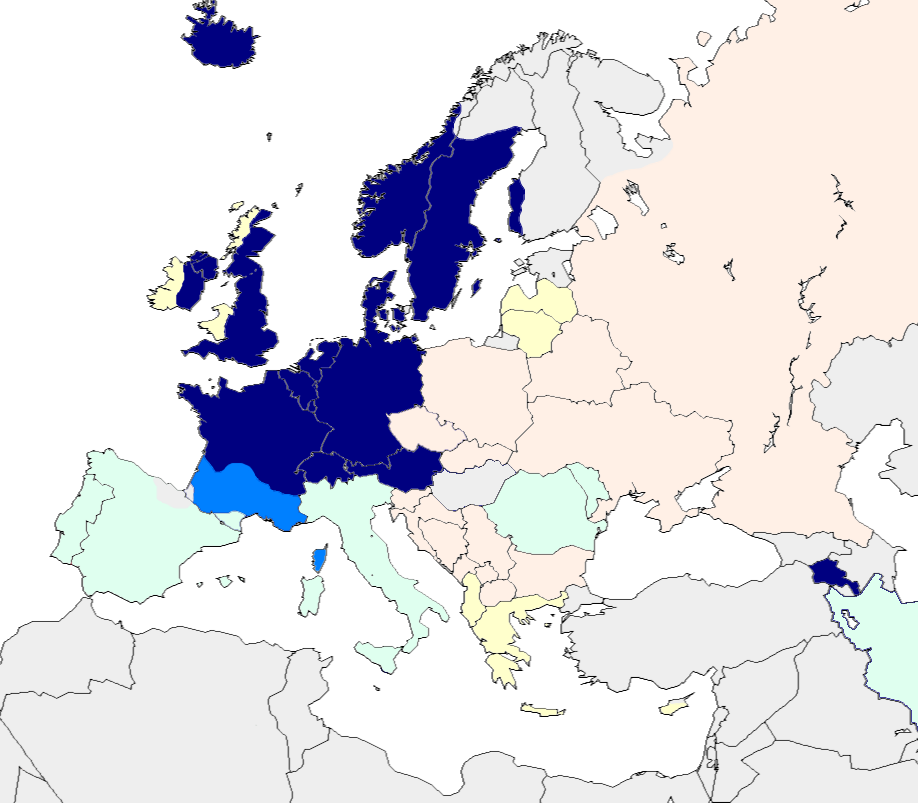
Languages in Europe Non-pro-drop languages Pro-drop being displaced by a non-pro-drop language

== Other examples ==
=== Arabic ===
Arabic is considered a null-subject language, as demonstrated by the following example:

sāʻid ghayrak, yusāʻiduk.
{help.PRES.3SG you} other, {help.PST.3SG you}
Help another, (he) helps you.

=== Turkish ===
Sen-i gör-dü-m
2SG-ACC see-PAST-1SG
(I) saw you.

The subject "I" above is easily inferable as the verb gör-mek "to see" is conjugated in the first person simple past tense form. The object is indicated by the pronoun seni in this case. Strictly speaking, pronominal objects are generally explicitly indicated, although frequently possessive suffixes indicate the equivalent of an object in English, as in the following sentence.

Gel-diğ-im-i gör-dü-n mü?
come-NMLZ-POSS.1SG-ACC see-PAST-2SG Q
Did you see me coming?

In this sentence, the object of the verb is actually the action of coming performed by the speaker (geldiğimi "my coming"), but the object in the English sentence, "me", is indicated here by the possessive suffix -im "my" on the nominalised verb. Both pronouns can be explicitly indicated in the sentence for purposes of emphasis, as follows:

Sen ben-im gel-diğ-im-i gör-dü-n mü?
2SG 1SG-POSS come-"ing"-POSS.1SG-ACC see-PAST-2SG Q
Did you see me coming?

=== Swahili ===
In Swahili, both subject and object pronouns can be omitted as they are indicated by verbal prefixes.

Ni- -ta- -ku- -saidia.
SUBJ.1SG- -FUT- -OBJ.2SG- -help
(I) will help (you).

=== English ===
English is not a pro-drop language, but subject pronouns are almost always dropped in imperative sentences (e.g., Come here! Do tell! Eat your vegetables!), with the subject "you" understood or communicated non-verbally.

In informal speech, the pronominal subject is sometimes dropped. The ellipsis has been called "conversational deletion" and "left-edge deletion", and is common in informal spoken English as well as certain registers of written English, notably diaries. Most commonly, it is the first person singular subject which is dropped.

Some other words, especially copulas and auxiliaries, can also be dropped.

- [Have you] ever been there?
- [I'm] going shopping. [Do you] want to come?
- [I] haven't been there yet. [I'm] going later.
- Seen on signs: [I am/We are] out to lunch; [I/we shall be] back at 1:00 [P.M].
- What do you think [of it]? – I like [it]! (the latter only in some dialects and registers)
- [Do you] want a piece of cake?
- [You] are not! – [I] am too! This pattern is also common with other tenses (e.g., were, will) and verbs (e.g., do/did, have/had).

In speech, when pronouns are not dropped, they are more often reduced than other words in an utterance.

Relative pronouns, provided they are not the subject, are often dropped in short restrictive clauses: That's the man [who(m)] I saw.

The dropping of pronouns is generally restricted to very informal speech and certain fixed expressions, and the rules for their use are complex and vary among dialects and registers. A noted instance was the "lived the dream" section of George H. W. Bush's speech at the 1988 Republican National Convention.

Those were exciting days. We lived in a little shotgun house, one room for the three of us. [I] Worked in the oil business and then started my own.

And in time, we had six children. [We] Moved from the shotgun to a duplex apartment to a house and lived the dream—high-school football on Friday night, Little League, neighborhood barbecue.

=== German ===
Colloquial and dialectal German, unlike the standard language, are also partially pro-drop and typically allow deletion of the subject pronoun only in main clauses without inversion. German has personal inflections of verbs, which makes pro-drop sentences easier to understand.

=== South Asia ===
In the South Asian linguistic area, along with few specialized Indo-Aryan languages like Marathi, Kashmiri are pro-drop; many Tibeto-Burman languages and most Munda languages (except Korku) are generally pro-drop, since both subjects and objects of intransitive and transitive verbs are indexed into the verb itself.

Limbu (Kiranti, Sino-Tibetan):

sɛʔr-u-ŋ nɛtt-u-ŋ
kill-3SG.OBJ-1.SG.SUBJ.PST AUX-3SG.OBJ-1.SG.SUBJ.PST
'I was about to kill him'

Juang (South Munda, Austroasiatic):

mɛ-dʒɔ-ki-ɲ
2SG.SUBJ-see-PRES.TR-1SG.OBJ
'You see me'

== Other language families and linguistic regions ==
Among the Indo-European and Dravidian languages of India, pro-drop is the general rule though many Dravidian languages do not have overt verbal markers to indicate pronominal subjects. Mongolic languages are similar in this respect to Dravidian languages, and all Paleosiberian languages are rigidly pro-drop.

Outside of northern Europe, most Niger–Congo languages, Khoisan languages of Southern Africa and Austronesian languages of the Western Pacific, pro-drop is the usual pattern in almost all linguistic regions of the world. In many non-pro-drop Niger–Congo or Austronesian languages, like Igbo, Samoan and Fijian, however, subject pronouns do not occur in the same position as a nominal subject and are obligatory even when the latter occurs. In more easterly Austronesian languages, like Rapa Nui and Hawaiian, subject pronouns are often omitted even though no other subject morphemes exist. Pama–Nyungan languages of Australia also typically omit subject pronouns even when there is no explicit expression of the subject.

Many Pama–Nyungan languages, however, have clitics, which often attach to nonverbal hosts to express subjects. The other languages of Northwestern Australia are all pro-drop, for all classes of pronoun. Also, Papuan languages of New Guinea and Nilo-Saharan languages of East Africa are pro-drop.

Among the indigenous languages of the Americas, pro-drop is almost universal, as would be expected from the generally polysynthetic and head-marking character of the languages. That generally allows eliding of all object pronouns as well as subject ones. Indeed, most reports on Native American languages show that even the emphatic use of pronouns is exceptionally rare. Only a few Native American languages, mostly language isolates (Haida, Trumai, Wappo) and the Oto-Manguean family are known for normally using subject pronouns.

Yahgan, an extinct language isolate from Tierra del Fuego, had no pro-drop when it was still spoken widely in the late 19th century, when it was first described grammatically and had texts translated from English and other languages (three biblical New Testament texts: Luke, John, and Acts of the Apostles). In fact, emphatic pronouns and cross-reference pronouns on the verb commonly appeared together.

=== Pragmatic inference ===
Classical Chinese exhibits extensive dropping not only of pronouns but also of any terms (subjects, verbs, objects, etc.) that are pragmatically inferable, which gives a very compact character to the language. Note, however, that Classical Chinese was a written language, and such word dropping is not necessarily representative of the spoken language or even of the same linguistic phenomenon.

== See also ==
- Null morpheme – Morpheme with no phonetic form
- Null-subject language – Class of language where a sentence subject is not required (NSL)
- Null subject parameter – Parameter that determines whether the subject can be dropped from a sentence (NSP) – The parameter which determines if languages are pro-drop, marking them as either positive (+) or negative (-) NSP.
- Zero copula – Lacking or omission of a "to be" verb, common in some languages and stylistic in others; many languages such as Arabic and Hebrew lack a "to be" verb which is implicit in the subject.
- Pronoun avoidance – Phenomenon in some spoken languages; the use of kinship terms, titles and other complex nominal expressions instead of personal pronouns
