= Northern Yukian language =

Extinct language of California

Northern Yukian
- Ukomnoʼm
- Native to: California, United States
- Region: Eel River area
- Ethnicity: Yuki people
- Extinct: 1983, with the death of Arthur Anderson
- Revival: 21st century
- Language family: Yuki–Wappo: Northern Yukian
- Dialects: Huchnom; Round Valley; Coast

Language codes
- ISO 639-3: yuk
- Glottolog: yuki1243
- Yuki is classified as Extinct by the UNESCO Atlas of the World's Languages in Danger.

Northern Yukian, also known as Ukomnoʼm, is an extinct language of California, formerly spoken by the Yuki people. The Yuki are the original inhabitants of the Eel River area and the Round Valley Reservation of northern California. Yuki ceased to be used as an everyday language in the early 20th century and its last native speaker, Arthur Anderson, died in 1983. Northern Yukian is generally thought to be distantly related to the Wappo language.

Revitalization efforts are currently underway, and the language is taught at the grade-school level (alongside Wailaki) at the Round Valley Reservation.

== Classification ==
Northern Yukian consisted of three dialects, from east to west: Round Valley Yuki, Huchnom (Clear Lake Yuki) and Coast Yuki. These were at least partially mutually intelligible, but are sometimes counted as distinct languages.

These languages are categorized as Northern Yukian within the Yuki–Wappo (Yukian) family, which also includes the distant Wappo language. It is thought that the ancestor of the Yukian languages diverged from Wappo around 1500 bce.

The three Northern Yukian languages diverged from each other over the last one thousand years, while dialectal variations in Wappo are even more recent. The most likely catalyst or, at least, influence on the separation of Northern Yukian and Wappo was the expansion of the Pomo, leading to pomoization of the Wappo language and physical separation between the Yuki and the Wappo tribes.

== Phonology ==
Consonants
		Bilabial	Dental	Alveolar	Postalveolar	Palatal	Velar	Glottal
Stop	Plain	p	t̪	t̺			k	ʔ
Stop	Ejective	pʼ	t̪ʼ	t̺ʼ			kʼ	
Affricate	Plain				t͡ʃ			
Affricate	Ejective				t͡ʃʼ			
Fricative	Plain			s	ʃ			h
Fricative	Ejective			sʼ				
Nasal	Plain	m		n				
Nasal	Glottal	ˀm		ˀn				
Approximant	Plain	w		l		j		
Approximant	Glottal	ˀw		ˀl		ˀj		

An alveolar stop /t/ is an apico-alveolar stop articulated as [t̺].

Vowels
	Front		Central		Back	
	short	long	short	long	short	long
Close	i	iː			u	uː
Mid	e	eː	ə̃		o	oː
Open			a	aː		

== Grammar ==
An extensive reference grammar of the Yuki variety was published in 2016 and is based primarily on the texts and other notes recorded by Alfred L. Kroeber from Yuki speaker Ralph Moore in the first decade of the 20th century as well as elicited material recorded from other speakers later in the 20th century. This grammar also contains sketches of Huchnom and Coast Yuki based on the notes of Sydney Lamb and John Peabody Harrington, respectively.

== Vocabulary ==
Yuki has an octal (base-8) counting system, as the Yuki keep count by using the four spaces between their fingers rather than the fingers themselves. Yuki also has an extensive vocabulary for the plants of Mendocino County, California.
