= Wappo traditional narratives =

Native Californian narratives

Wappo traditional narratives include myths, legends, tales, and oral histories preserved by the Wappo people of the North Coast Ranges of northeastern California.

Wappo oral literature was classed with that of central California, but it also showed influences from the Pacific Northwest region.

== See also ==
- Traditional narratives (Native California).)

== Sources for Wappo narratives ==
- Kroeber, Henriette R. 1908. "Wappo Myths". Journal of American Folklore 21:321-323.
- Loeb, Edwin M. 1932. "The Western Kuksu Cult". University of California Publications in American Archaeology and Ethnology 33:1-137. Berkeley. (Note on Wappo mythology, pp. 107–108.)
- Powers, Stephen. 1877. Tribes of California. Contributions to North American Ethnology, vol. 3. Government Printing Office, Washington, D.C. Reprinted with an introduction by Robert F. Heizer in 1976, University of California Press, Berkeley. (Two narratives, pp. 200–202.)
- Radin, Paul. 1924. "Wappo Texts: First Series". University of California Publications in American Archaeology and Ethnology 19:1-147. Berkeley. (Myths, including Bear and Fawns, collected from Jim Tripo and Joe McCloud in 1918, pp. 45–147.)
- Radin, Paul. 1929. "A Grammar of the Wappo Language". University of California Publications in American Archaeology and Ethnology 27:1-194. Berkeley. (One myth, pp. 159–160.)
- Sawyer, Jesse O., Jr., and Laura Fish. 1977. "Bear Woman and Her Children (Wappo)". In Northern Californian Texts, edited by Victor Golla and Shirley Silver, pp. 105–113. International Journal of American Linguistics Native American Texts Series No. 2(2). University of Chicago Press.
