= Dry Creek Rancheria Band of Pomo Indians =

Total population
- approximately 800–1,000

Regions with significant populations
- United States (California)

Languages
- English, Pomoan languages, Southern Pomo, Wappo

Related ethnic groups
- other Pomo people

The Dry Creek Rancheria Band of Pomo Indians is a federally recognized tribe of Pomo people, an Indigenous people of California. The tribe has a reservation near Geyserville, California, in Sonoma County, where it operates the River Rock Casino Resort.

== History ==
The Pomo people are Indigenous to northern California and formed about 21 autonomous communities, speaking seven Pomoan languages. The Dry Creek Band are Southern Pomo, descended from the Mihilakawna and Makahmo bands. Sustained European contact began with the Russian fur trappers in the 18th century. They were followed in the 19th century by American gold prospectors and settlers, who quickly outnumbered the native populations.

In 1915, the federal government purchased and held in fee, land for the "Dry Creek Rancheria", Dry Creek Valley being the name of the area, for use by both the "Dry Creek" Indians and the Geyserville Indians. The Dry Creek area, in what is now the Alexander Valley, was and still is prime agricultural land. The purchase was part of the U.S. rancheria program, which began in 1893 and ended around 1922, when 58 tracts of land were purchased in California on which "homeless" Indians could live rent- and tax-free. Most of the land was selected and purchased by Special Indian Agent John Terrell, who took much care in finding good plots of land. Adults were to be given assigned plots of land, but in actuality, most Indians simply moved onto the rancherias with no assignments. No one was ever forced to live on a rancheria.

The tribe was reorganized via Articles of Association adopted on September 13, 1972. The Articles were approved by the Secretary of the Interior on April 16, 1973.

The tribe's name was officially changed from "Dry Creek Rancheria" to "Dry Creek Rancheria Band of Pomo Indians".

In 2002, the tribe established River Rock Casino on its reservation near Geyserville. The casino includes the Quail Run Restaurant, the Oak Bar, and Lounge 128.

== Reservation and lands ==
The tribe's reservation is the Dry Creek Rancheria, situated near the town of Geyserville in Sonoma County, California. The reservation has an area of 75 acres (300,000 m^{2}) – a remnant of the 86,400 acres (350 km^{2}) the tribe once owned. Much of the original reservation lands were inundated by the waters of Lake Sonoma after the construction of the Warm Springs Dam.

The tribe also owns 277 acres (1.12 km^{2}) south of Petaluma, for which it applied to be taken into federal trust, before suspending its application. In October 2013, the tribe added a 60-room hotel to its plan for the land, but the tribe's leader continued to insist that there were no plans for a casino.

The Dry Creek Pomo conduct business out of Geyserville and Healdsburg, California.

== Membership and leadership ==
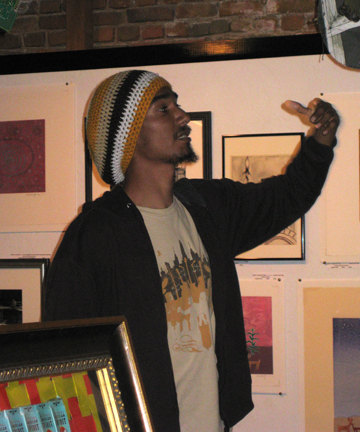
Ras K'Dee, Dry Creek Pomo singer and editor of SNAG Magazine, performing in Point Arena, California

In 2001 the tribe had a Coup d'état. Members of the tribe, without notice, attempted to recall and replace the government (Tribal Board of Directors). The tribe resolved the problem internally (privately). However, appeals were made to the BIA that have made the information public.

On May 22, 2010 the tribe had a Coup d'état. Two special meetings were called - one by the Chairman (Harvey Hopkins) and one by two other Board members - to attempt recall of three Board members. No recall was successful but by a "force of numbers" the Chairman was removed, or perhaps removed himself (abdicated) to allow a "cooling off" or "de-escalation" period before "normal" operations could resume later in the summer.

In the fall of 2010 the government had re-assembled and worked to hold regular Board elections. The 2010–2012 Board is: Harvey Hopkins, Chairman (retained); Salvina Norris, Vice-Chair (replaced Gus Pina); Margie Rojes, Secretary/Treasurer (replaced Salvina Norris); Marina Nojima (retained) and Jim Silva (replaced Gabe Nevarez), Members at Large.

The current population of the Dry Creek Pomo is a matter of some controversy. At the beginning of 2009, there were approximately 970 enrolled members. That year, tribal leadership proposed to disenroll members (between 70–143, depending on accounts), resulting in protests in March 2009. In March 2014, the tribe notified another 75 members that they faced expulsion.

Chris Wright is the elected Chairman of the Board of Directors, and has served as such since 2014 (replacing Harvey Hopkins, Chairman 2004–2014). The other members of the Tribal Board of Directors are Betty Arterberry (Vice-Chairman), Margie Rojes (Secretary/Treasurer), Jim Silva (Member at Large) and Tieraney Giron (Member at Large).
