= Yuki traditional narratives =

Yuki traditional narratives include myths, legends, tales, and oral histories preserved by the Yuki people of the upper Eel River area of northwestern California.

Yuki oral literature is primarily affiliated with that of central California, although there are also influences from the Northwest Coast region. They clearly belong to the central California tradition. (See also Traditional narratives (Native California).)

== On-line examples of Yuki narratives ==
- "The Northern California Indians" by Stephen Powers (1872)
- "Yuka Legends" by A. G. Fassin (1884)
- "Indian Myths of South Central California" by Alfred L. Kroeber (1907)
- ''The North American Indian'' by Edward S. Curtis (1924)

== Sources for Yuki narratives ==
- Curtis, Edward S. 1907–1930. The North American Indian. 20 vols. Plimpton Press, Norwood, Massachusetts. (Two myths, including Theft of Fire, vol. 14, pp. 169–170.)
- Fassin, A. G. 1884. "Yuka Legends". Overland Monthly 3:651-658.
- Gifford, Edward Winslow. 1937. "Coast Yuki Myths". Journal of American Folklore 50:115-172. (Myths, including Theft of Fire, collected from Tony Bell in 1926 and Tom Bell in 1929.)
- Gifford, Edward Winslow, and Gwendoline Harris Block. 1930. California Indian Nights. Arthur H. Clark, Glendale, California. (One previously published narrative, p. 82.)
- Goldschmidt, Walter, George Foster, and Frank Essene. 1939. "War Stories from Two Enemy Tribes". Journal of American Folklore 52:141-154. (Reprinted in The California Indians: A Source Book, edited by R. F. Heizer and M. A. Whipple, pp. 445–458, 2nd ed., 1971, University of California Press, Berkeley. (Four Yuki narratives about warfare with the Nomlaki, compared with Nomlaki accounts; collected in 1935–1937.)
- Kroeber, A. L. 1907. "Indian Myths of South Central California". University of California Publications in American Archaeology and Ethnology 4:167-250. Berkeley. (Myths, including Theft of Fire, pp. 183–186.)
- Kroeber, A. L. 1911. "The Languages of the Coast of California North of San Francisco". University of California Publications in American Archaeology and Ethnology 9:273-435. Berkeley. (Includes a Yuki myth, pp. 375–377.)
- Kroeber, A. L. 1925. Handbook of the Indians of California. Bureau of American Ethnology Bulletin No. 78. Washington, D.C. (Several narratives, including Creation myth and accounts of wars, p. 152, 156–158, 206–207, 216.)
- Kroeber, A. L. 1932. "Yuki Myths". Anthropos 27:905-939.
- Margolin, Malcolm. 1993. The Way We Lived: California Indian Stories, Songs, and Reminiscences. First edition 1981. Heyday Books, Berkeley, California. (Two myths, pp. 46–47, 91–92, from Gifford 1937.)
- Powers, Stephen. 1877. Tribes of California. Contributions to North American Ethnology, vol. 3. Government Printing Office, Washington, D.C. Reprinted with an introduction by Robert F. Heizer in 1976, University of California Press, Berkeley. (Two narratives, pp. 144–145.)
