= Null subject parameter =

Parameter that determines whether the subject can be dropped from a sentence

The pro-drop parameter, or null subject parameter, is the parameter that determines whether or not a language is pro-drop. A positive setting of the parameter allows an empty pro-element to be identified by its governor, which is the case in pro-drop languages.

A term used in government-binding theory for a specification of the types of variation that a principle of grammar manifests among different languages. It is suggested that there are no rules of grammar in the traditional sense, but only principles that can take a slightly different form in different languages. For example, a head parameter specifies the positions of heads within phrases (e.g. head-first in English, head-last in Japanese). The adjacency parameter of case theory specifies whether case assigners must be adjacent to their noun phrases (e.g. to the left in English, to the right in Chinese). The pro-drop (or ‘null subject’) parameter determines whether the subject of a clause can be suppressed. Determining the parametric values for given languages is known as parameter-setting. The overall approach has been called the principles and parameters theory (PPT) of universal grammar, and has since come to be applied outside of syntactic contexts, notably in characterizing phonological relations. Later versions of metrical phonology, for example, recognize a series of parameters governing the way metrical feet should be represented such as quantity, sensitivity and directionality.

In universal grammar, a parameter that determines whether the subject in declarative sentences may be deleted. Parameters vary in different languages within certain defined limits. Languages such as Italian and Arabic can have subject-less declarative sentences (Italian parla ‘he/she speaks/talks’) and are referred to as pro-drop languages. However, languages such as English, French and German do not typically omit the subject in declarative sentences and are referred to as non-pro-drop languages:

	Subject	Verb	
Italian	(lui)	parla	pro-drop
Arabic	(huwa)	yatakalamu	pro-drop
English	he	speaks	non-pro-drop
French	il	parle	non-pro-drop
German	er	spricht	non-pro-drop

The term pro-drop is used because in the d-structure of the grammar, the empty subject position is filled by the element pro, e.g. pro parla

The pro-drop parameter and other parameters of universal grammar have attracted the interest of researchers working in the fields of child language acquisition and language teaching. For example, the question has been raised: How do children ‘set’ a UG parameter to fit their particular language? Researchers in second language acquisition have investigated what happens if a parameter in the speaker's native language is different from that of their target language, making it necessary to ‘reset’ the parameter. This would happen, for example, in the acquisition of Spanish (a pro-drop language) by speakers of non-pro-drop languages such as English and French.

In government-binding theory, any of the various putative universal statements permits a specified degree of variation within languages. The idea is that a language selects just one of the small number of choices that are permitted by the theory of grammar. Examples include the Head Parameter, the Adjacency Parameter and the Pro-Drop Parameter.

In the theory of universal grammar (UG) and language acquisition, parameters specify certain options that are not specified in UG. The values of parameters are not genetically fixed. Thus, language acquisition becomes a process of parameter setting. Linguistic diversity is characterized in terms of the values of parameters; for example, the null subject parameter. Certain languages such as Italian and Spanish may have sentences with no overt subject, but other languages such as English must have an overt subject even if it is nonreferential (dummy subject). Parameter theory, thus, provides an explanation for systematic syntactic variation between languages and imposes restrictions on the number of choices that the language learner must make.

== See also ==
- Pro-sentence – Linguistic sentence with null subject
