= Dry Creek Rancheria =

Native American reservation in California

Coordinates: 38°42′09″N 122°51′23″W

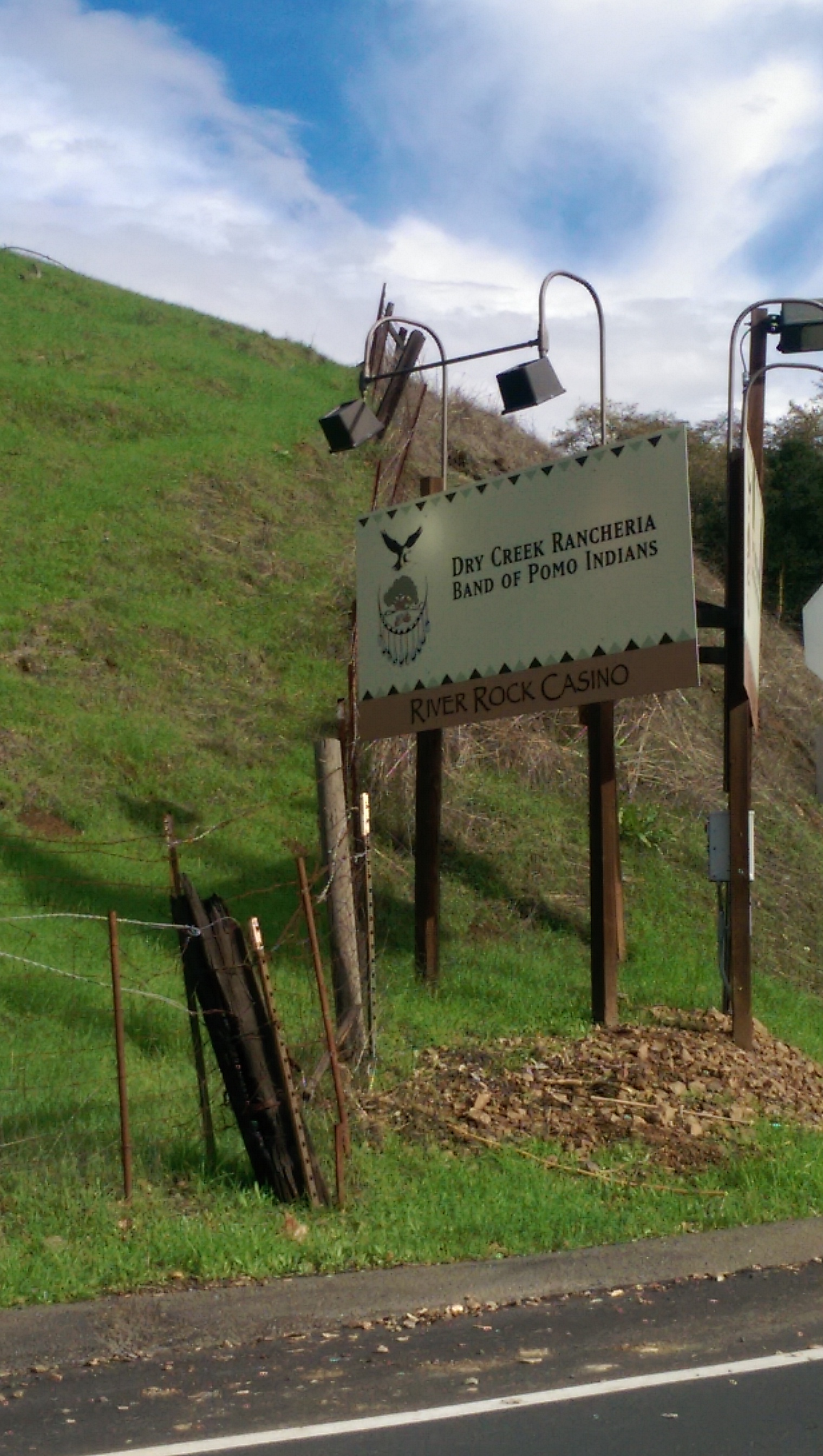
Entrance to the Dry Creek Rancheria & River Rock Casino

Location of Dry Creek Rancheria

The Dry Creek Rancheria is the land base (reservation) of the Dry Creek Rancheria Band of Pomo Indians. The reservation consists today of approximately 75 acres (300,000 m^{2}) near the Russian River, in Sonoma County, approximately 75 miles (121 km) north of San Francisco, California. It is situated about 3 miles southeast of Geyserville.

The rancheria was created in 1915 for the Mahilakawna, also known as the Dry Creek Pomo, and the Western Wappo people from present-day Dry Creek Valley and Alexander Valley.
