= Yuki–Wappo languages =

Family of Native American languages

Yuki–Wappo
- Yukian
- Geographic distribution: California
- Extinct: 1990, with the death of Laura Somersal (Wappo)
- Linguistic classification: One of the world's primary language families
- Subdivisions: Yuki; Wappo

Language codes
- Glottolog: yuki1242
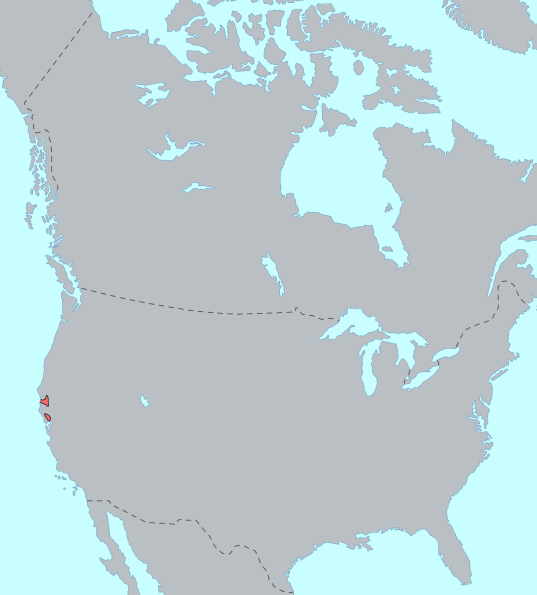
- Pre-contact distribution of Yuki–Wappo languages

The Yuki–Wappo or Yukian languages are a small extinct language family of western California consisting of two distantly related languages.

The Yukian languages may be, along with Chumashan and perhaps languages of southern Baja such as Waikuri, one of the oldest language families established in California, before the arrival of speakers of Penutian, Uto-Aztecan, and perhaps even Hokan languages. All three are spoken in areas with long-established populations of a distinct physical type.

== Family division ==
The family consists of

- Yuki–Wappo
  - † Yuki
  - † Wappo

Yuki consisted of three dialects: Yuki, Coast Yuki, and Huchnom. Wappo consisted of four dialects spoken in the Napa Valley, with a fifth dialect spoken in an enclave on Clear Lake.

Wappo and Yuki are quite divergent grammatically and lexically (Goddard 1996: 83), which has led to contested theories about their relationship. Additionally, the Wappo and Yuki people were quite distinct culturally and even in physical type (Goddard 1996: 83). The Yuki–Wappo languages appear to belong to the very earliest strata of languages in California, even predating Hokan (Goddard 1996: 84). Yuki is associated with the Mendocino Complex around Clear Lake (3000 BCE), while Wappo of the Napa Valley is associated with the St. Helena Aspect of the Augustine Pattern. Proto-Yukian peoples may be of the Post Pattern (9000 BCE).

Some evidence suggests the two languages separated around 2000–1000 BCE. Wappo speakers may have separated from Yuki due to migrations of Pomoan peoples. Alternatively, the Yuki and Wappo may have entered Northern California as distinct communities that settled in different areas, or Wappo speakers may have migrated south from the Yuki–Wappo heartland in the upper reaches of the Eel River.

The Wappo migration to Alexander Valley in the 19th century was due to war with the Southern Pomo.

== Genetic relations ==
The relationship between Yuki and Wappo was contested by Jesse Sawyer who believes that the similarities are due to linguistic borrowing and shared areal features. However, William Elmendorf has presented some persuasive evidence in favor of the relationship, noting that they are as close as two branches of Indo-European. Campbell (1997) considers Elmendorf's evidence to be conclusive. Mithun (1999) reports that the relationship remains open to question, Golla (2011) that it is securely demonstrated.

Yuki–Wappo has been linked to a number of hypothetical relationships:

- under Penutian including a connection to Yokutsan and also to a California Penutian sub-group
- under Hokan (including under Edward Sapir's Hokan–Siouan)
- connected to Siouan
- in Morris Swadesh's Hokogian family with Hokan, Muskogean, and other Gulf languages, grouped together with Coahuiltecan and Chitimacha (and not with Hokan, pace Sapir)

To date, none of these proposals have been successfully demonstrated.

== Bibliography ==
- Campbell, Lyle. (1997). American Indian languages: The historical linguistics of Native America. New York: Oxford University Press. ISBN 0-19-509427-1.
- Goddard, Ives (Ed.). (1996). Languages. Handbook of North American Indians (W. C. Sturtevant, General Ed.) (Vol. 17). Washington, D. C.: Smithsonian Institution. ISBN 0-16-048774-9.
- Golla, Victor. (2011). California Indian Languages. Berkeley: University of California Press. ISBN 978-0-5202-6667-4
- Heizer, Robert F. (Ed.). (1978). California. Handbook of North American Indians (W. C. Sturtevant, General Ed.) (Vol. 8). Washington, D. C.: Smithsonian Institution.
- Mithun, Marianne. (1999). The languages of Native North America. Cambridge: Cambridge University Press. ISBN 0-521-23228-7 (hbk); ISBN 0-521-29875-X.
