= Wappo language =

Extinct language of North America

Wappo
- Micewal
- Native to: United States
- Region: Alexander Valley, California
- Ethnicity: Wappo people
- Extinct: July 30, 1990, with the death of Laura Fish Somersal few rememberers (2011)
- Language family: Yuki–Wappo: Wappo

Language codes
- ISO 639-3: wao
- Glottolog: wapp1239
- ELP: Wappo
- Distribution of Wappo

- Wappo is classified as Extinct by the UNESCO Atlas of the World's Languages in Danger.

Wappo is an extinct language that was spoken by the Wappo tribe, Native Americans who lived in what is now known as the Alexander Valley north of San Francisco. The last fluent speaker, Laura Fish Somersal, died in 1990. The loss of this language is attributed to a preference for English in schools and workplaces. Wappo is generally believed to be distantly related to the Yuki language. It is distinguished by influence of the nearby Pomoan languages.

According to Somersal, the English name for the people and language is derived from the Spanish word guapo, meaning "handsome" or "brave". The people called themselves Micewal. The Pomoan exonym, or name for them, was Ashochimi ("northerners").

Paul Radin published the first texts on Wappo grammar in the 1920s. Jesse O. Sawyer published English–Wappo Vocabulary in 1965 and continued to study Wappo grammar throughout his life. Other linguists who have contributed to the study of Wappo include William E. Elmendorf, Alice Shepherd, Sandra Thompson, Joseph Sung-Yul Park, and Charles N. Li.

As of the 21st century, there are some plans and efforts at language revival.

== Phonology ==
=== Vowels ===
Wappo has five vowel qualities, but the literature is inconsistent as to whether a length distinction exists. In his Wappo lexicon, Sawyer transcribes long vowels, but Thompson et al., who worked with the same speaker, report that they did not hear any long vowels.

According to Radin, the following diphthongs occur in Wappo: /ao/, /ai/, /ɛo/, /ɛi/, /ɛu/, /ei/, /ɔi/, /iɛ/, and /ui/.

	Front	Back
High	i	u
Mid	e	o
Low	a	

=== Consonants ===
The transcription style (bolded symbols below) is based on Sawyer's work with Somersal, with further interpretation by Thompson, Park and Li. Thompson et al. propose that Wappo has three types of stops: plain, aspirated and glottalized. Stops plus /h/ are therefore treated as single aspirated stops. Sawyer notes that /f/, /d/, /g/, /r/ and /rʼ/ are used for Spanish borrowings.

		Labial	Dental	Alveolar	Palatal	Velar	Glottal
Plosive	voiceless	**p** [p]	**t** [t̻]	**ṭ** [t̺]		**k** [k]	**ʔ** [ʔ]
Plosive	aspirated	**pʰ** [pʰ]	**tʰ** [t̻ʰ]	**ṭʰ** [t̺ʰ]		**kʰ** [kʰ]	
Plosive	glottalized	**pʼ** [pʼ]	**tʼ** [t̻ʼ]	**ṭʼ** [t̺ʼ]		**kʼ** [kʼ]	
Affricate	voiceless			**c** [t͡s]	**č** [t͡ʃ]		
Affricate	aspirated			**ch** [t͡sʰ]	**čh** [t͡ʃʰ]		
Affricate	glottalized			**cʼ** [t͡sʼ]	**čʼ** [t͡ʃʼ]		
Fricative	voiceless			**s** [s]	**š** [ʃ]		**h** [h]
Nasal	plain	**m** [m]		**n** [n]			
Nasal	glottalized	**mʼ** [mʼ]		**nʼ** [nʼ]			
Approximant	plain	**w** [w]		**l** [l]	**y** [j]		
Approximant	glottalized	**wʼ** [wʼ]		**lʼ** [lʼ]	**yʼ** [jʼ]		

=== Stress and tone ===
Wappo word stress is predictable, in that the first syllable of the word stem is stressed. In the examples below, the accent marks stress.

- méhwa "wild grape vine"
- kálkuʔ "greyhound"

Wappo does not make distinctions in tone.

=== Phonological processes ===
- Glottal stops are inserted word-initially in words that would otherwise begin with a vowel.
- If a word stem ends in a vowel and a suffix immediately following the stem begins with a vowel, one of those vowels is elided. In most cases, the vowel at the beginning of the suffix is deleted. For example, čoči-iʔ, which is the root "weave" plus the durative suffix, has the surface representation of čočiʔ.

== Morphology ==
=== Nouns ===
Nouns can be divided into human and non-human classes, which is relevant for pluralization. Human nouns are consistently inflected for plurality, but non-human nouns do not have to be inflected for plurality, even when their reference is in fact plural. For example, onoʔšiʔ-te "Indians" has the plural suffix -te, but mansanaʔi "apples" lacks the suffix.

=== Verbs ===
Wappo also has rich inflectional and derivational morphology in its verb phrases. There are five categories of tense or aspect: habitual/progressive, stative, past, inchoative and future. Each verb root takes at least two forms to which suffixes are added. The form used depends on the tense. The forms themselves are determined by the verb's semantic class, which is basically determined by the habitual/progressive suffix used. Specific suffixes result in changes to the verb stem, for example, -lik- is added to the root of verbs occurring with the rare imperative suffix -laʔ. This occurs in the imperative for "sleep", in which the stem is changed from hinto- to hintolik-. Epenthesis also occurs in certain situations, depending on the form of the root and the suffix added.

Thompson et al. provide the following examples of tense/aspect categories. The relevant forms are bolded, and all of the forms follow Sawyer's transcription style.

Category	Suffix(es)	Wappo example	English translation
Habitual/progressive	13 different forms exist	ah yekhe **k'el-iʔ**	"I eat acorn mush"
Stative	-khiʔ	i-meʔ c'ic'-i **čhoʔel-khiʔ**	"my bird has died"
Past	-taʔ	ah leʔa mey-ocow **el-taʔ**	"I dug many swamp-roots"
Inchoative	-iš and -eš	ah **yomtoʔ-iš-khiʔ**	"I've become a doctor"
Future	-ya:miʔ (more certain) and -siʔ (less certain)	miʔ may' **ohk'eč'e-siʔ**	"[be careful-] you'll cut yourself"

Negatives are marked by the suffix lahkhiʔ.

paʔ -ta -lahkhiʔ
eat -PST -NEG
"did not eat"

ah te oyaʔ keʔ - tis - ta - lahkhiʔ
1SG:NOM 3SG pot break - CAUS - PST - NEG
"I didn’t make him/her break the pot"

Prefixes are also added to verb phrases. There are speaker-oriented directional prefixes which are grouped into two classes, depending on whether the motion of the verb is directed at or away from the speaker. In narrative contexts, the direction may refer to a character. For example, two directional prefixes are ma- "away from speaker" and te- "toward speaker". Non-speaker-oriented directional prefixes include ho-, meaning "around" and pi-, meaning "accidentally". Wappo also includes pre-verbal desiderative and optative mood particles. The desiderative particle, k'ah, is used to indicate that the speaker wishes something were true. The optative particle, keye, is translated as "could", "can", or "should".

== Syntax ==
=== Word order ===
Wappo has a predicate-final word order.

cephi onoʔšiʔ okel haṭel - khiʔ
3SG:NOM Indian language learn - STAT
"s/he's learning Indian language"

Patient-initial structures are acceptable, albeit less common.

ce ew ce k'ew - i t'um - taʔ
DEM fish DEM man - NOM buy - PST
"that fish, the man bought (it)"

Wappo allows for more freedom in word order in complement clauses, especially when they have first person subjects. All three sentences below are acceptable translations of "I know that the man caught a fish".

ah ce k'ew ew ṭ'oh - taʔ haṭis - khiʔ
1SG:NOM DEM man fish catch - PST know - STAT

ah haṭis - khiʔ ce k'ew ew ṭ'oh - taʔ
1SG:NOM know - STAT DEM man fish catch - PST

ce k'ew ew ṭ'oh - taʔ ah haṭis - khiʔ
DEM man fish catch - PST 1SG:NOM know - STAT

In noun phrases, demonstrative and genitive modifiers precede the noun, while numerals and adjectives follow the noun.

he tonči
DEM cat
"this cat"

te - meʔ č'ešma
3SG - GEN bed
"his/her bed"

hinta hopoka ah k'ešu mehlahi - khiʔ
day three 1SG:NOM deer hunt - STAT
"for three days, I was hunting"

In verb phrases, oblique arguments and adverbs come before the verb.

ah kaphe kawaču - k'a hak' - šeʔ
1SG:NOM coffee sugar - COM want - DUR
"I want coffee with sugar in it"

=== Case system ===
Wappo has a rich case system which uses suffixes to mark cases. In the examples below, the words relevant to the case being discussed are in boldface.

The accusative case is unmarked. Patients, arguments of transitive verbs that are patient-like, all subjects in dependent clauses and single arguments in copulas take the accusative case.

ce k'ew ceʔeʔ i ek'a
DEM man COP 1SG son
"that man is my son"

The nominative case is marked with the suffix -i. Words functioning as initiators, agents, experiencers of transitive verbs and the single argument of an intransitive verb take the nominative case. If the noun stem to which this suffix is added happens to ends with a vowel, the stem-final vowel is dropped or changed. Otherwise, adding the nominative suffix does not change the stem. The examples below illustrate the contrast.

- pol'eʔ "boy" → pol'eʔi "boys"
- k'ešu "deer (singular)" → k'eši "deer (plural)"

The dative case, which is used to indicate the recipient or direction, is marked with -thu.

chic -i i -thu te- laha -khiʔ
bear -NOM 1SG -DAT DIR- come -STAT
"the bear is coming toward me"

The benefactive case is marked with -ma. It is used to mark whom the action benefits.

may- ma miʔ ce takaʔ mes-taʔ
who- BEN 2SG:NOM DEM basket make-PST
"who did you make that basket for?"

The instrumental case, used with intensive reflexives and instruments, is marked with -thiʔ.

cephi kuči:ya - thiʔ chica ṭ'oh - taʔ
3SG:NOM knife - INST bear kill - PST
"s/he killed the bear with a knife"

The comitative case is marked with -k'a and is used to indicate accompaniment.

ah mi -k'a čo: -siʔ
1SG:NOM 2SG -COM go -FUT
"I’ll go with you"

The genitive case is marked with -meʔ. It can only be used in constructions with alienable possession. (Inalienable possession is expressed through the juxtaposition of the two relevant nouns.)

i - meʔ luč - i lakhiʔ
1SG - GEN tobacco - NOM missing
"I don’t have any cigarettes"

Wappo also has a locative case, which is marked with suffixes such as -pi "away from" and -cawoh "on top of".

thal -i čhuya -cawoh te- cewte -khiʔ
what -NOM house -on:top DIR- fall -STAT
"what fell on the roof?"

== Questions ==
=== Yes–no questions ===
To mark yes–no questions, a question particle, /hVʔ/, is added after the verb. It does not have to directly follow the verb. The particle's vowel harmonizes with the vowel that precedes it. In all of the examples below, the question word is glossed as "Q" and is also in boldface.

uh miʔ c'ey - taʔ haʔ
already 2SG:NOM finish - PST Q
"have you finished already?

miʔ i hak' -šeʔ heʔ
2SG:NOM 1SG like -DUR Q
"do you like me?"

te ceʔ mi ek'a haʔ
3SG COP 2SG son Q
"is he your son?"

The particle is usually at the end of the sentence, but as the example below demonstrates, it is not always sentence-final. Its location depends on the composition of the verb phrase.

luče neʔ - khiʔ hiʔ miʔ
tobacco have - STAT Q 2SG:NOM
"do you have any cigarettes?"

=== Question-word questions ===
Question words are usually located clause-initially.

iṭa miʔ i yok' -okh hak' -šeʔ
where 2SG:NOM 1SG sit -INF want -DUR
"where do you want me to sit?"

Question words can also get case inflection, except in cases of inalienable possession, where no suffix is added.

may -i oyok' -eʔ
who -NOM win -DUR
"who’s winning?"

thal -i čhuya -cawote- cewte -khiʔ
what -NOM house -on:top-DIR- fall -STAT
"what fell on the roof?"

Question words can also be used as indefinite pronouns.

cephi thal t'um'i - khiʔ
3SG:NOM what go:buy - STAT
"s/he went to buy something"

may -i i naw- ta -lahkhiʔ
who -NOM 1SG see -PST- NEG
"nobody saw me"

== Language contact and influence ==
Language contact with Spanish has influenced Wappo's sound structure and vocabulary. As listed above in the consonant section, /f/, /d/, /g/, /r/ and /rʼ/ are used for Spanish borrowings. Many of the first words borrowed from Spanish into Wappo referred to items that were traded. In some cases, words may have been borrowed from other American Indian languages in contact with Spanish, rather than directly from Spanish. Below are two examples of borrowings from Spanish.

- čičaloʔ "pea" was borrowed from chícharo
- háros "rice" was borrowed from arroz

While contact with English has not greatly influenced Wappo's lexicon, it has influenced its syntax. Thompson et al. cite the sentences below as examples of an expanded use of the benefactive case that could have arisen from contact with English.

kaphe - ma ah mey k'o - taʔ
coffee - BENEF 1SG:NOM water boil - PST
"I boiled water for coffee"

[he takaʔ -i] i -ma eniya c'iti -khi? [čoč -ukh]
DEM basket -NOM 1SG -BENEF very hard -STAT weave -INF
"this basket was very hard for me to make"

While Wappo has a predicate-final structure, question words are clause-initial in most cases. This is unexpected, and possibly resulting from English influence.

may miʔ naw -taʔ
who 2SG:NOM see -PST
"who did you see?"

In another potential example of English influence, the word neʔ-khiʔ "have" is used in deontic expressions, and its meaning is adapted as "have to".

ah čoh -ukh neʔ -khiʔ maʔa heʔ
1SG:NOM go -INF have -STAT just now
"I have to go right now"

== Regional variation ==
Wappo had five varieties:

- Clear Lake Wappo
- Russian River Wappo (a.k.a. Western Wappo)
- Northern Wappo
- Central Wappo
- Southern Wappo

== See also ==
- Wappo
- Yuki–Wappo languages

== Bibliography ==
- Campbell, Lyle (1997). American Indian Languages The Historical Linguistics of Native America. New York : Oxford University Press. ISBN 978-0-19-509427-5.
- Sturtevant, William C.; Goddard, Ives (1996). Handbook of North American Indians Languages. Government Printing Office. ISBN 978-0-16-048774-3.
- Mithun, Marianne (1999). The Languages of Native North America. New York : Cambridge University Press. ISBN 978-0-521-23228-9.
- Powers, Stephen; Powell, John Wesley (1877). Tribes of California. U.S. Government Printing Office.
- Radin, Paul. 1929. A grammar of the Wappo language. University of California Publications in American Archaeology and Ethnology 27:1-194.
- Sawyer, Jesse O., English-Wappo Vocabulary (Aug 25, 1965). UC Publications in Linguistics. Paper vol. 43.
- Sawyer, Jesse O., "Wappo studies" (1984). Survey Reports. Report #7.
- Sturtevant, William C. (Ed.). (1978–present). Handbook of North American Indians (Vol. 1-20). Washington, D. C.: Smithsonian Institution. (Vols. 1–3, 16, 18-20 not yet published).
- Thompson, Sandra A.; Park, Joseph Sung-Yul; Li, Charles N. (2006). A Reference Grammar of Wappo. University of California Press. ISBN 978-0-520-09854-1.
