= Wappo =

Native American tribe in California

Wappo people
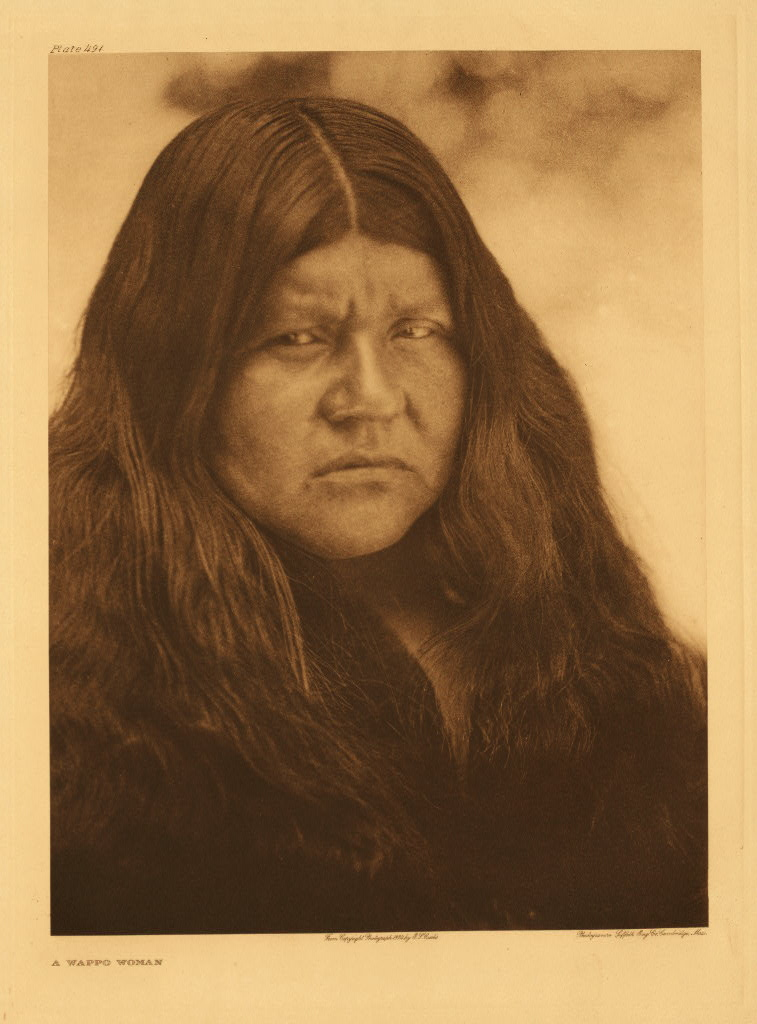
- A Wappo Woman from Edward S. Curtis Collection.

Total population
- 1770: 1,000–1,650; 1850: 188–200; 1910: 73; 1977: 50; 2000: 250; 2010: 291

Regions with significant populations
- California (Clear Lake, Napa Valley, Alexander Valley, Russian River Valley)

Languages
- English, historically Wappo

Religion
- traditional tribal religion

Related ethnic groups
- Yuki people

The Wappo (endonym: Micewal) are an Indigenous people of northern California. Their traditional homelands are in Napa Valley, the south shore of Clear Lake, Alexander Valley, and Russian River valley. They are distantly related to the Yuki people, from which they seem to have diverged at least 500 years ago. Their language, Wappo, has been influenced by the neighboring Pomo, who use the term A'shochamai or A'shotenchawi (transcribed as Ashochimi by some authors), meaning "northerners", to refer to the Wappo.

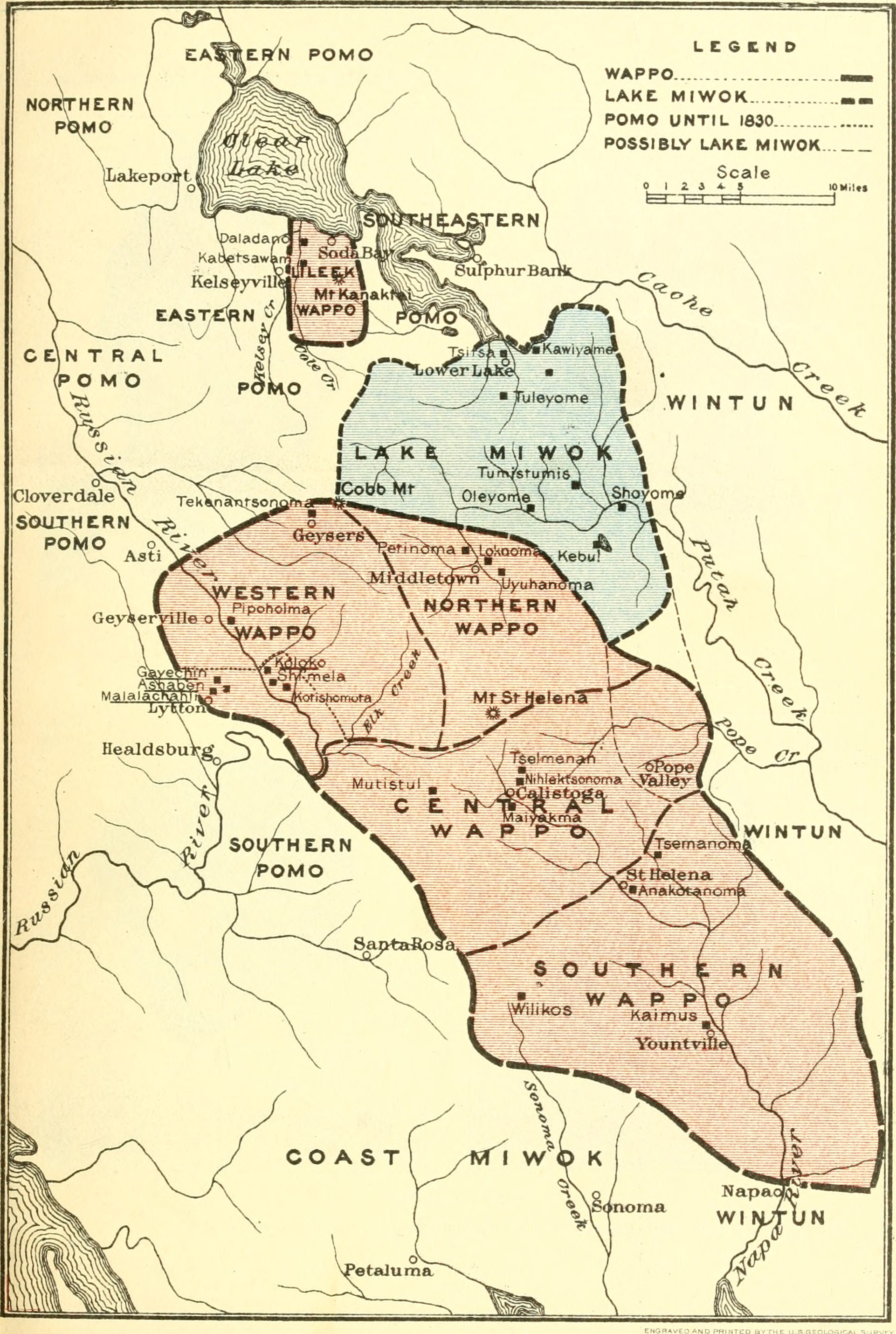
Map of Wappo territory by A.L. Kroeber, 1925.

== Culture ==
Prior to European colonization, the Wappo lived by hunting and gathering, and lived in small groups without centralized political authority, in homes built from branches, leaves and mud. Their woven baskets were so well-crafted that they were able to hold water.

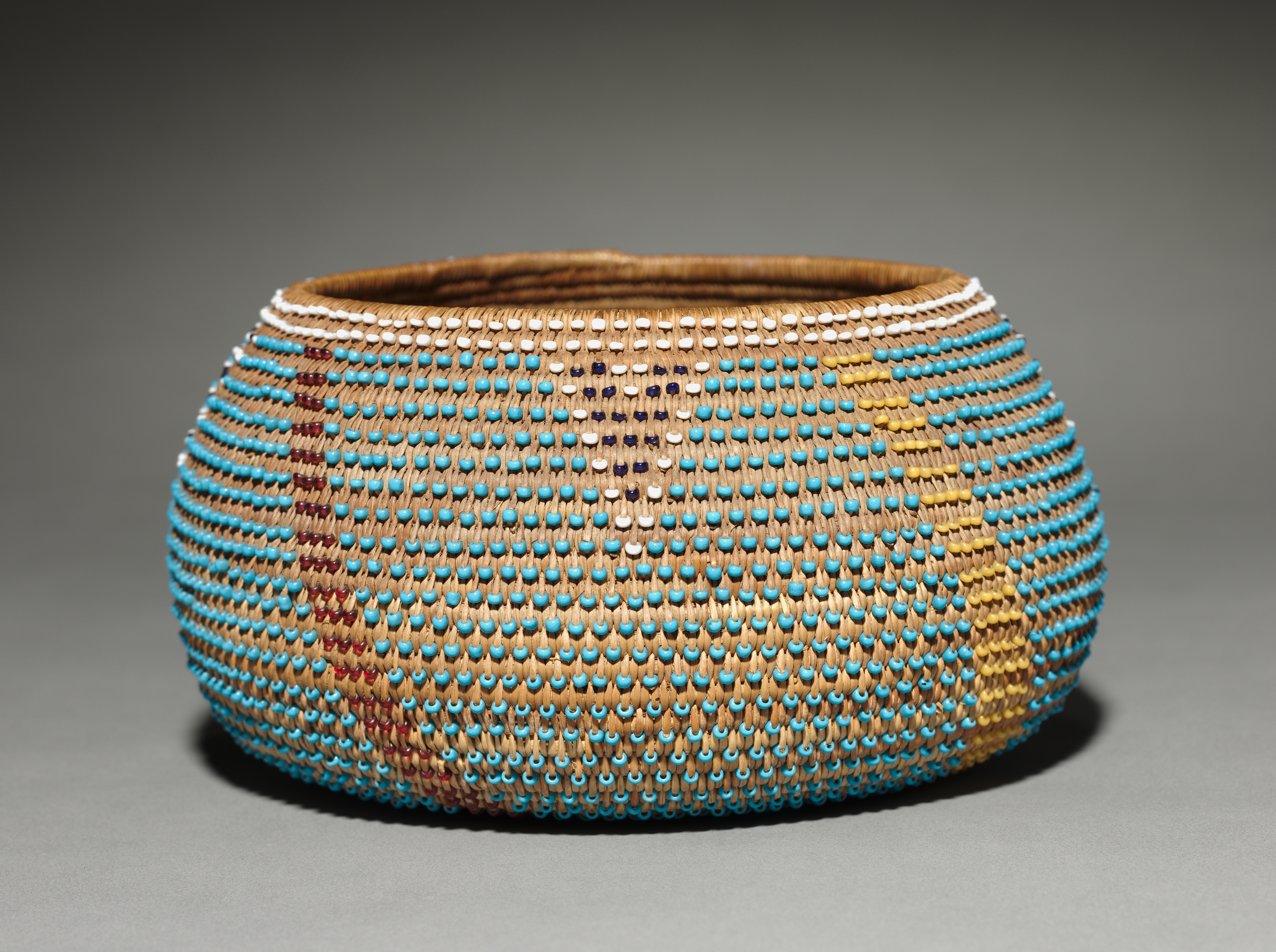
Late 19th-early 20th century Wappo basket in the Cleveland Museum of Art

== History ==
When Mexicans arrived to colonize California, Wappo villages existed near the present-day towns of Yountville, St. Helena and Calistoga. Those on the south shore of Clear Lake were completely absorbed and dispersed to the Spanish missions in California. The mission accounted for at least 550 Wappo baptisms.

The name Wappo is an Americanization of the Spanish term guapo, which means, among other things, "brave." They were known as brave for their stubborn resistance to Mexican domination, particularly their resistance to all military attempts from General Vallejo and his enlisted allies. In 1836 the warring parties signed a peace treaty.

== Population ==
Alfred L. Kroeber put the 1770 population of the Wappo at 1,000. Sherburne F. Cook (1976:174) raised this estimate to 1,650.

By the early 1850s, the surviving Wappo were reported to number between 188 and 800. However population dropped by 1880 to 50, and the 1910 Census returned only 73.

== Language ==
The Wappo language is an extinct member of the Yukian language family. A Wappo grammar has been written.

== See also ==
- Wappo language
- Wappo traditional narratives
- Fully feathered basket
